= Listed buildings in Barrow-in-Furness =

There are 274 listed buildings in the former Borough of Barrow-in-Furness (now part of Westmorland and Furness), with about 70% in Barrow-in-Furness itself. The 2015 Heritage Index formed by the Royal Society of Arts and the Heritage Lottery Fund placed the Borough as seventh highest of 325 English districts with an especially high score relating to industrial heritage assets. The Barrow Island conservation area contains dozens of historic shipyard buildings and tenements, while numerous listed buildings can be found lining Abbey Road and Duke Street, which were designed as the principal north to south and east to west thoroughfares of the Victorian planned town. Despite many buildings and structures dating from this era, an abundance of listed buildings exist throughout the Borough that pre-date Barrow, in villages that were consumed by the rapidly expanding town. One notable example being Newbarns village which retains its original 18th century street layout. Significant clusters of listed buildings can be found around the ruins of the 12th-century Furness Abbey and Market Street, the Medieval centre of Dalton-in-Furness. The oldest listed building in Barrow is Furness Abbey, dated 1127 and the newest is the John Whinnerah Institute, completed in 1934.

Within other heritage categories, assets recognised by Historic England in Barrow including Barrow Cemetery and Barrow Park which are both designated Grade II on the Register of Historic Parks and Gardens. Furness Abbey in addition to comprising listed buildings is also a Scheduled Monument.

== Grade I Listed buildings ==
Barrow-in-Furness has 8 Grade I listed buildings, representing a higher proportion of all listed buildings than national average. They are listed below.

Name	Image	Location	Year Completed	Year Listed	Historic England Description
Dalton Castle		Dalton South	c. 14th century	1950	DALTON CASTLE
Furness Abbey		Newbarns	1127	1949	FURNESS ABBEY, INCLUDING ALL MEDIEVAL REMAINS IN CARE OF ENGLISH HERITAGE
Furness Abbey Chapel		Newbarns	c. 1300	1976	CAPELLA EXTRA PORTAS WITH ATTACHED WALLS
Furness Abbey Main Gateway		Newbarns	c. 14th century	1976	GATEWAY ADJOINING CAPELLA EXTRA
Furness Abbey Precinct Wall		Newbarns	1127	1949	FURNESS ABBEY WALL
Furness Abbey West Gateway		Newbarns	c. 14th century	1976	ST GATE TO FURNESS ABBEY, REMAINS OF
Piel Castle		Roose (Piel Island)	1327	1949	PIEL CASTLE
Rampside Hall		Roose (Rampside)	c. 17th century	1949	RAMPSIDE HALL 101

== Grade II* Listed buildings ==
Barrow-in-Furness has 15 Grade II* listed buildings. They are listed below.

Name	Image	Location	Year completed	Year listed	Historic England description
1-13 Sloop Street		Barrow Island	1884	1993	SLOOP STREET TENEMENTS
1-13 Steamer Street		Barrow Island	1884	1993	STEAMER STREET TENEMENTS
Abbey House Hotel		Newbarns	1914	1949	ABBEY HOUSE HOTEL
Barrow-in-Furness Town Hall		Central Barrow	1887	1976	TOWN HALL
Devonshire Buildings		Barrow Island	1875	1976	DEVONSHIRE BUILDINGS 10-14
Devonshire Pub		Barrow Island	1874	1976	THE DEVONSHIRE PUBLIC HOUSE
Marsh Grange Farmhouse		Dalton North (Askam and Ireleth)	c. 17th century	1950	MARSH GRANGE MARSH GRANGE FARMHOUSE
Marsh Grange Walls		Dalton North (Askam and Ireleth)	c. 17th century	1950	GATE PIERS AND WALL ENCLOSING FORECOURT AT MARSH GRANGE
Ormsgill Farmhouse		Ormsgill	1605	1949	ORMSGILL FARMHOUSE
Park House Farmhouse		Newbarns	c. 16th century	1949	PARK HOUSE FARMHOUSE
Sowerby Hall Farm, Barn		Ormsgill	c. 16th century	1993	BARN IMMEDIATELY TO REAR OF SOWERBY HALL FARMHOUSE
St. Mary's Church		Dalton South	1885	1950	CHURCH OF ST MARY
St. James' Church		Hindpool	1869	1976	CHURCH OF ST JAMES
Tytup Hall		Dalton North	c. 1710	1950	TYTUP HALL
Walney Lighthouse		South Walney	1790	1976	WALNEY LIGHTHOUSE WITH TWO ATTACHED COTTAGES AND OUTBUILDINGS

== Grade II Listed buildings ==
Barrow-in-Furness has 250 Grade II listed buildings. They are listed below.

Name	Image	Location	Year Completed	Year Listed	Historic England Description
1 Chase End, Cross Lane		Hawcoat	c. 18th century	1976	CHASE END 1
1 Dorcas Avenue		Newbarns	c. 19th century	1976	1
1 Newbarns Village		Newbarns	c. 18th century	1976	1
1 North Scale		North Walney (North Scale)	1684	1976	1
1 Roosecote-Dungeon Lane, Barn		Roose	c. 17th century	1993	BARN IMMEDIATELY TO SOUTH WEST OF NUMBER 1 ROOSECOTE
1 Roosecote-Dungeon Lane, Farmhouse		Roose	c. 17th century	1949	ROOSECOTE 1
1 Skelgate		Dalton South	c. 18th century	1976	1, SKELGATE
1 St. George's Square		Central Barrow	1864	1976	1
1 and 2 Market Place		Dalton South	c. 19th century	1976	1 AND 2, MARKET PLACE
1-5 Castle Street		Dalton South	c. 18th century	1976	NUMBER 2 PART
1-41 Parade Street		Central Barrow	1896	1976	1-41
1-8 Piel Island		Roose (Piel Island)	1875	1976	1-8 PIEL ISLAND
1-9 Barque Street		Barrow Island	1884	1993	BARQUE STREET TENEMENTS 1-9
1-9 Brig Street		Barrow Island	1884	1993	BRIG STREET TENEMENTS 1-9
1-9 Schooner Street		Barrow Island	1884	1993	SCHOONER STREET TENEMENTS 1-9
1-9 Ship Street		Barrow Island	1884	1993	SHIP STREET TENEMENT 1-9
10 Biggar Village		South Walney (Biggar)	c. 19th century	1976	RAINBOW COTTAGE 10
10 Hector Street		Newbarns	c. 18th century	1976	HECTOR HOUSE 10
101, 103, 105, 107 and 109 Duke Street		Central Barrow	1865	1975	101-109
11 Market Street		Dalton South	1870	1993	11, MARKET STREET
111, 113, 115, 117 and 119 Duke Street		Central Barrow	1870	1976	111-119
113-119 Rawlison Street, Former Police Station		Central Barrow	1880	1976	113-119
12 Biggar Village		South Walney (Biggar)	c. 17th century	1976	HILL FARMHOUSE 12
12 Cross Lane		Hawcoat	c. 18th century	1975	12
121 and 122 Duke Street		Central Barrow	1873	1976	THE LORD RAMSDEN PUBLIC HOUSE 121 AND 122
125 Duke Street		Central Barrow	1873	1976	125
127, 129 and 131 Duke Street		Central Barrow	1873	1976	127, 129 AND 131
13, 14 and 15 Market Street		Dalton South	c. 19th century	1976	ATTACHED OUTBUILDINGS TO NUMBER 15 BALDWIN HOUSE
14 North Scale		North Walney (North Scale)	1751	1976	14
14 North Scale, Farm Buildings		North Walney (North Scale)	c. 18th century	1993	FARM BUILDINGS IMMEDIATELY TO SOUTH EAST OF NUMBER 14
14 Tower Street		Roose (Roa Island)	c. 19th century	1976	TOWER HOUSE 14
14-20 Salthouse Road		Central Barrow	1849	1976	14-20
143 Salthouse Road		Central Barrow	c. 19th century	1976	143
143 Salthouse Road, Barn		Central Barrow	c. 18th century	1976	BARN IMMEDIATELY TO WEST OF NUMBER 143
145 and 147 Salthouse Road		Central Barrow	c. 17th century	1976	145 AND 147
148, 150 and 152, Market Street		Dalton South	c. 18th century	1976	148, 150 AND 152, MARKET STREET
151 Salthouse Road		Central Barrow	1802	1976	151
153 Salthouse Road and Farm Buildings		Central Barrow	c. 18th century	1976	NUMBER 153 WITH ADJOINING FARM BUILDINGS
16 Market Street		Dalton South	c. 18th century	1976	16, MARKET PLACE
16 and 16A, Tudor Square		Dalton South	c. 18th century	1976	16 AND 16A, TUDOR SQUARE
16, 18 and 20, Market Street		Dalton South	c. 18th century	1976	16, 18 AND 20, MARKET STREET
17 Market Street		Dalton South	c. 18th century	1976	17, MARKET STREET
17 Roanhead Lane		Hawcoat	c. 18th century	1976	NUMBER 17 AND ATTACHED OUTBUILDING
18 Market Street		Dalton South	c. 18th century	1976	16, MARKET PLACE
18, 19 and 20, Tudor Square		Dalton South	c. 18th century	1976	18, 19 AND 20, TUDOR SQUARE
19 Biggar Village		South Walney (Biggar)	c. 18th century	1976	19
19 Biggar Village, Barn		South Walney (Biggar)	c. 18th century	1976	BARN TO SOUITH EAST OF NUMBER 19
19 Market Street		Dalton South	c. 19th century	1976	NUMBER 19 WITH ATTACHED BARN AND FRONT GARDEN WALL
19A and 19B Market Street		Dalton South	c. 19th century	1976	19, 19A AND 19B, MARKET PLACE
19 Newbarns Village		Newbarns	1770	1976	19
19 North Scale		North Walney (North Scale)	1762	1976	19
2 Biggar Village, Farm Buildings		South Walney (Biggar)	c. 17th century	1976	RANGE OF FARM BUILDINGS ATTACHED TO NUMBER 2
2 Roosecote-Dungeon Lane		Roose	c. 17th century	1949	ROOSECOTE 2
2 Skelgate		Dalton South	c. 18th century	1976	2, SKELGATE
2, 2A and 4, Market Street		Dalton South	c. 18th century	1976	2, 2A, AND 4, MARKET STREET
2-10 Salthouse Road		Central Barrow	1846	1976	2-10
2-46 Keith Street		Central Barrow	1895	1976	2-46
20 North Scale and Farm Buildings		North Walney (North Scale)	1728	1975	NUMBER 20 WITH ATTACHED FRONT GARDEN WALL AND ATTACHED BARN AND SHIPPONS
22, 24 and 26, Market Street		Dalton South	c. 18th century	1976	22, 24 AND 26, MARKET STREET
2, 3 and 4, King's Mount		Dalton South	c. 19th century	1976	NUMBERS 2,3 AND 4 AND ATTACHED STABLE
24-28 The Green		Dalton North (Lindal-in-Furness)	c. 19th century	1976	24-28, THE GREEN
28 North Scale and Farm Buildings		North Walney (North Scale)	1725	1976	NUMBER 28 WITH ATTACHED STABLES
2-8, Ulverston Road		Dalton South	c. 19th century	1976	2-8, ULVERSTON ROAD
298 Abbey Road		Newbarns	1878	1976	298 ABBEY ROAD
3 Market Street		Dalton South	c. 17th century	1976	3, MARKET STREET
3 Roosecote-Dungeon Lane		Roose	c. 17th century	1949	ROOSECOTE 3
3-51 Keith Street		Central Barrow	1865	1976	3-51
30-34 The Green		Dalton North (Lindal-in-Furness)	c. 19th century	1976	30-34, THE GREEN
32 Robert Street		Hindpool	1870	1976	32
33 Market Street		Dalton South	c. 19th century	1976	33, MARKET STREET
36 Dalton Road		Hindpool	c. 1880s	1976	36
4 Duke Street, Duke Street Surgery		Central Barrow	c.20th century	1976	4
4 Market Place		Dalton South	c. 19th century	1976	4, MARKET PLACE
4 Newbarns Village		Newbarns	c. 19th century	1976	NUMBER 4 NEW BARNS VILLAGE
44 Market Street		Dalton South	c. 18th century	1976	44, MARKET STREET
46 Market Street		Dalton South	c. 19th century	1976	46, MARKET STREET
47, 49 and 51, Market Street		Dalton South	c. 19th century	1976	47, 49 AND 51, MARKET STREET
6 Biggar Village		South Walney (Biggar)	c. 18th century	1976	MANOR FARMHOUSE 6
6 Market Place		Dalton South	c. 18th century	1976	NUMBER 6 WITH ATTACHED FRONT GARDEN WALL
6-26 School Street		Central Barrow	c. 19th century	1976	6-26
63, 65 and 67 Duke Street		Central Barrow	1865	1976	63, 65 AND 67
7 and 8 The Green		Dalton North (Lindal-in-Furness)	c. 19th century	1976	7 AND 8, THE GREEN
77 and 79 Duke Street		Central Barrow	1865	1976	77 AND 79
8 Biggar Village		South Walney (Biggar)	c. 18th century	1976	SQUIRE'S COTTAGE 8
81, 83, 85, 87 and 89 Duke Street		Central Barrow	1865	1976	81-89
9-12 The Green		Dalton North (Lindal-in-Furness)	c. 19th century	1976	9-12, THE GREEN
92, 94 and 96 Duke Street		Hindpool	1875	1993	BARCLAYS BANK 92, 94 AND 96
96 Market Street		Dalton South	c. 19th century	1993	NUMBER 96 AND FRONT GARDEN WALL
Abbey Approach Gateway		Newbarns	1873	1976	GATEWAY TO ABBEY APPROACH
Abbey Gate Cottages		Newbarns	1873	1976	ABBEY GATE COTTAGES
Abbey Road Conservative Club		Hindpool	1899	1976	CONSERVATIVE CLUB
Abbey Road Working Men's Club		Hindpool	1871	1976	WORKING MEN'S CLUB AND INSTITUTE
Abbot's Wood House		Roose	1877	1974	HOME FARMHOUSE AND ATTACHED FARM BUILDINGS
Abbot's Wood Perimeter Wall		Roose	1877	1974	KITCHEN GARDEN PERIMETER WALL AT HOME FARM
Abbot's Wood South Lodge		Roose	1873	1973	SOUTH LODGE AT ABBOTSWOOD (NOT INCLUDED)
Alfred Barrow School, Central Block		Central Barrow	1888	1993	ALFRED BARROW SCHOOL, CENTRE BLOCK
Anvil House		Dalton North (Askam and Ireleth)	c. 19th century	1976	ANVIL HOUSE
Ashburner House		Dalton North	1895	1993	ASHBURNER HOUSE AT DOWDALES SCHOOL
Askam railway station east waiting room		Dalton North (Askam and Ireleth)	c.20th century	1989	WAITING ROOM ON EAST SIDE OF LINE AT ASKAM IN FURNESS RAILWAY STATION
Askam railway station signal box and walls		Dalton North (Askam and Ireleth)	c. 19th century	1989	SIGNAL BOX AND ATTACHED WALLING AT ASKAM IN FURNESS RAILWAY STATION
Askam railway station ticket office and waiting room		Dalton North (Askam and Ireleth)	1877	1989	TICKET OFFICE AND WAITING ROOM AT ASKAM IN FURNESS RAILWAY STATION
Bank and Church House		Dalton South	c. 18th century	1976	BANK HOUSE CHURCH HOUSE
Barrow Main Public Library		Hindpool	1874	1922	PUBLIC LIBRARY, MUSEUM AND FORECOURT WALL AND RAILINGS FACING RAMSDEN SQUARE
Beckside Conservative Club		Dalton South	c. 19th century	1950	BECKSIDE CONSERVATIVE CLUB
Bow Bridge		Newbarns	1500s	1993	BRIDGE OVER MILL BECK AND ATTACHED GATEWAY AT ABBEY DALE
Bow Windows Farm		Roose (Rampside)	1654	1976	BOW WINDOWS FARMHOUSE AND ATTACHED FARMBUILDINGS
Brook Lea		Dalton North (Askam and Ireleth)	c. 19th century	1976	BROOK LEA
Brookside		Dalton North (Askam and Ireleth)	c. 18th century	1976	BROOKSIDE
Burlington House		Central Barrow	1890	1976	BURLINGTON HOUSE
Cenotaph		Parkside	1919	1976	WAR MEMORIAL IN PUBLIC PARK
Castle View		Dalton South	c. 19th century	1976	CASTLE VIEW
Central Fire Station		Central Barrow	1911	1991	CENTRAL FIRE STATION
Chappells Tavern		Dalton North	1892	1976	CHAPPELLS TAVERN
Chetwynde School, Main Building		Newbarns	1865	1976	OUR LADY'S SCHOOL, CROSSLANDS CONVENT
Cooke's Buildings		Hindpool	1875	1976	COOKE'S BUILDINGS
Cornerstone House		Dalton North	1870	1976	CORNERSTONE HOUSE
Crofters Cow House and Barn		Roose	c. 18th century	1978	COW HOUSE AND BARN WITH ATTACHED HORSE ENGINE HOUSE NORTH EAST OF CROFTERS PUBLIC HOUSE
Crofters Cow House and Shelter Shed		Roose	c. 19th century	1978	FORMER COW HOUSE AND ATTACHED SHELTER SHED IMMEDIATELY NORTH OF CROFTERS PUBLIC HOUSE
Crofters Garden Wall		Roose	c. 19th century	1978	WALL ENCLOSING GARDEN TO FRONT AND SOUTH SIDE OF CROFTERS PUBLIC HOUSE
Crofters Pigsties and Wall		Roose	c. 19th century	1978	GROUP OF 3 FORMER PIGSTIES AND MIDDEN WALL AT CROFTERS PUBLIC HOUSE
Crofters Public House		Roose	1828	1978	CROFTERS PUBLIC HOUSE
Crosslands Lodge		Newbarns	1875	1976	LODGE TO CROSSLANDS
Custom House		Central Barrow	1870	1976	ST MARY'S CLUB
Dalton Cemetery North Chapel		Dalton South	1862	1993	DALTON CEMETERY, NORTHERNMOST CHAPEL
Dalton House		Dalton South	1840	1976	DALTON HOUSE
Former Dalton Public Library		Dalton North	1903	1993	FORMER DALTON PUBLIC LIBRARY
Dalton War Memorial		Dalton South	1922	1993	WAR MEMORIAL
Dane Gill Beck Bridge		Newbarns	1887	1993	JUBILEE BRIDGE
Drigg Farmhouse and Barn		Dalton North (Lindal-in-Furness)	1635	1950	DRIGG AND IRTON CHURCH FARMHOUSE AND ATTACHED BARN
Drinking fountain at Breast Mill Beck/ Abbey Road		Hawcoat	1876	1976	DRINKING FOUNTAIN AT JUNCTION WITH ABBEY ROAD
Duke of Edinburgh Hotel		Hindpool	1875	1976	DUKE OF EDINBURGH HOTEL
Eastwood House		Roose (Rampside)	c. 19th century	1993	EASTWOOD HOUSE
Elliscale Farm Cow House and Barn		Dalton North	c. 18th century	1976	BARNS AND COW HOUSE TO SOUTH OF FARMYARD AT ELLISCALE FARM
Elliscale Farm Garden Wall		Dalton North	c. 18th century	1976	GARDEN WALL TO SOUTH AND WEST OF ELLISCALE FARMHOUSE INCLUDING FARM BUILDING ATTACHED TO SOUTH WEST
Elliscale Farmhouse		Dalton North	c. 17th century	1976	ELLISCALE FARMHOUSE
Empire House		Dalton South	c. 18th century	1976	EMPIRE HOUSE
Former Custodian's Cottage		Newbarns	c. 15th century	1993	FURNESS ABBEY, FORMER CUSTODIAN'S COTTAGE
Former Mine Ancillary Block		Roose (Stank)	1875	1976	FORMER MINE BUILDING IMMEDIATELY TO NORTH OF GLENFIELD HOUSE
Furness Abbey Cottage		Newbarns	1873	1983	FURNESS ABBEY COTTAGE
Gate Farmhouse and Farm Buildings		Dalton North (Marton)	c. 17th century	1976	GATE FARMHOUSE AND ATTACHED FARM BUILDINGS
Glenfield House, Former Mining Offices		Roose (Stank)	1875	1976	GLENFIELD HOUSE
Gravestone to George Romney		Dalton South	1802	1976	GRAVESTONE TO GEORGE ROMNEY APPROXIMATELY 12 METRES SOUTH OF CHURCH OF ST MARY
Graving Dock within the Dock Museum		Hindpool	1872	1993	GRAVING DOCK
Harbour Hotel		Central Barrow	1850	1976	HARBOUR HOTEL
High Farmhouse		Dalton North (Lindal-in-Furness)	1879	1976	HIGH FARMHOUSE
Hill Rise		Dalton South	c. 18th century	1977	HILL RISE
Hotel Imperial		Central Barrow	1875	1976	HOTEL IMPERIAL
Hotel Imperial, External Lanterns		Central Barrow	c. 19th century	1976	PAIR OF LAMP STANDARDS OUTSIDE ENTRANCE TO HOTEL IMPERIAL
John Whinnerah Institute		Hindpool	1938	2001	THE JOHN WHINNERAH INSTITUTE BUILDING WITH GATE PIERS TO FRONT AND BICYCLE SHED IN REAR WALL
Lime Kiln		Dalton North	c. 18th century	1993	LIME KILN AT NGR 2321 7468
Lindal Moor Farmhouse and Farm Buildings		Dalton North (Lindal-in-Furness)	c. 17th century	1976	LINDAL MOOR FARMHOUSE AND ATTACHED FARM BUILDINGS
Lindal Village Hall		Dalton North (Lindal-in-Furness)	1875	1976	BUCCLEUCH HALL
Dalton Town Hall (Local Board Offices)		Dalton South	1884	1976	FORMER LOCAL BOARD OFFICES
Local Board Offices Outbuildings		Dalton South	1884	1993	OUTBUILDINGS TO REAR OF FORMER LOCAL BOARD OFFICES
Low Brookside		Dalton North (Askam and Ireleth)	1688	1976	LOW BROOKSIDE
Low Farmhouse		Dalton North (Lindal-in-Furness)	1883	1976	LOW FARMHOUSE
Hotel Majestic		Central Barrow	1904	1976	HOTEL MAJESTIC
Manor Farmhouse		Newbarns	1845	1976	MANOR FARMHOUSE
Market Cross and Benches		Dalton South	1870	1976	MARKET CROSS AND STONE BENCHES
Market Place Drinking Fountain		Dalton South	1897	1976	DRINKING FOUNTAIN
Marton Hall and Farm Buildings		Dalton North (Marton)	c. 18th century	1976	MARTON HALL AND ATTACHED FARM BUILDINGS
Millwood House		Hawcoat	1860	1992	MILLWOOD
Moorhead Farm		Roose (Rampside)	1719	1976	NUMBER 1 MOORHEAD COTTAGES AND ATTACHED BARN
Nan Tait Centre		Hindpool	1903	1976	COLLEGE OF FURTHER EDUCATION ANNEXE INCLUDING FRONT RAILINGS AND PIERS
National Westminster Bank		Hindpool	1874	1976	NATIONAL WESTMINSTER BANK
Natwest Bank and Chambers		Dalton South	1895	1993	NATWEST BANK AND BANK CHAMBERS
New Inn		South Walney (Biggar)	1758	1976	NEW INN AND ATTACHED BUILDINGS
North Lodge, Abbey House		Newbarns	1914	1976	NORTH LODGE TO ABBEY HOUSE
Oakdene		Dalton South	1683	1976	OAKDENE
Old School House, Walney Promenade		South Walney (Vickerstown)	1856	1973	OLD SCHOOL HOUSE
Ormsgill Farm Buildings		Ormsgill	c. 18th century	1949	BARN AND OUTBUILDING ADJOINING ORMSGILL FARMHOUSE
Oxford Chambers		Hindpool	1875	1976	OXFORD CHAMBERS
Pinfold		Dalton South	c. 18th century	1993	PINFOLD
Porter's Lodge		Newbarns	1873	1976	ABBEY DALE
Public Library Telephone Booths		Hindpool	1935	1987	PAIR OF K6 TELEPHONE KIOSKS ADJACENT TO PUBLIC LIBRARY
Queen's Arms Hotel		South Walney (Biggar)	c. 17th century	1976	QUEEN'S ARMS HOTEL
Queen's Arms Hotel, Adjacent Barn		South Walney (Biggar)	c. 18th century	1976	BARN FACING SOUTH SIDE OF QUEEN'S ARMS HOTEL
Railwaymen's Club		Central Barrow	1865	1976	RAILWAYMEN'S CLUB AND PREMISES OF HSP PRINTING
Rampside Lighthouse		Roose (Rampside)	1875	1991	NUMBER 4 LEADING LIGHT ON FORESHORE NEAR RAMPSIDE HALL
Ramsden Hall		Hindpool	1872	1976	RAMSDEN HALL
Red Lion Hotel		Dalton South	c. 17th century	1977	RED LION HOTEL
Roa Island Hotel		Roose (Roa Island)	c. 19th century	1976	ROA ISLAND HOTEL
Roa Island Watch Tower		Roose (Roa Island)	1849	1976	WATCH TOWER
Romney Cottage		Ormsgill	c. 18th century	1976	ROMNEY COTTAGE
Rose Cottage		Dalton South	c. 18th century	1976	ROSE COTTAGE
Rose Cottage, Former Mine Lodge		Roose (Stank)	1875	1976	ROSE COTTAGE
Sandylands Farm		Newbarns	1623	1976	SANDYLANDS FARMHOUSE AND ATTACHED BARN
Seventh Day Adventist Church		Dalton South	1868	1976	SEVENTH DAY ADVENTIST CHURCH WITH ATTACHED RAILINGS
Shipyard Engineering Workshop		Barrow Island	c.20th century	1993	HEAVY ENGINEERING SHOP AT VICKERS SHIP AND ENGINEERING LIMITED
Shipyard Kings Gate Entrance and National Westminster Bank Building		Barrow Island	1913	1993	WORKS ENTRANCE LODE AND GATEWAY AT VICKERS SHIP AND ENGINEERING LIMITED KINGS GATE INCLUDING NATIONAL WESTMINSTER BANK
Shipyard Offices and Barrow Island Entrance Gateway		Barrow Island	1913	1993	FRONT RANGE ADO BUILDING, LODGE, GATEWAY AND RAILINGS AT VICKERS SHIP AND ENGINEERING LIMITED ENGINE GARTEWAY
Shipyard Office Buildings		Barrow Island	1872	1976	GENERAL OFFICES, TECHNICAL/COMMERCIAL, AT VICKERS SHIP AND ENGINEERING LIMITED
Sink Fall Farm		Hawcoat	c. 18th century	1976	SINK FALL FARMHOUSE WITH ATTACHED FARM BUILDINGS
South End Farm		South Walney (Biggar)	1764	1976	SOUTH END FARMHOUSE AND ATTACHED FARM BUILDINGS
Sowerby Hall Farmhouse		Ormsgill	1880	1976	SOWERBY HALL FARMHOUSE
Sowerby Lodge		Ormsgill	c. 17th century	1976	SOWERBY LODGE FARMHOUSE
Sowerby Lodge Barn		Ormsgill	c. 18th century	1976	BARN IMMEDIATELY TO NORTH EAST OF SOWERBY LODGE FARMHOUSE
St. John's Church Of England Church		Barrow Island	1935	1993	CHURCH OF ST JOHN
St. George's Church of England Church		Central Barrow	1861	1976	CHURCH OF ST GEORGE
St. George's Church of England Primary School		Hindpool	1849	1976	ST GEORGES CHURCH OF ENGLAND PRIMARY SCHOOL
St. George's House		Central Barrow	1860	1973	ST GEORGE'S HOUSE
St. Mary's Cottage		Dalton South	c. 19th century	1976	ST MARY'S COTTAGE
St. Mary of Furness Presbytery		Hindpool	c.20th century	1976	PRESBYTERY TO CHURCH OF ST MARY OF FURNESS WITH WALL CONNECTING TO
St. Mary of Furness Roman Catholic Church		Hindpool	1867	1976	CHURCH OF ST MARY OF FURNESS
St. Mary the Virgin Church Of England Church		South Walney (Vickerstown)	1908	1976	CHURCH OF ST MARY
St. Mary's Vicarage		Dalton South	c. 19th century	1976	THE VICARAGE, VICARAGE COTTAGE AND ATTCACHED FRONT GARDEN WALL
St. Peter's Church		Dalton North (Askam and Ireleth)	1865	1993	CHURCH OF ST PETER
St. Peter's Church		Dalton North (Lindal-in-Furness)	1886	1993	CHURCH OF ST PETER
Stank Farm		Roose (Stank)	c. 17th century	1976	STANK FARMHOUSE AND ATTACHED FARM BUILDINGS
Stank Farm Cow House		Roose (Stank)	c. 18th century	1976	BARN ON ROADSIDE TO NORTH WEST OF STANK FARMHOUSE
Stank Iron ore Mines Entrance		Roose (Stank)	1875	1976	ENTRANCE GATEWAYS TO GLENFIELD HOUSE INCLUDING ATTACHED SIDE GATE TO ROSE COTTAGE
Stank Mines Engine House		Roose (Stank)	1875	1976	ENGINE HOUSE AT NGR SD 2325 7080 TO NORTH EAST OF GLENFIELD HOUSE
Statue of Henry Schneider, Schneider Square		Central Barrow	1891	1976	STATUE OF HENRY SCHNEIDER
Statue of Lord Frederick Cavendish		Central Barrow	1885	1976	STATUE OF LORD FREDERICK CAVENDISH AT JUNCTION WITH NORTH ROAD
Statue of Sir James Ramsden, Ramsden Square		Hindpool	1872	1976	STATUE OF SIR JAMES RAMSDEN
The Abbey Tavern		Newbarns	c. 19th century	1993	THE ABBEY TAVERN
The Cavendish Arms Public House		Dalton South	1855	1976	THE CAVENDISH ARMS PUBLIC HOUSE
The Clarence Inn		Dalton South	c. 19th century	1976	THE CLARENCE INN
The Concle Public House		Roose (Rampside)	c. 19th century	1976	THE CONCLE PUBLIC HOUSE
The Ship Inn		Roose (Piel Island)	c. 18th century	1976	THE SHIP INN
The White Horse Public House		Dalton South	c. 19th century	1976	THE WHITE HORSE PUBLIC HOUSE
Thorncliffe Crematorium, Gate House		Ormsgill	1874	1993	BOROUGH CEMETERY GATE HOUSE AND ATTACHED RAILINGS
Thorncliffe Crematorium, North Lodge		Ormsgill	1874	1993	BOROUGH CEMETERY GATE HOUSE AND ATTACHED RAILINGS
Thorncliffe Crematorium, Roman Catholic Chapel		Ormsgill	1872	1993	ROMAN CATHOLIC CEMETERY CHAPEL AT BOROUGH CEMETERY
Thwaite Flat Farmhouse		Hawcoat	c. 18th century	1976	THWAITE FLAT FARMHOUSE
Victoria Hall		Hindpool	1888	1991	VICTORIA HALL
Victoria Memorial Fountain		Dalton North (Askam and Ireleth)	1897	1993	DRINKING FOUNTAIN NEAR RAILWAY CROSSING
Victoria Park Hotel		Parkside	c.20th century	1976	VICTORIA PARK HOTEL
Waver Cottage		Roose (Rampside)	c. 19th century	1976	WAVER COTTAGE 30
Wesleyan Sunday School		Dalton North	1896	1993	FORMER WESLEYAN SUNDAY SCHOOL
West Gate Cottage		Newbarns	1873	1976	WEST GATE COTTAGE
West Lodge, Abbey House		Newbarns	1914	1976	WEST LODGE TO ABBEY HOUSE WITH ATTACHED GATEHOUSE AND WING WALLS
Working Men's Club and Institute		Hindpool	1871	1976	WORKING MEN'S CLUB AND INSTITUTE

== Demolished Listed Buildings ==
The following Grade II listed buildings have been demolished in Barrow. The list excludes buildings that were de-listed and subsequently demolished (e.g. 51 Forshaw Street and Queen's Hotel).

Name	Image	Location	Year Completed	Year Listed	Year Demolished	English Heritage Description
North Lonsdale Hospital North Wing		Central Barrow	1887	1976	1995	NORTH LONSDALE HOSPITAL, REMAINING NORTH WING
North Lonsdale Hospital South Wing		Central Barrow	1899	1976	1995	NORTH LONSDALE HOSPITAL, REMAINING SOUTH WING
Trinity Church		Hindpool	1875	1976	2013	PRESBYTERIAN CHURCH
