= 2013 Cumbria County Council election =

2013 UK local government election

- 2 May 2013

All 84 seats to Cumbria County Council 43 seats needed for a majority
	First party	Second party	Third party
Party	Labour	Conservative	Liberal Democrats
Seats won	35	26	16
Seat change	▲11	▼12	Steady
- Map showing the results of the 2013 Cumbria County Council elections.
Council control before election
No Overall Control
Council control after election
No Overall Control

An election to Cumbria County Council took place on 2 May 2013 as part of the 2013 United Kingdom local elections. All 84 councillors were elected from electoral divisions which returned one county councillor each by first-past-the-post voting for a four-year term of office. Following an electoral review carried out by the Local Government Boundary Commission for England, newly drawn electoral divisions were used without change in the number of county councillors.

All locally registered electors (British, Irish, Commonwealth and European Union citizens) who were aged 18 or over on Thursday 2 May 2013 were entitled to vote in the local elections. Those who were temporarily away from their ordinary address (for example, away working, on holiday, in student accommodation or in hospital) were also entitled to vote in the local elections, although those who had moved abroad and registered as overseas electors cannot vote in the local elections. It is possible to register to vote at more than one address (such as a university student who had a term-time address and lives at home during holidays) at the discretion of the local Electoral Register Office, but it remains an offence to vote more than once in the same local government election. Prior to the election the Conservatives were in a joint administration with Labour, the Liberal Democrats being in opposition.

== Summary ==
The election saw the council remain in no overall control. However Labour councillors overtook Conservatives to become the largest party on the county council.

The Liberal Democrat and Conservative parties had enough seats to form a coalition, with the support of some of the Independents, but following the election of a new Leader of the Liberal Democrat Group, a coalition was formed between them and Labour, with the Conservatives going into opposition .

== Results ==
Party	Councillors				Votes		
Party		Of total	Net			Of total	Net
Conservative Party	26	44.0%	-12	26 / 84	39,581	31.6%	-8.5%
Labour Party	35	41.7%	+11	35 / 84	34,876	27.9%	+6.5%
Liberal Democrats	16	19.0%	0	16 / 84	23,282	18.6%	-0.4%
UK Independence Party	0	0.0%	0	0 / 84	14,591	11.7%	+10.9%
Independent	7	8.3%	+2	7 / 84	7,013	5.6%	+0.7%
Green	0	0.0%	0	0 / 84	2,798	2.2%	0%
British National Party	0	0.0%	0	0 / 84	1,737	1.4%	-3.8%
Socialist People's Party	0	0.0%	0	0 / 84	256	0.2%	-0.7%
Trade Unionist and Socialist Coalition	0	0.0%	0	0 / 84	226	0.2%	+0.2%

=== Members elected ===
The election returned members as follows:

Electoral division	Member(s) elected	Party	District (note: administered as a whole)
Aspatria	Jim Lister	Conservative	Allerdale
Bothel and Wharrels	Joseph (Alan) Bowness	Conservative	Allerdale
Cockermouth North	Eric Nicholson	Conservative	Allerdale
Cockermouth South	Allan Kennon	Conservative	Allerdale
Dearham and Broughton	Alan Clark	Labour	Allerdale
Harrington	Marjorie Rae	W. Cumbria Independent Group	Allerdale
Keswick	Andrew Lisser	Non-aligned	Allerdale
Maryport North	Carni McCarron-Holmes	Labour	Allerdale
Maryport South	Keith Little	Labour	Allerdale
Moss Bay and Moor Close	Gerald Humes	Labour	Allerdale
Seaton	Trevor Matthew Fee	Non-aligned	Allerdale
St. John's and Great Clifton	Joe Holliday	W. Cumbria Independent Group	Allerdale
St. Michael's	Alan Barry	Labour	Allerdale
Solway Coast	Tony Markley	Conservative	Allerdale
Thursby	Duncan Fairbairn	Conservative	Allerdale
Wigton	Roger Liddle	Labour	Allerdale
Dalton North	Barry Doughty	Labour	Barrow-in-Furness
Dalton South	Ernie Wilson	Labour	Barrow-in-Furness
Hawcoat	David Roberts	Conservative	Barrow-in-Furness
Hindpool	Anne Burns	Labour	Barrow-in-Furness
Newbarns and Parkside	Jane Murphy	Labour	Barrow-in-Furness
Old Barrow	John Murphy	Labour	Barrow-in-Furness
Ormsgill	William McEwan	Labour	Barrow-in-Furness
Risedale	Kevin Hamilton	Labour	Barrow-in-Furness
Roosecote	Helen Wall	Labour	Barrow-in-Furness
Walney North	Melvyn Worth	Labour	Barrow-in-Furness
Walney South	Mandy Telford	Labour	Barrow-in-Furness
Belah	Alan Toole	Conservative	Carlisle
Belle Vue	Ian Stockdale	Labour	Carlisle
Botcherby	Robert Betton	Non-aligned	Carlisle
Brampton	Lawrence Fisher	Conservative	Carlisle
Castle	William Whalen	Labour	Carlisle
Corby and Hayton	William Graham	Non-aligned	Carlisle
Currock	Reg Watson OBE	Labour	Carlisle
Dalston and Burgh	Trevor Allison	Liberal Democrat	Carlisle
Denton Holme	Hugh McDevitt	Labour	Carlisle
Harraby North	Cyril Weber	Labour	Carlisle
Harraby South	Deborah Earl	Labour	Carlisle
Houghton and Irthington	John Mallinson	Conservative	Carlisle
Longtown	Val Tarbitt	Conservative	Carlisle
Morton	John Bell	Labour	Carlisle
Stanwix Urban	Elizabeth Mallinson	Conservative	Carlisle
Upperby	Stewart Young	Labour	Carlisle
Wetheral	Nick Marriner	Conservative	Carlisle
Bransty	Eileen Weir	Labour	Copeland
Cleator Moor East and Frizington	Tim Knowles	Labour	Copeland
Cleator Moor West	Frank Morgan	Labour	Copeland
Egremont	David Southward MBE	Labour	Copeland
Egremont North and St Bees	Henry Wormstrup	Labour	Copeland
Gosforth	Norman Clarkson	Conservative	Copeland
Hillcrest and Hensingham	Christine Wharrier	Labour	Copeland
Howgate	Susan Hayman	Labour	Copeland
Kells and Sandwith	Wendy Skillcorn	Labour	Copeland
Millom	Brian Crawford	Conservative	Copeland
Millom Without	Keith Haigh Hitchen	Conservative	Copeland
Mirehouse	Michael Hawkins	Labour	Copeland
Alston and East Fellside	Mary Robinson	W. Cumbria Independent Group	Eden
Appleby	Martin Stephenson	Conservative	Eden
Eden Lakes	Neil Hughes	Liberal Democrat	Eden
Greystoke and Hesket	Bert Richardson	Conservative	Eden
Kirkby Stephen	Olivia (Libby) Bateman	Conservative	Eden
Penrith East	Patricia Bell	Liberal Democrat	Eden
Penrith North	Hilary Carrick	Conservative	Eden
Penrith Rural	Gary Strong	Conservative	Eden
Penrith West	Helen Fearon	Conservative	Eden
Cartmel	Rod Wilson	Liberal Democrat	South Lakeland
Grange	William Wearing	Conservative	South Lakeland
High Furness	David Fletcher	Liberal Democrat	South Lakeland
Kendal Castle	Clare Feeney-Johnson	Liberal Democrat	South Lakeland
Kendal Highgate	Geoffrey Cook	Liberal Democrat	South Lakeland
Kendal Nether	Shirley Evans	Liberal Democrat	South Lakeland
Kendal South	Brenda Gray	Liberal Democrat	South Lakeland
Kendal Strickland Fell	John McCreesh	Liberal Democrat	South Lakeland
Kent Estuary	Ian Stewart	Liberal Democrat	South Lakeland
Lakes (note: small part)	Heidi Halliday	Liberal Democrat	South Lakeland
Low Furness	Janet Willis	Liberal Democrat	South Lakeland
Lower Kentdale	Roger Bingham	Conservative	South Lakeland
Lyth Valley	Lyth Valley	Conservative	South Lakeland
Sedbergh and Kirkby Lonsdale	Nick Cotton	Liberal Democrat	South Lakeland
Ulverston East	Mark Wilson	Labour	South Lakeland
Ulverston West	James Airey	Labour	South Lakeland
Upper Kent	Stan Collins	Liberal Democrat	South Lakeland
Windermere	Jo Stephenson	Liberal Democrat	South Lakeland
