= Hindpool =

Settlement in Cumbria, England

Coordinates: 54.117°N 3.2305°W

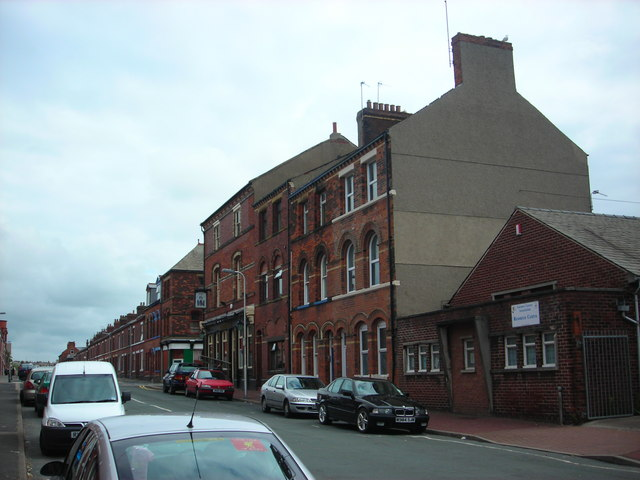
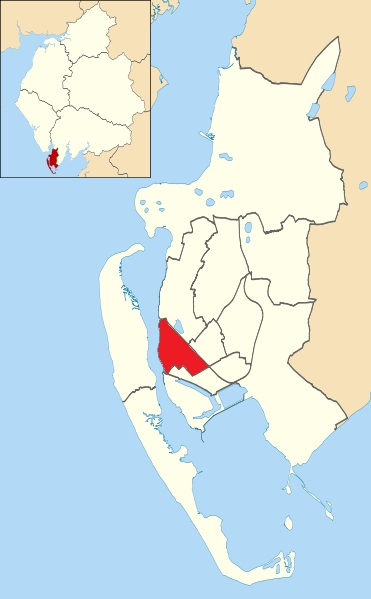
- Nelson Street, Hindpool looking north Hindpool shown within Barrow-in-Furness
- Population: 5,851 (2011 Ward)
- Unitary authority: Westmorland and Furness
- Ceremonial county: Cumbria
- Region: North West
- Country: England
- Sovereign state: United Kingdom
- Post town: BARROW-IN-FURNESS
- Postcode district: LA
- Dialling code: 01229
- Police: Cumbria
- Fire: Cumbria
- Ambulance: North West
- UK Parliament: Barrow and Furness

Hindpool is an area and electoral ward of Barrow-in-Furness, Cumbria, England. It is bordered by Barrow Island, Central Barrow, Ormsgill, Parkside and the Walney Channel, the local population stood at 5,851 in 2011. The ward covers the entire western half of the town centre and includes Barrow's main shopping district. Other local landmarks include the Furness College Channelside campus, the Dock Museum and the Main Public Library. Hindpool is also home to two stadia - Barrow Raiders' Craven Park and Barrow A.F.C.'s Holker Street.

Whilst still an electoral ward for Barrow Town Council, the ward was combined at a district/ local authority level with Barrow Island and Central wards in April 2023 following formation of the new Westmorland and Furness Local Authority and be named 'Old Barrow'.

== History ==
The Hindpool Estate appears on an 1843 Ordnance Survey map of what was then the village of Barrow within the parish of Dalton-in-Furness. Hindpool was at the forefront of Barrow's growth during the late 19th and early 20th century with numerous industries located within the area, most notably the Iron and Steelworks.

== Architecture ==
Barrow being a planned town has many fine buildings to show for it, Abbey Road in particular is lined by numerous listed buildings including the Barrow Main Public Library, the Duke of Edinburgh Hotel, Nan Tait Centre and Ramsden Hall. Almost all residential buildings in Hindpool are terraced housing, the population density of the area was 29.86 people per hectare in 2001 (three times Barrow average and eight times national population density average).

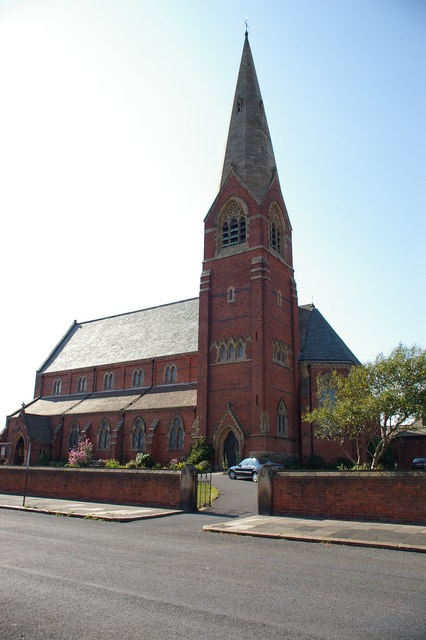
St. James' Church (Grade II*)

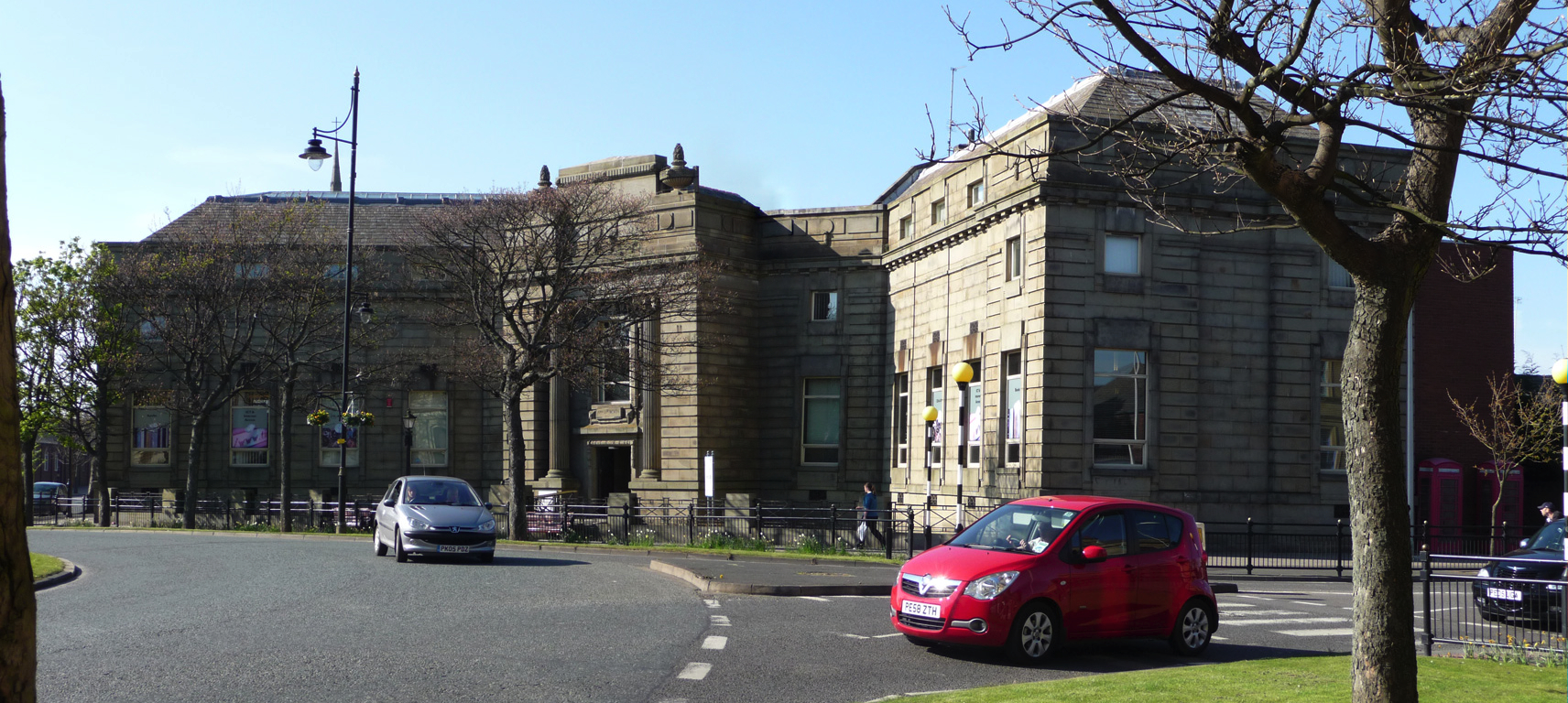
Barrow Main Public Library (Grade II)

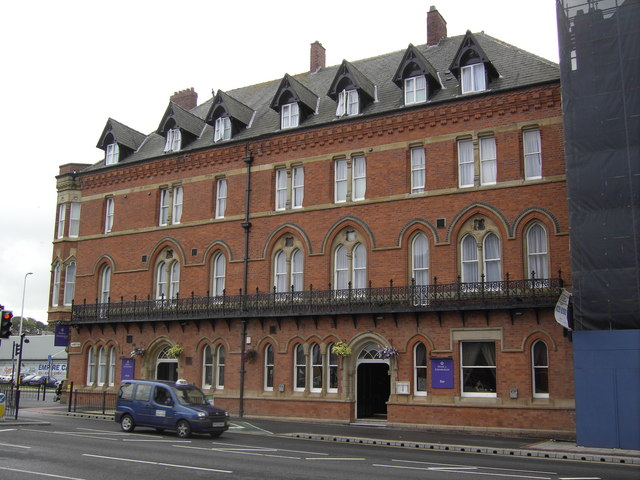
Duke of Edinburgh Hotel (Grade II)

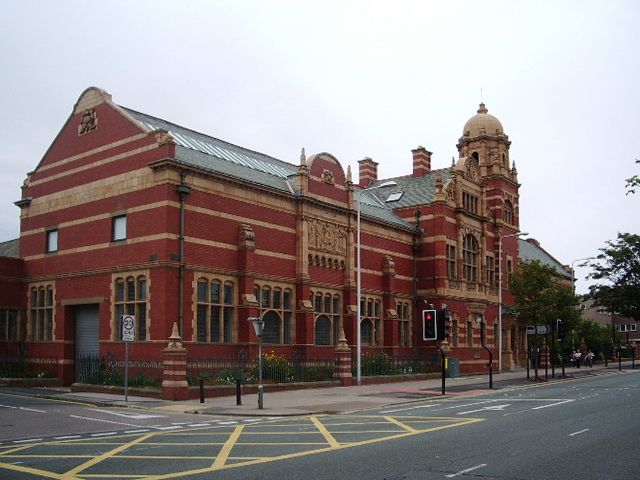
Nan Tait Centre (Grade II)

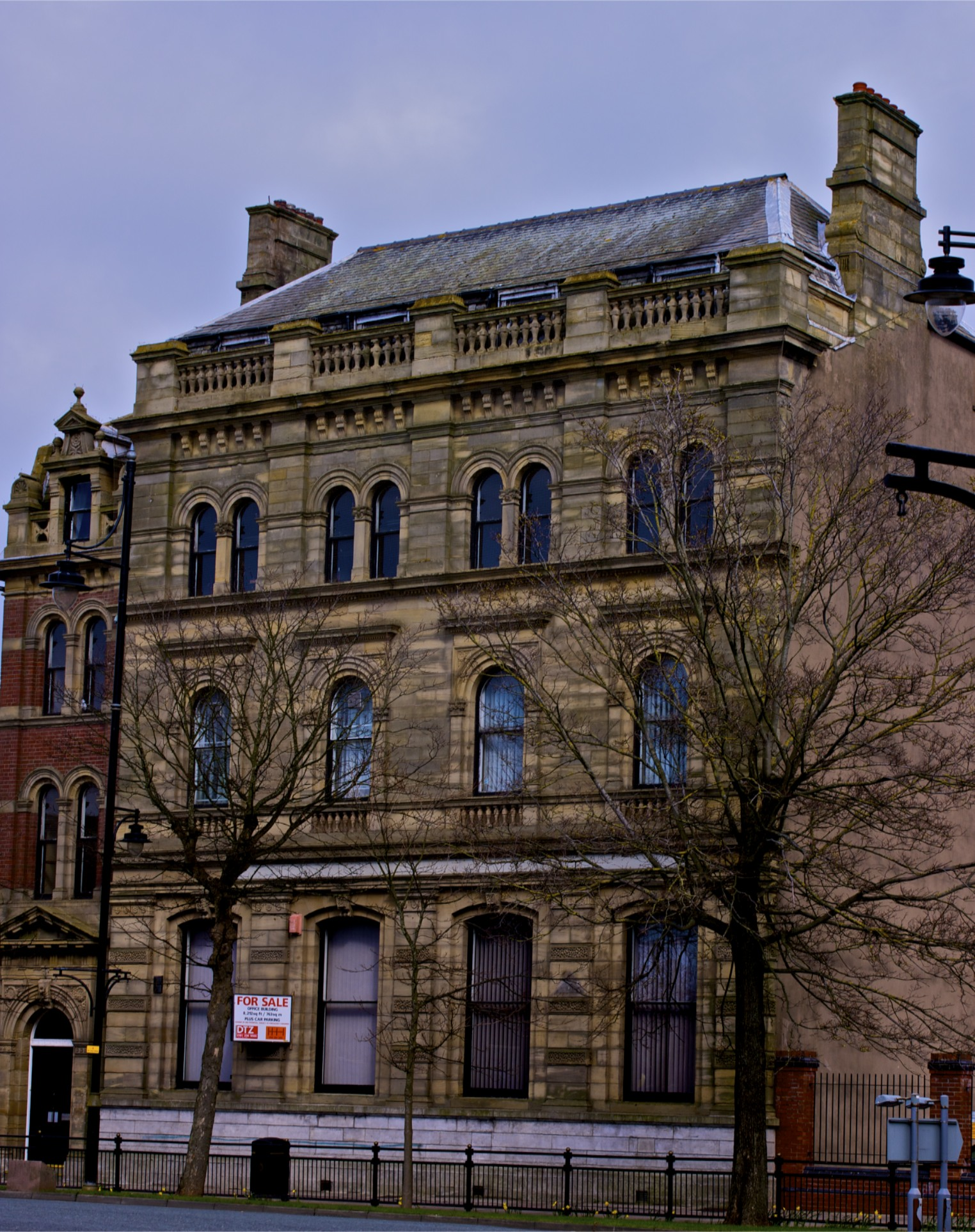
National Westminster Bank (Grade II)

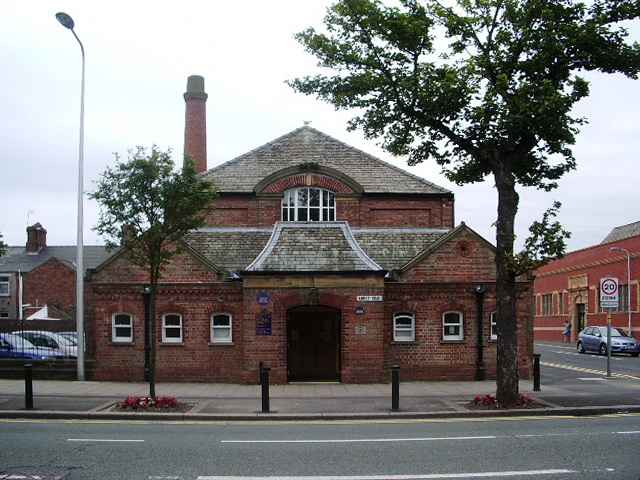
Ramsden Hall (Grade II)

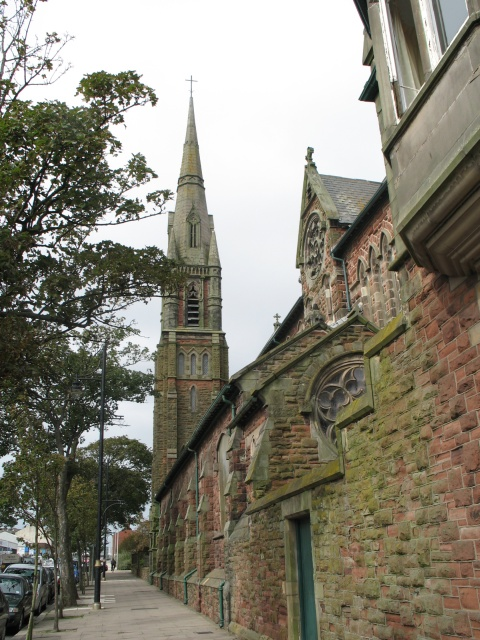
St. Mary of Furness Roman Catholic Church (Grade II)

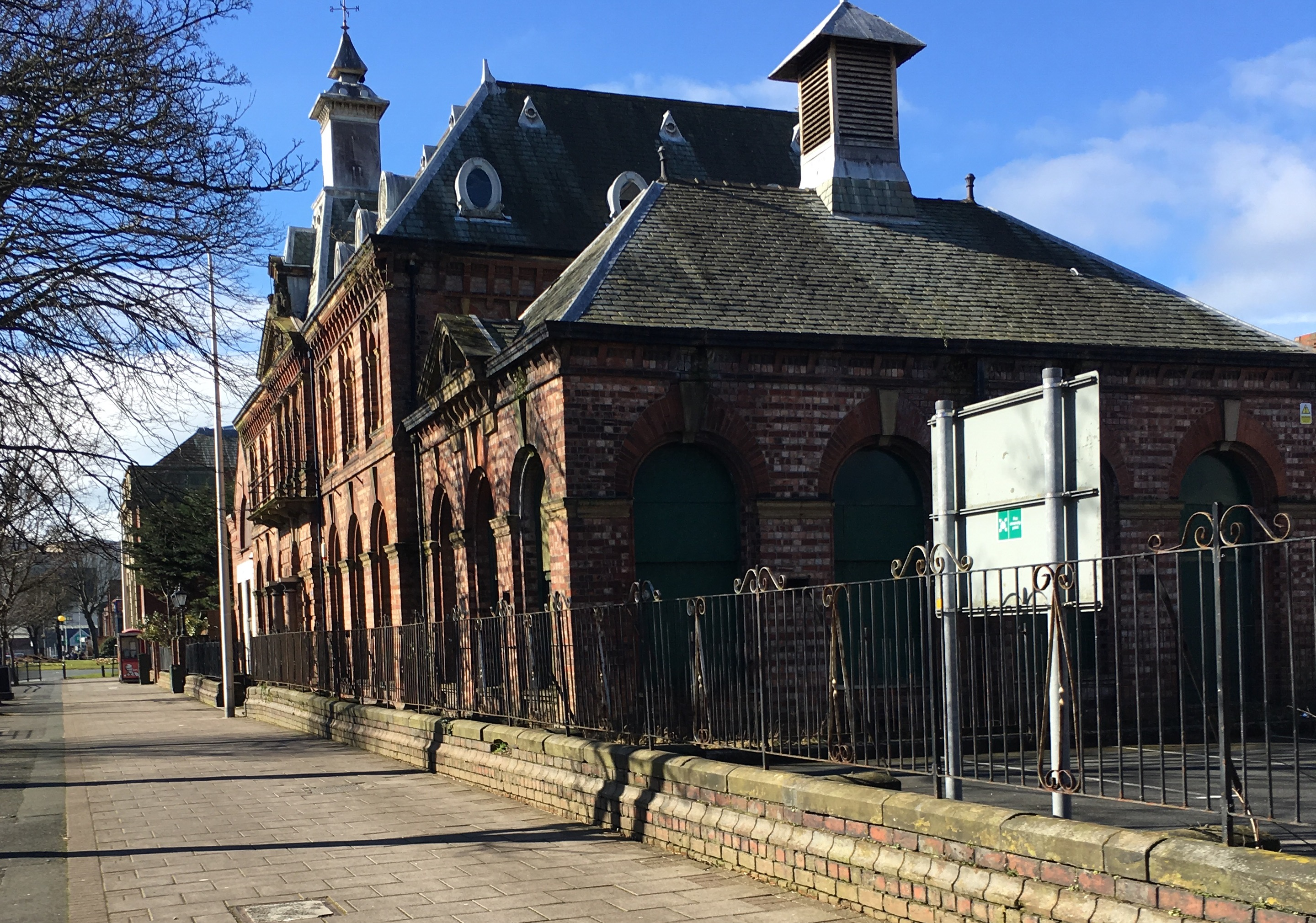
Abbey Road Working Men's Club (Grade II)

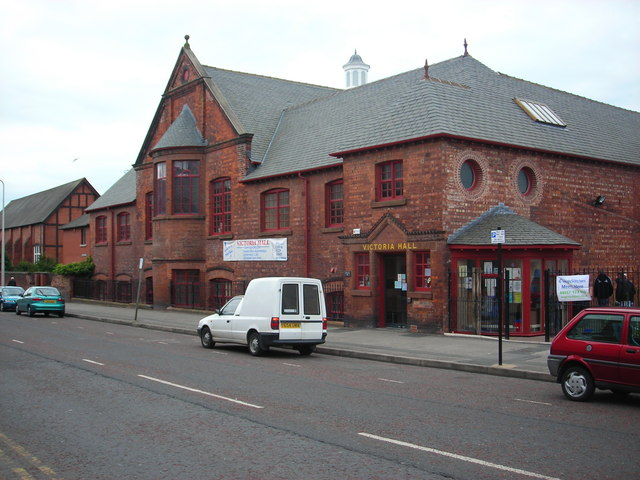
Victoria Hall (Grade II)

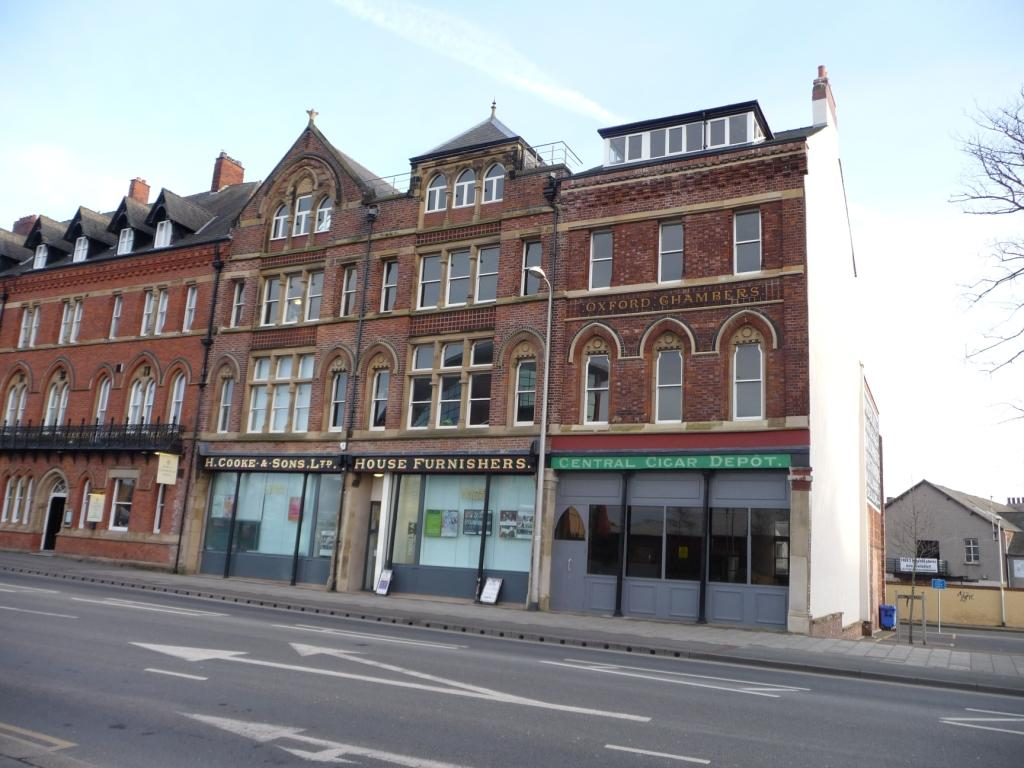
Cookes Building and Oxford Chambers (Grade II)

== Demographics ==
Vital statistics	Hindpool	Barrow-in-Furness	England
Religious individuals	76.95%	81.61%	77.71%
Non-religious individuals	14.29%	10.79%	14.59%
Religion withheld	8.76%	7.59%	7.69%
Individuals in fairly good to good health	83.48%	86.75%	90.97%
Individuals in bad health	16.52%	13.25%	9.03%
People aged 16–74 who are economically active	56.53%	60.84%	66.87%
People aged 16–74 who aren't economically active	43.47%	39.16%	33.13%
People aged 16–74 with no qualifications	39.71%	32.82%	28.85%

== Retail sector ==
The vast majority of Barrow's retail industry is located in Hindpool and not the central ward where Barrow Borough Council is seated. The primary shopping district in Hindpool and Barrow itself is Dalton Road and Portland Walk which are located in the south-eastern corner of the ward. Alongside Hindpool's traditional shopping streets are three retail parks, including Hindpool Retail Park, Hollywood Park and Walney Road Retail Park.

== Transportation ==
Hindpool has a well established road network which includes the A590 Walney Road which runs from Ormsgill in the north to Barrow Island in the south. Barrow's principal road, Abbey Road also has a 0.4 mile stretch that runs through east-central Hindpool. Barrow-in-Furness railway station is also located in Hindpool and the Cumbrian Coast Line marks the border between the ward and Ormsgill.

== See also ==
- Hindpool Retail Parks
- Barrow Hematite Steel Company
- Barrow Jute Works
