= St. Mary of Furness =

St. Mary of Furness could refer to the following:

- Furness Abbey, a cistercian monastery formally known as St. Mary of Furness on the outskirts of Barrow-in-Furness, England
- St. Mary of Furness Roman Catholic Church, a Catholic church also located in Barrow-in-Furness
