= Infield (disambiguation) =

Infield may refer to:

== Baseball ==
- Infield fly rule
- Infield
- Infield shift
- Infielder
- Infield hit

== Other ==
- Infield House, country house near Barrow-in-Furness.
