= Coat of arms of Barrow-in-Furness =

Coat of arms of the Borough of Barrow-in-Furness
- Armiger: Barrow-in-Furness and Barrow Town Council
- Adopted: 1867
- Crest: On a Wreath of the Colours out of the Battlements of a Tower a Ram's Head proper armed and collared Or.
- Shield: Gules on a Bend between a Serpent nowed in chief and a Stag trippant in base Or, an Arrow pointing upwards to a Bee volant proper upon a Chief Argent on Waves of the Sea a Paddle-Wheel Steamship under steam and canvas also proper.
- Motto: Semper Sursum

The coat of arms of Barrow-in-Furness are the official symbol of Barrow Town Council, North West England. The arms were officially granted on 13 December 1867 to the County Borough of Barrow-in-Furness. Upon the amalgamation of the County Borough and adjacent Dalton-in-Furness Urban District on 16 April 1975 the arms were adopted by the Barrow Borough Council. The Borough of Barrow-in-Furness was in turn subsumed by Westmorland and Furness Unitary Authority in 2023 with a new Barrow Town Council established concurrently.

== Symbolism ==
The chief of the arms incorporates a steam ship, emblematic of Barrow's shipping and port related industries. Below diagonally intercepting the arms is a band containing a bee and arrow to reflect the town's name (B-arrow). The stag and serpent either side are taken from the crests of the Duke of Buccleuch and the Duke of Devonshire respectively, who were the principal landowners at the time of Barrow's early growth. The ram's head a top of the arms symbolises Sir James Ramsden, Barrow's first mayor and a major figure in the development of the town. The Latin script below reads 'Semper Sursum', which is the town's motto meaning 'always upwards'.

== Use ==
The 'bee and arrow' element of the arms has been incorporated within the crest of Barrow A.F.C., while the arms themselves are emblazoned on several Barrow buildings including the Town Hall, Nan Tait Centre, John Whinnerah Institute and Abbey Road Working Men's Club.
