= Barrow-in-Furness Central Fire Station =

Grade II listed former fire station in Cumbria

Coordinates: 54.1131°N 3.2325°W

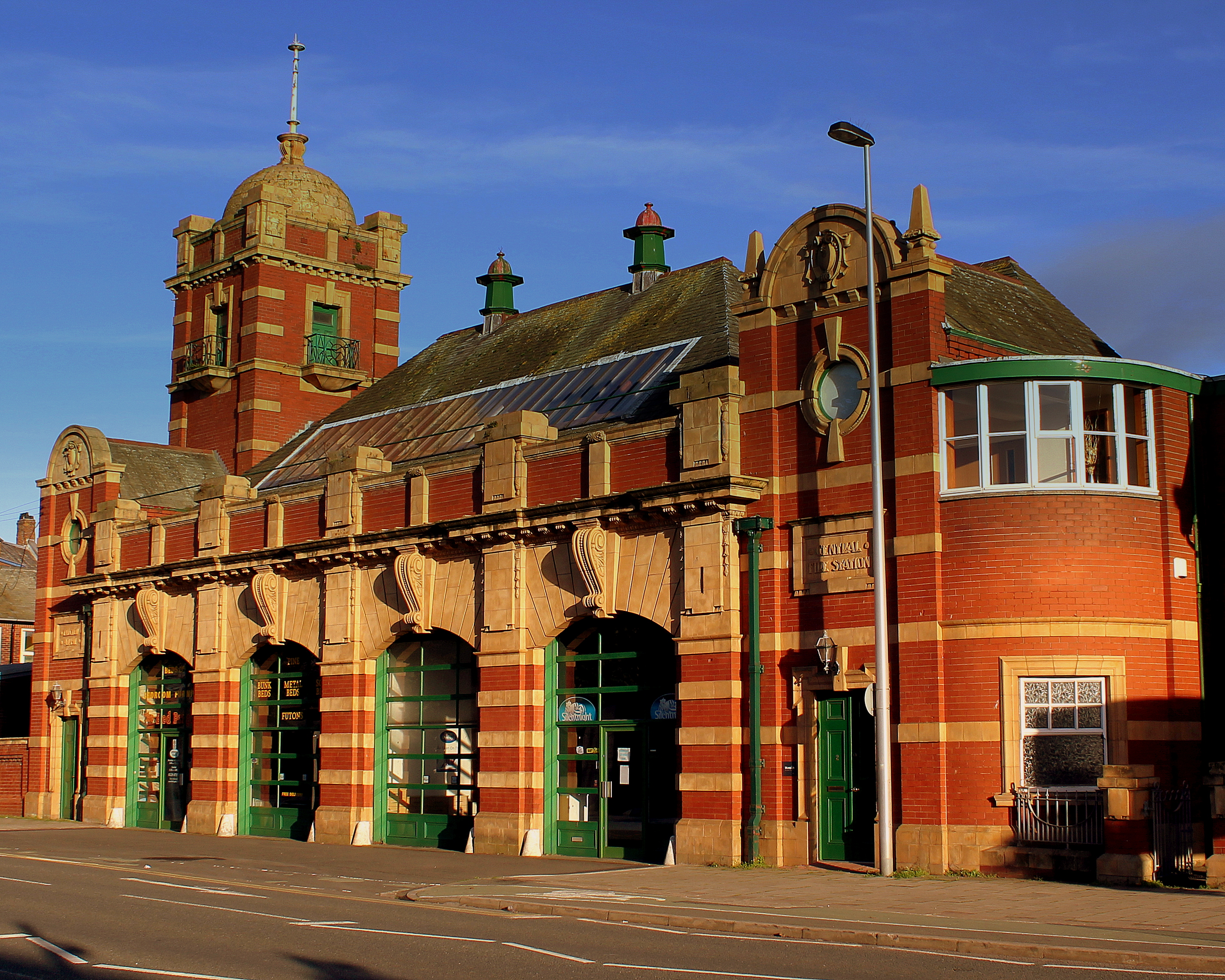
The former fire station photographed in October 2013

The Central Fire Station on Abbey Road in Barrow-in-Furness, Cumbria, England is a Grade II listed former fire station that has been described by Historic England as a "well-preserved example of the first generation of fire station built specifically for motorised appliances". Constructed in 1911 and opening a year later, the building served as the town's only station until Cumbria Fire and Rescue Service completed their first new-build station on Phoenix Road in 1996. The building is noted for its striking red brick facades and buff terracotta dressings, it bears a strong resemblance to the Technical School built less than 10 years prior nearby on the opposite side of Abbey Road. The building has since been converted into a 'Bed Brigade' store.

== See also ==
- Listed buildings in Barrow-in-Furness
