= Oxford Chambers =

Building in Barrow-in-Furness, Cumbria, England

Coordinates: 54.116570°N 3.226707°W

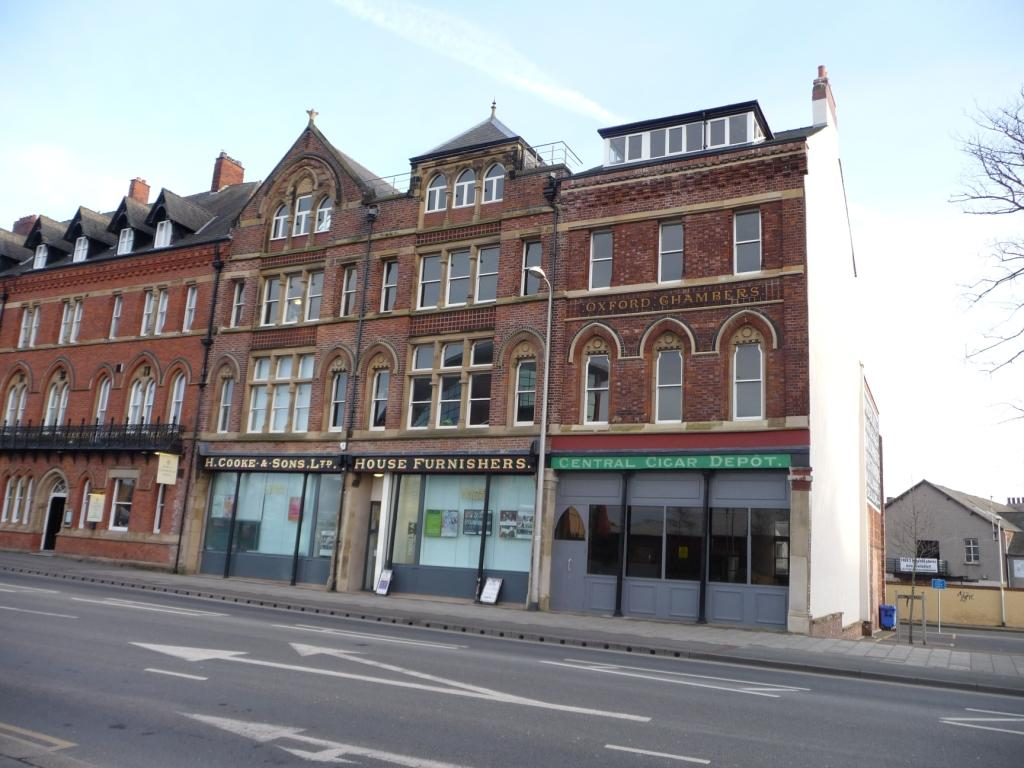
Oxford Chambers (right) in 2015

Oxford Chambers is a Grade II listed building located on Abbey Road in Barrow-in-Furness, Cumbria, England. Oxford Chambers was constructed in 1875 with the intention of it functioning as a commercial property, however the new town's first higher grades school opened within the building in 1880. The school relocated to a larger premises on Duke Street in 1889. A notable feature of the building is a sign reading 'Central Cigar Depot', it also housed a shop selling office supplies in the late 20th century. Despite this, it is most known for containing the extension of the adjacent Travellers Rest social club (which was in turn demolished in 2011). Oxford Chambers lies at the very northern perimeter of the Central Barrow conservation area close to The Duke of Edinburgh Hotel and the neighbouring Cooke's Building.

== See also ==
- Listed buildings in Barrow-in-Furness
