= Abbey Road Working Men's Club =

Working men's club in Barrow-in-Furness, Cumbria, England

Coordinates: 54.1149°N 3.2300°W

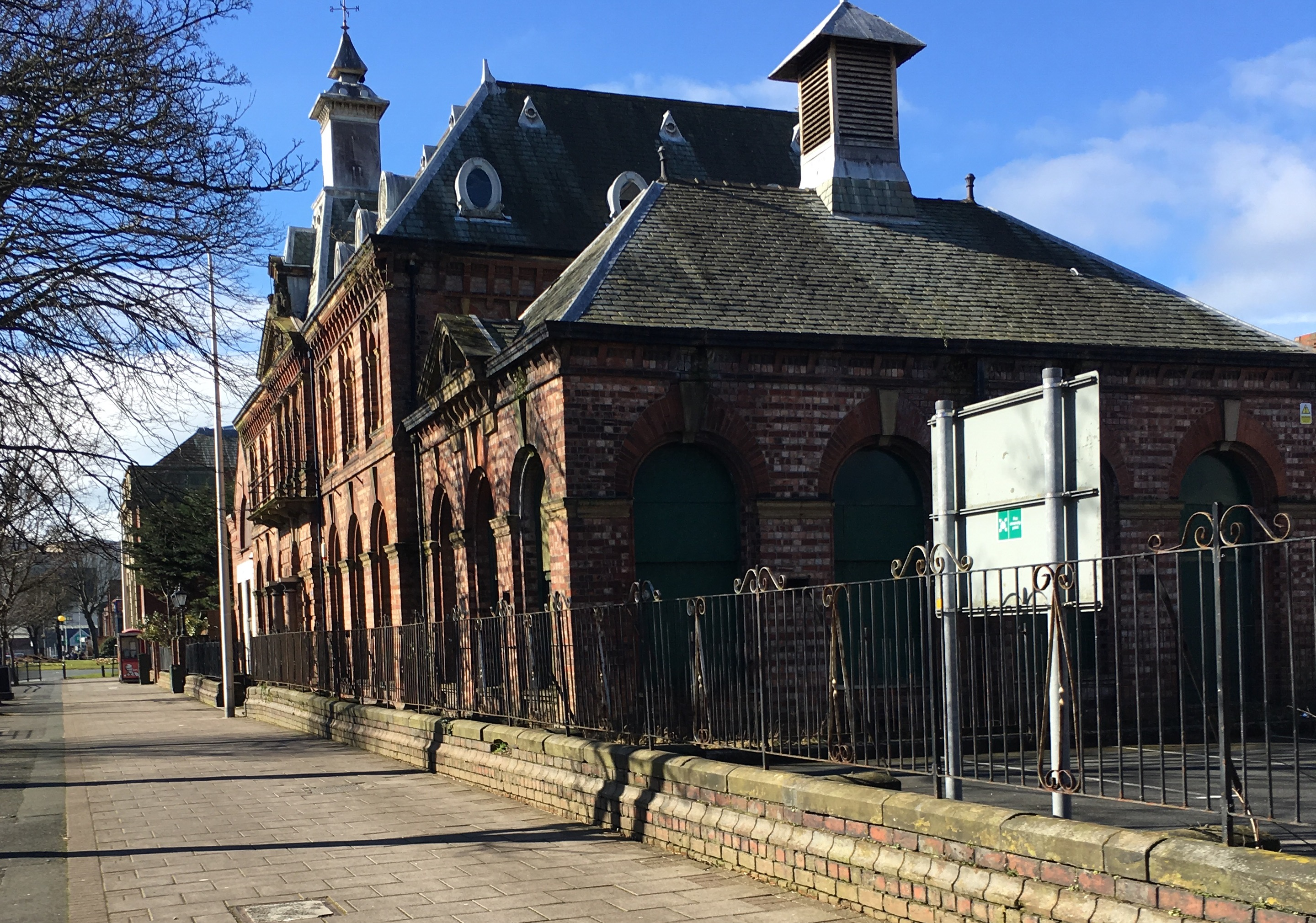
The building photographed in March 2016 prior to significant fire damage

Abbey Road Working Men's Club (also known as Lord's Tavern and the House of Lords) is a partially destroyed Grade II listed building located at Abbey Road close to Ramsden Square in Barrow-in-Furness, Cumbria, England. Design by architect Henry Darbishire it was completed in 1871 and extended in the early 20th century, notable features previously included an ornate hipped roof with multiple oval dormers and an engraving of the Borough Coat of Arms. During the building's lifetime it functioned as a social club and later public house.

Abbey Road Working Men's Club was granted listed status in 1976. Enforcement action was taken on the building's owners in 2007 by the Planning Inspectorate to remove the national flag which had been painted on its windows in celebration of the 2006 FIFA World Cup. It was considered to be harmful to the appearance of both the listed building and wider Conservation Area in which it is located.

On 11 January 2017 a fire gutted the building, entirely destroying its 20th century extension, the iconic roof and leaving an empty shell of an interior. The surviving walls are in a precarious condition and could be potentially demolished in their entirety.

== See also ==
- Listed buildings in Barrow-in-Furness
