= Infield House =

Coordinates: 54.1313°N 3.2078°W

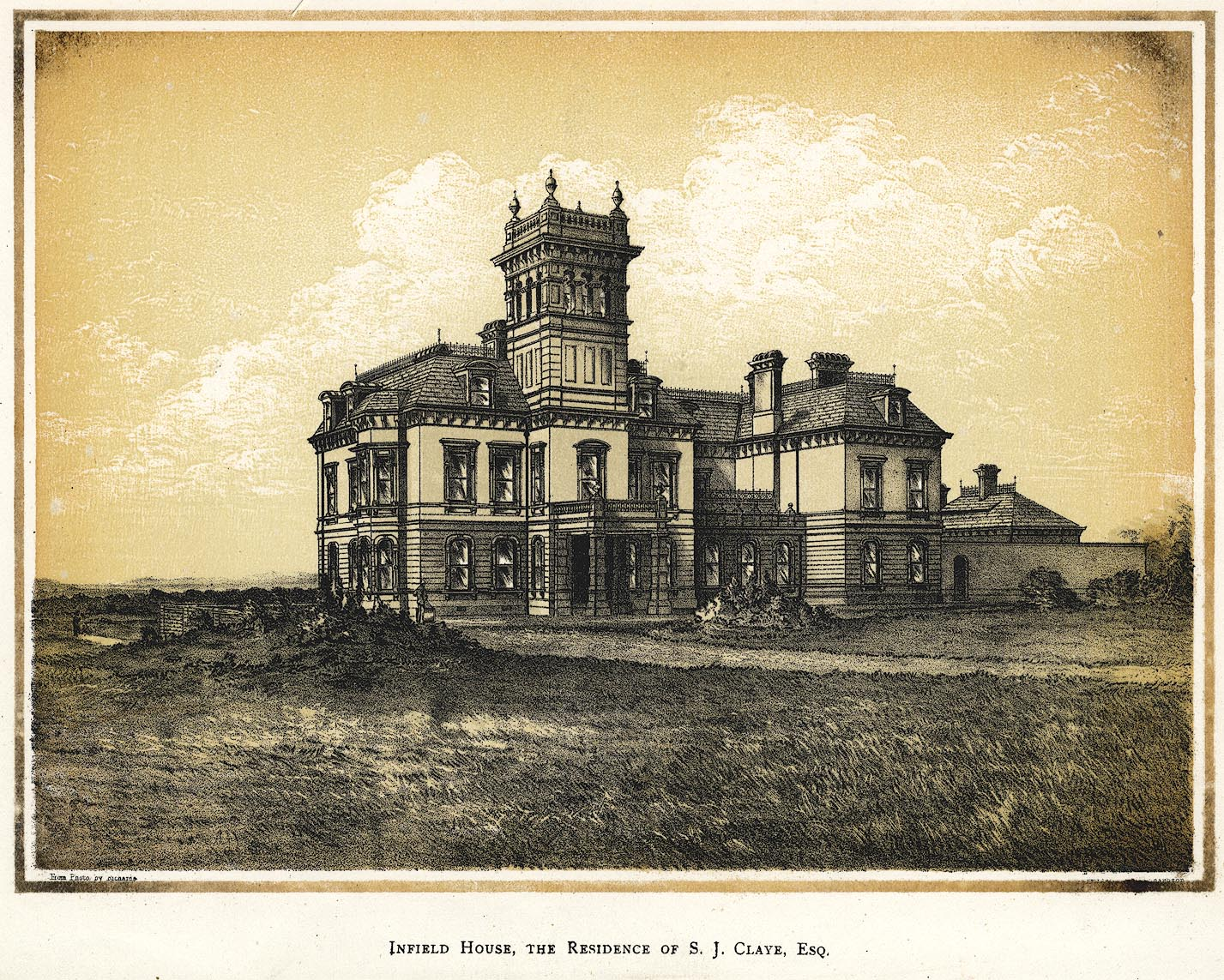
1870s colour print of Infield House by Richards of Barrow-in-Furness

Infield House (also known as 'Infield Park', or simply 'Infield') was a large late-19th century country house located to the north of Barrow-in-Furness, Cumbria, England. Infield House was built adjacent to Abbey Road as a residence for businessman Samuel John Claye, the owner of Claye's Wagon Works. After Claye's death in 1886, the house and Wagon Works were sold on and later became a convalescent home. The facilities closure lead to Infield House falling into a state of disrepair and it was eventually demolished in the 1970s and replaced by a housing estate named Infield Gardens. The only remaining feature of Infield House is the boundary wall and gate piers which mark the entrance to the modern housing estate.
