= Ramsden Hall =

Building in Barrow-in-Furness, Cumbria, England

Coordinates: 54.115°N 3.230°W

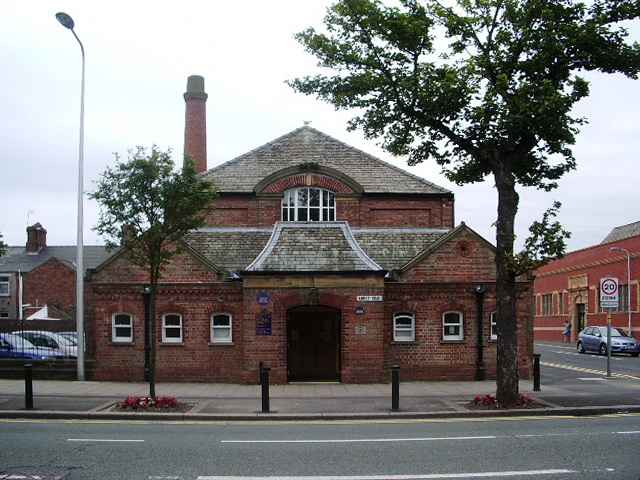
Ramsden Hall viewed from Abbey Road in 2007

Ramsden Hall located at 48 Abbey Road in Barrow-in-Furness, Cumbria, England is a Grade II listed former public bath house. Funded by industrialist and local mayor Sir James Ramsden it was constructed in 1872 and was relatively small in comparison to other public baths in Barrow. Despite no longer serving its original purpose Ramsden Hall stands as the only remaining example of a 19th-century public bath in the town. For a period of its history, the building served as an annexe of the adjacent Technical School although at present it is occupied by offices of the Citizens Advice Bureau.

== See also ==
- Listed buildings in Barrow-in-Furness
- Baths and wash houses in Britain
