= Abbey Road, Barrow-in-Furness =

Street in Barrow-in-Furness, United Kingdom

Coordinates: 54.11325°N 3.23291°W

Abbey Road
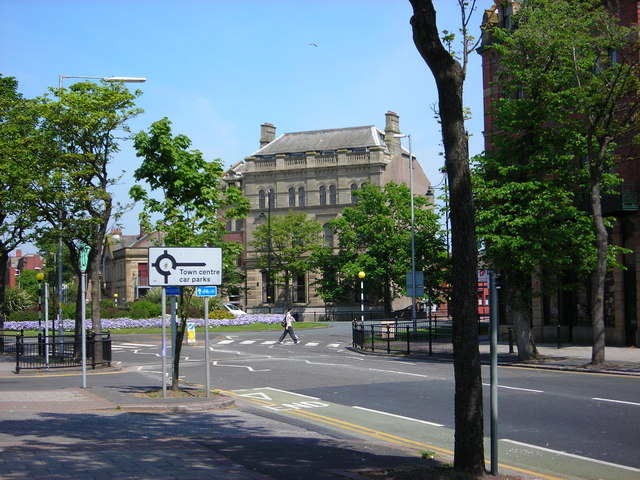
- Abbey Road, south at Ramsden Square, Barrow in 2006.
- Length: 3.7 mi (6.0 km)
- Location: Barrow and Dalton-in-Furness, Cumbria, England, United Kingdom
- Postal code: LA13 (east); LA14 (south and west); LA15 (north)
- North end: Market Street
- South end: Hindpool Road (A590/A5087)

Abbey Road is the principal north to south arterial road through Barrow-in-Furness, Cumbria, England.

== Background ==
Abbey Road's name derives from Furness Abbey, a former Cistercian monastery along the route of the road.

Beginning at Market Street, in the centre of Dalton-in-Furness, the road runs 3.7 miles (6.0 km) south and terminates at Hindpool Road, close to the centre of Barrow where the A590 and A5087 merge. Abbey Road predates Barrow itself although it was substantially upgraded to its current appearance during the mid-19th century, when the town was undergoing dramatic growth. The 2.5 miles (4.0 km) of Abbey Road that runs through Barrow is a tree-lined boulevard with multiple lanes, while the northern section of the road beyond Mill Brow is single lane, winding and more rural in nature. Sites along Abbey Road include Dalton town centre, Furness General Hospital, Barrow Park, Barrow-in-Furness railway station, Barrow town centre and several of Barrow's retail parks.

Until 1932, the Barrow-in-Furness Tramways Company operated a tram line along Abbey Road from Ramsden Square to the current location of Furness General Hospital.

== Junctions and intersections ==
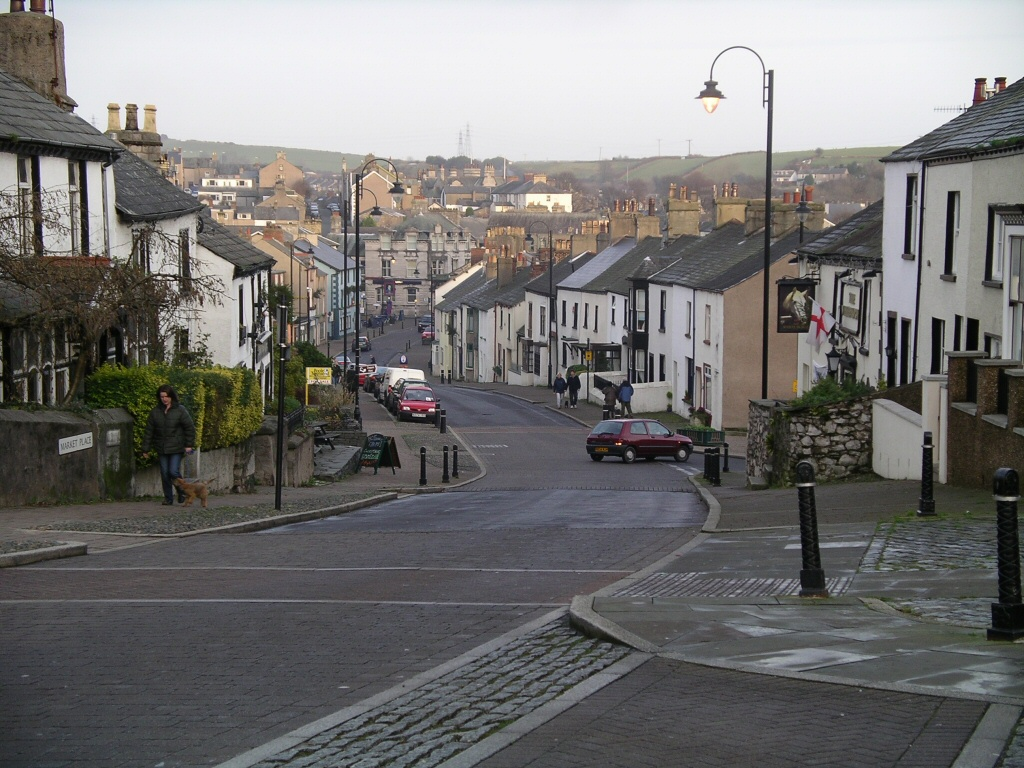
The junction at Market Street and Abbey Road in Dalton in Furness, (Weint Corner)

Significant intersections on the system include (from north to south):

- Market Street
- Long Lane
- Park Road
- Dalton Lane
- Rating Lane
- Hawcoat Lane/Hollow Lane
- Cheltenham Street/Park Drive
- Holker Street/Rawlinson Street
- Hartington Street/Dalton Road
- Duke Street at Ramsden Square
- Hindpool Road

== Listed buildings ==
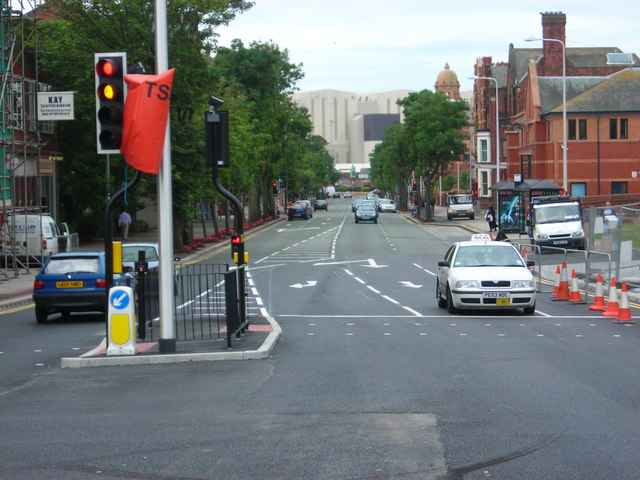
Intersection at Holker and Rawlinson Street in Barrow

The southern stretch of Abbey Road from Rawlinson Street to Hindpool Road lies entirely within the Central Barrow Conservation Area, the list below includes every listed building located on Abbey Road.

- 298 Abbey Road (Grade II)
- Abbey House Hotel (Grade II*)
- Abbey Road Conservatives Club (Grade II)
- Abbotswood Lodge (Grade II)
- Barrow Main Public Library (Grade II)
- Central Fire Station (Grade II)
- Cooke's Building (Grade II)
- Custom House (Grade II)
- Duke of Edinburgh Hotel (Grade II)
- John Whinnerah Institute (Grade II)
- Mill Brow Lodge (Grade II)
- Nan Tait Centre (Grade II)
- National Westminster Bank (Grade II)
- Oxford Chambers (Grade II)
- Ramsden Hall (Grade II)
- Statue of Sir James Ramsden (Grade II)
- St. Mary's Church (Grade II*)
- White Horse Public House (Grade II)
- Working Men's Club and Institute (Grade II)
