= St Mary of Furness Roman Catholic Church =

Church in Barrow-in-Furness, Cumbria, England

St Mary of Furness Church
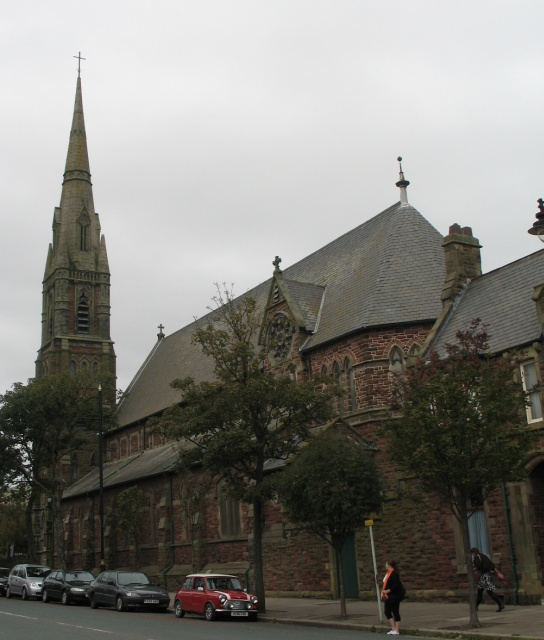

Religion
- Affiliation: Roman Catholic
- Diocese: Diocese of Lancaster
- Province: Province of Liverpool
- Status: Active

Location
- Location: Hindpool, Barrow-in-Furness, Cumbria, England
- Interactive map of St Mary of Furness Church
- Coordinates: 54°06′55″N 3°13′58″W

Architecture
- Completed: 1867

Website
- Diocese of Lancaster: St Mary of Furness

St Mary of Furness is a Roman Catholic church located on Duke Street in Barrow-in-Furness, England. The congregation was founded in 1858 and current building constructed between 1866 and 1867.

It was built with £6,000 donated by Spencer Cavendish the 8th Duke of Devonshire. Designed by English architect E. W. Pugin, the spacious church originally seated 800, but has now been expanded to accommodate around 1,000 worshippers. In 1976 St. Mary of Furness and the church presbytery were granted Grade II listed status by Historic England.

The church's organ contains approximately 3,000 pipes and was originally built by Messrs. Hill and Son for the Royal Liverpool Philharmonic Society. The spire of St. Mary of Furness wasn't added to the church until 1888, despite being a key component of the original plans.

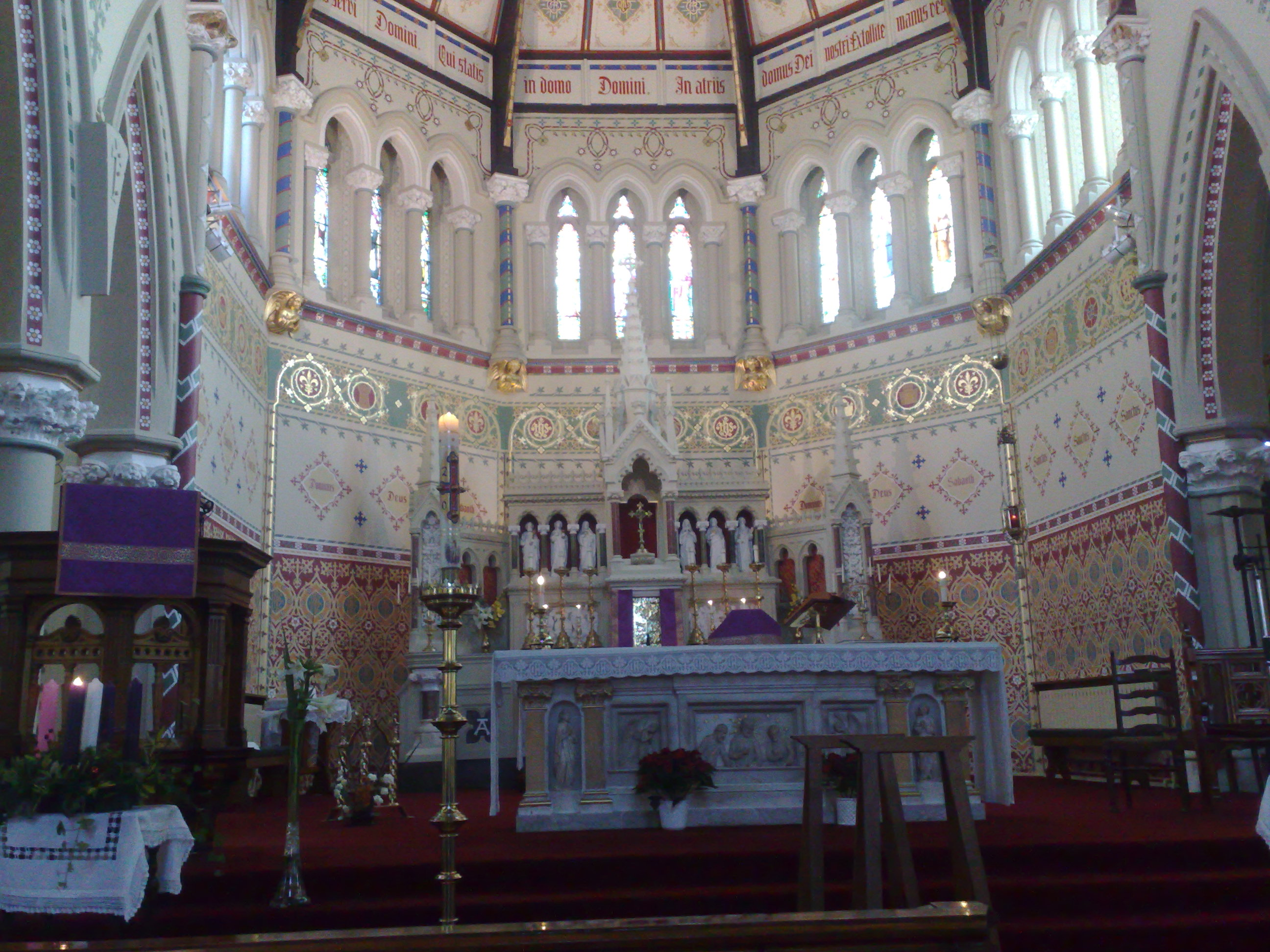
Interior of St. Mary's including the altar

The church was placed on Historic England's Heritage at Risk Register as a result of stone decay to the spire. Repair work was subsequently undertaken in 2015 financed by the Heritage Lottery Fund and Places of Worship scheme.

== See also ==
- Listed buildings in Barrow-in-Furness
- List of places of worship in Barrow-in-Furness
