= Hindpool Retail Parks =

Retail parks in Barrow-in-Furness, England

Coordinates: 54.112°N 3.23°W

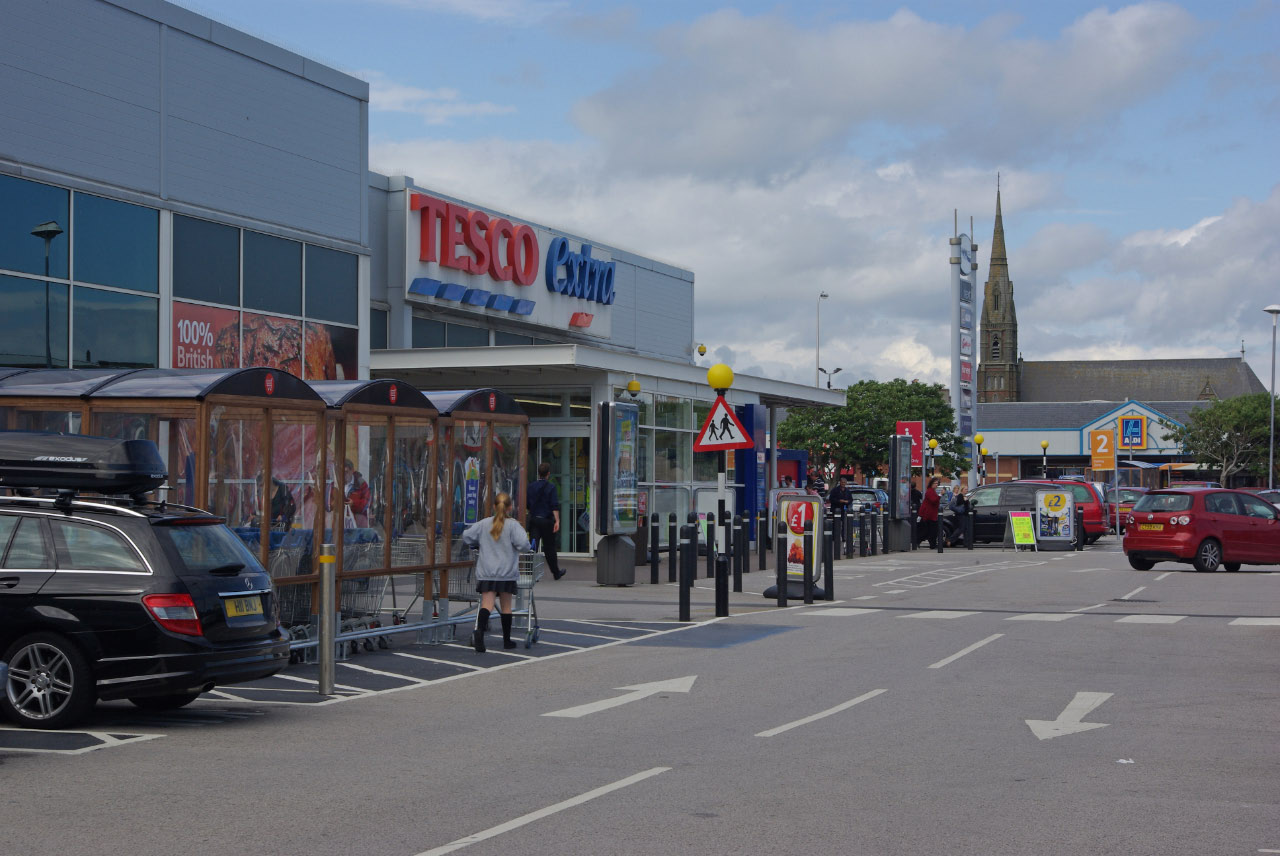
Tesco Extra, Cornerhouse Retail Park in 2012

The Hindpool Retail Parks are a set of four conjoined retail parks in the Hindpool area of Barrow-in-Furness, England, United Kingdom (with the exception of one which straddles the border with Central Barrow). Some thirty stores and leisure facilities contain a total of 43,000 m^{2} (460,000 sq ft) of retail space (around one quarter of the borough's 199,000 m^{2} (2,140,000 sq ft) of retail floorspace). The four retail parks are Cornerhouse Retail Park, Cornmill Crossing, Hindpool Retail Park and Hollywood Park. The largest and only other retail park in Barrow is Walney Road Retail Park - Asda, Argos, Home Bargains, Matalan, Starbucks and Stollers.

== Site history ==
All of the retail parks were built on former industrial land that during the early to mid-20th century played a major role in not only Barrow's but the entire country's economy. Hindpool Retail Park, alongside Craven Park stadium were built upon the site of the Barrow Jute Works which operated from 1870 to 1948. Cornerhouse Park and Cornmill Crossing were built on a site originally occupied by a cornmill and large interchange of the Furness Railway, while Hollywood Park was constructed on the southern perimeter of the former iron and steelworks which was operated by the Barrow Hematite Steel Company between 1859 and 1963 and was at one point the largest steelworks on earth.

== Cornerhouse Retail Park ==
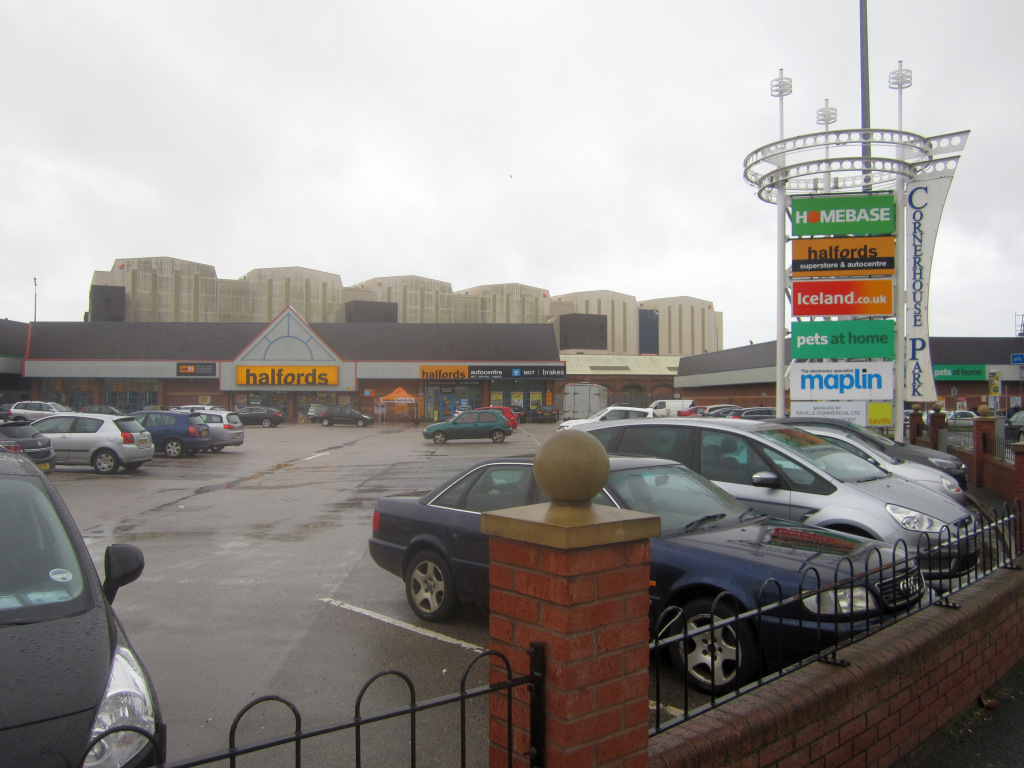
Cornerhouse Retail Park

Cornerhouse Retail Park has seen many changes throughout its history, Tesco has seen two huge expansions (including the addition of a large mezzanine floor) and has become a Tesco Extra store, Homebase also created a mezzanine floor to keep up with the competition from the likes of B&Q, although the store has now become a B&M, whilst Currys had a unit in the park before relocating to Hollywood Park when it was completed.

Unit	Retail/ Leisure Space	Tenant
A	833 m^{2} (8,970 sq ft)	Iceland
B	570 m^{2} (6,100 sq ft)	The Gym Group
C	651 m^{2} (7,010 sq ft)	Pets at Home
D	1,396 m^{2} (15,030 sq ft)	Halfords
E	3,367 m^{2} (36,240 sq ft)	B&M^{1},^{3}
N/A	7,300 m^{2} (79,000 sq ft)	Tesco Extra^{1}

== Cornmill Crossing ==
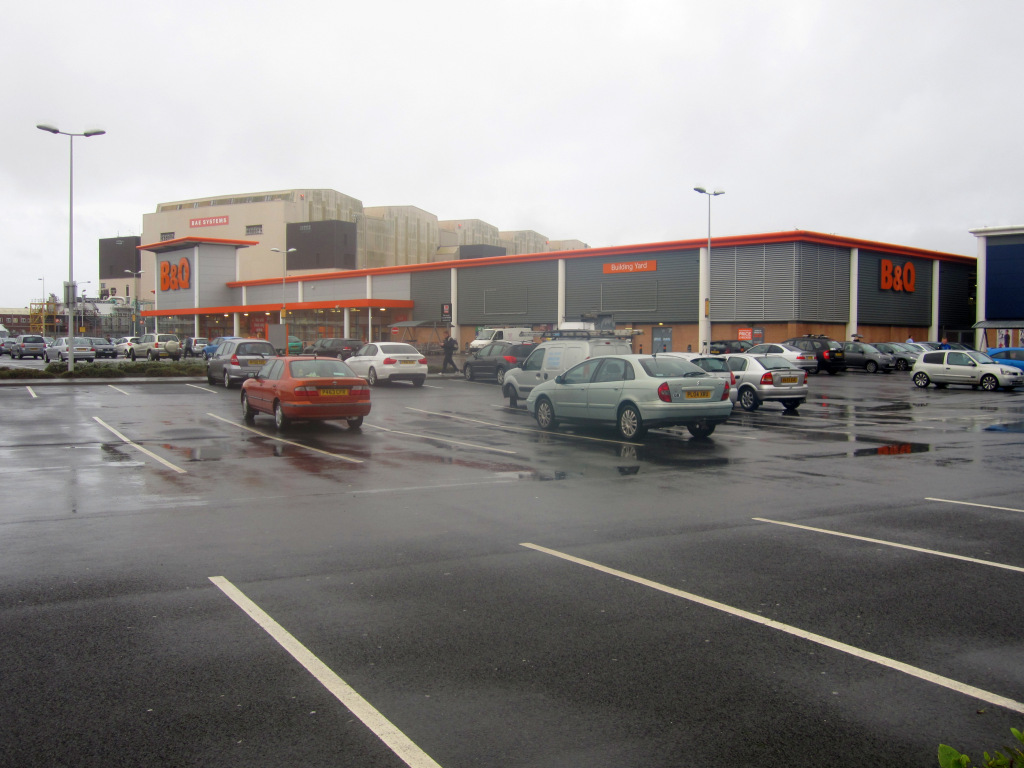
B&Q store, Cornmill Crossing

Cornmill Crossing is the newest addition to the Hindpool Retail Parks complex. Despite it only being home to two units, both are amongst the larger stores in the area. Planning permission for the retail park was sought in January 2007 for the 10,186 m^{2} (109,640 sq ft) site which was formerly occupied by United Utilities water works, the plans were quickly approved to following month. An archeological dig was conducted by Greenlane Archeology of Ulverston. This was to uncover the remains of a steam cornmill built in 1870, but demolished in 1972 following a fire in the building which had stood empty for five years. The complex was designed by Craig and Green Architects and built in under a year. B&Q were the first top open their doors in July 2008, the new 'Mini Warehouse' was built to replace a rundown superstore on nearby Duke Street, the B&Q contains roughly 6,800 m^{2} (73,000 sq ft) of retail space - including a 1,400 m^{2} (15,000 sq ft) garden centre and 740 m^{2} (8,000 sq ft) builders' yard. The other unit in Cornmill Park - a JJB Sports^{2} Superstore, Fitness Club and Gym opened in September 2008. The two story building has a total floor area of 3,914 m^{2} (42,130 sq ft) and includes a 20 m (66 ft) long swimming pool. The store and fitness club now goes by the name DW Sports Fitness after it was acquired by Dave Whelan in March 2009.

== Hindpool Retail Park ==
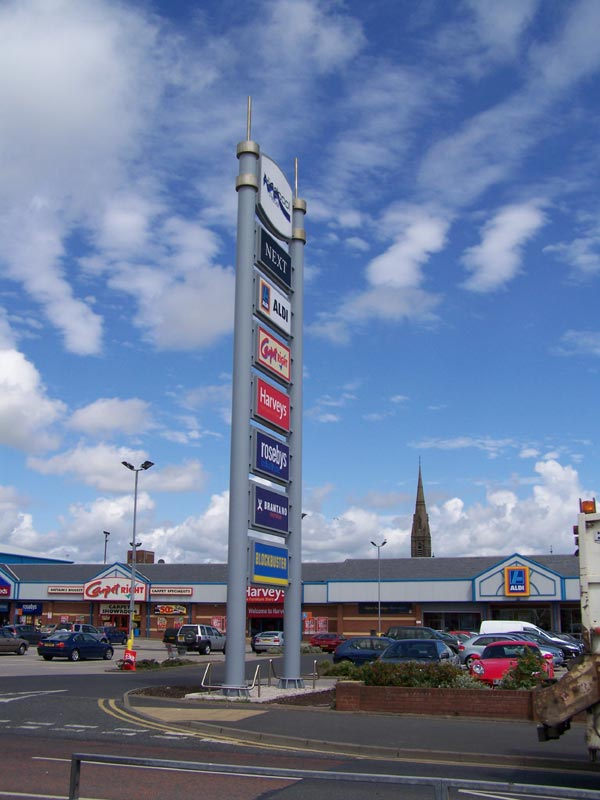
Sign marking the entrance to Hindpool Retail Park

Hindpool Retail Park is the only one of the four retail parks to have increased its number of units since opening. Next and the former Brantano were built in 2005 on the site of a former women's institute that straddled the retail park, while a smaller building was constructed within the park itself in 2015 to house Costa Coffee and Subway.

Plans in 2019 revealed that Burger King had plans to open up a store in the vacant Frankie and Benny's restaurant.

Unit	Retail/ Leisure Space	Tenant
1	697 m^{2} (7,500 sq ft)	Poundland
2	937 m^{2} (10,090 sq ft)	Carpetright
3	763 m^{2} (8,210 sq ft)	Bensons for Beds
4	1,180 m^{2} (12,700 sq ft)	DFS Furniture
5	372 m^{2} (4,000 sq ft)	Burger King
6	619 m^{2} (6,660 sq ft)	Cancer Research UK
7	946 m^{2} (10,180 sq ft)	Next^{5}
8A	93 m^{2} (1,000 sq ft)	Subway
8B	150 m^{2} (1,600 sq ft)	Costa Coffee
N/A	2,930 m^{2} (31,500 sq ft)	The Range Home and Leisure

== Hollywood Park ==
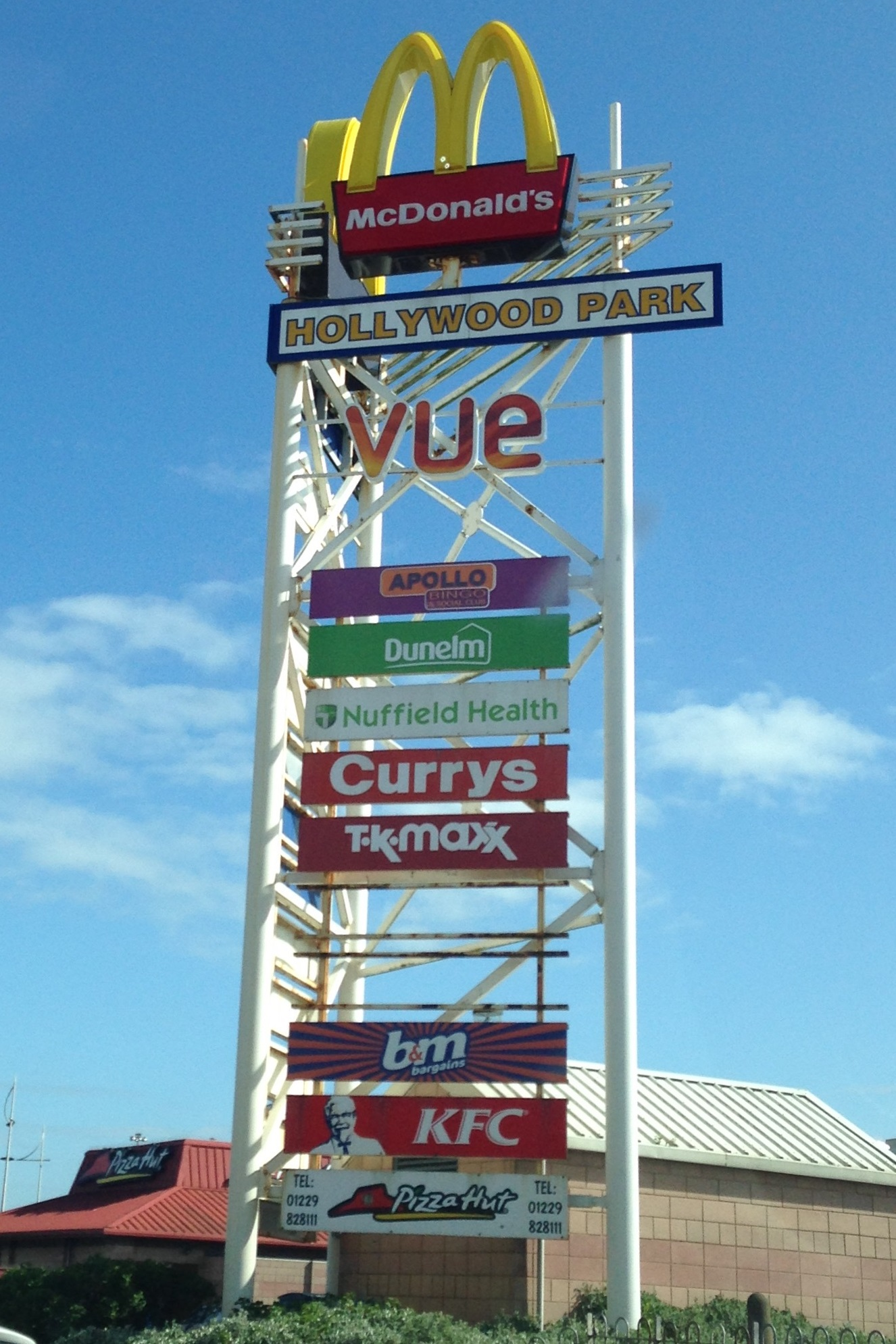
Sign marking entrance to Hollywood Park

Hollywood Park is the most diverse of the four retail parks, as well as the second largest. Designed by Craig and Green Architects, plans were first submitted for a new leisure and retail complex in Barrow in October 1997, the local council approved these plans in April 1998. Throughout the rest of 1998 and 1999, a number of tenants lined up to move into Hollywood Park - with most of these being swiftly approved. Construction of the complex was completed just after the turn of the millennium. Electrical stores Comet and Currys both moved into Hollywood Park from smaller premises in Cornerhouse Retail Park. Hollywood Park is home to three food outlets, the largest cinema in Cumbria as well as a number of retail outlets with mezzanine floors. JJB Sports moved to a larger premises in Cornmill Crossing in 2008, whilst the likes of Barrow Superbowl and Klaussner furniture fell victims to bankruptcy. Plans were recently approved for Aldi to combine the two former Dreams and B&M Bargains units into one, 1,395 square metre, 'superstore'. In total there are some 650 parking spaces within Hollywood Park, a detailed list of its current tenants are compiled below.

Unit	Retail/ Leisure Space	Tenant
A	1,395 m^{2} (15,020 sq ft)	Smyths Toys Superstores
B	3,658 m^{2} (39,370 sq ft)	Dunelm Mill^{1},^{4}
C	1,134 m^{2} (12,210 sq ft)	Nuffield Health Club^{2}
D	1,484 m^{2} (15,970 sq ft)	Vue Cinemas
E/H	1,679 m^{2} (18,070 sq ft)	Currys
E/H	932 m^{2} (10,030 sq ft)	Aldi
J	2,000 m^{2} (22,000 sq ft)	T.K.Maxx^{1}
K	238 m^{2} (2,560 sq ft)	KFC
L	292 m^{2} (3,140 sq ft)	Church Walk Veterinary Centre
M	289 m^{2} (3,110 sq ft)	McDonald's

== See also ==
- Retail park

== Notes ==
- ^1 Unit contains a mezzanine floor
- ^2 Unit contains two storeys
- ^3 The floor area for B&M excludes the garden centre and mezzanine floor which were constructed by former tenants Homebase
- ^4 Dunelm Mill was formerly Barrow Superbowl
- ^5 Unit was built on the site of the former John Whinnerah Institute
