= Abbey House, Barrow-in-Furness =

Neo-Elizabethan H-plan mansion in England

Coordinates: 54°08′19″N 3°12′01″W

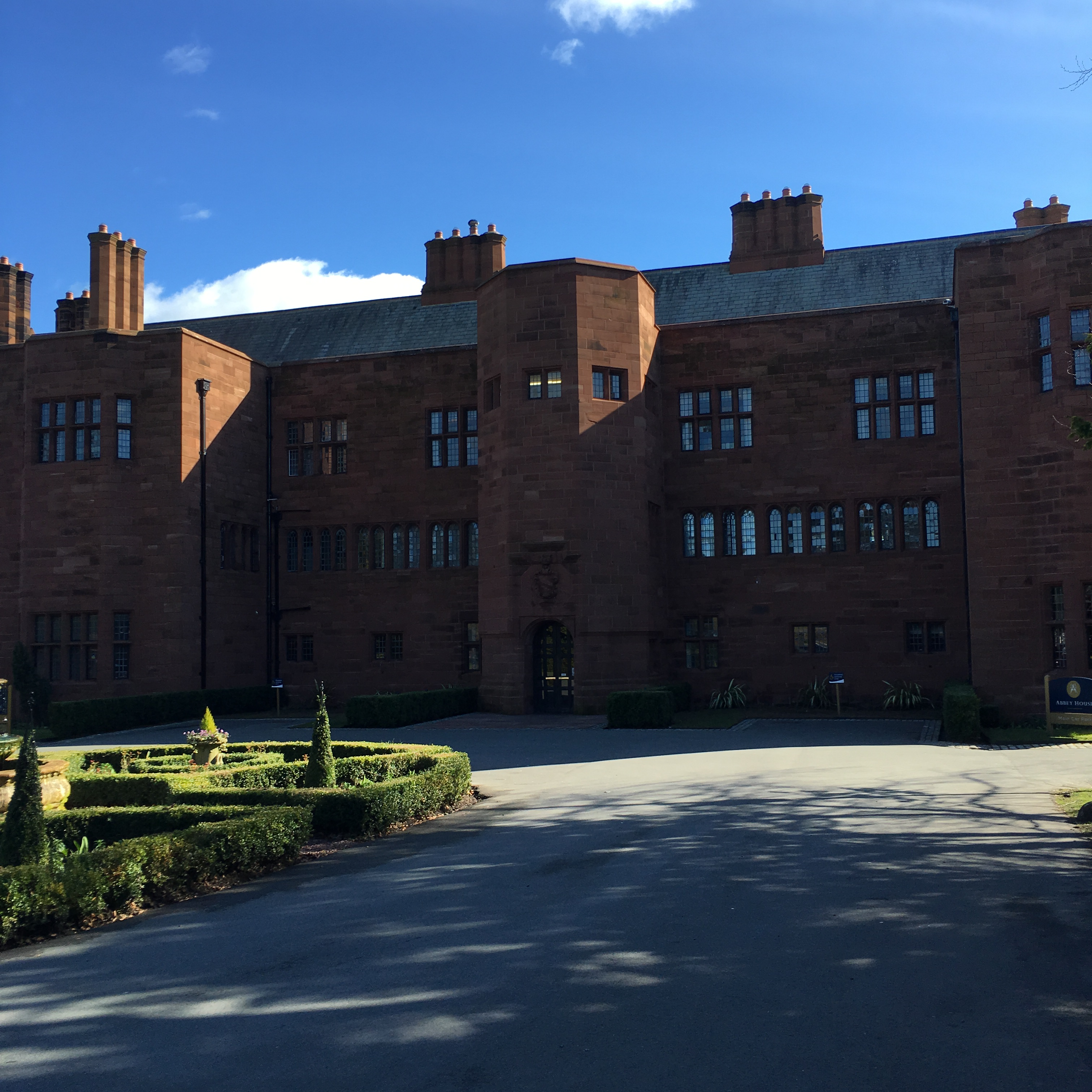
The principal facade of Abbey House photographed in March 2016

Abbey House on Abbey Road, Barrow-in-Furness, Cumbria, England is a Neo-Elizabethan H-plan mansion designed by Sir Edwin Lutyens and completed in 1914 as a guest house for Vickers Ltd and a flat for the Managing Director, Sir James McKechnie.

It takes its name from the adjacent Furness Abbey.

In its abstracted, military echo of the Tudor style, it prefigures the style of Lutyens' Castle Drogo. In 1951, having been acquired by the County Council, Abbey House was made into an old people's home, and consequently suffered considerable neglect. Abbey House has been a Grade II* Listed Building since 1949.

In 1984, it was sold by the Council and restored as a hotel. The Abbey House Hotel is now a four-star venue set in 14-acres of gardens and saw a major extension during the early 2000s. The hotel's restaurant 'Oscars' is open to public use.
