= Abbot's Wood, Cumbria =

Abbot's Wood
- 19th century painting of the Abbot's Wood estate

- Location within Cumbria
- 54°8′24″N 3°11′42″W
- Location: Cumbria, England
- OS grid reference: SD 22029 72234

History
- Built: 1857-1859
- Built for: Sir James Ramsden
- Demolished: 1961, partly

Site notes
- Architect: E. G. Paley
- Architectural styles: Gothic architecture and Tudor architecture

Listed Building – Grade II

Abbot's Wood (also Abbotswood) was a large country house and estate located to the north-northeast of Barrow-in-Furness, Cumbria, England. It was sited on elevated ground to the northeast of Furness Abbey. The house was surrounded by extensive grounds with footpaths providing fine views.

== History ==
The house was designed by the Lancaster architect E. G. Paley, and built between 1857 and 1859 for Sir James Ramsden. Ramsden was an industrialist who played a large part in running the Furness Railway, eventually becoming its managing director, and in the iron and steel and shipbuilding industry in Barrow-in-Furness. The Furness Railway contributed £2,000 (equivalent to £200,000 in 2025) towards its cost, although Brandwood et al. consider that it must have cost much more. The same authors also suggest that the house was used by the railway as a showpiece, and that clients would have been entertained there. In 1874 Paley's architectural practice drew up plans for an addition to the North Lodge on the estate, and in 1882 plans for a new morning-room for the house, which was built on its southeast corner. (Note: By 1874 Hubert Austin had joined Paley as a partner, the practice then being known as Paley and Austin.) After James Ramsden's death in 1896, the house and estate passed to his son, Frederick, who died in 1941. The house was used by the army during the World War II as can be seen by the presence of disused camp sites within the grounds on later 1950s Ordnance Survey maps, and later a convalescent home. The manor's condition subsequently deteriorated, and it was demolished using dynamite in 1961 by Barrow Corporation. Much of the manor's footings however remain visible giving a clear indication of its original scale. Some of the estate buildings were left standing, including four lodges, the home farm, and cottages, all of which had been designed by the Lancaster practice. Some internal furnishings from the manor made by Gillows of Lancaster and London were transferred to Barrow Town Hall and even the Art Institute of Chicago. The grounds of the estate are now maintained as a Country Wildlife Site by the Cumbria Wildlife Trust.

== Architecture ==
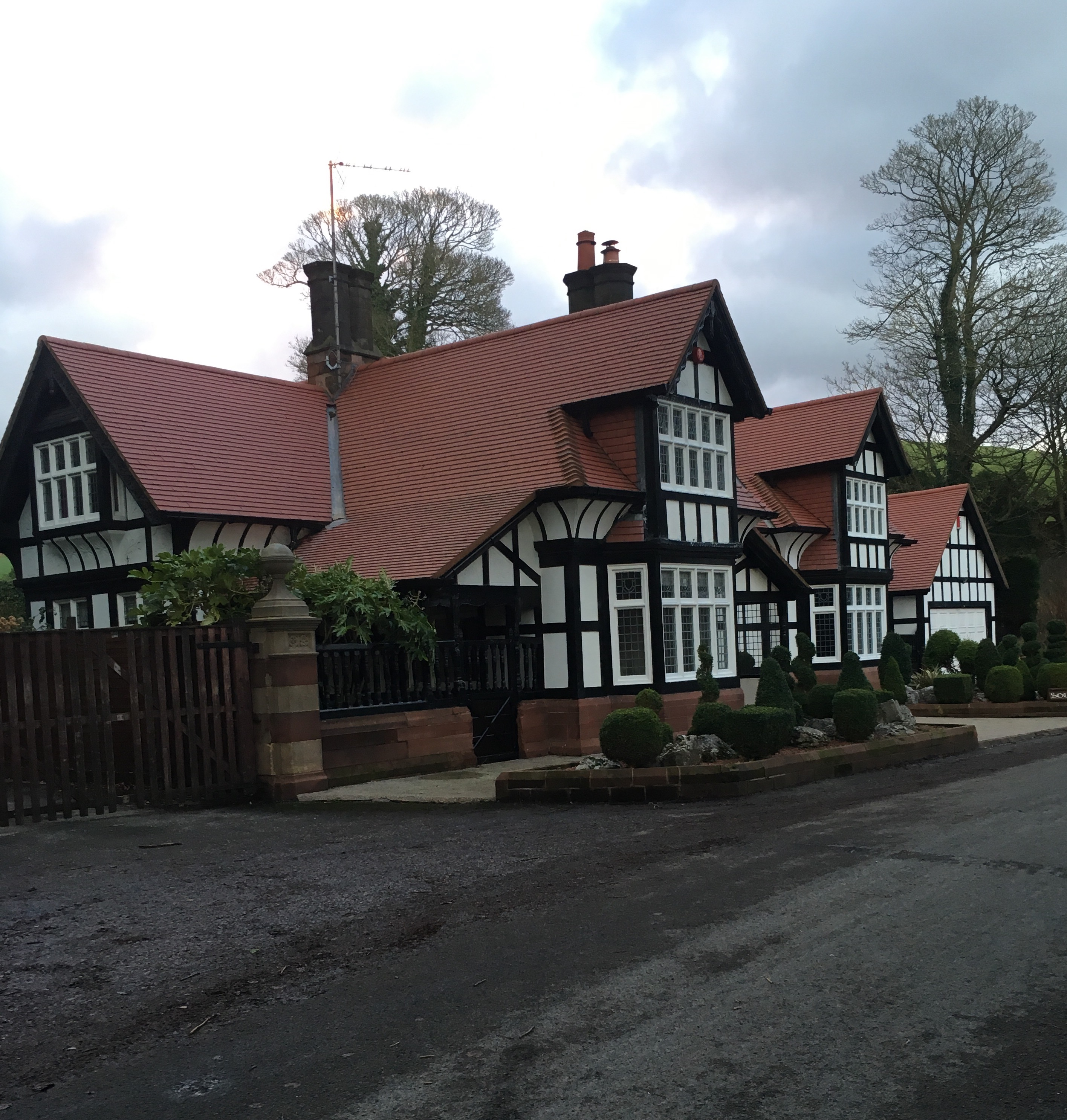
The South Lodge is one of three listed buildings of the Abbot's Wood estate that survives the original mansion

Abbot's Wood was a large complex building, incorporating elements of Gothic and Tudor architecture. There were many gables and roofs, a square tower with a taller stair turret and a particularly long conservatory. Of the surviving estate buildings, three are recorded in the National Heritage List for England as designated Grade II listed buildings; two of the lodges and the home farm. The North Lodge, with its attached gatehouse and wing walls, is constructed in sandstone, and is in Gothic Revival style. The gatehouse has two storeys, with an archway in the lower storey. The upper storey contains a niche for a statue, which is flanked by a single-light window on each side. The single-bay gabled lodge to the right has a red tiled roof, and mullioned and transomed windows. The South Lodge is half-timbered on a sandstone plinth, and has a red tiled roof. It is in two storeys, the front being gabled with a decorated bargeboard. The windows are transomed casements, and there is a four-light oriel window on the left side. The Home Farm is built in sandstone with red tiled roofs. It consists of a cottage with a single storey and an attic, a shippon and calf house, a barn, pigsties, a stable, and a cart shed. These are all set in a U-shape around a courtyard.

== See also ==
- Listed buildings in Barrow-in-Furness

== References and notes ==
=== Sources ===
- Brandwood, Geoff; Austin, Tim; Hughes, John; Price, James (2012), The Architecture of Sharpe, Paley and Austin, Swindon: English Heritage, ISBN 978-1-84802-049-8
- Hyde, Matthew; Pevsner, Nikolaus (2010) [1967], Cumbria, The Buildings of England, New Haven and London: Yale University Press, ISBN 978-0-300-12663-1
- Price, James (1998), Sharpe, Paley and Austin: A Lancaster Architectural Practice 1836–1942, Lancaster: Centre for North-West Regional Studies, ISBN 1-86220-054-8
