= Romney Cottage =

Coordinates: 54°8′4.3″N 3°13′41.1″W

Romney Cottage is an early 18th-century home located in the Ormsgill area of Barrow-in-Furness, Cumbria, England. Also known as High Cocken it is most noted as being the residence of painter George Romney, an early member of the famed Romney family. Having been born in nearby Dalton-in-Furness, Romney lived in High Cocken between the ages of 8 and 21 before relocating to Kendal and eventually London. Romney Cottage was granted Grade II listed status in 1976.
