= John Whinnerah Institute =

Building in Barrow-in-Furness, Cumbria, England

Coordinates: 54.1133°N 3.2336°W

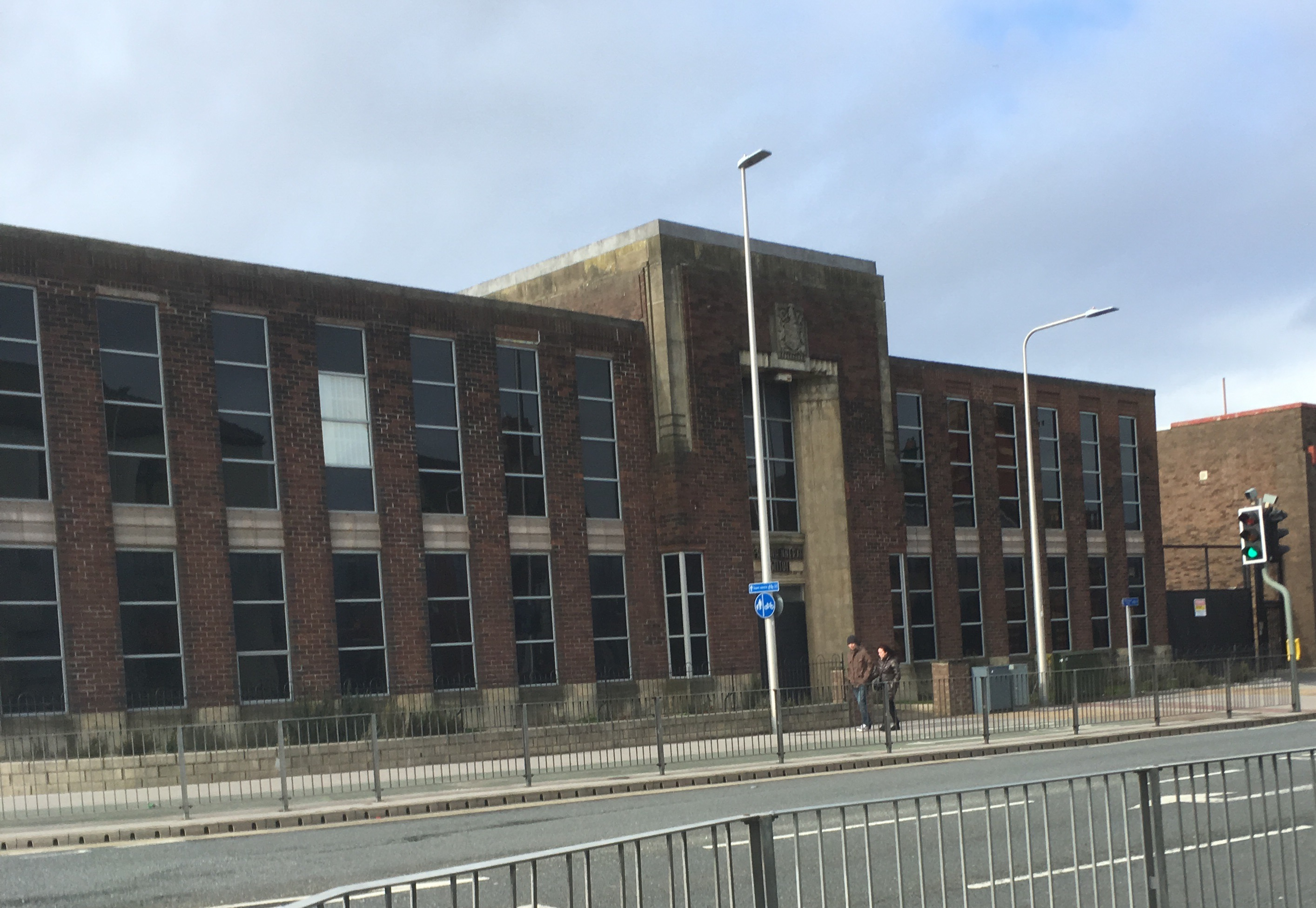
The preserved Abbey Road frontage of the John Whinnerah Institute in 2016

The John Whinnerah Institute is a Grade II listed Art Deco building and former educational establishment located on Abbey Road in Barrow-in-Furness, England. Having been constructed between 1937 and 1938 on the site of the demolished Jute Works it is the newest listed structure in the town, despite this it was drastically altered in 2004 when the entire interior was demolished to accommodate new retail units leaving only the Abbey Road and Hindpool Road facades.

The building was constructed post the Unemployment Act 1934 specifically to house the Barrow Women's Institute and Junior Instruction Centre which had been using temporary premises since founding in 1925. The building is a major success story of early 20th-century attempts to improve educational facilities for young people and women from the poorest areas of major industrial towns and cities in the UK. The John Whinnerah Institute was ultimately described by the President of the National Union of Teachers, as 'the finest Women's Institute in this country'. The building was named in honour of John Whinnerah, the Mayor of the Borough of Barrow-in-Furness between 1928-1929 and 1929-1930.

The original footprint of the John Whinnerah Institute is now occupied by a Next and Cancer Research store, which form part of Hindpool Retail Park.
