= Thorncliffe Cemetery and Crematorium =

Cemetery in Cumbria, England

Coordinates: 54.1295°N 3.2276°W

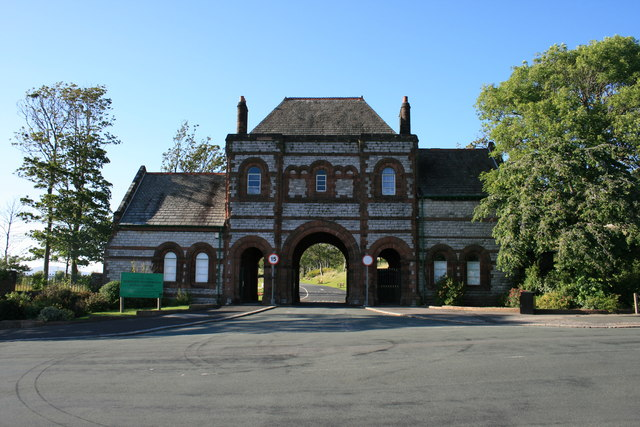
The Gate House on Devonshire Road

Thorncliffe Cemetery and Crematorium (also known as 'Barrow Cemetery/Crematorium') is a 66-acre graveyard located on Devonshire Road in the Ormsgill ward of Barrow-in-Furness, Cumbria, England.

The cemetery opened in 1872 and a crematorium was added to the site in 1962. A total of 189 identified war casualties are buried there, while over 40,000 cremations have taken place at Thorncliffe. Operated by the Westmorland and Furness Council, records of burials and cremations can be found at the Cemetery Office as well as the council's archives at Barrow Main Public Library.

The cemetery was granted Grade II status on the Register of Historic Parks and Gardens in December 2024. The cemetery's gatehouse, north lodge and Roman Catholic chapel were all completed in the early 1870s and have Grade II listed status.

== Notable burials ==
- Stephen Fitzpatrick – musician for Her's
- Sir James Ramsden – industrialist and founder of Barrow
- Samuel Wassall – recipient of the Victoria Cross

== War graves ==
The cemetery contains war graves of 109 Commonwealth service personnel (including one unidentified) of World War I and 83 (including five unidentified) of World War II, besides those of five foreign nationals (four Polish Air Force and one Netherlands Merchant Navy).
