= Dalton South =

Coordinates: 54.1480°N 3.1807°W

Dalton South is a ward of the British town Dalton-in-Furness, within the Borough of Barrow-in-Furness. With 6,200 people residing in Dalton South in 2001, increasing marginally to 6,207 at the 2011 Census.
