= Dalton North =

Coordinates: 54.1815°N 3.1875°W

Dalton North is a ward of the British town Dalton-in-Furness, within the Borough of Barrow-in-Furness. With 6,599 people residing in Dalton North in 2001, falling to 6135 at the 2011 Census.
