= Ormsgill =

Settlement in Cumbria, England

Coordinates: 54.133°N 3.233°W

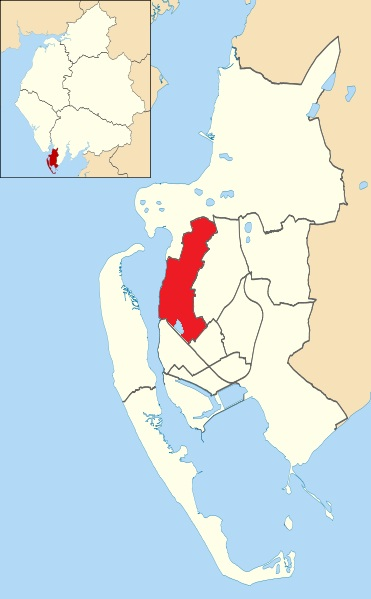
- Ormsgill shown within Barrow-in-Furness
- Population: 6,033 (2011.Ward)
- Unitary authority: Westmorland and Furness
- Ceremonial county: Cumbria
- Region: North West
- Country: England
- Sovereign state: United Kingdom
- Post town: BARROW-IN-FURNESS
- Postcode district: LA
- Dialling code: 01229
- Police: Cumbria
- Fire: Cumbria
- Ambulance: North West
- UK Parliament: Barrow and Furness

Ormsgill is an area, current Town Council ward and former district-level ward of Barrow-in-Furness, Cumbria, England. It is bordered by Hindpool, Parkside, Hawcoat, Roanhead and Walney Channel. The population of the ward in 2001 stood at 5,961 (2,883 male and 3,078 female), increasing to 6,033 at the 2011 Census. Almost three quarters of Ormsgill is greenspace, with the majority of residents living in the densely populated south-east corridor. The western part of the ward is predominantly industrial and includes a large Kimberly-Clark plant and numerous other industrial estates which provide a base for companies including Blyth, BT, Gyrodata, McBride and Oil States International.

Whilst still an electoral ward for Barrow Town Council, the ward was combined at a district/ local authority level with Parkside ward in April 2023 to form Ormsgill and Parkside following the formation of the new Westmorland and Furness Local Authority.

Ormsgill is one of the longest settled areas of what is now Barrow. It is home to the town's oldest continuously inhabited building; Ormsgill Farm House dated 1605. The building is Grade II* listed. Other sites of interest in the ward include High Cocken, former residence of George Romney, and Thorncliffe Cemetery and Crematorium, the largest graveyard in the borough.

== 2001 demographics ==
Vital statistics	Ormsgill	Barrow-in-Furness	England
Religious individuals	78.57%	81.61%	77.71%
Non-religious individuals	12.41%	10.79%	14.59%
Religion withheld	8.97%	7.59%	7.69%
Individuals in fairly good to good health	85.69%	86.75%	90.97%
Individuals in bad health	14.31%	13.25%	9.03%
People aged 16–74 who are economically active	60.40%	60.84%	66.87%
People aged 16–74 who aren't economically active	39.60%	39.16%	33.13%
People aged 16–74 with no qualifications	37.19%	32.82%	28.85%
