= Nan Tait Centre =

Protected building in Barrow-in-Furness, Cumbria, England

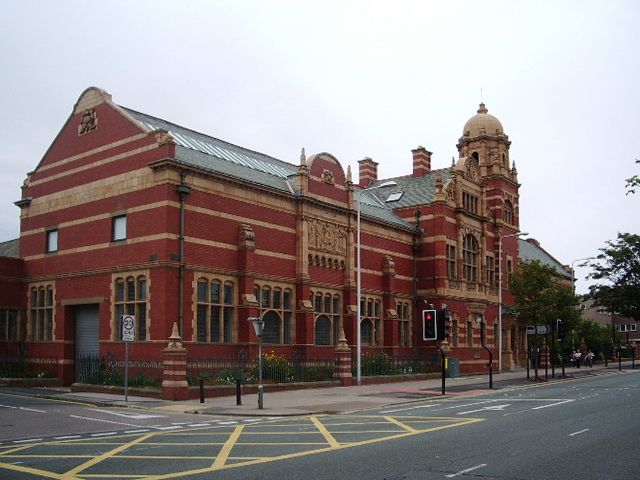
- The Nan Tait Centre in July 2007
- Interactive map of the Nan Tait Centre area

General information
- Location: Barrow-in-Furness, England, United Kingdom
- Coordinates: 54.115408°N 3.229696°W
- Current tenants: Various
- Construction started: 1900
- Completed: 1903
- Owner: Westmorland and Furness Council

Design and construction
- Architects: Woodhouse and Willoughby
- Main contractor: W Gradwell and Co.

The Nan Tait Centre is a Grade II listed building located at Abbey Road in the Hindpool area of Barrow-in-Furness, Cumbria, England.

Designed by architects Woodhouse and Willoughby it was built for the Barrow Corporation as the town's new Technical School. The foundation stone was laid on 26 May 1900 and the school was officially opened on 25 August 1903. The front of the building was designed by Austin and Paley (plans in Barrow Archive centre). In the Second World War, the Technical School narrowly escaped destruction during the Barrow Blitz, although its close neighbour Christ Church was almost completely destroyed in April 1941.

In 1970 the technical school was replaced by Thorncliffe School in Hawcoat. The result was neglected maintenance and the building fell into a near-dilapidated state. The building was ultimately redeveloped in the early 2000s at a cost of £4 million and was named in honour of Agnes "Nan" Tait (Mayor of the Borough of Barrow-in-Furness from 1959 to 1960). The Nan Tait Centre is now multifunctional serving as a cultural, exhibition and arts centre as well as a general office building. The Barracudas carnival band, Dare Dance, Capita Symonds, Barrow Borough Sports Council and Barrow Register Office are all tenants of the centre.

In 2026 Westmorland and Furness Council intends to dispose of the building to charities through a community asset transfer.

== Architecture ==
The majority of the Nan Tait Centre is two storey, with the exception of the centrally located domed four-storey tower. The building is red brick and terracotta with a slate roof and is noted for its two large east-facing engravings; one panel depicts six robed females underneath the Latin motto Ars Longa Vita Brevis, whilst the other bears the motto Labor omnia vincit as well as technology-related scenes. Two large gable ends face onto Bath Street and the centre's car park.

== See also ==
- Listed buildings in Barrow-in-Furness
