= Central Barrow =

Settlement in Cumbria, England

Coordinates: 54.11°N 3.22°W

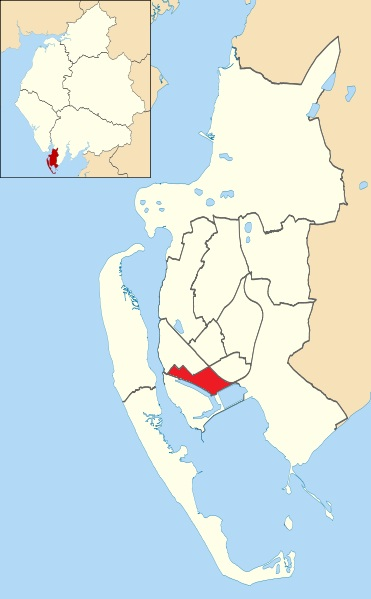
- Central Barrow shown within Barrow-in-Furness
- Population: 4,583 (2011)
- Unitary authority: Westmorland and Furness
- Ceremonial county: Cumbria
- Region: North West
- Country: England
- Sovereign state: United Kingdom
- Post town: BARROW-IN-FURNESS
- Postcode district: LA
- Dialling code: 01229
- Police: Cumbria
- Fire: Cumbria
- Ambulance: North West
- UK Parliament: Barrow and Furness

Central Barrow refers both to the town centre of Barrow-in-Furness, Cumbria, England and to the Town Council electoral ward that roughly covers the eastern part of that town centre. In 2001 5,584 (ranking 5th out of 13) lived in the Central ward. The population density was 55.96 per hectare, which was well above the local average of 9.24, and England average, 3.77. The population of Central ward had reduced to 4,583 at the 2011 Census.

Central Barrow is amongst the 3% most deprived areas in the country and households have an average weekly income around £100 lower than the region's average, however the area being the central business district of the town is also home to many of Barrow's retail outlets, as well as a large amount of offices, restaurants and governmental buildings. Part of the £200 million Waterfront Barrow-in-Furness project is being constructed in the southern part of Central Barrow (including the new Marina Village).

Whilst still an electoral ward for Barrow Town Council, the ward was combined at a district/ local authority level with Barrow Island and Hindpool wards in April 2023 following formation of the new Westmorland and Furness Local Authority and be named 'Old Barrow'.

In a bid to tackle issues related with Central Barrow such as deprivation, unemployment and poor housing quality/choice, Barrow Borough Council is currently preparing the 'Central Barrow Masterplan' which will set out guidelines for the redevelopment of Central Barrow. The plan will also put forward proposals for a bus station/transport interchange to replace the existing shelters outside of the town hall. It is not yet known when the plan will be published or what exactly it will include.

== Demographics ==
Vital statistics	Central Barrow	Barrow-in-Furness	England
Religious individuals	75.72%	81.61%	77.71%
Non-religious individuals	15.52%	10.79%	14.59%
Religion withheld	9.08%	7.59%	7.69%
Individuals in fairly good to good health	81.20%	86.75%	90.97%
Individuals in bad health	18.80%	13.25%	9.03%
People aged 16–74 who are economically active	54.88%	60.84%	66.87%
People aged 16–74 who aren't economically active	45.12%	39.16%	33.13%
People aged 16–74 with no qualifications	41.34%	32.82%	28.85%

== See also ==
- Barrow-in-Furness Town Hall
- Barrow Borough Council
- Hindpool Retail Parks
