= Timeline of Barrow-in-Furness =

The following is a timeline of the history of Barrow-in-Furness, England, United Kingdom.

== Prior to 19th century ==
- Neolithic period – Earliest known habitation within present-day Barrow
- 9th century – Viking settlement of the Furness peninsula
- 1086 – The Doomesday Book records settlements in Hietun, Rosse and Hougenai (now Hawcoat, Roose and Walney)
- 1123 – Furness Abbey is established
- 1190 – Barrow Island from which Barrow takes its name is first recorded as being named Barrai
- 1327 – The current Piel Castle is completed
- 1537 – Furness Abbey is destroyed in the English Reformation

== 19th century ==
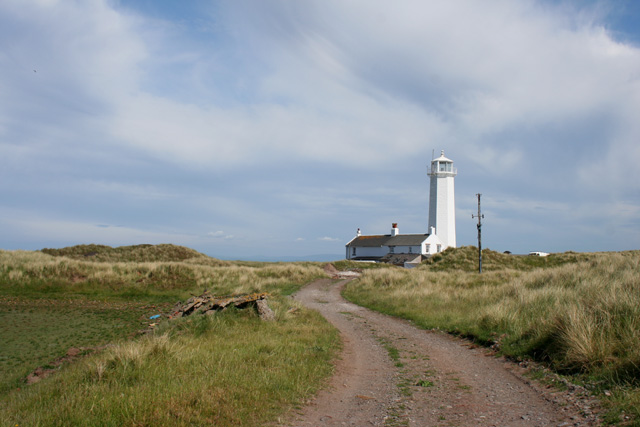
Walney Lighthouse superseded the port and new town of Barrow upon completion in 1804

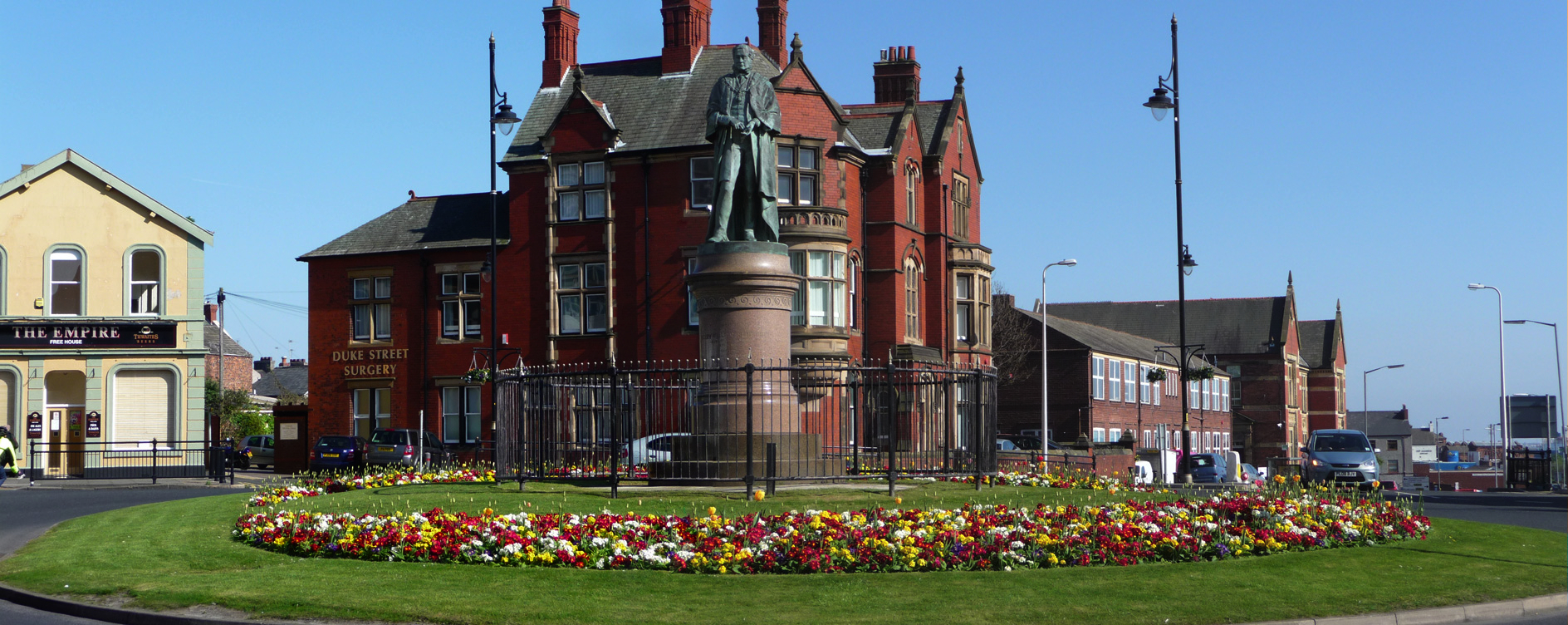
Statue of Henry Schneider, a founder of the new town of Barrow

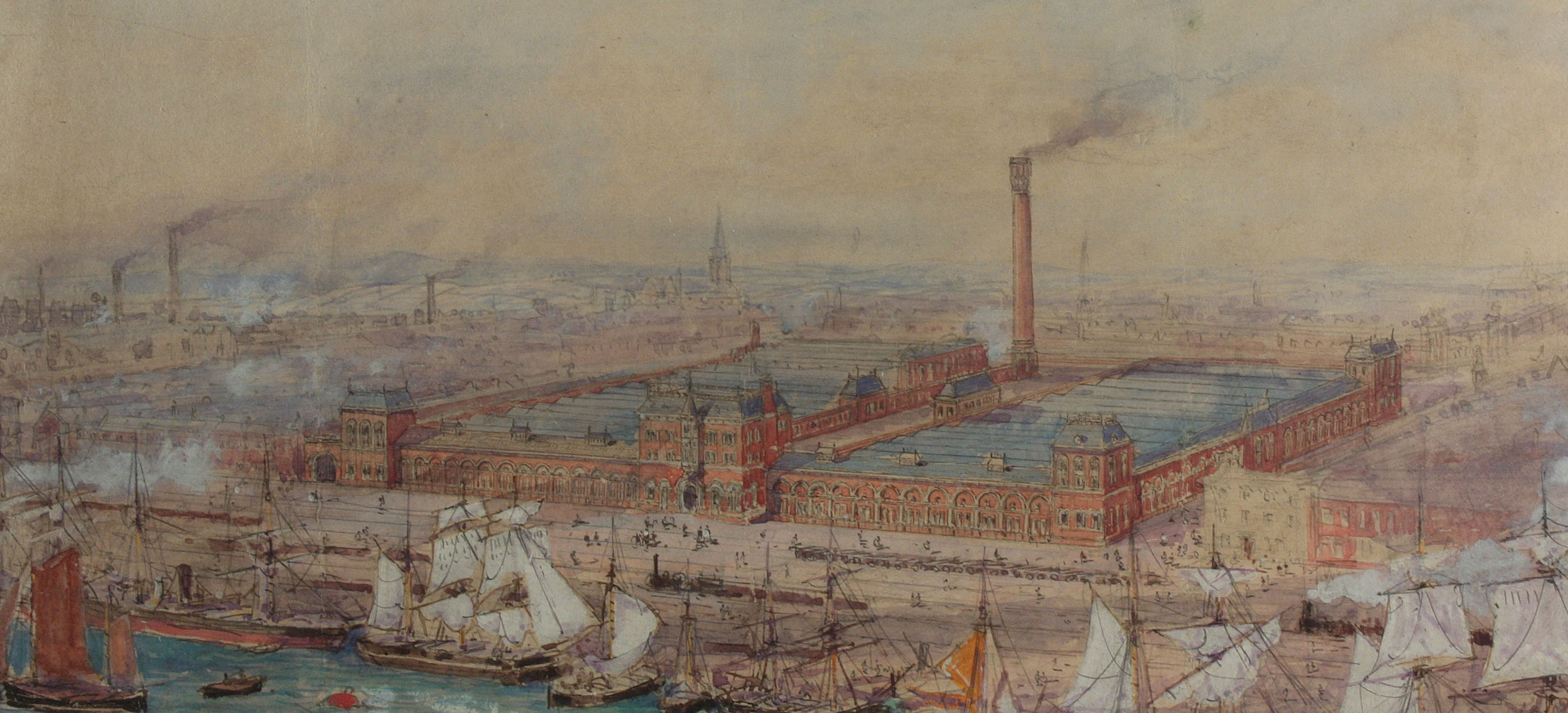
The Barrow Jute Works opened in 1870 and employed upwards of 2,000 women

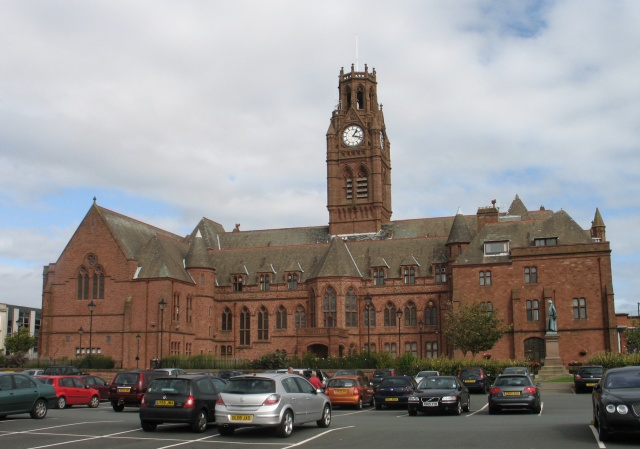
Barrow Town Hall was completed in 1887

- 1801 – Population of village of Barrow stood at 1,958 during 1801 UK Census
- 1804 – Walney Lighthouse is completed
- 1839 – Henry Schneider arrives to exploit local iron ore
- 1846
  - Furness Railway is opened
  - Roa Island causeway is completed
- 1847 – Population: 325.
- 1850 – Expansive haematite deposits are discovered in the area
- 1852 – Jane Roper is the first ship to be built in Barrow
- 1858 – St. Mary of Furness Roman Catholic Church is built
- 1859 – Schneider Hannay & Co is founded.
- 1860 – Barrow Co-operative Society is established
- 1861 – St. George's Church is built
- 1863 – Construction begins on Barrow's dock system
- 1865
  - A magnitude 3.0 earthquake causes extensive damage to the Rampside area
  - Schneider Hannay & Co becomes the Barrow Hematite Steel Company.
- 1867
  - Barrow is granted municipal borough status
  - Sir James Ramsden becomes first mayor of Barrow
  - Devonshire Dock opens.
  - Cases' Brewery opens
- 1869 – St. James' Church is built
- 1870 – Barrow Jute Works are completed
- 1871
  - The Barrow Shipbuilding Company is established
  - Barrow Corn Mills are built
- 1872 – Furness Golf Club is founded
- 1873 – Duke of Devonshire is the first steamship to be built in Barrow
- 1875
  - Barrow Football Club, the forerunner of Barrow Raiders is established
  - Devonshire Buildings are built
- 1876 – Barrow's steelworks become the world's largest
- 1877 – St. James' Church installs a ring of 8 bells – first rung on St James' day (25th July)
- 1879 – Ramsden Dock completed.
- 1881
  - The autonomous Barrow-in-Furness Borough Police force is established
  - SS City of Rome is launched, briefly the world's largest liner
- 1882 – Barrow Central railway station is opened
- 1884 – Michaelson Road Bridge is opened
- 1885
  - The Barrow and Furness parliament constituency is established
  - Barrow-in-Furness Tramways Company commences operation.
- 1886 – Ottoman submarine Abdül Hamid is launched in Barrow and becomes the first submarine to fire a live torpedo underwater
- 1887
  - Barrow Town Hall is opened by Spencer Cavendish, 8th Duke of Devonshire
  - North Lonsdale Hospital is opened
- 1888 – Town becomes a county borough.
- 1889 – Co-operative Building built.
- 1891 – Population: 51,712.
- 1896 – Death of Sir James Ramsden mechanical engineer, industrialist, and first mayor of Barrow.
- 1897 – The Barrow Shipbuilding Company becomes Vickers Shipbuilding and Engineering after being purchased by Vickers Limited
- 1898 – The North-Western Daily Mail first begins publishing
- 1899 – Barrow-in-Furness power station commissioned.

== 20th century ==
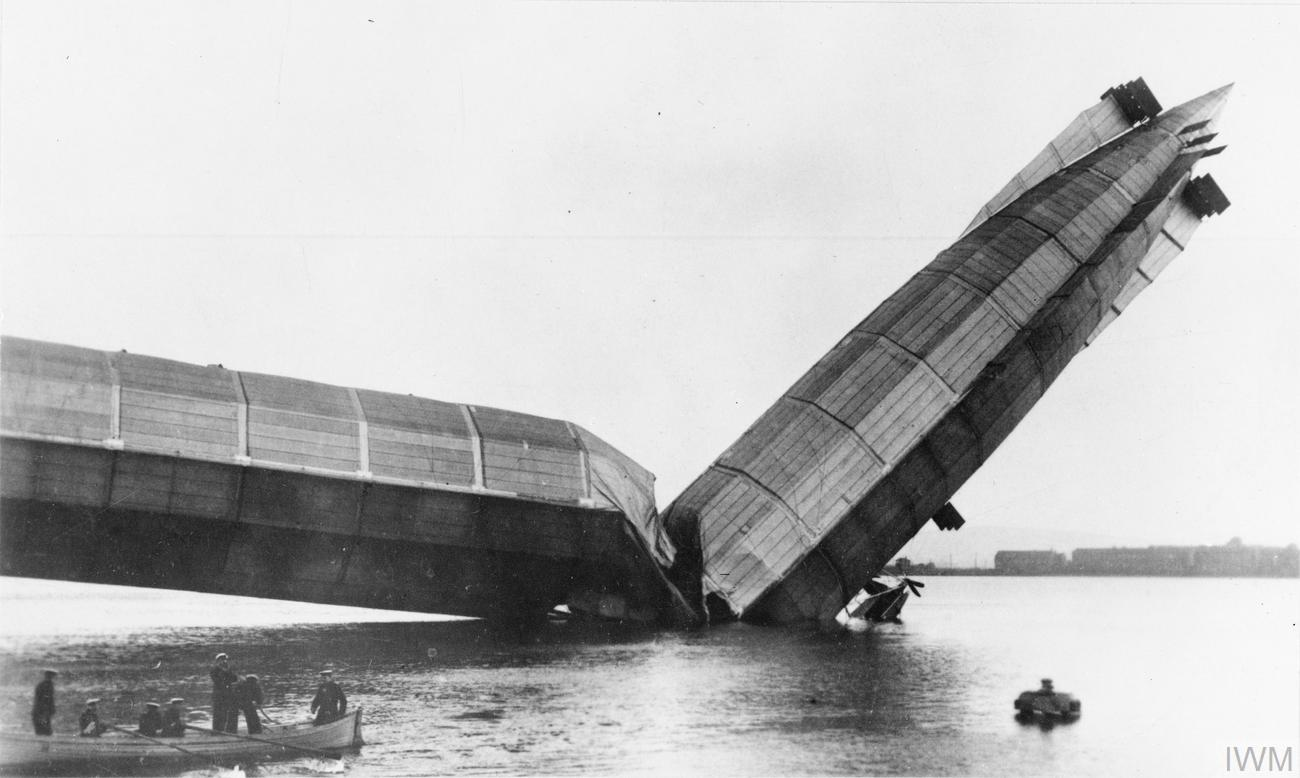
The Mayfly airship disaster in Cavendish Dock

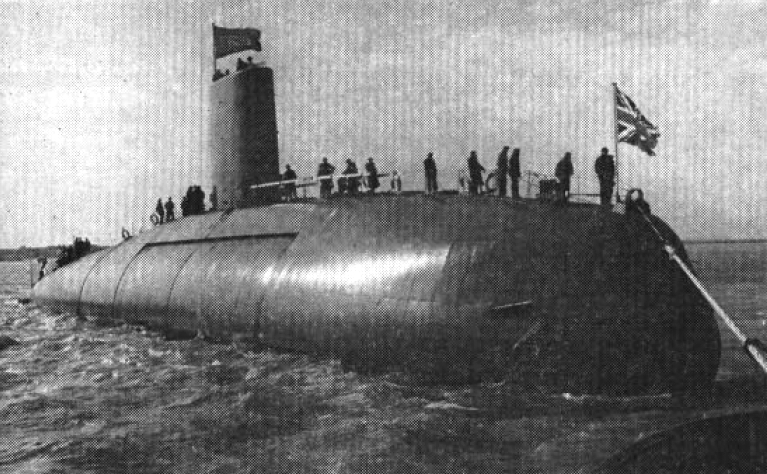
The launch of HMS Dreadnought in 1960; the UK's first nuclear powered submarine

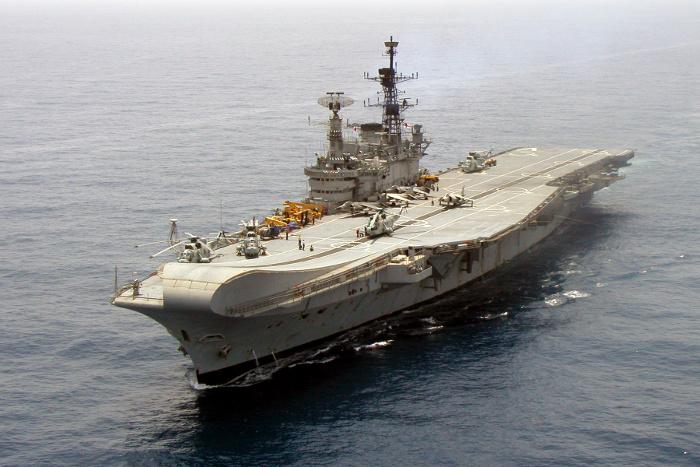
INS Viraat of the Indian Navy was launched as the Royal Navy's HMS Hermes in 1953

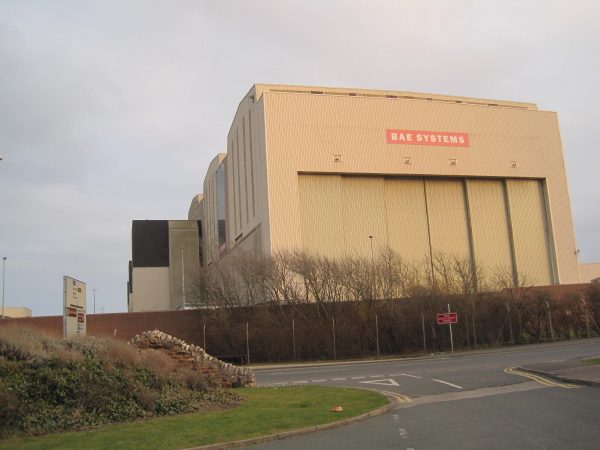
Devonshire Dock Hall was completed in 1986 and included the world's largest shiplift

- 1900 – Japanese battleship Mikasa is launched
- 1901
  - Population of Barrow stood at 67,354 during 1901 UK Census
  - Barrow A.F.C. is established
  - The Vickerstown estate is completed
- 1902 – Abbey Road Synagogue is built
- 1903 – The Barrow Technical School is established
- 1904 – Hotel Majestic built.
- 1908
  - Jubilee Bridge is opened.
  - Barrow Park created.
- 1909
  - Brazilian battleship São Paulo and HMS Vanguard are launched
- 1911 – The Mayfly airship disaster
- 1912
  - Barrow Central Fire Station is opened
  - Japanese battleship Kongō is launched
- 1914
  - The outbreak of World War I in which 616 Barrovian men die
  - Abbey House is built
  - Explosion occurs on Tanker SS Vedra which runs aground off Walney killing 36
- 1919 – Barrow Park Cenotaph is built
- 1922
  - Barrow Main Public Library is opened
  - Sporadic marches and violence occur over shipyard overtime disputes
- 1929 – Buccleuch Street Electricity Plant opens
- 1931 – RMS Strathaird is launched
- 1932 – Barrow-in-Furness Tramways Company ceases operation
- 1938 – The John Whinnerah Institute is established
- 1939
  - Outbreak of World War II in which 268 Barrovian men die
  - HMS Illustrious is launched
- 1940
  - HMS Indomitable is launched by Winston Churchill
  - HMS Upholder the most successful British submarine of the war is launched
  - Luftwaffe aerial bombardment of Barrow during World War II begins
- 1941
  - Barrow/Walney Island Airport is opened as a Royal Air Force base
  - The majority of the Barrow Blitz takes place killing 83 civilians
- 1943 – HMS Colossus is launched
- 1944 – The role of Bishop of Barrow-in-Furness is placed in abeyance
- 1945
  - HMAS Melbourne is launched
  - RMS Empress of Russia is gutted by fire in Buccleuch Dock
- 1947 – Barrow Hematite Steel Company Limited becomes Barrow Ironworks Limited
- 1951 – Barrow's population peaks at 76,619 during the 1951 UK Census
- 1953 – HMS Hermes the largest naval vessel built in Barrow is launched
- 1954 – The coal-fired Roosecote Power Station opens
- 1955 – First and to date only time Barrow have won rugby league's Challenge Cup
- 1959 – SS Oriana is launched
- 1960 – Queen Elizabeth II launches HMS Dreadnought the UK's first nuclear powered submarine
- 1963 – Iron ore deposits run out and ironworks cease operation
- 1965 – Queen Elizabeth II launches oil tanker British Admiral, the first UK vessel to exceed 100,000 tonnes
- 1967 – Craven House built.
- 1971 – HMS Swiftsure is launched
- 1974
  - The Borough of Barrow-in-Furness is formed
  - Barrow is annexed from Lancashire to become part of the modern county of Cumbria
- 1977 – HMS Invincible is launched
- 1980 – Barrow's last remaining steelworks close down
- 1981 – HMS Trafalgar is launched
- 1984 – Furness General Hospital is opened
- 1985 – Rampside Gas Terminal first collects gas from the Irish Sea
- 1986 – Devonshire Dock Hall is completed
- 1990 – Barrow A.F.C. win the FA Trophy
- 1992
  - Commercial operations cease at Barrow/Walney Island Airport
  - HMS Vanguard is launched
  - Dalton bypass opens
- 1994 – South Lakes Wild Animal Park opens
- 1995 – GEC buys Barrow's shipyard
- 1997 – Dock Museum opens
- 1998
  - Queen Elizabeth II names HMS Ocean after being fitted out in Barrow
- 1999 – GEC is merged with BAE Systems and the shipyard becomes part of BAE Systems Marine

== 21st century ==
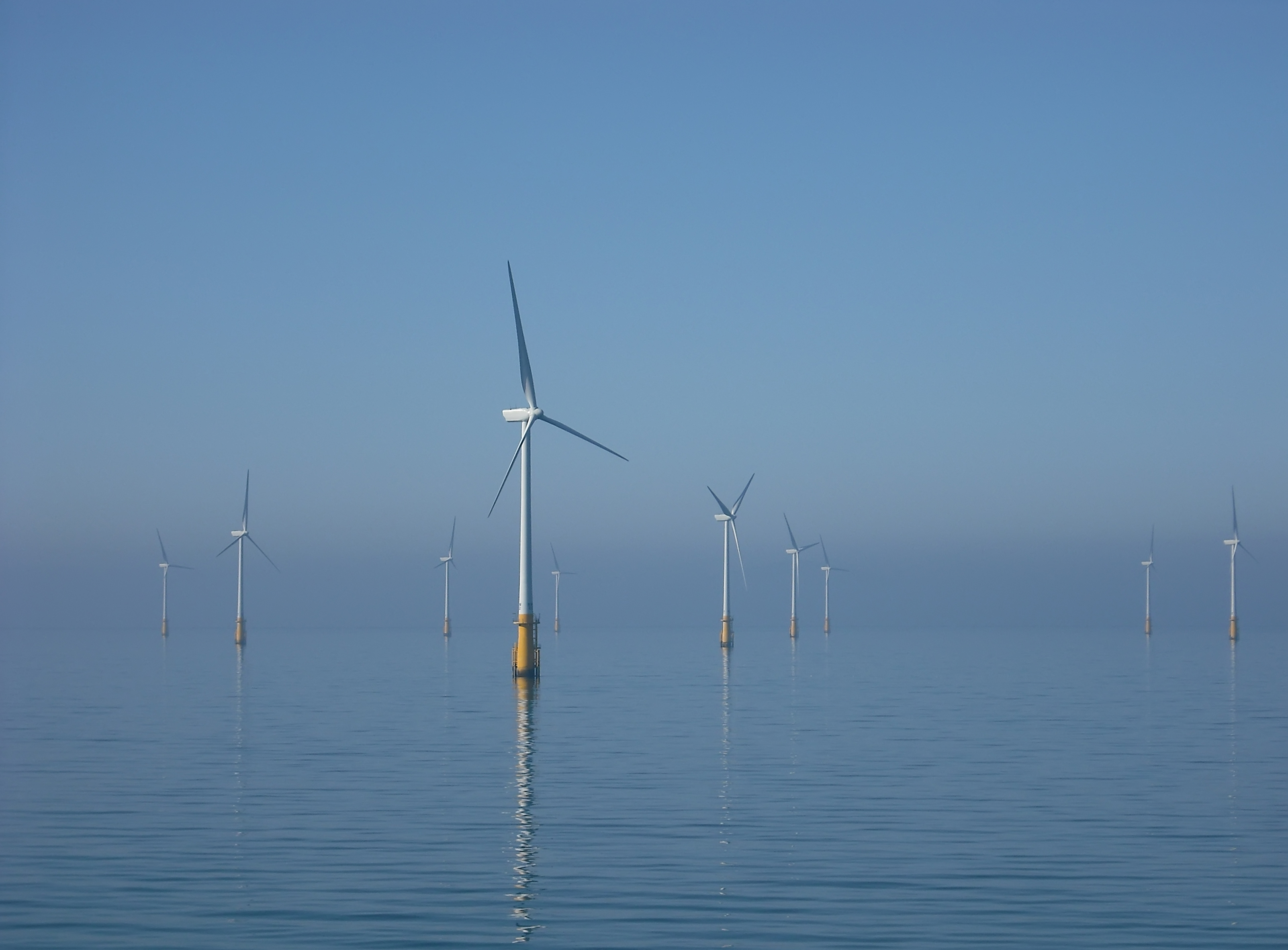
Barrow Offshore Wind Farm, the first of many such facilities to be built off the town's coast

- 2000 – RFA Wave Knight is launched
- 2001
  - Population of Barrow stood at 71,979 during 2001 UK Census
  - HMS Albion and HMS Bulwark are launched
- 2002 – A major outbreak of legionellosis occurs
- 2006
  - Local council becomes first public body charged with manslaughter
  - Barrow Offshore Wind Farm is completed
- 2007 – HMS Astute is launched
- 2010
  - Construction of 'The Waterfront' begins
  - Barrow A.F.C. win the FA Trophy
- 2011 – Furness General Hospital scandal comes to light
- 2014 – The 8 bells at St James' Church are restored after being unsafe to ring and silent for 15 years.
- 2016 – UK Government approves construction of the Dreadnought-class submarines in Barrow
- 2021 – AUKUS partnership is established with a 2023 commitment to designing and constructing a new class of submarine in Barrow
- 2024 – Borough of Barrow-in-Furness is abolished upon merging of the district with Eden and South Lakeland to for Westmorland and Furness unitary authority, whilst Barrow Town Council is established
- 2025 – King Charles III grants royal patronage to the Port of Barrow and a mark of royal favour to the town itself.

== See also ==
- History of Cumbria
- Listed buildings in Barrow-in-Furness
- List of ships and submarines built in Barrow-in-Furness
- List of people from Barrow-in-Furness
