= Scotch Buildings =

Coordinates: 54.117375°N 3.237251°W

The Scotch Buildings was a large complex of tenement housing located off Duke Street in Barrow-in-Furness, then Lancashire, United Kingdom. The build was commissioned by the Barrow Hematite Steel Company and constructed somewhat hastily by Scottish firm Smith and Caird between 1871 and 1872 to address a chronic housing shortage in the rapidly expanding town. The complex took on a triangular form with a centrally located courtyard. The four storey building was constructed from the iconic Hawcoat sandstone and was bound by Blake Street, Duke Street and Walney Road. Two shops and a working men's club were sited on the three corners of the building. It contained some 260 flats housing over 1,000 residents. The Scotch Buildings were ultimately demolished in 1956, the entire site is now shared by a Travis Perkins outlet and the Former Agrilek Engineering company office, now Saint Mary's Hospice Furniture Warehouse.

== See also ==
- Devonshire Buildings - Grade II* tenement buildings on Barrow Island also constructed by Smith & Caird
