= Schneider Square =

Coordinates: 54.110°N 3.226°W

Schneider Square is a square located at the intersection of Duke Street, Dalton Road, Michaelson Road, Burlington Street and Fisher's Yard in Barrow-in-Furness, Cumbria, England. Schneider Square has changed little since its construction in the mid-19th century and now lies within a conservation area. Named after Henry Schneider who played a major role in the development of Barrow, there is a statue commemorating the industrialist in the centre of the square. Located on, or immediately adjacent to Schneider Square are Barrow Town Hall, Craven House, former Barrow Higher Grade School, Hotel Majestic, Burlington House and Duke Street Surgery.

== See also ==
- Ramsden Square
- St. George's Square
