= Ramsden Square =

Square in Barrow-in-Furness, Cumbria, England

Coordinates: 54.114°N 3.231°W

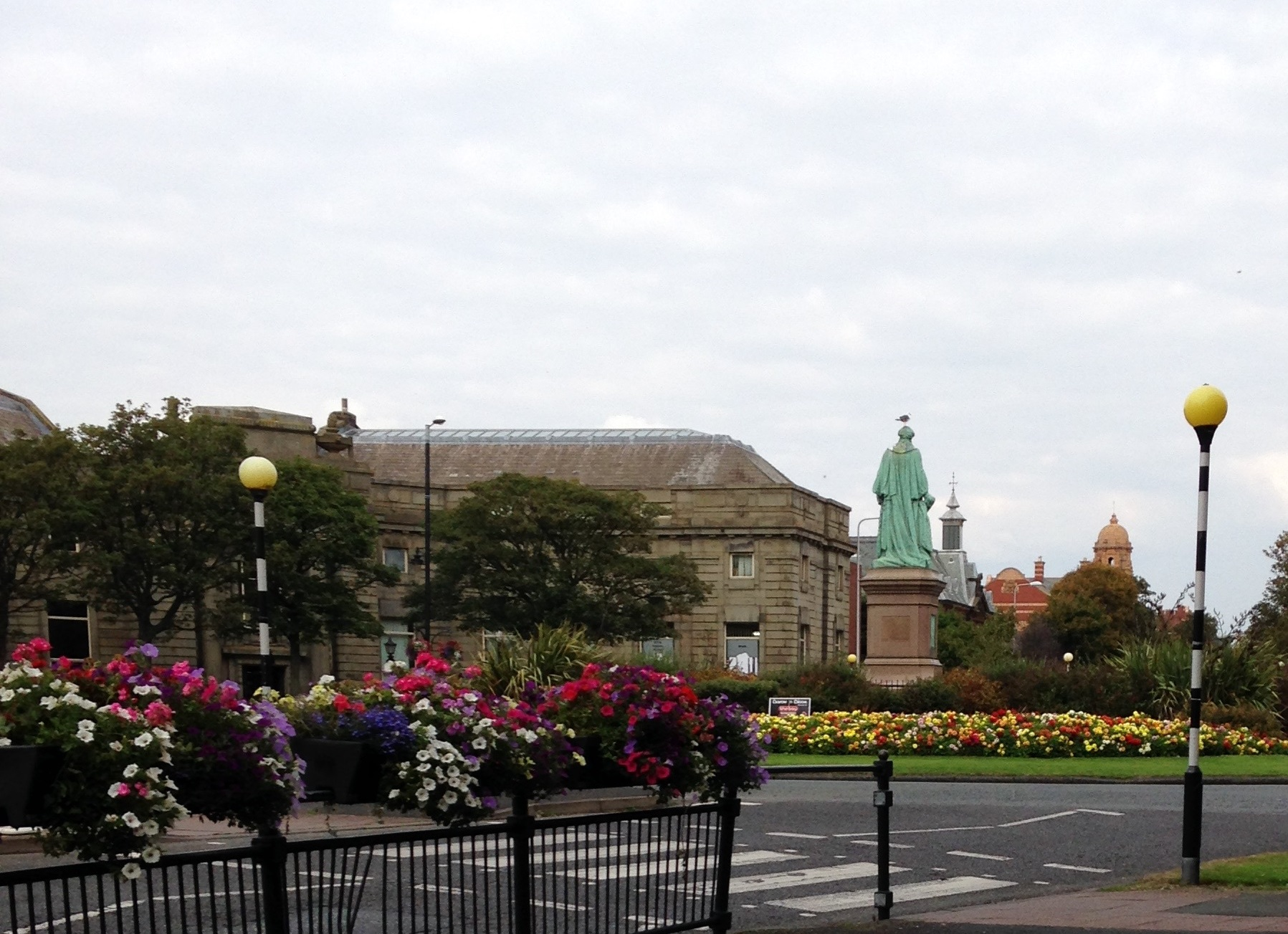
Ramsden Square looking north up Abbey Road in 2014.

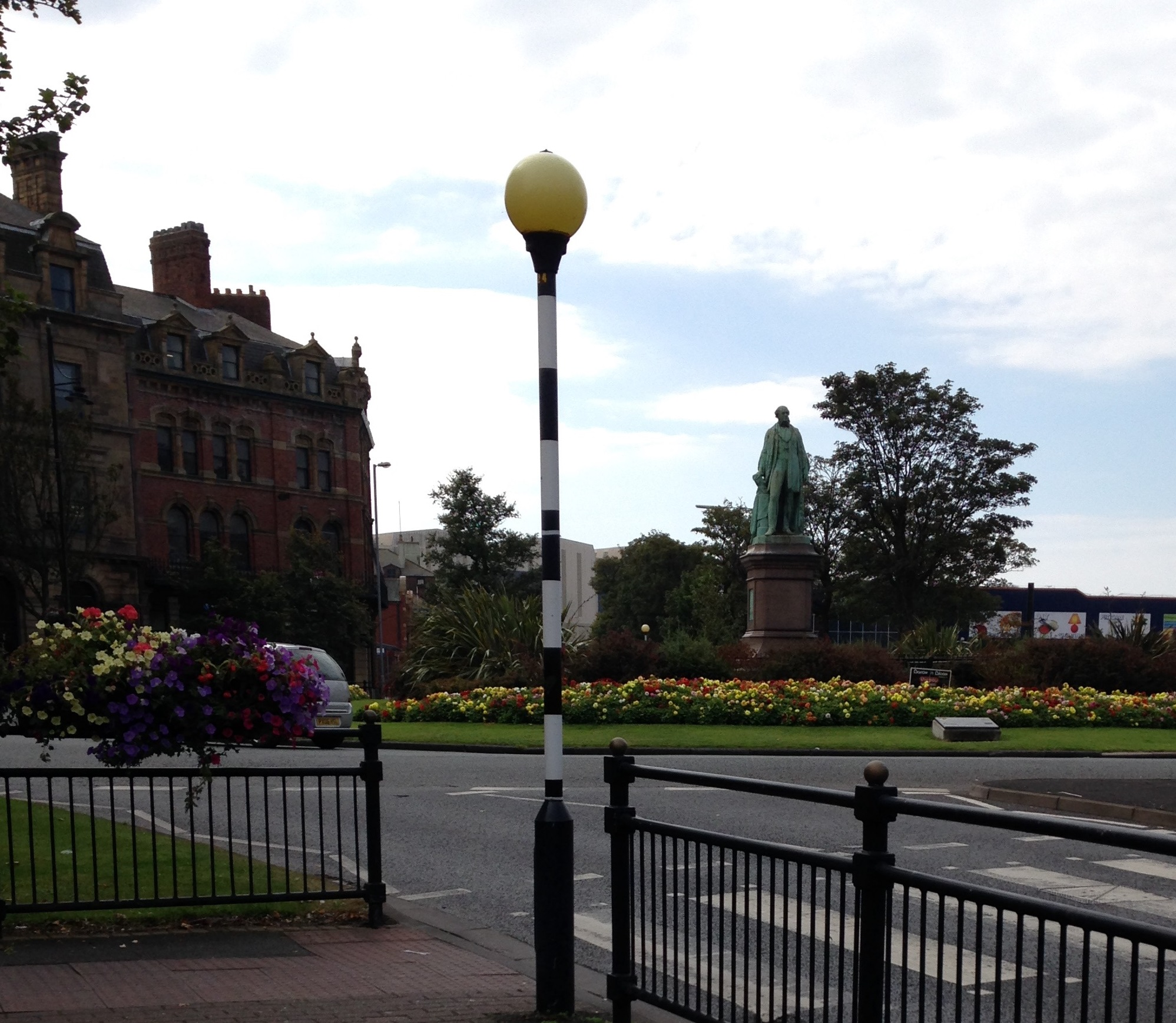
Ramsden Square looking south towards Barrow's shipyard in 2014.

Ramsden Square is a square and roundabout located at the intersection of Abbey Road and Duke Street in Barrow-in-Furness, Cumbria, England. It marks the boundary of the Central and Hindpool wards. Ramsden Square was first laid out in the 1840s to act as a focal point of Sir James Ramsden's master plan for the new town of Barrow, separating its burgeoning industries and commercial core. The centerpiece of the square is a statue of Ramsden himself while it is framed by a number of historic buildings including Barrow Central Library, the National Westminster Bank Building and formerly the Barrow Jute Works.

== See also ==
- Schneider Square
- St. George's Square
