= Barrow-in-Furness Strand railway station =

Disused railway station in Cumbria, England

Coordinates: 54.1077°N 3.2217°W

Barrow-in-Furness (Strand)
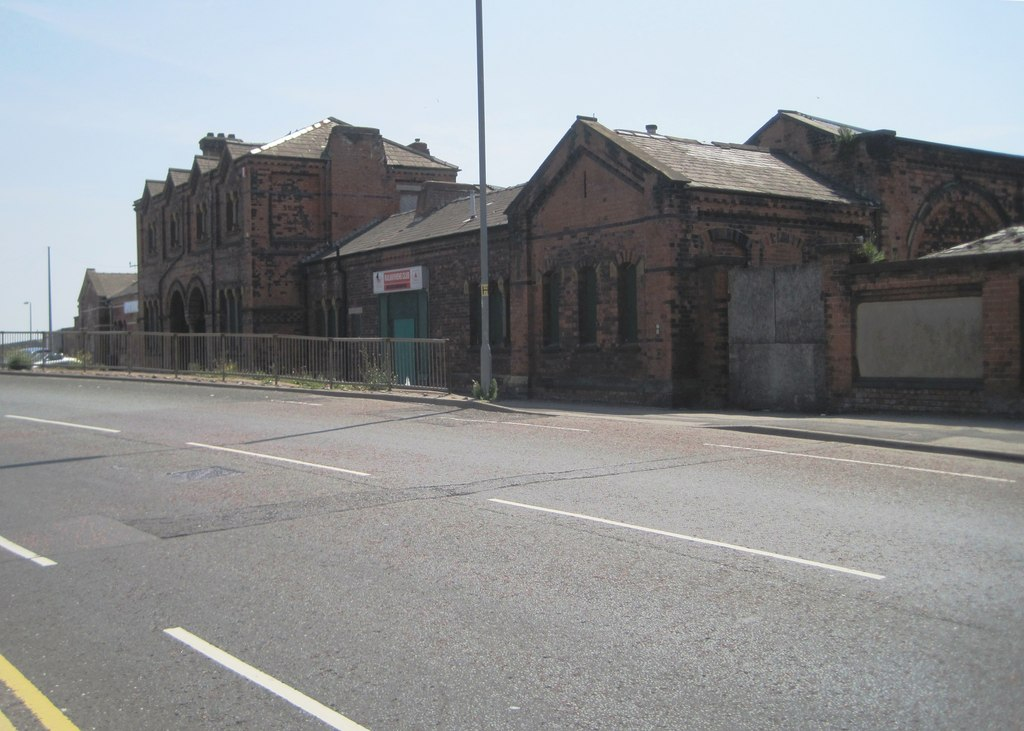
- The former station building in 2013

General information
- Location: Barrow in Furness, Westmorland and Furness; England

Other information
- Status: Disused

History
- Original company: Furness Railway
- Pre-grouping: Furness Railway

Key dates
- 1863: Opened
- 1882: Closed
Location

Barrow-in-Furness Strand railway station was the first permanent railway terminus to be built in Barrow-in-Furness, England. Located on the Strand at St. George's Square close to the town's docks its functioning life was short, however the building itself continued to be used as the headquarters of the Furness Railway for a number of years. The station opened in 1863 having replaced a wooden structure which was erected in 1846 at adjacent Rabbit Hill. The station at St. George's square ceased commercial operations in 1882 upon the completion of a new loop line and much larger station at Abbey Road. Barrow-in-Furness Central railway station, later simply renamed Barrow-in-Furness railway station has been the town's primary station ever since.

The railway station building is Grade II listed and spent most of its later life as a working men's club.

In April 2026 the Victorian Society included the building in their annual top 10 endangered buildings list for England and Wales.

== See also ==
- Listed buildings in Barrow-in-Furness

Preceding station	Historical railways	Following station
Roose	Furness Railway	Terminus
