= The Forum, Barrow-in-Furness =

Coordinates: 54°06′44″N 3°13′40″W

The Forum
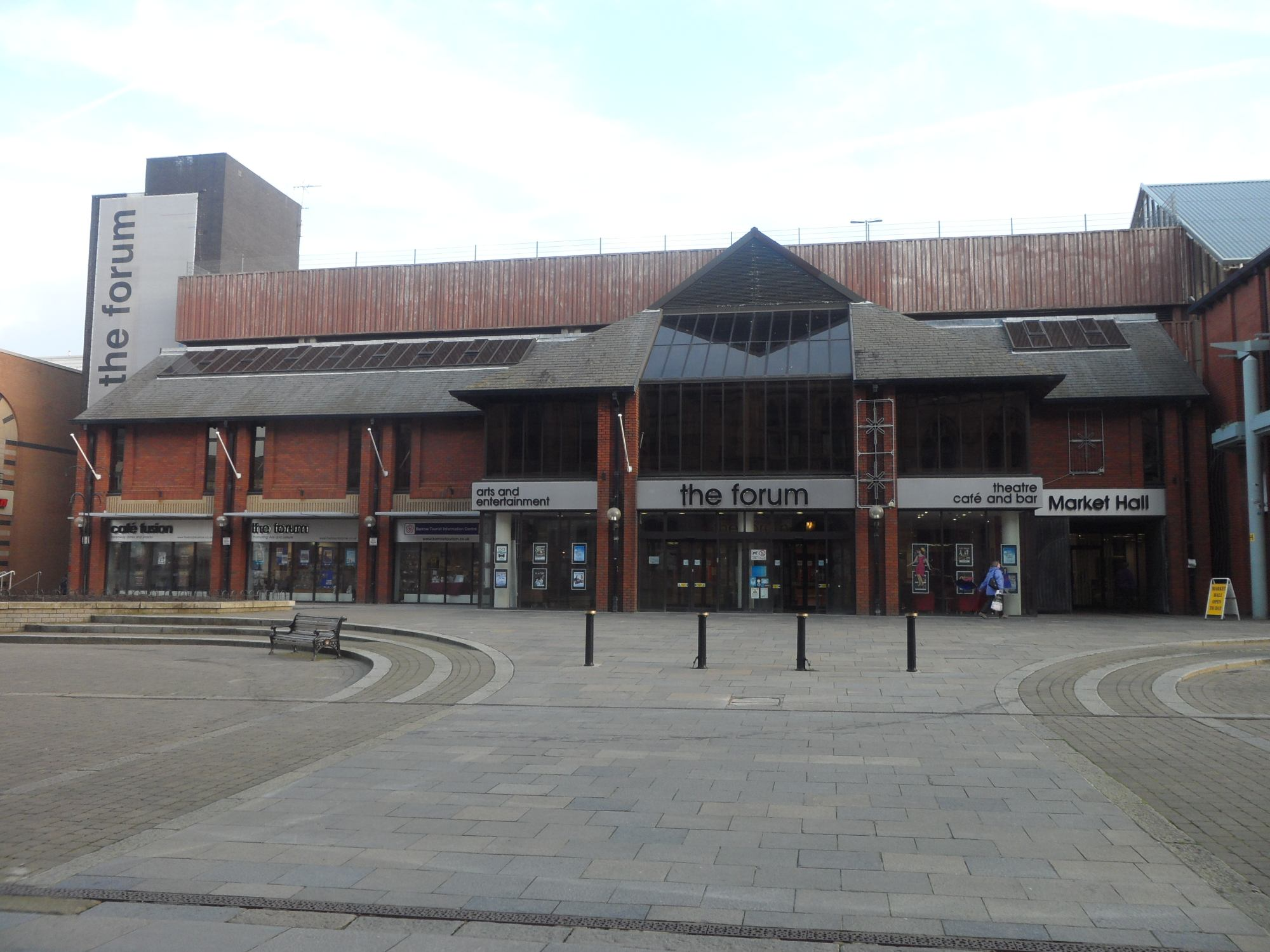
- The Forum viewed from Town Square in 2011
- Interactive map of The Forum
- Address: Duke Street; Barrow-in-Furness; Cumbria; LA14 1HH; United Kingdom
- Capacity: 530

Construction
- Opened: 1990
- Years active: 34

Website
- https://www.theforumbarrow.co.uk/

The Forum (formerly Forum 28) was a theatre, media and arts centre located in Barrow-in-Furness, Cumbria, England. The complex was home to an adaptable auditorium and stage, several conference and function rooms, Barrow's main tourist information centre and a Costa Coffee outlet. The Forum was situated in Central Barrow, opposite the town hall. A fatal outbreak of legionellosis in 2002 was traced to the Forum's air conditioning system.

The Forum was one of the area's main cultural and art centres and has hosted many musical artists, comedians and other performers, as well as hosting such events as the local multicultural festival and various career conventions. Many local and international theatre groups have used the Forum for their productions, plays and pantomimes.

the theatre closed in 2025 and is now scheduled for demolition.

== See also ==
- List of theatres in the United Kingdom
