= Barrow Jute Works =

Coordinates: 54.113°N 3.233°W

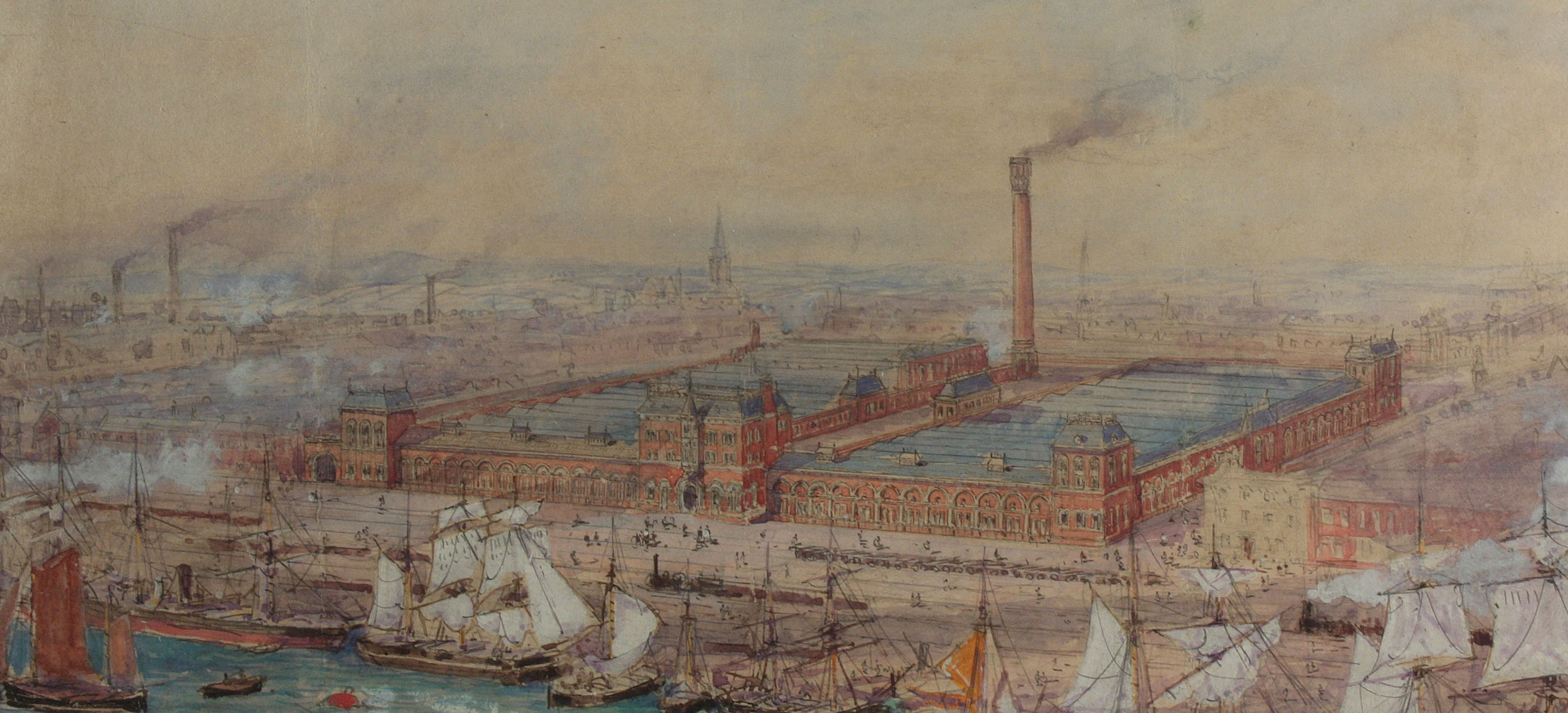
Painting of Barrow Jute works dated 1875. The Custom House is also visible to the right

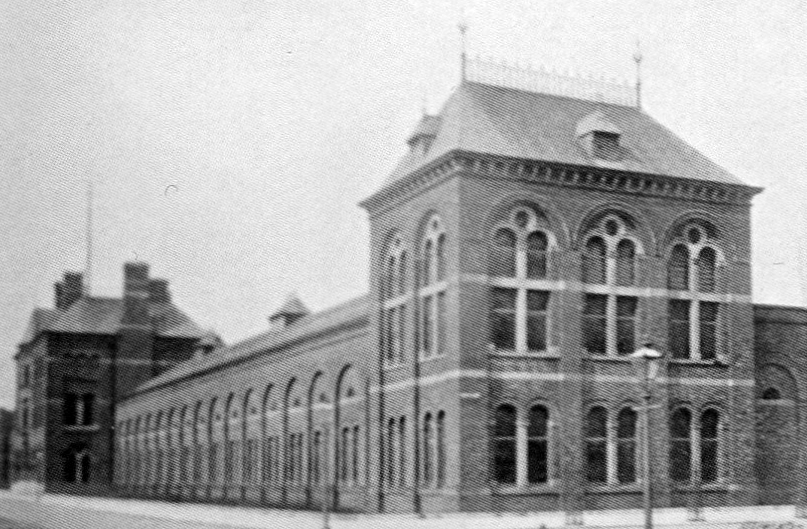
Photograph of the works as it appeared in 1898

The Barrow Jute Works was a jute and flax mill located in Barrow-in-Furness, Lancashire (now Cumbria), England during the late 19th and early 20th centuries. The mill was built for the Barrow and Calcutta Jute Company which was founded by James Ramsden in 1870 in an attempt to diversify Barrow's economy which was heavily focused on iron and steel production. The Jute Works itself was designed by architects Paley and Austin and occupied over 12-acres with a 580 feet (177 m) facade on Hindpool Road and 360 feet (110 m) along Abbey Road. The mill was served by its own railway station on a branch of the Furness Railway which connected it to the town's docks, steelworks and cornmill.

The mill's all female workforce peaked at 2,000, many of whom were Irish immigrants. The jute fabrics produced were used for a wide range of items including telegraph cables, ropes and artificial hair, later including the production of Kalemeit for carpets, rugs and window drapery. The quality of produce was acknowledged in 1878 at the Exposition Universelle in Paris, France where the Barrow and Calcutta Jute Company was awarded a gold medal in the field.

Two fires damaged the works during its history - 1879 and 1892, the latter occasion destroying half of the mill that was never rebuilt. Competition from the Indian jute trade as well as the large jute works in Dundee led to the mill's ultimate demise. Barrow Jute Works' iconic chimney was demolished in 1930, followed by the offices in 1948.

The site is now occupied by Hindpool Retail Park having also previously contained the Barrow Corporation Bus Depot up until its demolition in the 1980s. The southernmost part of the site fronting Abbey Road contains the former John Whinnerah Institute and Lakeland Laundry building.

== See also ==
- Jute trade
- Barrow Hematite Steel Company
- Vickers Shipbuilding and Engineering
