= Imperial Hotel, Barrow-in-Furness =

Coordinates: 54.1114°N 3.2295°W

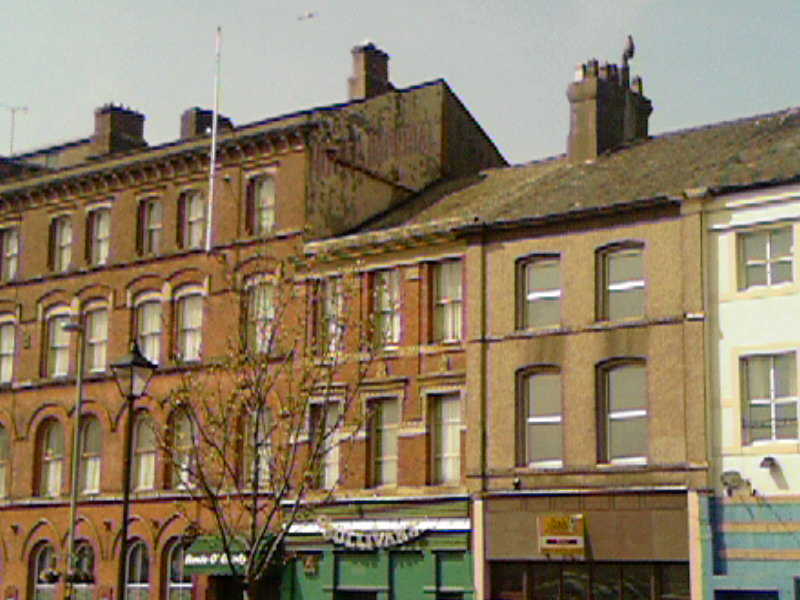

The Imperial Hotel (formerly Hotel Imperial) located on Cornwallis Street in Barrow-in-Furness, Cumbria, England is a 4-star Grade II listed hotel built in 1875. The iconic five storey building was designed by architect Thomas Bennet and, like many Barrow buildings, constructed of red brick and sandstone. Other notable features of the building are the balcony located directly above the main entrance and the two decorative lamps standing in front of the hotel, which are also Grade II listed.

The hotel underwent a £1 million renovation in 2012 by businessman Stuart Bowes, owner of the nearby Majestic Hotel. It now contains 49 rooms, a rooftop terrace and the Aspire cocktail lounge.

== See also ==
- Listed buildings in Barrow-in-Furness
