= National Westminster Bank, Barrow-in-Furness =

Coordinates: 54°06′50″N 3°13′51″W

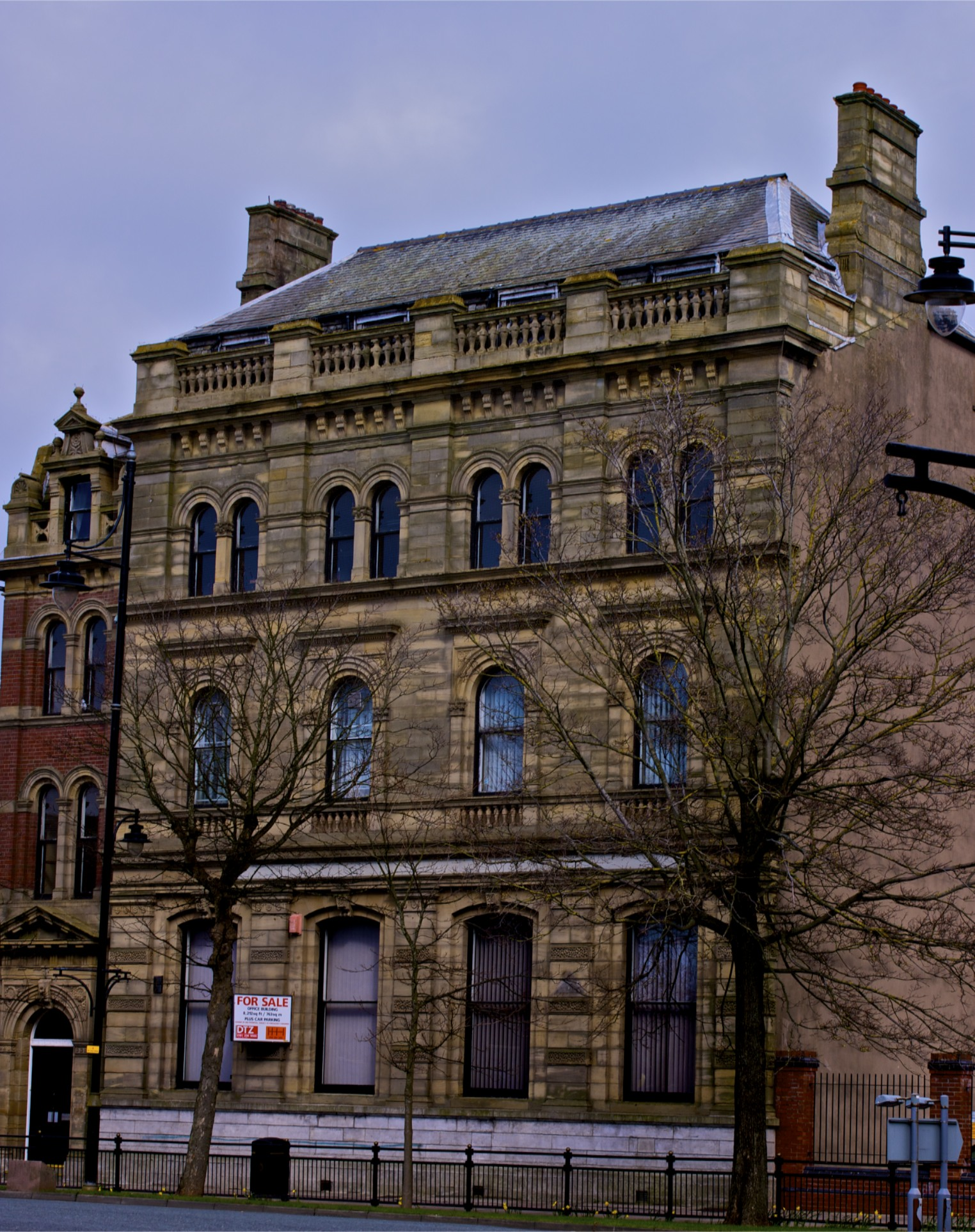
The National Westminster Bank in 2008

The National Westminster Bank building in Barrow-in-Furness, Cumbria, England is located at the intersection of Abbey Road and Duke Street. It was designed by Paley and Austin architects and built between 1873–74 and has been designated a Grade II listed building by English Heritage. Built for the Lancaster branch of the National Westminster Bank it was a major component of the Ramsden Square scheme, one of the planned town's two main squares and focal points. It is one of three former 'Nat West' properties with listed building status in the Borough and currently houses a carpet shop in the lower floors.

== See also ==
- Listed buildings in Barrow-in-Furness
