= Duke Street, Barrow-in-Furness =

Street in Barrow-in-Furness, United Kingdom

Coordinates: 54.112992°N 3.229642°W

Duke Street
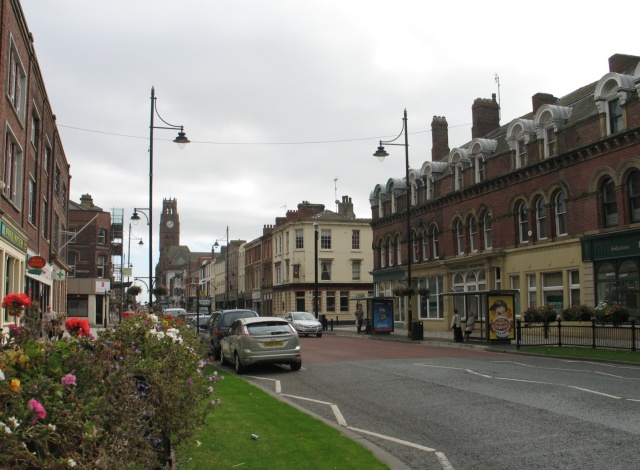
- Duke Street looking towards Barrow Town Hall
- Length: 0.8 mi (1.3 km)
- Location: Barrow-in-Furness, England, UK
- East end: A5087 Strand
- West end: A590 Walney Road

Duke Street is a road running through the town centre and Hindpool area of Barrow-in-Furness, England. Stretching almost one mile from east to west it connects two major A roads as well as intersecting Abbey Road roughly midway. Designed by Sir James Ramsden as the centrepiece of the 19th century planned town of Barrow, Duke Street is home to three squares (Ramsden Square, Town Square and Schneider Square) alongside many listed buildings including Barrow Town Hall and the Main Public Library. The Forum performing arts centre and Craven Park Stadium (home of the rugby league side Barrow Raiders) are also located on Duke Street.

== Listed buildings ==
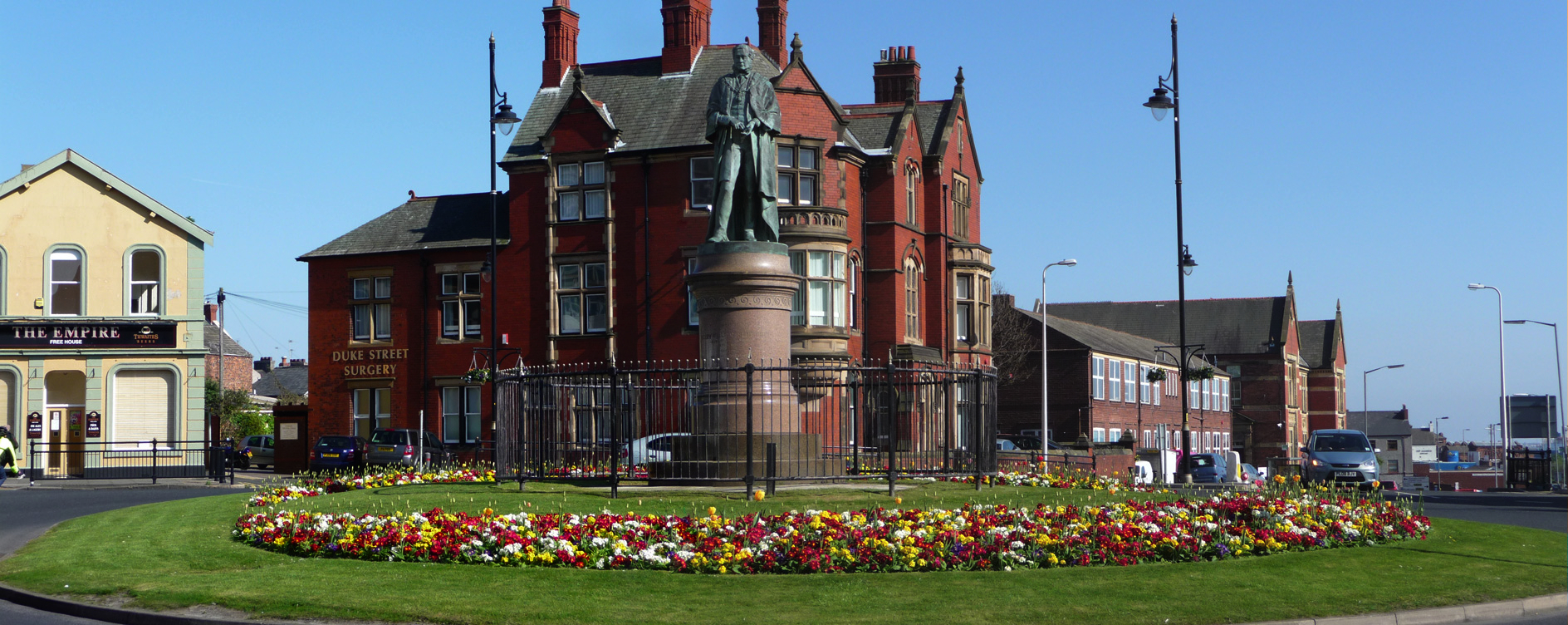
Schneider Square

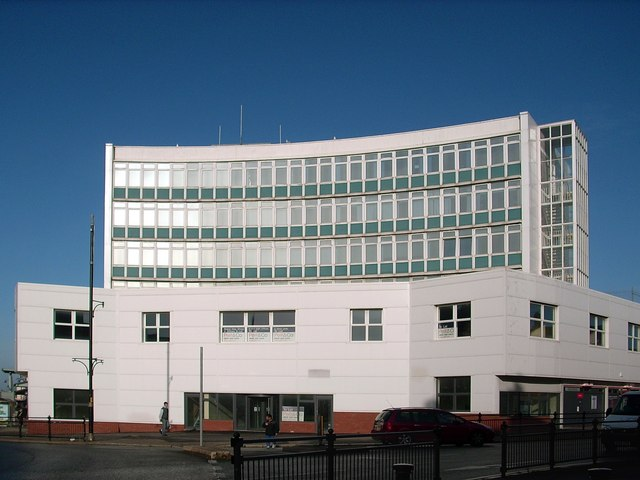
Furness House and 'The Mall'

The list below includes all listed buildings located on Duke Street.

- 4 Duke Street, Duke Street Surgery (Grade II)
- 63, 65 and 67 Duke Street (Grade II)
- 77 and 79 Duke Street (Grade II)
- 81, 83, 85, 87 and 89 Duke Street (Grade II)
- 92, 94 and 96 Duke Street, Barclays Bank (Grade II)
- 101 which is Clarkson Hirst solicitors, 103, 105, 107 and 109 Duke Street which is a restaurant called Dodona(Grade II)
- 111, 113, 115, 117 and 119 Duke Street (Grade II)
- 121 and 122 Duke Street, Vibe Station (Grade II)
- 125 Duke Street (Grade II)
- 127, 129 and 131 Duke Street (Grade II)
- Higher Grade School (Grade II)
- Barrow-in-Furness Town Hall (Grade II*)
- Hotel Majestic (Grade II)
- Main Public Library (Grade II)
- National Westminster Bank (Grade II)
- Statue of James Ramsden (Grade II)
- Statue of Henry Schneider (Grade II)
- St. Mary of Furness Roman Catholic Church (Grade II)
