= Barrow-in-Furness Main Public Library =

Grade II listed Beaux-Arts style building in Barrow-in-Furness, England

Coordinates: 54.1145°N 3.2314°W

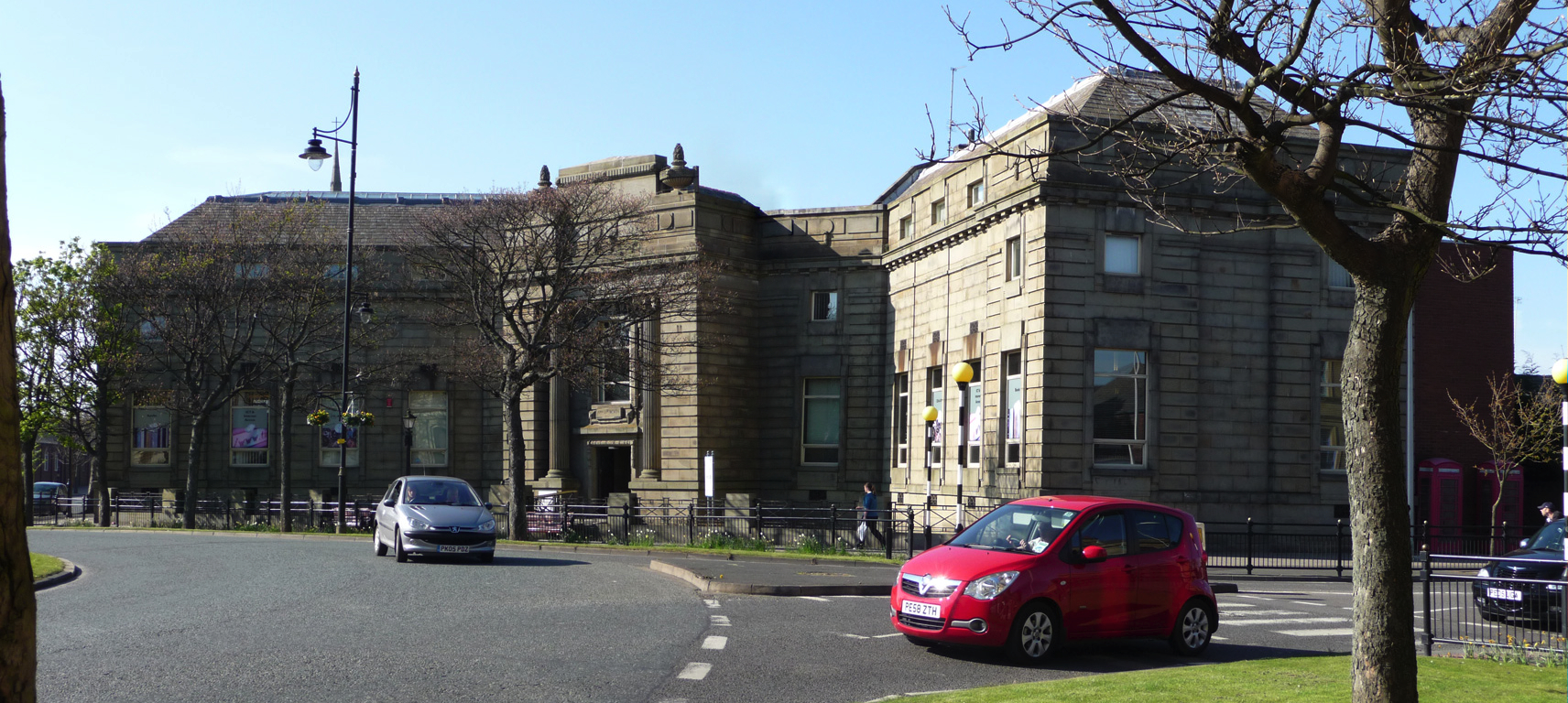
Barrow-in-Furness Main Public Library

Barrow-in-Furness Main Public Library (more usually known as Barrow Central Library or Barrow Library) is a Grade II listed Beaux-Arts style building located at Ramsden Square, Barrow-in-Furness, England. Operated since 2023 by Westmorland and Furness Council, it is the largest library in the town and the present structure, designed by J A Charles was originally built as a Carnegie library with support from the Carnegie Foundation.

The first library in Barrow was opened on 18 September 1882 in temporary iron buildings in Schneider Square; in 1887 this was transferred to a room within Barrow Town Hall. The growing population meant that a larger building was needed and this was eventually met by the construction of the present accommodation at the junction of Abbey Road with Ramsden Square. The building itself bears a date of 1915 (denoted by an engraving by the main entrance which reads 'ANNO DNI MCMXV'), although delays brought about by World War I meant that it wasn't actually completed and opened until 1922.

The library formerly housed the Furness Museum which held artefacts both from across the world and also from the local area. The museum (always operated by Barrow Borough Council) was opened in 1930 in an upstairs lecture room. It closed in 1991 and most of the exhibits were eventually moved to larger purpose-built premises next to Walney Channel - the Dock Museum. After building modifications in 1998, the library has also worked with the Cumbria Archive Service in the joint operation of a local archives or county record office branch. This now shares a public searchroom together with the local studies library.

Besides the Central Library there are currently five other libraries in the present borough: Askam, Barrow Island, Dalton, Roose and Walney. A sixth branch at Ormsgill has now been replaced by a library link facility in Ormsgill Children's Centre
