= Custom House, Barrow-in-Furness =

Building in Barrow-in-Furness, Cumbria, England

Coordinates: 54.1128°N 3.2331°W

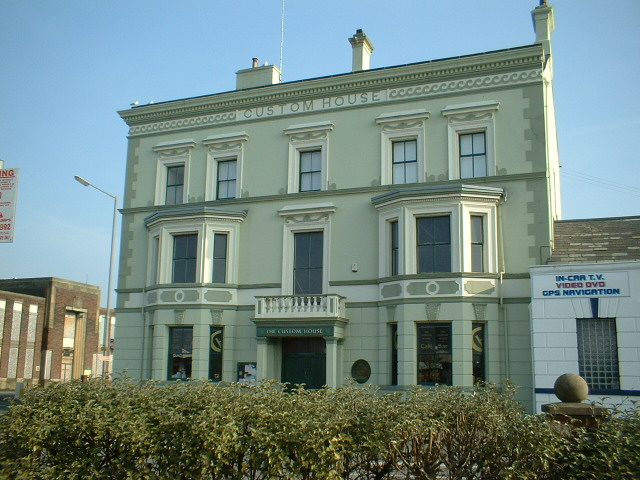

The Custom House in Barrow-in-Furness, Cumbria, England is a former government building, having housed the customs offices for trade handled at the Ports of Barrow and Lancaster. Initially constructed as a hotel around 1870, it took on its most notable role as a custom house in 1880, regulating custom from the Port of Lancaster.

The four-storey Italianate style building stands on the corner of Abbey Road and Hindpool Road. The Custom House was granted Grade II listed building status in 1976 when it was a social club. It has since been converted to contain a number of restaurants and leisure facilities, including LazerZone
