= 2002 Barrow-in-Furness legionellosis outbreak =

Disease outbreak in England

Coordinates: 54°06′44″N 3°13′40″W

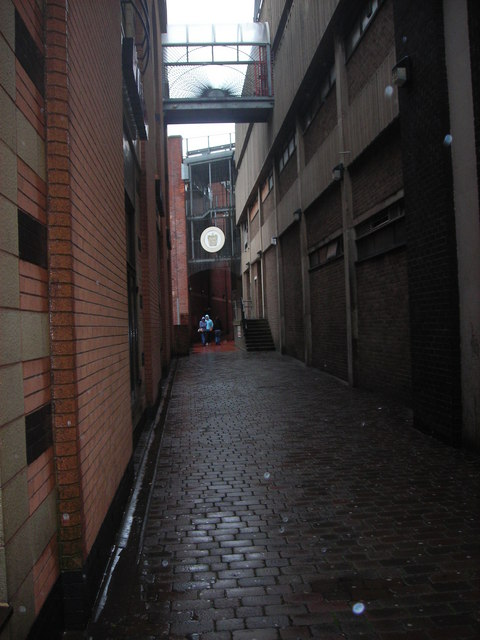
The alleyway between the Forum 28 and Wilkinson where the faulty AC unit was located

The 2002 Barrow-in-Furness Legionnaires' disease outbreak was a fatal outbreak of Legionellosis which occurred in Barrow-in-Furness, Cumbria, England.

The first fatality occurred on 2 August 2002. The source of the bacteria was later found to be from steam coming out of a badly maintained air conditioning unit. The system was located in the council-run arts centre Forum 28, with the vent emitting the disease over a busy alleyway in the town centre. Ultimately seven people died and 172 cases were reported (a case fatality rate of around 4%), ranking as the second worst in British history and seventh worst globally by death count.

The coroner for Furness and South Cumbria criticised the council for its failings with regard to health and safety at the conclusion of an inquest into the seven deaths. In 2006, council employee Gillian Beckingham and employer Barrow Borough Council were cleared of seven charges of manslaughter. Beckingham, the council senior architect, was fined £15,000 and the authority £125,000. The authority maintained that Beckingham was not responsible for the building or the defective plant and dismissed the building Technical Manager Kevin Borthwick. He was later re-instated to his position following a challenge by his union. The borough council was the first public body in the country to have faced corporate manslaughter charges. Beckingham maintained that a contract to maintain the plant was in place but failings of others meant that the work was never undertaken, nor was the lack of adequate maintenance pursued by those responsible for the building. Following the trials, the contractor responsible for maintaining the defective plant, Interserve, settled a £1.5 million claim by the Council for damages.

== See also ==
- List of Legionellosis outbreaks
- List of disasters of the United Kingdom and preceding states
- 2002 in the United Kingdom
