= Barrow Park Cenotaph =

War memorial Barrow-in-Furness, England

Coordinates: 54.1178°N 3.2207°W

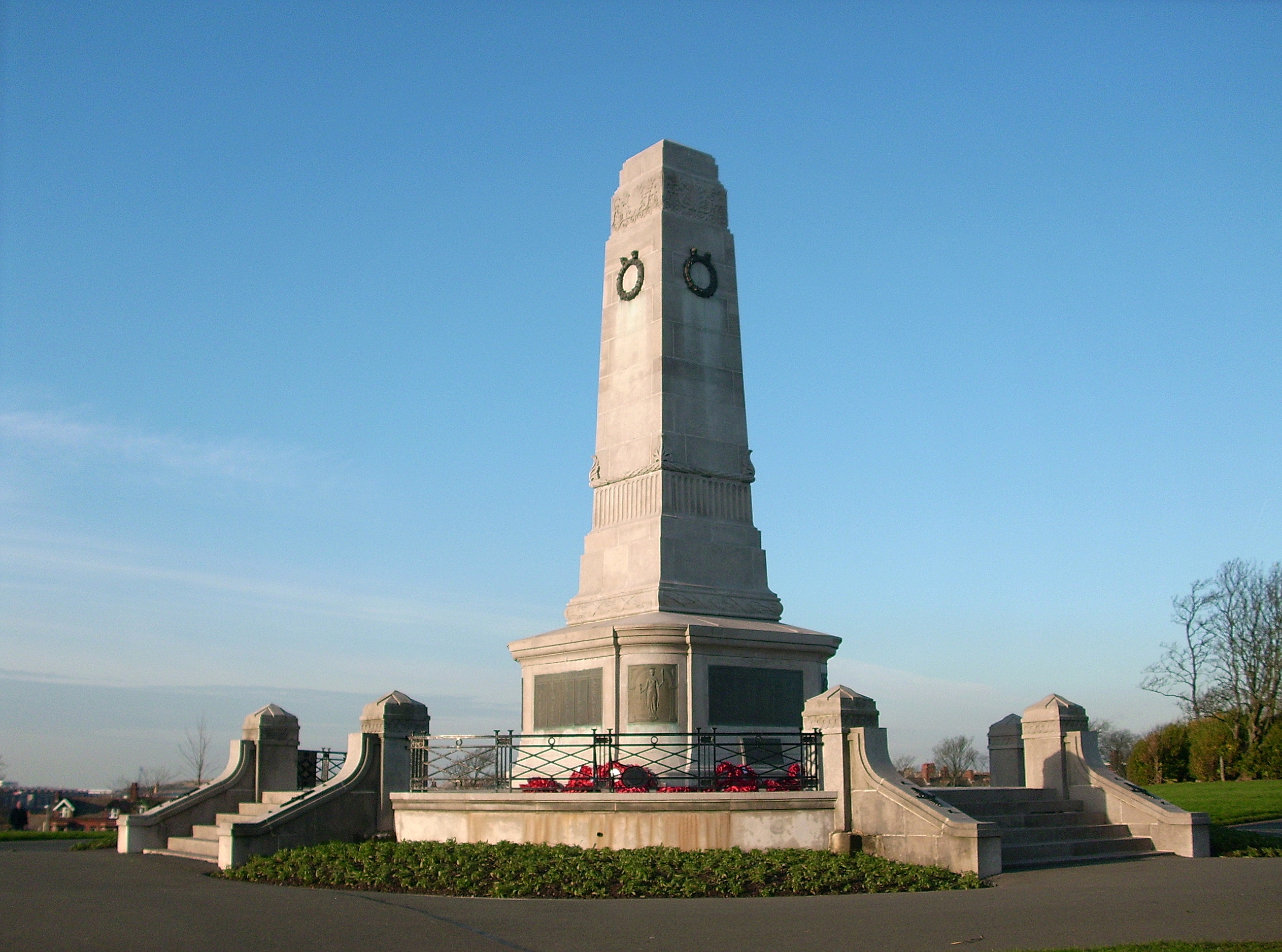
The Barrow Park Cenotaph

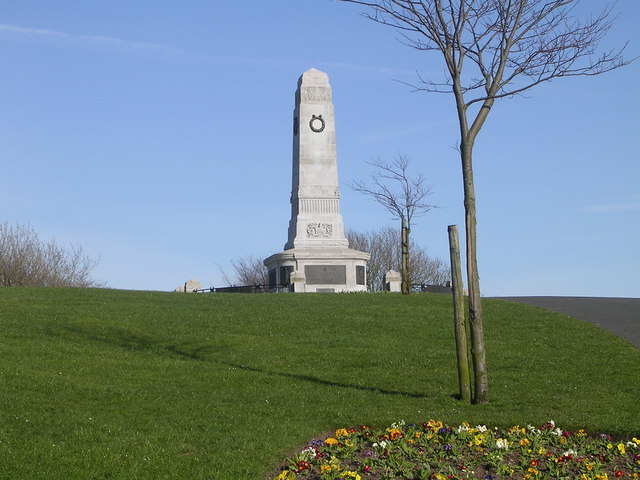
The War Memorial from the main Barrow Park hill

The Barrow Park Cenotaph is the main war memorial in the UK town of Barrow-in-Furness, Cumbria, North West England. Located in Barrow's main public park, the structure is grade II listed. It is made from Portland limestone and is pillar like in appearance. It was built in 1919 in commemoration of the 616 Barrovian men who lost their lives in combat during World War I, however since then the names of 274 more locals have been added (268 of these being fatalities of World War II and 6 of the Korean War). The cenotaph currently only bears the names of Barrovians lost during these three wars whilst in military action (i.e. excluding civilians killed in the Barrow Blitz). Two inscriptions on the memorial read, To the glory of God and in honoured memory of the men of Barrow-in-Furness who fell in the Great War and in honoured memory of all service personnel who gave their lives in the 1939–1945 War. Also Korea and Cyprus campaigns having made the supreme sacrifice that we might live lest we forget.

== See also ==
- Cenotaph
- Barrow Blitz
