= Barrow Blitz =

WWII aerial bombardment of British city

The Hindenburg flying over Walney Island in 1936.

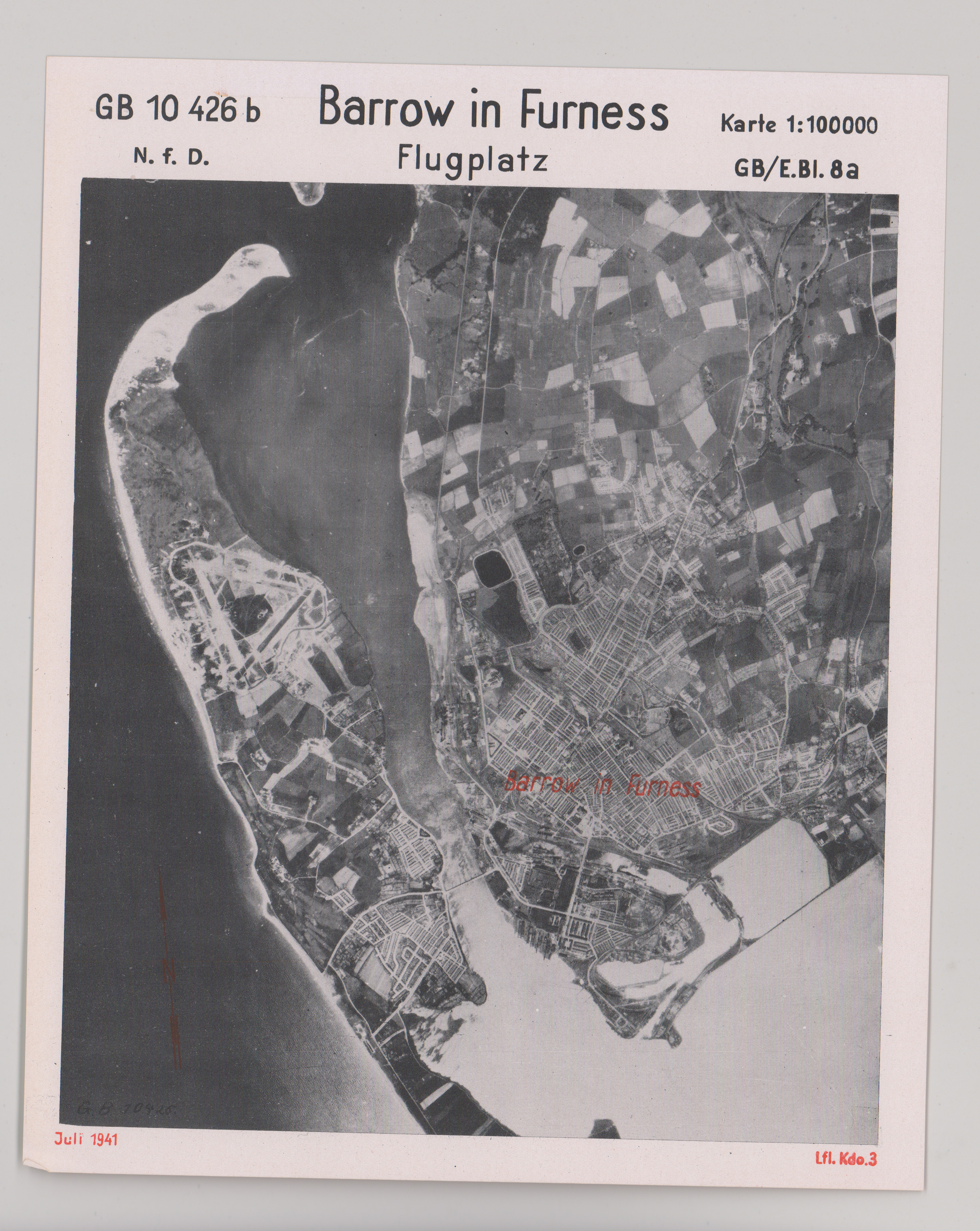
Target dossier of Barrow-in-Furness, German Luftwaffe July 1941

Damage caused by bombing during 1941 on Newland Street looking towards Hindpool Road.

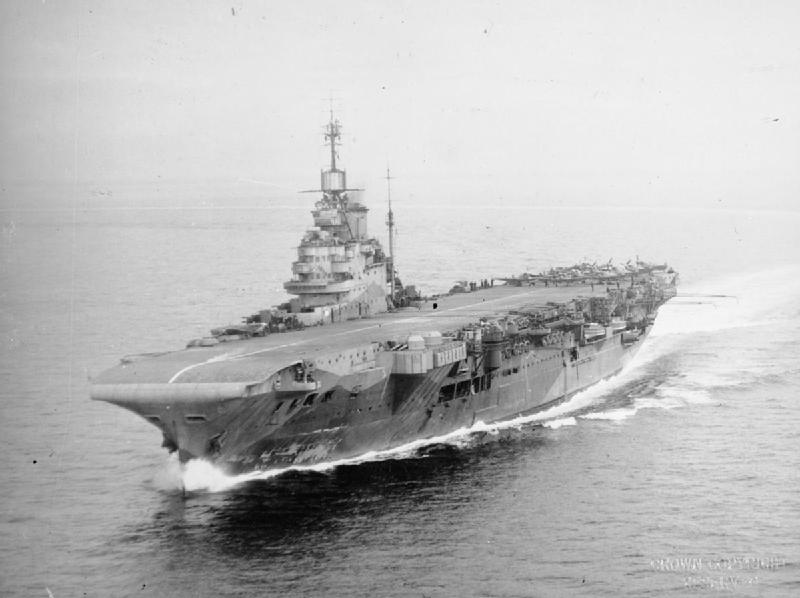
Barrow was one of the most successful shipbuilding centres in Europe, the main reason it became a target. Aircraft carrier HMS Indomitable was launched by Winston Churchill in the town in 1940.

The Barrow Blitz is the name given to the Luftwaffe bombings of Barrow-in-Furness, United Kingdom during World War II. They took place primarily during April and May 1941, although the earliest Luftwaffe bombing occurred in September 1940. VSEL shipyard was the main target for bombing alongside Barrow's steelworks, which were formerly the largest in the world.

== Prelude ==
Many Barrovians believe the first sign of German interest of the town was in May 1936, when the zeppelin LZ-129 Hindenburg flew very low and slowly over Barrow, which locals and government officials alike believed was spying on the shipyard, although it claimed to be simply carrying passengers on a luxury trip. The town, with a population of around 75,000 in 1941, was targeted by the Luftwaffe mainly for its shipbuilding industry (similar to the Clydebank Blitz) which was one of the most sophisticated in the world and built many submarines and ships for the Royal Navy.

== Artillery and defences ==
During the Second World War, Walney Island was home to two of the country's many coastal artillery installations (Hilpsford Fort and Fort Walney), and numerous pillboxes can to this day be found littered across the Walney coastline. They were used as lookouts and contained rifles and light machine guns that could be used to defend Barrow against the Luftwaffe. The entrance to a large underground air-raid shelter that was used by shipyard workers can be found in the car park of the Waterfront Barrow-in-Furness development. A large unit of the Royal Air Force was based at Barrow/Walney Island Airport which was expanded during the war in an effort to aid Britain's air defences.

== 1941 raids ==
The difficulty of solely targeting Barrow's shipyard meant that many residential neighbourhoods were bombed instead; 83 civilians were killed, 330 injured, and over 10,000 houses were damaged or destroyed during the Blitz, about 25 percent of the town's housing stock. Surrounding towns and villages were often mistaken for Barrow and were attacked instead, while many streets in Barrow were severely damaged. Bombing during mid-April 1941 caused significant damage to a central portion of Abbey Road, completely destroying the Waverley Hotel as well as Christ Church and the Abbey Road Baptist Church. The town's main public baths and Essoldo Theatre were also severely damaged, however they were repaired within years. Hawcoat Lane is a street that is most noted for taking a direct destructive hit in early May 1941. Barrow has been described as somewhat unprepared for the Blitz, as there were only enough public shelters for 5 percent of the town's population; some people who lived in the town centre were even forced to seek refuge in hedgerows on the outskirts of Barrow. This shortage of shelters was believed to have led to excessively high casualties. Two fire watchers were killed in May 1941 when the hammer head crane they were stationed in at Vickers Shipyard was bombed by the Luftwaffe.

The headquarters of Barrow's anti-aircraft defences was in the Furness Abbey Hotel, a sandstone building next to the former railway station by the ruins of the abbey, in a valley screened by trees, it would seem to have been an unlikely target. In May 1941 it was attacked and badly damaged by the Luftwaffe. Most of the hotel was subsequently demolished and the remaining part became a public house/restaurant known as 'The Abbey Tavern'. Barrow Central Station was heavily damaged on 7 May 1941; a First World War memorial located within it still bears the holes and gashes caused by the World War II bombings, as does Furness Railway No 3 (Coppernob) now kept at York railway museum.

== Aftermath ==
A local housewife, Nella Last wrote diaries of her everyday experiences on the home front during the war and after for the Mass-Observation project which were published in a series of books. Her memoirs were later adapted for television.

Stella Rimington, later head of MI5, moved out of London to Barrow at the age of four when the war started, and lived there during the Blitz there. She described hiding under the stairs, windows being blown out, and ceilings falling down. On a very bad night, she walked through the bombs to an air raid shelter.

Barrow's main war memorial is a cenotaph located in Barrow Park. It bears the names of hundreds of Barrovians who died in combat during various wars, including 616 in the First World War, 268 in the Second World War, and 6 in the Korean War. The Dock Museum in Hindpool contains an exhibit about the Barrow Blitz.

== Documentary ==
In 2016, filmmaker and Barrow Sixth Form student Matthew Dodd created a documentary to commemorate the Barrow Blitz's 75th anniversary, entitled The Barrow Blitz: 75 Years On.

== Timeline ==
Timeline of events during the Barrow Blitz.

- September 1940
  - The first compulsory blackout in Barrow.
  - 300 incendiaries are dropped on Salthouse, and a 5-year-old child becomes the first victim of the Barrow Blitz.
- May 1941
  - Bombing intensifies as the Luftwaffe drops land-mines, incendiaries, and high explosives.
  - Barrow Central railway station is completely destroyed by bombing.
  - Some 2,250 children are evacuated from the town.
- June 1941
  - A further 4,000 children are evacuated as the death toll from bombing exceeds 80.
- January 1942
  - The last bombs of the Blitz are dropped on Barrow, with no recorded casualties.
- March 1942
  - The last air-raid siren in Barrow was recorded on 25 March.

== See also ==
- The Blitz
- Barrow Park Cenotaph
- Timeline of Barrow-in-Furness
- Housewife, 49
- Vickers Ltd. Shipbuilding
- Barrow/Walney Island Airport
