= Devonshire Buildings =

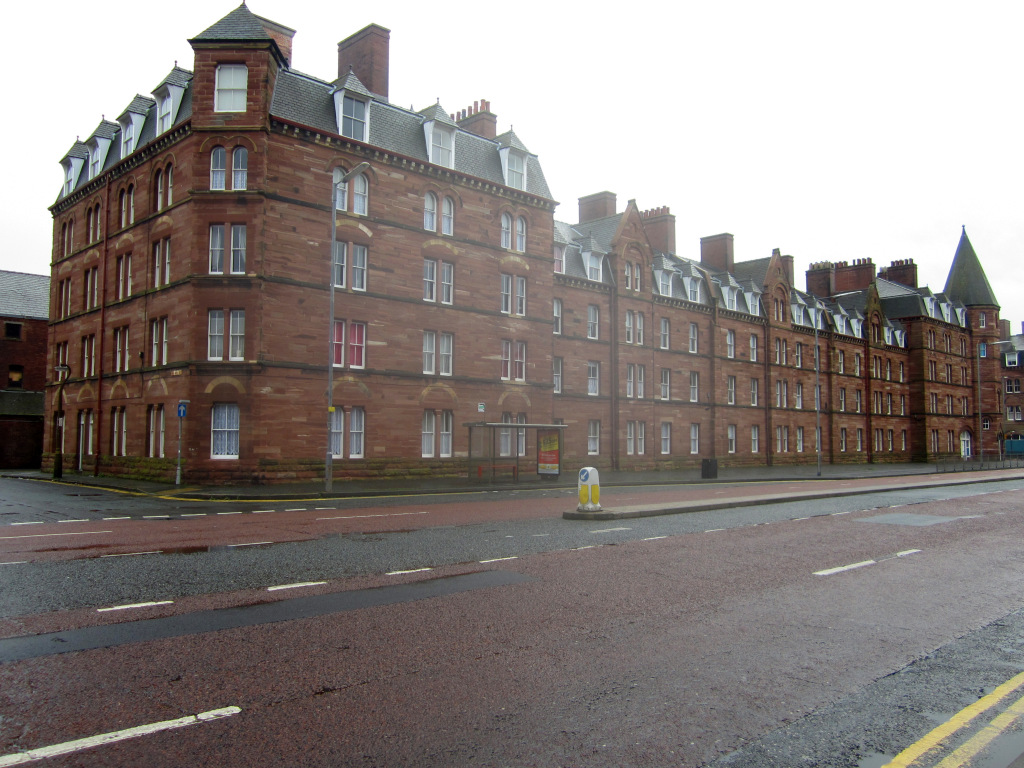
- The northernmost block of the Devonshire Buildings viewed from Michaelson Road

- Location in Cumbria
- 54.1041°N 3.2311°W

History
- Built: 1875

Site notes
- Architect: Paley and Austin

Listed Building – Grade II*
- Designated: 6 May 1976
- Reference no.: 1197845

The Devonshire Buildings are two adjacent apartment buildings in the Barrow Island area of Barrow-in-Furness, Cumbria, England. They are both recorded in the National Heritage List for England as designated Grade II* listed buildings.

Constructed in the 1870s for the Barrow Iron Ship Building Company to house local shipyard workers, the buildings are nearly symmetrical and have octagonal towers at the end of each block. The buildings are similar to tenements in Glasgow, Scotland, which were inspired by housing in France. Between 2008 and 2013 Devonshire Buildings were extensively refurbished by the Holker Group.

Similar tenements exist across Barrow Island, with those on Barque, Brig, Sloop and Steamer Streets also having listed building status. The Vickerstown estate on Walney Island was constructed between 1898 and 1901 in an effort to relieve overcrowding in the Barrow Island tenements, which had already seen some shipyard workers forced to live aboard the liner SS Alaska, which was moored in Barrow docks.

== See also ==
- Listed buildings in Barrow-in-Furness
- List of non-ecclesiastical works by Paley and Austin
- Scotch Buildings
