= Hawcoat =

Settlement in Cumbria, England

Coordinates: 54.137°N 3.214°W

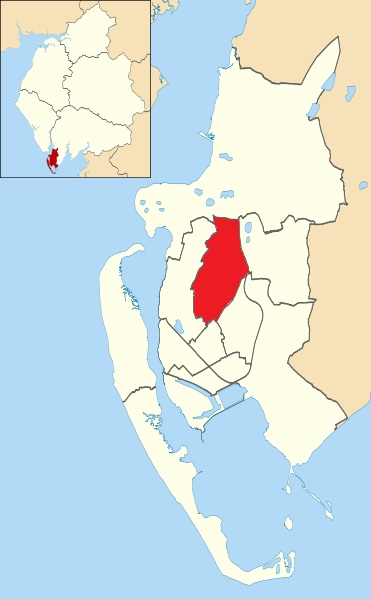
- Population: 4,922 (2011)
- Unitary authority: Westmorland and Furness
- Ceremonial county: Cumbria
- Region: North West
- Country: England
- Sovereign state: United Kingdom
- Post town: BARROW-IN-FURNESS
- Postcode district: LA
- Dialling code: 01229
- Police: Cumbria
- Fire: Cumbria
- Ambulance: North West
- UK Parliament: Barrow and Furness

Hawcoat is an area, Town Council ward and former district-level ward of Barrow-in-Furness, Cumbria, England. Historically part of Lancashire, it is one of Barrow's most northerly wards and is bordered by Roose, Newbarns, Parkside, Ormsgill and the town of Dalton-in-Furness to the north.

Whilst still an electoral ward for Barrow Town Council, the ward was combined at a district/ local authority level with Newbarns ward in April 2023 following formation of the new Westmorland and Furness Local Authority.

== Geography ==
Hawcoat lies on small hill on the southwest of the Furness Peninsula, rising up from Walney Channel to its west and peaking at 84m. From its peak there are quite extensive views incorporating the Isle of Man, Snowdonia, Blackpool, across Morecambe Bay Ingleborough, the Howgills, and the fells of the Lake District. The small stream of Dane Ghyll rises to the east of the high ground, and flows south and east into Mill Beck at Furness Abbey in the Valley of the Deadly Nightshade, providing a clear eastern boundary to the area. Hawcoat forms the north-eastern part of Barrow-in-Furness, and its boundary to the south is Abbey Road. To the west, it is separated by a few fields and Barrow Cemetery from the lower-lying Ormsgill.

Bus service route 1 serves most of Hawcoat, connecting the district to Barrow station, the town centre and Walney Island. Route 6 and X6 run through Hawcoat and provide longer-distance connections to Dalton-in-Furness, Ulverston, Grange-over-Sands, Winderemere and Kendal. Abbey Road on the southern border of Hawcoat was formerly the A590 road, and remains the main arterial route through Barrow and the main road into the town centre from Hawcoat. The contemporary A590 is accessed either by taking Abbey Road in the direction of Dalton-in-Furness and then Park Road, via Rakesmoor Lane to the north of Hawcoat and then Park Road, or to the west via Bank Lane. Within Hawcoat, the major east–west and north–south roads intersect in the north-western corner of the district. Hawcoat Lane to the south and Dalton Lane to the east form the main roads, while Ormsgill Lane to the west and Raksemoor Lane to the north are somewhat smaller.

== History ==
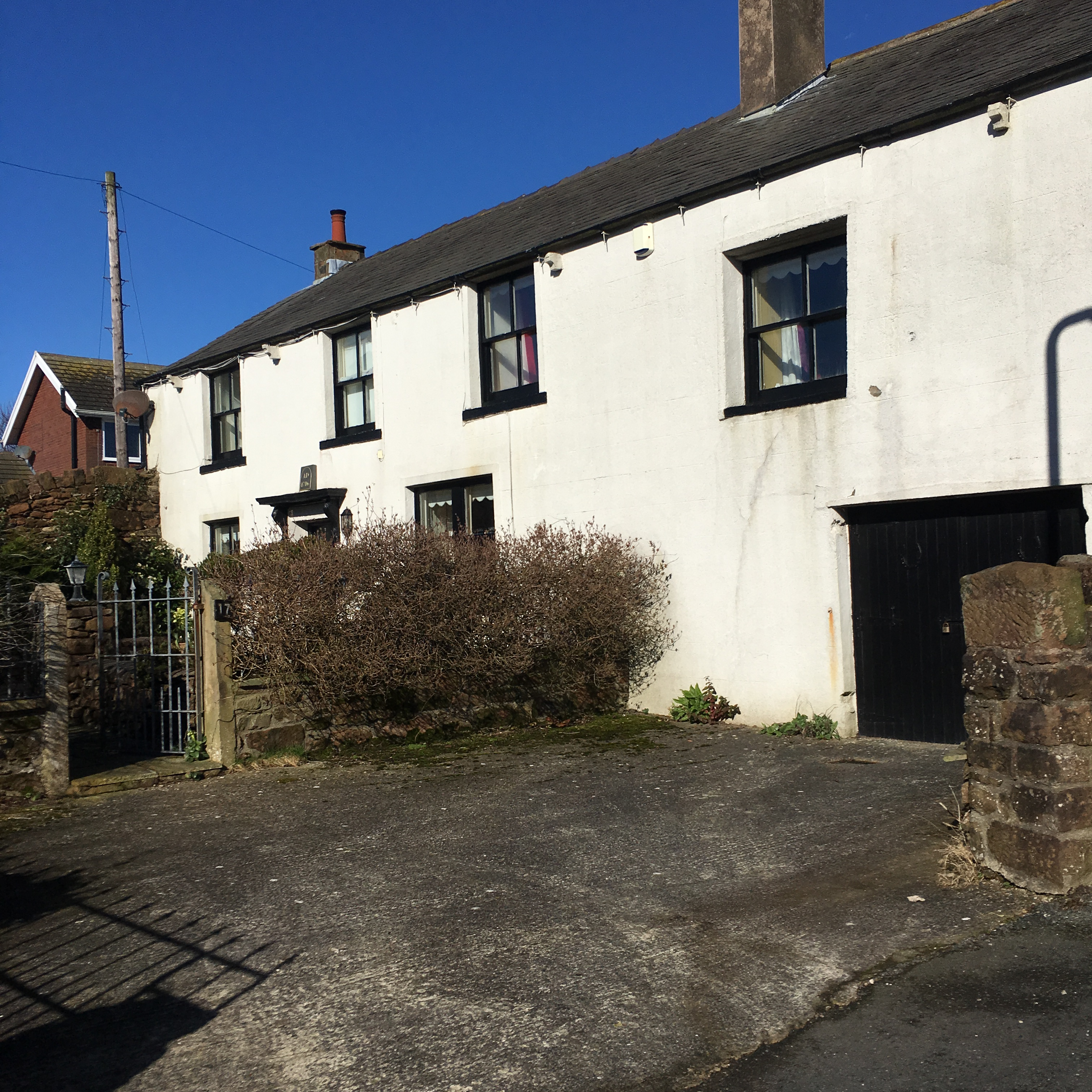
17 Roanhead Lane within the original Hawcoat village is dated 1716

Hawcoat is one of the few places in Barrow that has been permanently inhabited since the Middle Ages; Hawcoat was named and identified as Hietun in the Domesday Book, as a fief within the Manor of Hougun. Prior to the growth of Barrow, Hawcoat village was the largest on the peninsula to the west of the town of Dalton-in-Furness, and gave its name to one of the four quarters or 'bierleys' of the parish of Dalton. This quarter covered the entirety of the end of the Furness Peninsula, including the surrounding Islands of Furness, such that the latter-town of Barrow was in 1769 "only a hamlet in the township of Hawcoat."

While the town of Barrow grew in the nineteenth century, Hawcoat remained a village outside the built-up area of the new town. Some suburban development stretched into the southern and western parts of what is now Hawcoat ward in the 1920s and 1930s, and some of this on Hawcoat Lane was the site of destruction as part of the Barrow Blitz bombings that targeted the town's shipyard and steelworks during World War 2. These suburban developments had grown to reach the site of the old village by the early 1950s.

A major expansion of suburban housing in Hawcoat subsequently occurred in the 1960s as a direct response to the expansion of Vickers shipyard, when it was briefly referred to as 'Polaris Village' after the Polaris programme which involved Barrow-built Resolution-class submarines. Dane Ghyll Primary School, in the middle of the new development, opened in 1971, reflecting the expansion of the population. Furness General Hospital, replacing four smaller hospitals in Barrow, was opened in Hawcoat in 1984.

== Demographics ==
In 2011, Hawcoat had a population of 4,922, representing a 7% decrease over a 10-year period. The ward has more female residents than male and is the most ethnically diverse ward of Barrow, with 4.3% of the local population belonging to an ethnic group other than White British. Hawcoat covers an area of 4.58 square kilometres and has a population density of 1,074/km^{2} (compared to 886/km^{2} in Barrow as a whole). Hawcoat is Barrow's least deprived ward, with higher than average house prices and two areas where properties regularly sell for close to half a million GBP - The Crescent and The Gardens.

== Facilities ==
Hawcoat is the location of Furness General Hospital, though the nearest GP Practices are in Barrow town centre. Dane Ghyll Primary School is the area's primary school, for children aged 4–11, in the heart of the 1970s-built estate, and St Paul's CofE Junior School, affiliated with Saint Paul's, the parish church of Hawcoat, teaches children aged 7–11. Thorncliffe School, on the western border of the ward, was the secondary school for children aged 12–16 from its construction in 1970 until 2009, when it was merged with other local secondaries to form Furness Academy. The old Thorncliffe site has since been redeveloped into homes. Chetwynde School, formerly a private school, sits just outside the ward and is now a state-funded free school for children aged 4–16.

Holker Old Boys F.C., which competes in the North West Counties Football League, is based in Hawcoat at Rakesmoor Lane. Hawcoat Park Sports and Social Club, formerly known as Vickers Sports Club (having been established by Vickers) is a popular recreational facility consisting of pitches, lawns and tennis courts. It is located in the southern periphery of Hawcoat and is also home to the Walney Terriers American Football Club.

== See also ==
- Timeline of Barrow-in-Furness
