= Barrow Hematite Steel Company =

UK business

- Type: Public
- Industry: Steel; Industrial manufacturing
- Founded: 1859
- Founder: Henry Schneider
- Defunct: 1963
- Headquarters: Barrow-in-Furness

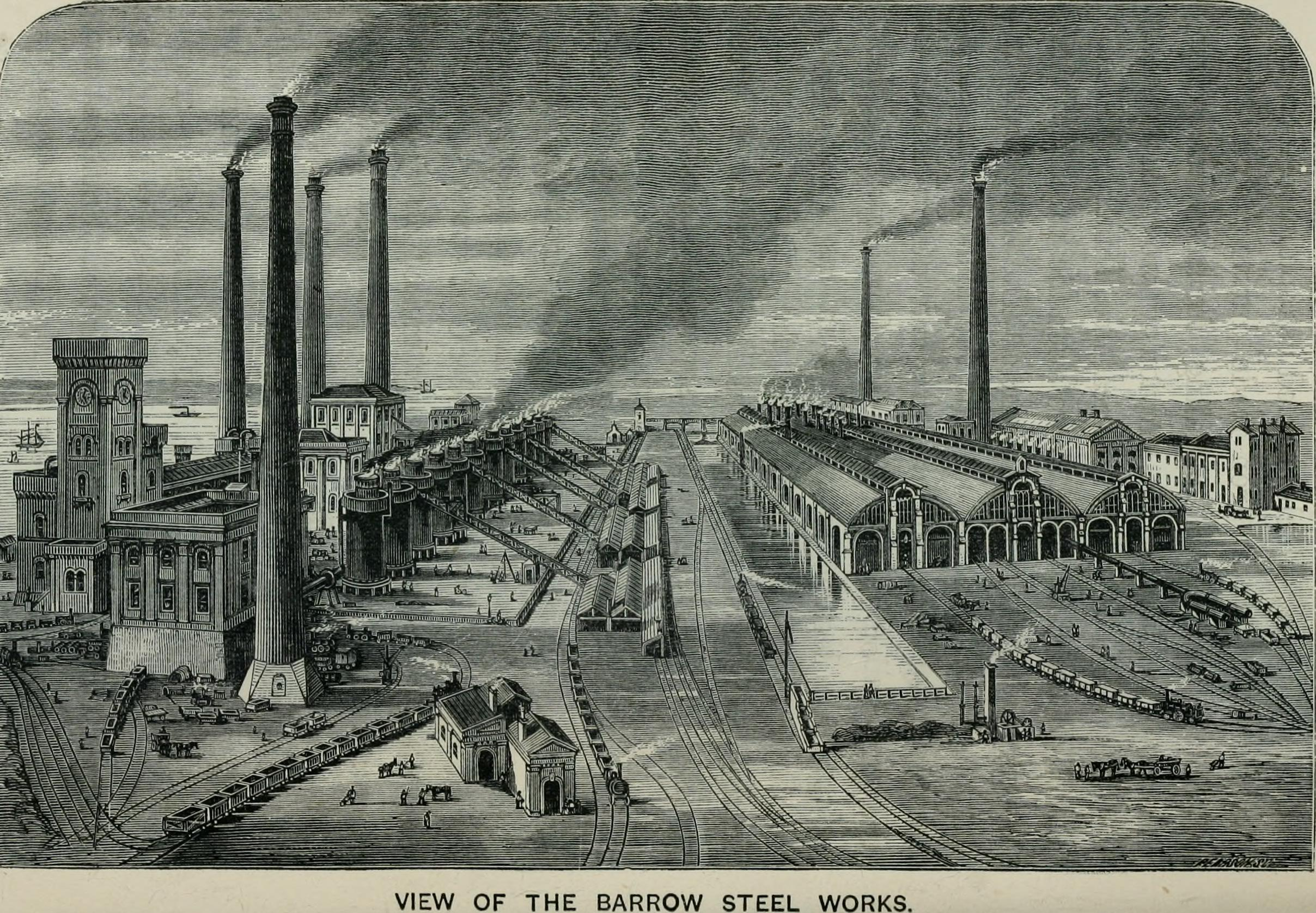
The steelworks around 1873

The steelworks as they appeared in 1920

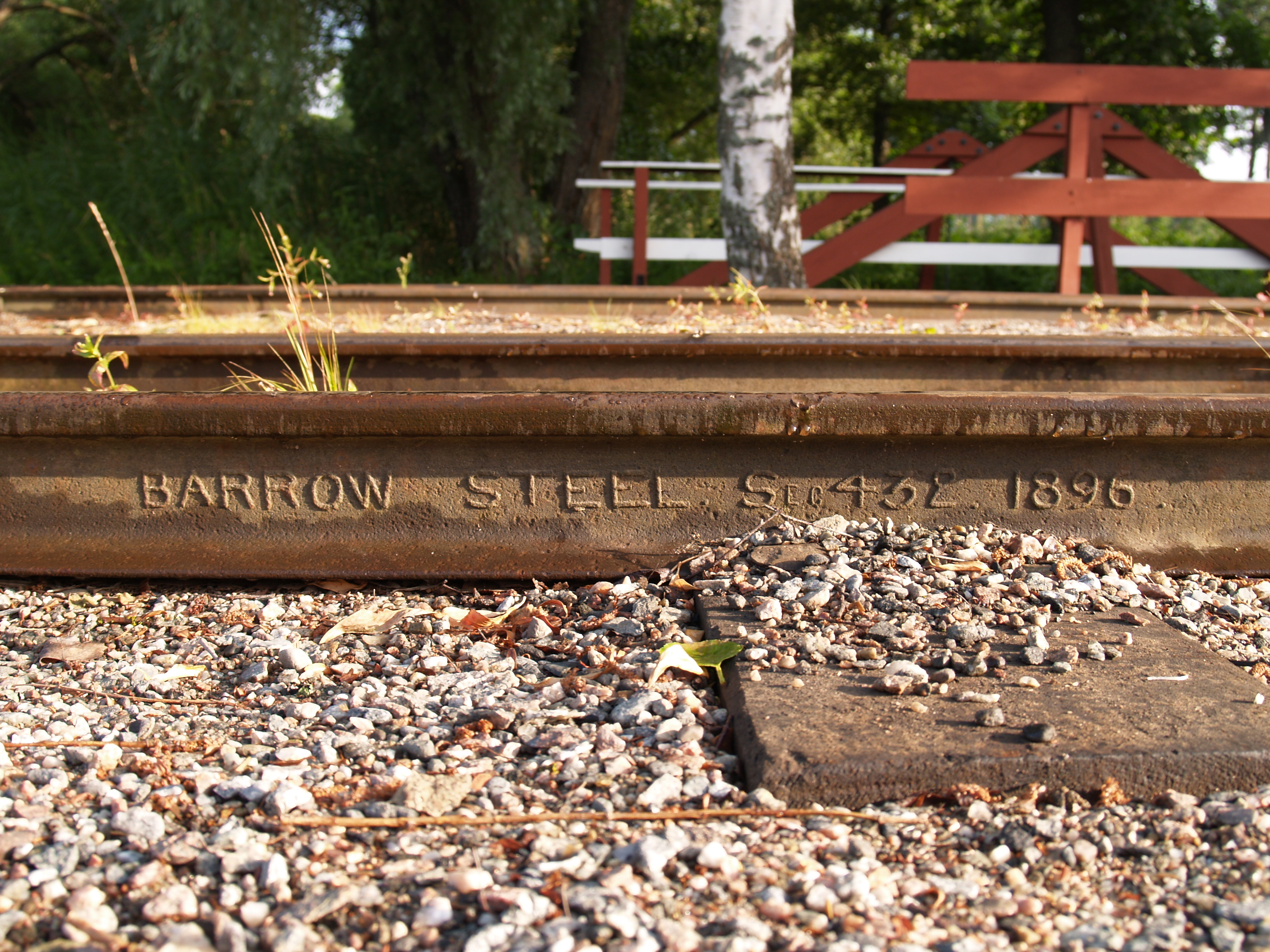
A railway in Mariefred (Sweden) constructed with 'Barrow Steel' dated 1896

The Barrow Hematite Steel Company Limited was a major iron and steel producer based in Barrow-in-Furness, Lancashire (now Cumbria), England, between 1859 and 1963. At the start of the 20th century and the Technological Revolution it operated the largest steel mill in the world.

== History ==
Iron prospector Henry Schneider arrived in Furness in 1839 and, with other investors, opened the Furness Railway in 1846 to transport iron ore and slate from local mines to the coast. In 1850 extensive hematite deposits were discovered of sufficient size to develop factories for smelting and exporting steel. Schneider Hannay & Co. was founded in 1859 and was renamed the Barrow Hematite Steel Company in 1865. Officially registered on 1 April 1864, Sir James Ramsden acted as Managing Director and Josiah T. Smith became General Manager of the Barrow Hematite Steel Company. The Hindpool iron and steelworks were expanded to include ten blast furnaces and 18, 5-ton Bessemer converters by 1866, which were physically separated by the Furness Railway.

The steelworks continued to operate during World War II where, alongside the booming shipyard, they were a prime enemy target during the Blitz. In the post war period, Barrow developed the 'continuous casting' methods of steelmaking. The company continued to operate under the Barrow Hematite Steel name until 1947, when it was again renamed Barrow Ironworks Limited. During the mid 1960s, the works were absorbed by British Steel Corporation. Barrow Ironworks Limited, the associated factory buildings and mines ceased operation in 1963, when all hematite deposits in the area were exhausted, ultimately sealing the fate of the town's century long iron and steel making industry. Barrow Steelworks Ltd continued operations until final closure in the 1980s

Although the Barrow Hematite Steel Company exported its products to all corners of the world including for major railway projects, steel was utilised in Barrow itself in the form of shipbuilding. Vickers Shipbuilding and Engineering (now BAE Systems) was and still remains one of the UK's largest shipbuilding centres, and the only one to build Royal Navy submarines.

== Legacy ==
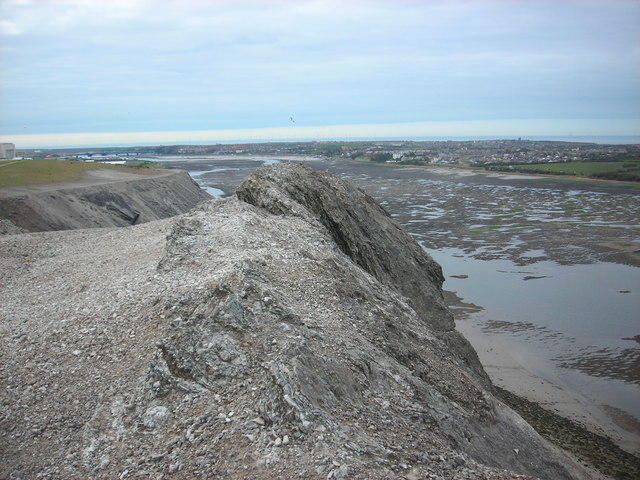
A section of the large slag heap in Ormsgill pictured in 2007

Steel produced at the works was used throughout the 20th century by VSEL to construct hundreds of vessels, many of which supported the British war efforts in World War I and II. Steel rails were however the works' signature product and were laid for railways in Australia, Canada, Germany, India, Ireland, Japan, Rhodesia, South Africa, South America, and the United States.

Only the main entrance arch remains. It was re-constructed in a different part of the works in 1987, and is currently occupied by Stagecoach Buses. The rest of the site is now being occupied by a number of industrial parks and the campus of Furness College. Despite this, Barrow's infamous 'Slag bank' is a lasting reminder of the town's industrial past. The slag bank contains over a century's worth of waste from the iron and steelworks which was dumped in north Hindpool, adjacent to Walney Channel. Since the 1990s, an ongoing scheme has been reclaiming the derelict and contaminated land by laying soil on top of the heap.

There are three sculptures in Barrow commemorating the iron and steelworks, the largest of which resembles a large book describing the history of the works on Duke Street. Two sculptures of steelworkers can be found at the centre of Dalton Road and 'Red Man's Way' - a coastal path alongside the Walney Channel.

== See also ==
- History of Barrow-in-Furness
- Barrow Jute Works
- Barrow Colliery
