= Majestic Hotel, Barrow-in-Furness =

Hotel in Barrow-in-Furness, Cumbria, England

Coordinates: 54.1108°N 3.2270°W

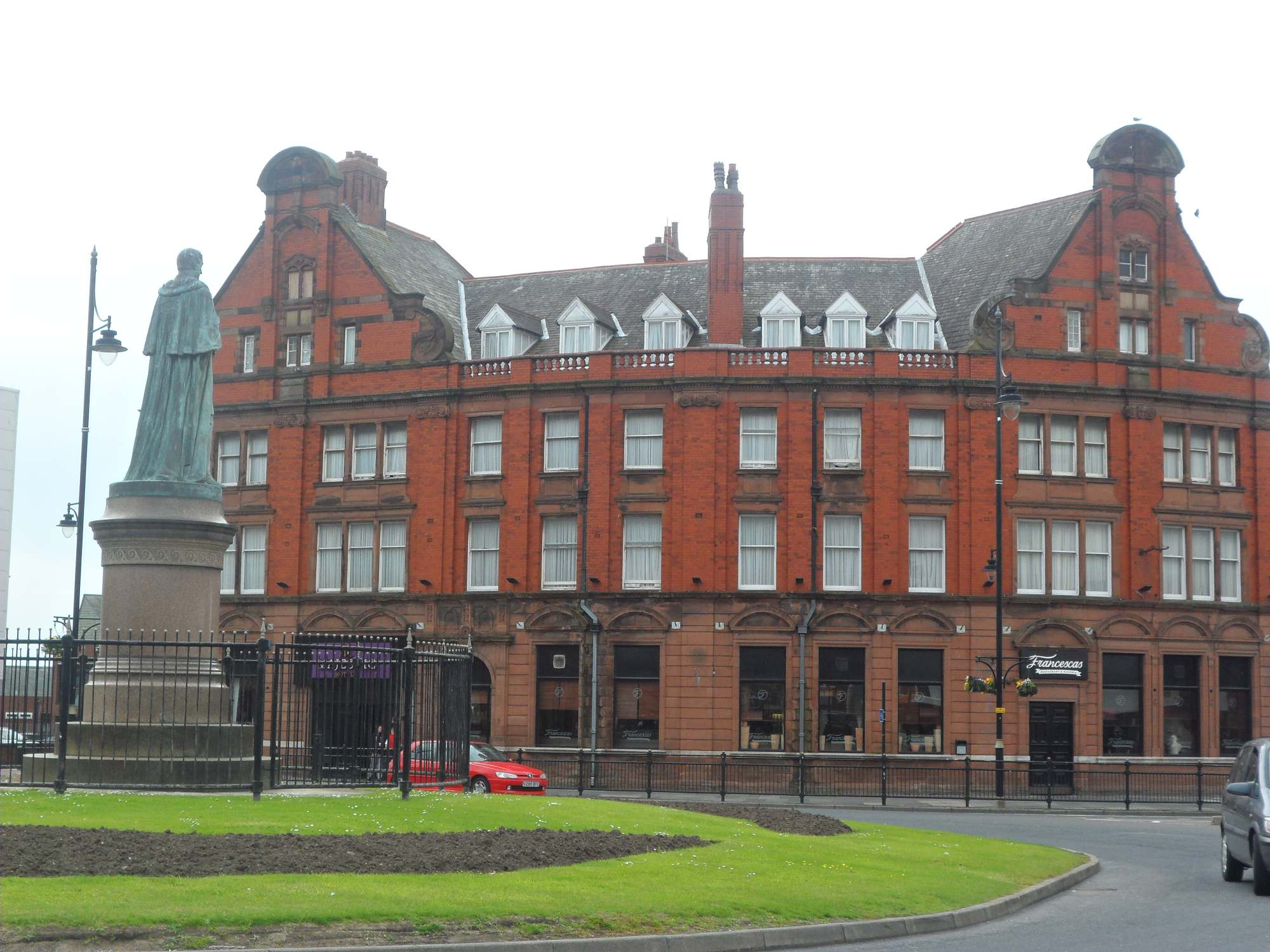

The Majestic Hotel (formerly Hotel Majestic) located at Schneider Square in Barrow-in-Furness, Cumbria, England is a 3-star Grade II listed hotel constructed in 1904. The building was designed by JY McIntosh and contains elements of Edwardian and Jacobean architecture. It is also noted for its striking rounded Flemish gables. £1.7 million was spent on refurbishing the hotel in 2008 by developers One Leisure, although ownership of the Majestic, and its nearby sister hotel the Imperial, have since been transferred. The majority of the building's ground floor level is occupied by an Italian restaurant named Francesca's.

== See also ==
- Listed buildings in Barrow-in-Furness
