= Barrow-in-Furness Town Hall =

Municipal building in Barrow-in-Furness, Cumbria, England

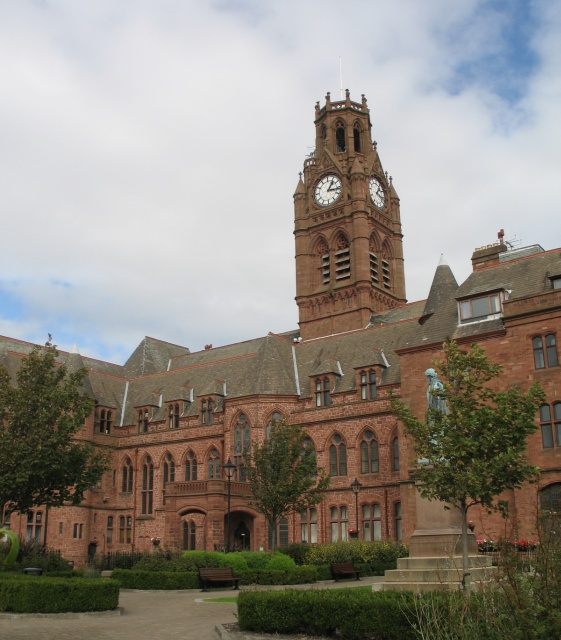
- Interactive map of the Barrow-in-Furness Town Hall area

General information
- Type: Town hall
- Architectural style: Gothic Revival style
- Classification

Listed Building – Grade II*
- Designated: 6 May 1976
- Reference no.: 1197859
- Location: Barrow-in-Furness, England, Duke Street; BARROW-IN-FURNESS; LA14 2LD
- Coordinates: 54.1115°N 3.2279°W
- Current tenants: Westmorland and Furness Council
- Construction started: 1882
- Completed: 1886
- Inaugurated: 14 July 1887
- Cost: £80,000 (£9.2M as of 2017)
- Owner: Westmorland and Furness Council

Height
- Height: 50 metres (164 ft)

Dimensions
- Diameter: 72 metres (236 ft)

Technical details
- Floor count: 4 (6 in tower)

Design and construction
- Architect: William Henry Lynn
- Architecture firm: Lanyon, Lynn and Lanyon
- Main contractor: Short and Devlin

Barrow-in-Furness Town Hall is a Gothic Revival style municipal building in Barrow-in-Furness, Cumbria, England. The building, which served as the headquarters of the former Barrow Borough Council, and now one of the bases of Westmorland and Furness Council, lies within a Conservation Area with Grade II* listed status.

== History ==
In the mid-19th century, Barrow was little more than a small fishing village. However, after the discovery of iron ore in local mountains and the establishment of a port in the town, the area became a municipal borough in 1867. In 1877, architects were invited to submit proposals for a large civic building in Barrow which would represent the growth and current stature of the town. Irish-born architect, William Henry Lynn had the winning design that began construction in 1882. The building was constructed almost entirely from local Hawcoat sandstone with Westmorland slate for the roof. At 50 metres (164 ft) tall, it became one of the tallest buildings in Barrow.

Financial constraints alongside changes to the design were the reason that construction did not commence immediately after selection of the design. In 1885, the building was almost complete, however cracks were found in areas of the building and the clock tower had to be completely demolished and rebuilt. This was most likely the result of the contractors trying to cut costs by using sub-standard stone. Despite these initial troubles, the town hall was finally complete in 1886 and was officially opened on 14 July 1887 by Spencer Cavendish, 8th Duke of Devonshire to coincide with the Golden Jubilee of Queen Victoria.

The town hall continued to serve as the headquarters of the municipal borough council for much of the 20th century and remained a meeting place for the enlarged Barrow-in-Furness Borough Council which was formed in 1974. Upon abolition of the Borough of Barrow-in-Furness on 1 April 2023, the town hall became one of three anchor buildings of the new Westmorland and Furness Council.

== Architecture ==
=== External ===
The English Heritage listing of Barrow Town Hall describes the external architecture as: Snecked red sandstone with ashlar dressings, graduated slate roofs. 3 storeys and attic with 6-stage tower; 1:1:5:2:4:1:1 bays in near symmetrical composition. Bays 2 & 14 have oriel bay windows corbelled over ground floor; the 2-bay section is occupied by the tower. Gothic Revival style with Geometrical tracery.

=== Internal ===
The ground floor entrance hall consists of a reception and information desk alongside photos of Elizabeth II and The Duke of Edinburgh who visited the town hall in 1956. There is also a plaque commemorating the centenary of the Borough of Barrow-in-Furness which was unveiled in 1967 by The Princess Margaret, Countess of Snowdon. The largest room within the town hall is the Queen's Hall. A number of stained glass panels have been added to windows in the Queen's Hall that feature local dignitaries and aspects of Barrow's shipbuilding and steelworks industries. Also on the first floor are the Council Chambers, the former Press and Public Galleries, the Drawing Room, the Ante Room and a large public Banquet Hall. Works of art in the town hall include portraits depicting the 7th Duke of Devonshire and Lord Frederick Cavendish. The clock and bells were manufactured by Gillett & Co. of Croydon.

== Plazas ==
The town hall's main plaza is to the exterior of the building, which has led to many incorrectly believing that the building was built 'back to front'. Two large plazas are situated either side of the town hall. They are often focal points for mass local celebrations and events, examples being Barrow A.F.C. and Barrow Raiders victories as well as the annual Christmas lights switch-on. Town Square, originally known as Cavendish Square, to the north is framed by the town hall itself and the Forum, until the turn of the 21st century vehicular traffic ran through Town Square until it was entirely pedestrianised. The rear of the town hall is landscaped and includes the statue of Lord Frederick Cavendish which was originally in the centre of Town Square.

== Gallery ==
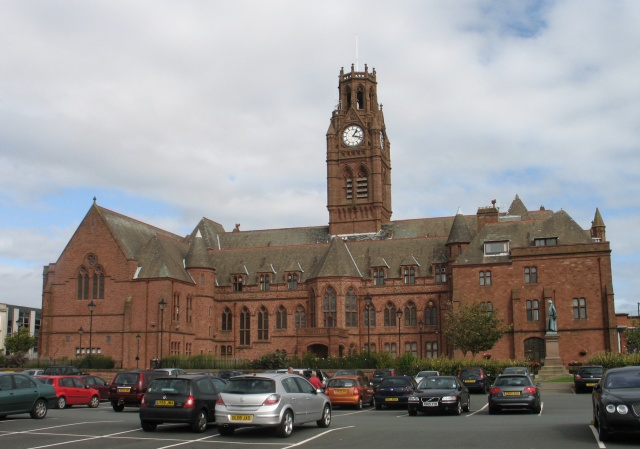
The back of the town hall and tower

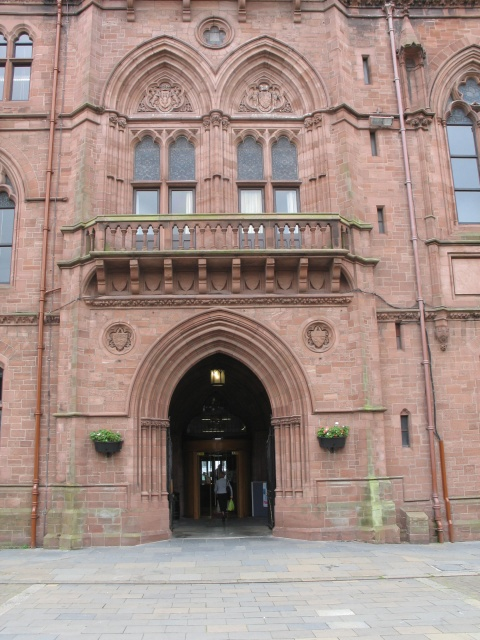
Main entrance to the town hall

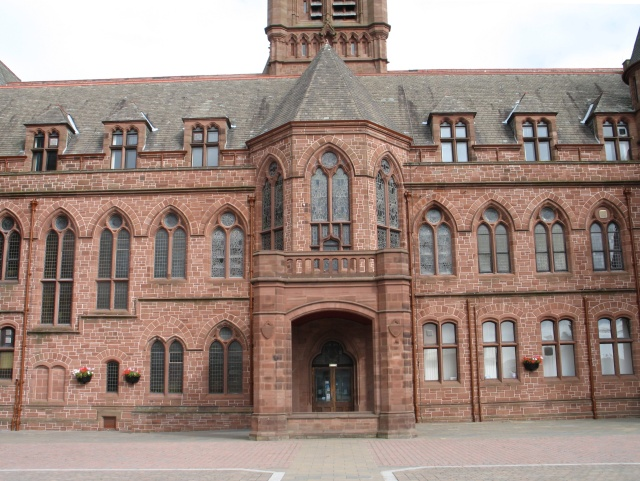
Rear entrance to the town hall

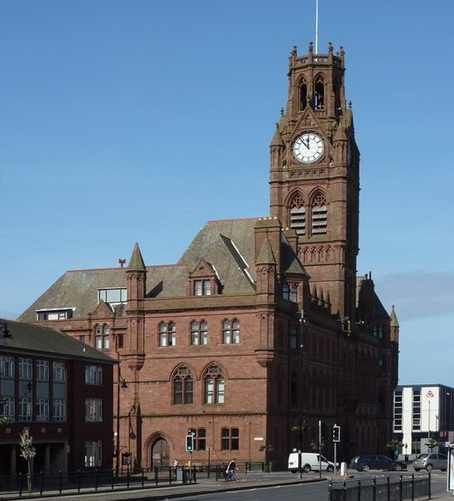
South facade seen from Schneider Square

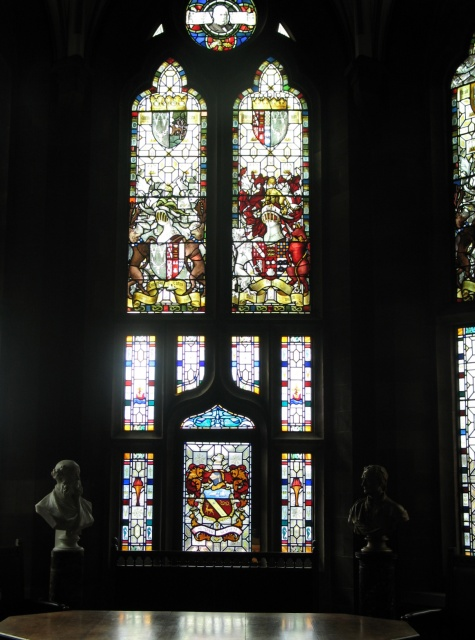
Stained glass window bearing local coat of arms

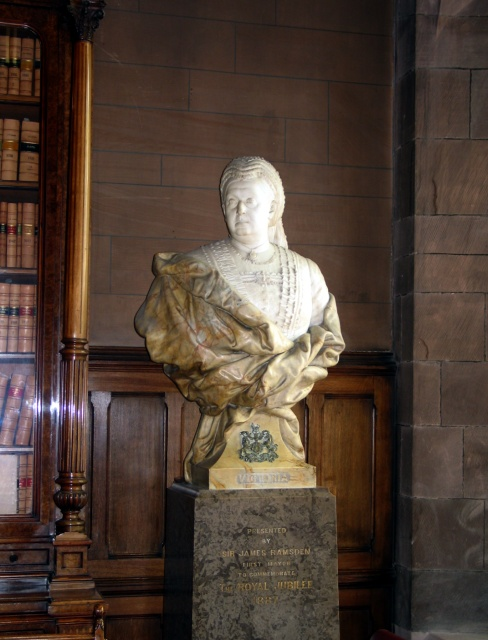
Bust of Queen Victoria inside the town hall

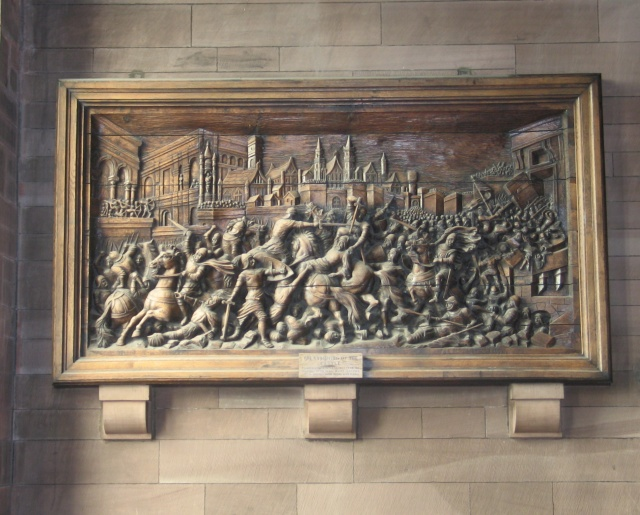
Carving of a battle scene inside the town hall

== See also ==
- Listed buildings in Barrow-in-Furness
- List of city and town halls in England
