= St. George's Square, Barrow-in-Furness =

Square in Barrow-in-Furness, Cumbria, England

Coordinates: 54.108°N 3.221°W

St. George's Square, in Barrow-in-Furness, Cumbria, England is a public space that acted as the centre of the town during the late 19th century. The square now lies in the southernmost fringes of the Central ward close to the Port of Barrow.

== Background ==
St. George's Square is a conservation area and is flanked by a number of listed buildings. Amongst the most notable buildings located in St. George's Square are the former headquarters of the Furness Railway and Barrow's first permanent train station which were completed in 1863, however this was replaced by Barrow Central Station a mere 20 years later. The associated structures are adjacent to the square along The Strand currently in a state of disuse. Amongst the other firsts for the town located in St. George's Square were the Lancaster Bank and Harbour Hotel Public House. Despite these buildings still standing, they have long served a different purpose (predominantly residential), as the town centre expanded northwards where land was more abundant.

== North Lonsdale Hospital ==
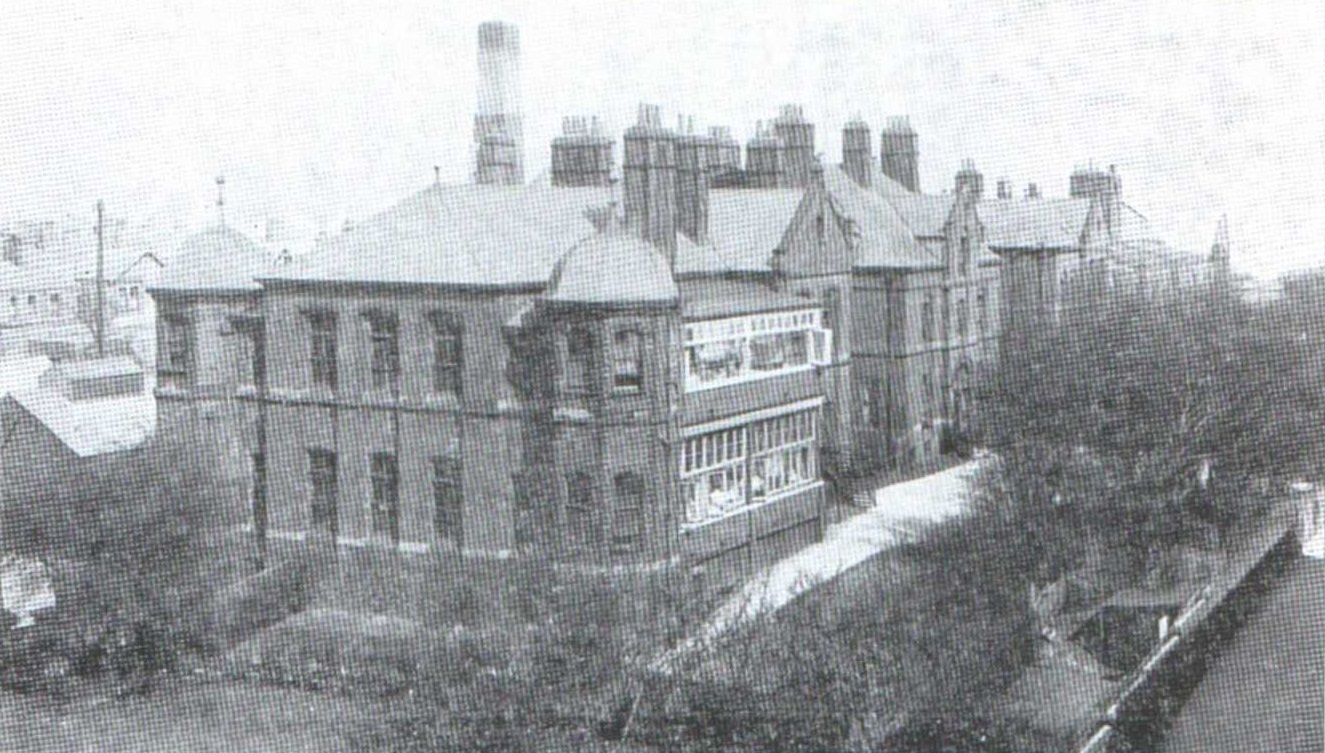
North Lonsdale Hospital pictured in the early 20th century

Barrow's first hospital located close to St. George's Square was completed in 1866; however, the town's rapid and sudden growth meant that the tiny St. George's Hospital, with only a handful of beds, soon became redundant. A new much larger hospital named North Lonsdale Hospital was constructed on the northern corner of St. George's Square. Design by local architects Paley and Austin the building was built between 1885 and 1887, with another wing added in 1899. North Lonsdale served as the town's primary hospital for almost a century, with no less than seven wards including dozens of beds, an operating theatre, dispensary and laundry. Other hospitals in the town during the 20th century were located in Roose, Risedale and Devonshire Road, the latter two specialising in maternity and infectious diseases respectively. North Lonsdale Hospital finally closed down in 1989 after all services had been transferred to the modern Furness General Hospital off Abbey Road. Despite its listed status the entire complex was demolished in the mid-1990s to make way for a retirement home. Planning permission was approved in 2013 for housing units to be constructed on the remainder of the site.

== St. George's Church ==
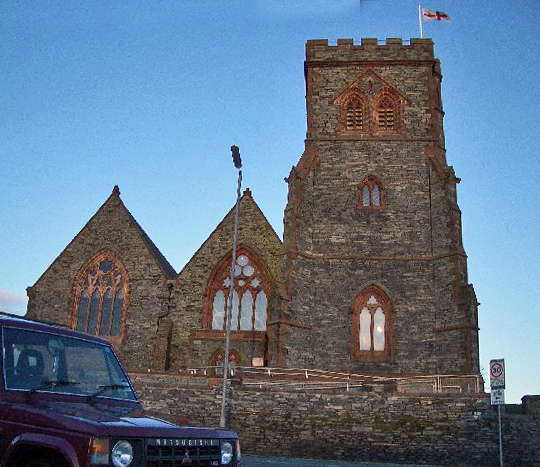
St. George's Church located in the square

St. George's Church is a focal point of the square and the oldest active Anglican parish church in Barrow. It was constructed between 1859 and 1861 and still to this day remains one of the town's largest places of worship with a capacity of 1,000.

== Listed Buildings ==
The following list includes listed buildings in St. George's Square, and excludes those on nearby School Street which forms a continuous conservation area with St. George's Square.

- 1 St. Georges Square/Former Lancaster Banking Company (Grade II)
- Harbour Hotel (Grade II)
- Railwaymen's Club/Former Furness Railway Headquarters and Station (Grade II)
- St. George's Church (Grade II)
- St. George's House/Former Vicarage

== See also ==
- Listed buildings in Barrow-in-Furness
