= James Ramsden (industrialist) =

British mechanical engineer, industrialist and civic leader

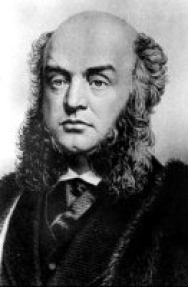
Sir James Ramsden

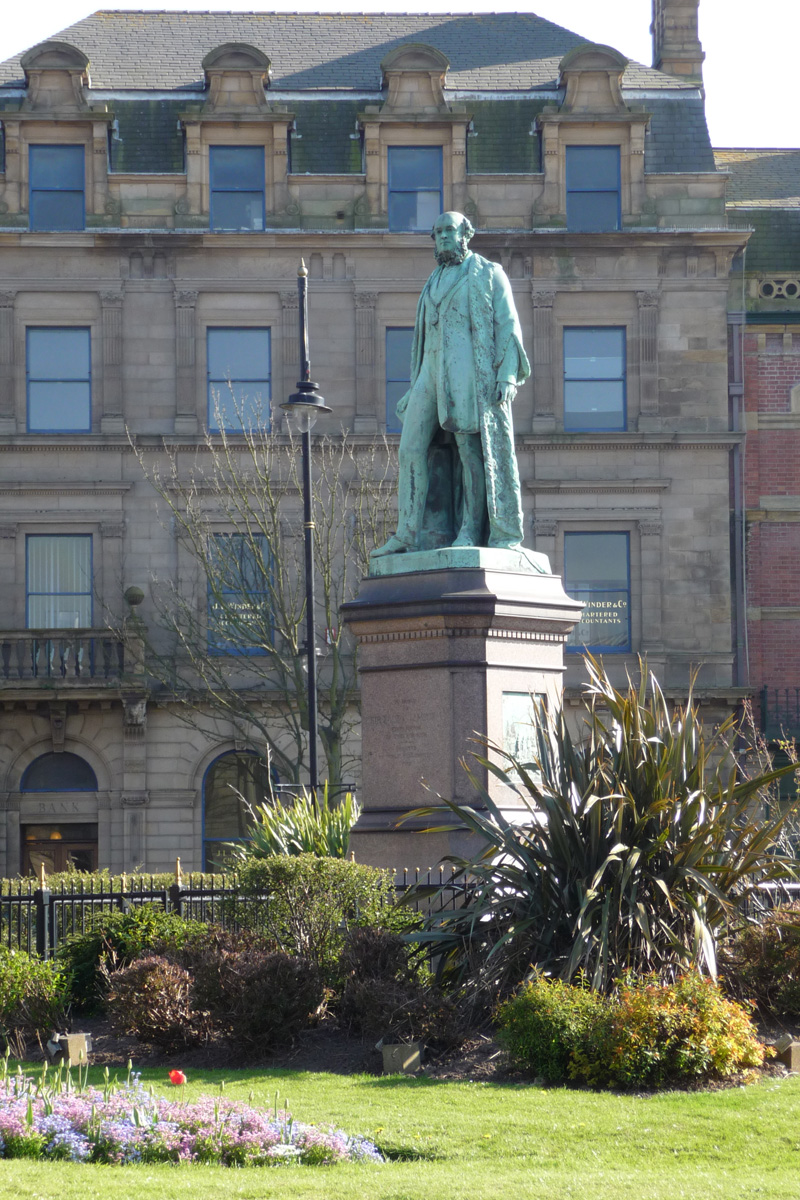
The statue of Sir James Ramsden in Ramsden Square, Barrow-in-Furness

Sir James Ramsden (25 February 1822 – 19 October 1896) was a British mechanical engineer, industrialist, and civic leader, who played a dominant role in the development of the new town of Barrow-in-Furness, in the historic county of Lancashire. He served five successive terms as mayor on its first achieving municipal borough status, from 1867 onwards.

== Biography ==
James Ramsden was most probably born in Bolton, Lancashire (although the census records are inconsistent on this point). (Note: The census returns for 1851–71 show James Ramsden's birthplace as Bolton. The 1881 and 1891 returns state Liverpool, where the Ramsden family subsequently lived, and where Ramsden's widowed mother Jane (nee Grandage) featured in the 1841 census as the keeper of a tavern in Vulcan Street. Liverpool was also suggested in at least one obituary notice (Institute of Civil Engineers, Minutes of Proceedings, vol. 129, 1896–97, p. 385). However the Bolton-le-Moors parish register includes baptismal entries for James Ramsden (son of William & Jane Ramsden, Little Bolton, millwright) on 31 March 1822, and for at least two of his siblings (Mary Ramsden, 1820; Ellen Ramsden, 1824).) James Ramsden was one of several children of William Ramsden, an engineer. He served an apprenticeship with the Liverpool firm of Bury, Curtis, and Kennedy before becoming locomotive superintendent for the new Furness Railway Company in January 1846. He very soon rose to become company secretary, and later served as managing director between 1866 and 1895.

Along with Capt. L. Barstow, RN, Inspecting Commander of Coastguard, Ramsden was instrumental in the creation of Barrow Lifeboat Station on Roa Island, both having made a request to the Royal National Lifeboat Institution in 1864. He was appointed Honorary Secretary of Barrow lifeboat in 1865.

In 1866, Ramsden was also appointed managing director of the Barrow Hematite Steel Company, Limited, and from 1875 to 1888 took the same role at The Barrow Shipbuilding Company.

Ramsden's home was Abbots Wood, a large new mansion on the outskirts of the town, rented from the railway company. From here, he took an active interest in virtually all local developments, including the early Barrow Shipbuilding Company; the new Port of Barrow, and the massively expanded iron and steel industries. He was also a notable benefactor, contributing towards many new social and civic facilities within the town.

Ramsden was knighted in 1872, and a statue by Matthew Noble was unveiled that same year in what was to become Ramsden Square, Barrow-in-Furness. A portrait of Ramsden hangs in the borough's town hall. However, he remained a largely local figure, declining calls to stand for Parliament in 1885 when the borough was seeking its first Member of Parliament. He served as High Sheriff of Lancashire from 1873-1874.

While shooting with Schneider at Oak Lea, Ramsden shot Frank Ainslie "pretty badly but not dangerously.

Ramsden was married in 1853 to Hannah Mary Edwards from Wallasey, Cheshire. Their only child Frederic James Ramsden (1859–1941) also served as superintendent of the Furness Railway.

Sir James Ramsden died in 1896 and was buried at Barrow Cemetery.

== Notes and references ==
Notes
