= St Mary's Church, Dalton-in-Furness =

Coordinates: 54.1549°N 3.1870°W

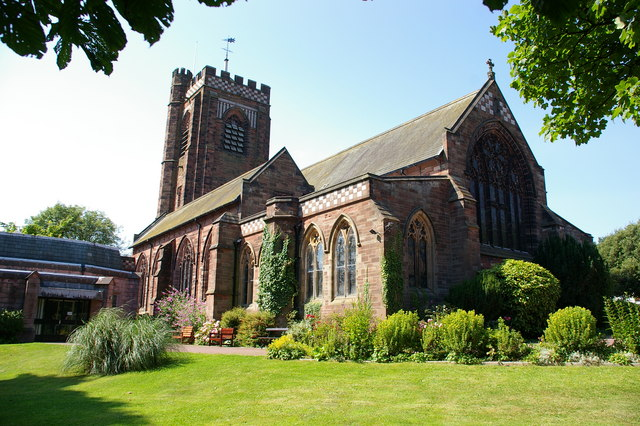
- St Mary's Church, Dalton-in-Furness, from the southeast

- Location in Cumbria
- OS grid reference: SD 226,739
- Location: Dalton-in-Furness, Cumbria
- Country: England
- Denomination: Anglican

History
- Status: Parish church

Architecture
- Functional status: Active
- Heritage designation: Grade II*
- Designated: 25 February 1950
- Architect: Paley and Austin
- Architectural type: Church
- Style: Gothic Revival
- Groundbreaking: 1883
- Completed: 1885
- Construction cost: £11,553

Specifications
- Materials: Sandstone, green slate roofs

Administration
- Province: York
- Diocese: Carlisle
- Archdeaconry: Westmorland and Furness
- Deanery: Furness
- Parish: Dalton-in-Furness and Ireleth-with-Askham

Clergy
- Vicar: Revd. Tom Sample

St Mary's Church is in the town of Dalton-in-Furness, Cumbria, England. It is an active Anglican parish church in the deanery of Furness, the archdeaconry of Westmorland and Furness, and the diocese of Carlisle. Its benefice has been combined with that of St Peter, Ireleth-with-Askam. The church is recorded in the National Heritage List for England as a designated Grade II* listed building. It stands in an elevated position near Dalton Castle.

== History ==
The earliest evidence of a church on the site is in 1138. The present church was built in 1884–85 to a design by the Lancaster partnership of Paley and Austin. It cost £11,550 (equivalent to £1,280,000 in 2025). Half of this was donated by benefactors, namely the Duke of Devonshire who gave £2,500, and the Duke of Buccleuch, the industrialist Henry Schneider, and the Barrow Hematite Steel Company who each gave £1,000. The church provided seating for about 700 people, replacing an earlier church built on the site in 1825–26 and 1830 designed by George Webster and built by James Garden. Webster's east window was reused in the north aisle of the new church. In 1979–80 a parish centre was built adjacent to the church and linked to it by its south porch.

George Romney (painter) was buried here in 1802.

== Architecture ==
=== Exterior ===
The church is constructed in snecked red sandstone with ashlar dressings and green slate roofs. Its plan consists of a six-bay nave, north and south aisles under separate roofs, north and south porches, a two-bay chancel with a north vestry and a south chapel, and a west tower above the west end of the nave. Its architectural style is Decorated. The tower consists of three stages standing on a chamfered plinth. The nave west window is in the bottom stage of the tower and has three lights. The tower is supported by buttresses, contains three-light bell openings, and has an embattled parapet. At its southwest corner is an octagonal stair turret, rising to the greater height than the tower. There is chequerwork decoration on the parapets of the tower and south chapel, above the porches, and over the east and west windows. Along the south aisle are buttresses, and two pairs of four-light windows. The south porch is hexagonal, and the north porch is three-sided. The chancel has a six-light east window, above which is a slit window and a cross on the apex of the gable. On the south wall of the chapel is a semi-octagonal projection between two pairs of two-light windows; there is another two-light window in its east wall. In the north wall of the vestry is an ogee-headed doorway and a cross window; in its east wall is a two-light window.

=== Interior ===
The arcades are supported by octagonal piers. At the east end of the north aisle is a flying buttress. Most of the furnishings were designed by the architects. The reredos has alabaster panels surrounded by sandstone. The baptismal font dates from the medieval period. It is octagonal with a goblet-shaped bowl, and is carved with quatrefoils and shields. There are fragments of stained glass dating from the early 16th century in the north porch. On the north side of the church is a window from the earlier church, dated 1862, made by Heaton, Butler and Bayne and designed by Alfred Hassam (1842–1869). On the south side of the church is 20th-century glass by Shrigley and Hunt. The monuments include one from the older church dated 1821, and others date from the 18th century. The three-manual organ was built in 1905 by Ainscough, and restored in 1973 by Pendlebury. Further modification have subsequently been made. There is a ring of ten bells with a tenor weight of 21cwt 0qr 21 lbs (1104 kg) in D all cast in 1927 by John Taylor & Co. The bells are hung in a cast iron frame, also dated 1927. Bellringers practice on a Tuesday evening. At the west end of the nave is the baptismal font, taken from Furness Abbey.

== External features ==
In the churchyard is a slate graveslab standing on a limestone plinth to the memory of the artist George Romney, who was born in the village and died in 1802. It has been designated as a Grade II listed building.

== See also ==
- Grade II* listed buildings in Westmorland and Furness
- Listed buildings in Dalton Town with Newton
- List of works by George Webster
- List of ecclesiastical works by Paley and Austin
