= Dalton-in-Furness =

Town in Cumbria, England

Coordinates: 54.1544°N 3.1814°W

- Town
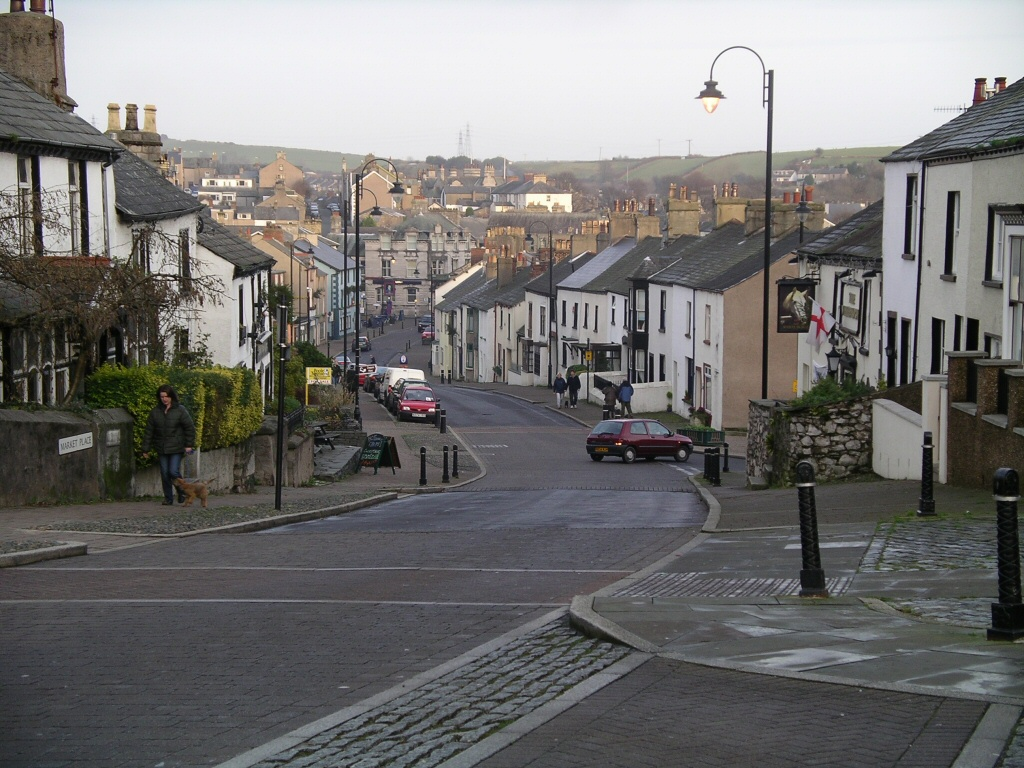
- Market Street, Dalton-in-Furness

- Location in the former Barrow-in-Furness Borough Location within Cumbria
- Area: 1.60 km^{2} (0.62 sq mi)
- Population: 7,827 (2011 Census)
  - Density: 4,892/km^{2} (12,670/sq mi)
- OS grid reference: SD228738
- Civil parish: Dalton Town with Newton
- Unitary authority: Westmorland and Furness
- Ceremonial county: Cumbria
- Region: North West
- Country: England
- Sovereign state: United Kingdom
- Post town: Dalton-in-Furness
- Postcode district: LA15
- Dialling code: 01229
- Police: Cumbria
- Fire: Cumbria
- Ambulance: North West
- UK Parliament: Barrow and Furness

Dalton-in-Furness is a town in the Westmorland and Furness district, in Cumbria, England, 4 miles (6 km) north east of Barrow-in-Furness. Along with the rest of the Furness peninsula, it was historically part of Lancashire. It is in the parish of Dalton Town with Newton, alongside the nearby hamlet of Newton-in-Furness. In 2011 it had a population of 7,827.

== History ==
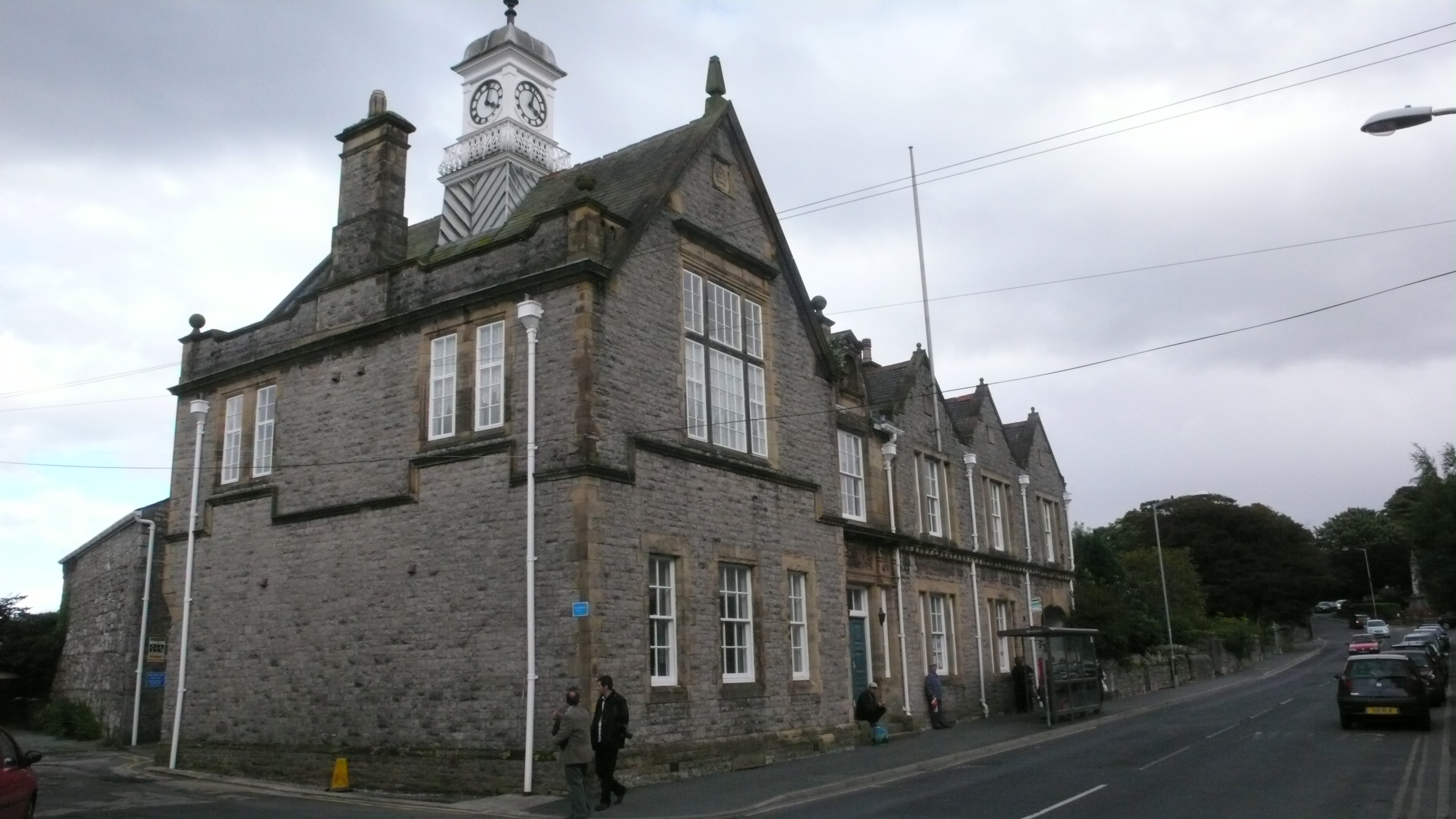
Dalton Town Hall

The name Dalton derives from the Old English dǣltūn meaning 'settlement in a valley'.

Dalton is mentioned in the Domesday Book of 1086, written as "Daltune", as one of the townships forming the Manor of Hougun held by Tostig Godwinson, Earl of Northumbria. Historically, it was the capital of Furness. The ancient parish of Dalton covered the area which was occupied by the borough of Barrow-in-Furness from 1974 to 2023. Historically a part of Lancashire, the town is associated with a number of famous artists, including George Romney. Dalton Town Hall was completed in 1884.

In 1961 the parish had a population of 10,316. The parish was abolished on 1 April 1974, when it became part of the Barrow-in-Furness district. On 1 April 1987, the new parish of Dalton Town with Newton was created.

The Drill Hall was officially opened in July 1929 as a Regular Army Centre for military training, and was used as a military headquarters in the years leading up to the war in 1939. During the war years (1939-1945) it was a centre for the Home Guard. It had a rifle range until 2009. After the war it was a Territorial and Army Cadet Headquarters. In addition the Drill hall was used as an annexe to Nelson Street Junior School. Since the early 1990s it has been used as a community and youth centre.

== Geography ==
The town is situated near the centre of Low Furness, on the eastern crest of a glaciated valley which runs obliquely across the peninsula. Just over a mile to the south lie the ruins of Furness Abbey, and four miles to the south west is the nearest major town, Barrow-in-Furness. The area is generally reached by the A590, the link road from the M6 motorway to the Furness region, which now by-passes the town, reducing the traffic flow, and enabling traffic calming measures which have proved to be rather controversial.

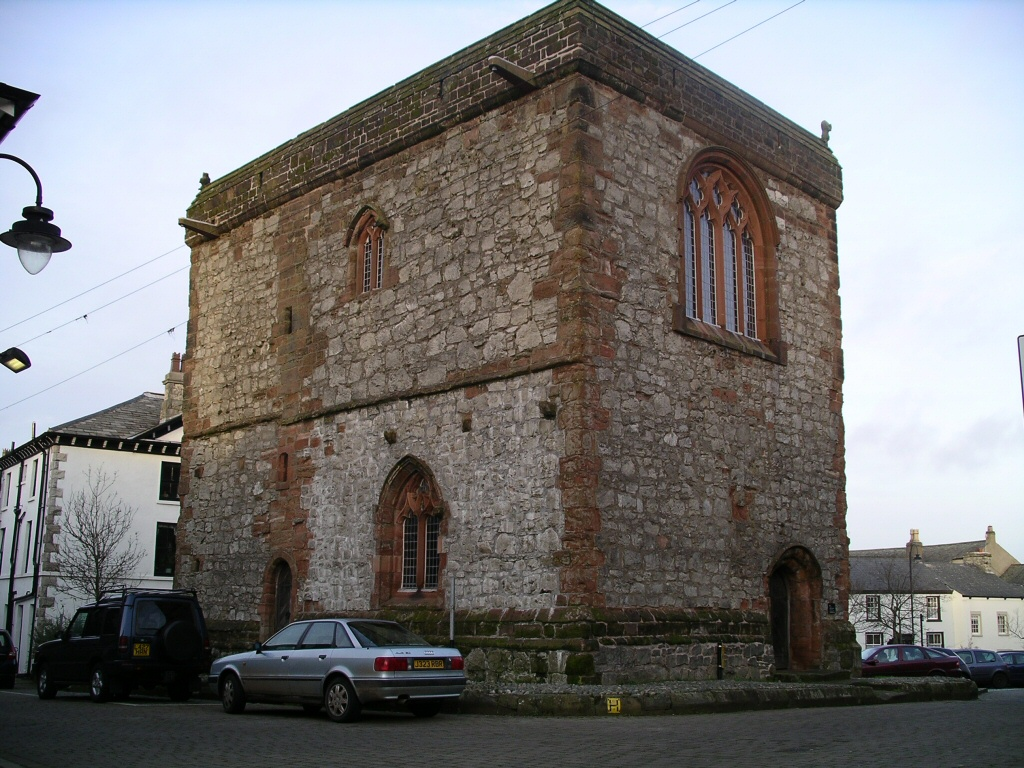
Dalton Castle, Dalton-in-Furness

Dalton with Newton Town Council was the first corporate member of the Friends of Real Lancashire, an organisation dedicated to recognising the traditional county boundaries of Lancashire.

== Transport ==
Dalton railway station, which serves the town, is located on the Furness Line, giving connections to Barrow, Ulverston, Grange-over-Sands and Lancaster. There are longer distance services to Preston and Manchester.

Local buses are operated by Stagecoach Cumbria & North Lancashire with routes to Barrow, Ulverston, Windermere and Kendal.

== Sport ==
The local football teams Dalton United and Crooklands Casuals (also known as the Orangemen) play in the West Lancashire Football League.

Girls' and women's football in the town is provided by Dalton Girls and Ladies F.C. who have junior and open age teams competing in a various Cumbrian leagues.

There is also a 2 junior football clubs, Crooklands Casuals boast the larger set up with teams from under 8s through to under 16s whilst, Dalton Junior F.C. provide mini league football (under 8s, under 9s and under 10s); Dalton JFC currently plays on Dowdales School fields.

Dalton Rugby League Football Club is located at the entrance to the town on Crooklands Brow. Currently in the first division of the North West Counties League. Their ground was recently renamed Kelland Park, in memory of Dalton rugby league stalwart, Ivor Kelland.

Dalton Cricket Club plays in the North Lancs. & Cumbria Cricket League. Dalton won the first organized cricket match played in Furness, beating Barrow. The Cricket Club also has many junior sides, such as The Under 11's & Under 13's. It also now has a table tennis club, located at the Seventh Day Adventist Church .

== Education ==
Dowdales School is the town's secondary school with approximately 1,050 pupils. The school does not have a sixth form, but pupils transfer either to the Sixth Form College in Barrow, or to Barrow and Kendal Colleges of Further Education.

There are four primary schools in the town, Chapel Street School, George Romney Junior School, Dalton St Mary's Church of England Primary School and Our Lady of The Rosary Catholic School.

== Media ==
Regional TV news comes from Salford-based BBC North West and ITV Granada. Television signals are received from the Winter Hill and the local relay transmitters.

Local radio stations are BBC Radio Cumbria, Heart North West, and Cando FM, a community-based station.

The town's local newspaper is the North West Evening Mail.

== Attractions ==
In addition to being a quarter hour's journey from the boundary of the Lake District National Park, Dalton has a number of tourist attractions within its own borders, including:

- Dalton Castle (National Trust)

== Twin towns ==
Dalton is twinned with Dalton, Pennsylvania, United States.

== Notable residents ==
In 1614 Margaret Fell (also known as Margaret Fox), founder of the Religious Society of Friends (Quakers), was born in Dalton with the birth name Askew. Known popularly as the "mother of Quakerism," she is considered one of the Valiant Sixty early Quaker preachers and missionaries. She died on 23 April 1702 at age 87 or 88.

Dalton was the birthplace and early home of George Romney in the 1700s, as well as Miles Romney in the early 1800s, the latter of whom is a direct ancestor of U.S. politician and former presidential candidate Mitt Romney.

William Ashburner (1737–1793), from Dalton-in-Furness, became the ancestor of a noted family of merchants and administrators in British-ruled India during company rule, the Ashburner family.

Steve Dixon, Sky News presenter, was born in Newton-in-Furness, as was Richard T. Slone (b. 23 January 1974), an award-winning artist. Both were in the same year at school and were educated firstly in Newton and then in Dalton-in-Furness. Turner Prize winner Keith Tyson (b. 23 August 1969) grew up and attended school here as well.

E.B. Ford, an eminent scientist and author of the very popular New Naturalist book on butterflies, was born in Dalton in April 1901.

Tommy Johnson, a footballer and the third highest goal scorer for Manchester City, was born in Queen Street, Dalton in Furness, in 1901. He made five appearances for England’s national team scoring in each game.

== See also ==
- Listed buildings in Dalton Town with Newton
