= Listed buildings in Dalton Town with Newton =

Dalton Town with Newton is a civil parish in Westmorland and Furness in Cumbria, England. The parish contains the market town of Dalton-in-Furness, the hamlet of Newton and surrounding countryside. The civil parish contains 70 listed buildings that are recorded in the National Heritage List for England. Of these, one is listed at Grade I, the highest of the three grades, two are at Grade II*, the middle grade, and the others are at Grade II, the lowest grade. Most of the listed buildings are houses and shops in or near the centre of the town. The oldest listed building is Dalton Castle, a free-standing tower in the centre of the town. Other listed buildings include a country house and associated structures, a farm and farm buildings, public houses, churches, a lime kiln, a pinfold, a market cross, public buildings, schools, a bank, and a war memorial.

== Key ==
Grade	Criteria
I	Buildings of exceptional interest, sometimes considered to be internationally important
II*	Particularly important buildings of more than special interest
II	Buildings of national importance and special interest

== Buildings ==
Name and location	Photograph	Date	Notes	Grade
Dalton Castle; 54.15542°N 3.18647°W		Mid 14th century	A free-standing rectangular tower in limestone with sandstone dressings, on a chamfered plinth, with large quoins, and a slate roof. It is thought to have been built as a courthouse and bailiff's residence. It was remodelled in about 1704, and in 1856 it was converted into a Masonic lodge by E. G. Paley for the 5th Duke of Buccleuch. The roof was replaced in 1907, and in 1965 it was given to the National Trust. In the south wall there is a large doorway and a four-light window, the west wall has a smaller doorway, arrow slits, and two two-light windows, on the north side are two two-light windows, one square-headed and the other with a pointed head, and the east side contains a small square-headed window, a blocked mullioned window and, at a higher level, two two-light windows with pointed heads. At the top of the tower is a parapet with slits, a gargoyle, and on the corners are eroded figures. The tower is also a scheduled monument.	I
2 Skelgate; 54.15590°N 3.18713°W	—	Early 17th century	A small house with a cruck-framed core that was extended in the early 19th century. It is pebbledashed and has a roof of slate and tile. There are two storeys and three bays, and a single-bay extension to the left that is taller and protrudes forward. The windows are sashes, and in the extension there is a square-headed vehicle entrance.	II
Elliscale Farmhouse; 54.16249°N 3.18769°W	—	17th century	The farmhouse was altered in the 19th century. It is in stuccoed stone with a slate roof. There are two storeys with an attic and three bays, a rear wing at the right, a three-storey stair projection, and a lean-to on the right. There is a conservatory in front of the central doorway, which has an ashlar surround and a cornice on consoles. The windows are sashes.	II
Red Lion Hotel; 54.15587°N 3.18507°W		Late 17th century	The public house was altered in the early 19th century. It is roughcast, and has two storeys, three bays, and a rear wing. In the ground floor is a square-headed carriage entrance to the left and a square-headed doorway. The windows in the left bay are sashes, and in the other two bays they are casements.	II
Oakdene; 54.15544°N 3.18592°W	—	1683	This originated as the Ship Hotel, and has been converted into a house and a cottage. It is pebbledashed with a slate roof, and has two storeys, three bays, and a rear wing. The windows are 20th-century casements, and there is a square-headed opening, above which is a datestone with a carved horseshoe.	II
3 Market Street; 54.15583°N 3.18527°W	—	Late 17th to early 18th century	A roughcast stone house with a roof of tile and slate, it has two storeys and two bays. The windows are casements, and to the left is a square-headed carriage entrance.	II
Tytup Hall; 54.17389°N 3.17225°W	—	c. 1713	A small country house with chamfered quoins, and a slate roof with coped gables and ball finials. There are two storeys with a cellar and attic, five bays, and a two-storey three-bay wing recessed at the left. Steps with railings lead up to a doorway that has a fanlight with an architrave and a segmental pediment. The windows are sashes, some in moulded architraves.	II*
6 Market Place and wall 54.15535°N 3.18609°W	—	Early 18th century	The house was altered in the early 19th century. It is pebbledashed with a roof of slate and tile. There are two storeys and an attic, four bays, and a rear wing. The doorway has Doric columns and a broken pediment. In the left bay is a passage opening, and the windows are sashes. Enclosing the front garden is a limestone wall, dwarf in the centre with railings, and higher at the sides with coping and returning to join the house. The wall contains two square gate piers.	II
22, 24 and 26 Market Street; 54.15588°N 3.18415°W	—	Early 18th century	Originally one house, then three cottages, and later two houses, the buildings are roughcast with a slate roof. They have two storeys, and each current house has two bays. Nos. 22 and 24 have two doorways under a shared canopy on brackets, and casement windows. No. 26 on the left has one doorway with a canopy on brackets, and sash windows.	II
1 Skelgate; 54.15594°N 3.18667°W	—	Early 18th century (probable)	A small rendered house with a slate roof, two storeys, and two bays. The central doorway has a porch with a gabled hood on brackets. The windows in the ground floor are three-light casements, and in the upper floor they are sashes.	II
18 Market Place; 54.15580°N 3.18568°W	—	Mid 18th century	A rendered house with corner pilasters and a roof of slate and tile. It has two storeys and two bays. The doorway has a hood on shaped brackets, to the right is a casement window, and in the upper floor are two sash windows; all the windows have raised surrounds. At the rear is a tall stair window.	II
19, 19A and 19B Market Place; 54.15580°N 3.18560°W	—	Mid 18th century (probable)	Originally a house, then an inn, and later divided into three dwellings. It is roughcast over limestone with corner pilasters, and has a roof of tile and slate. There are two storeys with an attic, two bays, and a taller rear wing. The doorway has a shaped surround, to the right is a casement window, and to the left is a round-arched carriage entrance. The windows in the upper floor and attic are sashes.	II
Retaining wall, Tytup Hall; 54.17391°N 3.17190°W	—	18th century	The wall bounds the front garden to the east of the hall. It is in limestone with sandstone copings, about 2 metres (6 ft 7 in) high, and has an irregular plan, including quadrants.	II
18, 19 and 20 Tudor Square; 54.15715°N 3.17766°W	—	Mid to late 18th century	Originally a row of three houses, later shops, that are stuccoed over stone, and have roofs of slate and tile. Each shop has two storeys and two bays. No. 19 is probably the earliest, and is lower than the others, It has a doorway and a plate glass window in the ground floor, and casement windows above. No. 20 to the right has two shop windows flanked by doorways in the ground floor, and a sash window and a casement window above. No. 18 on the left has a shop window with an integral doorway and cornice, and sash windows in the upper floor.	II
Empire House; 54.15615°N 3.18311°W	—	Mid to late 18th century	A roughcast house on a rendered plinth with a slate roof. There are two storeys and two bays, with an additional bay to the left. The doorway has a stone surround and a cornice on shaped brackets, and the sash windows have projecting sills and moulded architraves.	II
1–5 Castle Street; 54.15574°N 3.18694°W	—	Late 18th century	A row of five stone cottages with slate roofs, partly pebbledashed and partly rendered, in two storeys. The windows are a mix of sashes and casements. Nos. 3, 4 and 5 have one bay each, and Nos. 1 and 2 have two bays. No. 5 has a doorway with an architrave, a fanlight, and a hood on brackets, Nos. 4 and 3 have bow windows in the ground floor, and No. 2 has a vehicle entrance. No. 1 is taller and later, and has a door with a sidelight.	II
16 Market Place; 54.15582°N 3.18598°W	—	Late 18th century	The house is stuccoed on stone, and has a slate roof, two storeys, and three bays. The doorway has a wooden architrave and a cornice on consoles, and the windows are sashes of varying sizes.	II
17 Market Place; 54.15580°N 3.18582°W	—	Late 18th century	A stuccoed house with a tile roof, in two storeys and three bays. The doorway has an architrave and a cornice on consoles, and there is a carriage entrance with a segmental arch in the left bay. The windows are sashes.	II
44 Market Street; 54.15608°N 3.18346°W	—	Late 18th century (probable)	A shop, roughcast over stone, with a slate roof, two storeys, and one bay. On the ground floor are a doorway and a 19th-century shop window with pilasters and a cornice, and in the upper floor is a sash window.	II
16 and 16A Tudor Square; 54.15724°N 3.17717°W	—	Late 18th century	Originally one house, later divided into two shops, the building is in stuccoed stone with a slate roof. There are two storeys with an attic, and three bays. In the ground floor is a passage entry, a shop front with a moulded sill, pilasters and a cornice. This is flanked by doors, and to the right is a window converted from a shop window. In the upper floor are casement windows.	II
Hill Rise; 54.15582°N 3.18540°W	—	Late 18th century (probable)	A roughcast house with a slate roof, in two storeys, with three bays and a rear wing. On the front is an open porch with a dentilled gable and a finial flanked by bay windows. The doorway has an architrave and a cornice on consoles. In the upper floor are sash windows with architraves.	II
Lime kiln 54.16219°N 3.17749°W	—	Late 18th century (probable)	The lime kiln has massive limestone walls and is built into a bank. It has quoins, splayed sides, and a round arch in a recessed centre.	II
Rose Cottage; 54.15523°N 3.18708°W	—	Late 18th century	A roughcast cottage with a slate roof, in two storeys and two bays. Above the door is a hood on iron brackets, and the windows are casements.	II
Gate piers and walls, Tytup Hall; 54.17323°N 3.17212°W	—	Late 18th century (probable)	The gate piers and wing walls are at the south entrance to the gardens of the hall, and are in sandstone and limestone. The piers have moulded plinths, square rusticated shafts, cornices, and ball finials. The short wing walls have ashlar copings, and end piers with pyramidal caps.	II
2, 2A and 4 Market Street; 54.15564°N 3.18524°W	—	Late 18th to early 19th century	A row of three cottages, partly roughcast and partly stuccoed, with a green slate roof. They have two storeys, and each cottage has one bay. Most of the windows are casements, and there is one sash window.	II
16, 18 and 20 Market Street; 54.15580°N 3.18439°W	—	Late 18th to early 19th century	A row of three houses, partly rendered and partly roughcast, with slate roofs. Each house has two storeys and two bays. No. 16 has a doorway and sash windows, the ground floor window having three lights. No. 18 has a central doorway with a chamfered surround and a fanlight, with sash windows on the right and a 2-storey bay window to the left. No. 20 has a central porch with a segmentally-arched carriage entrance to the right, a sash window to the left, and casement windows in the upper floor.	II
148, 150 and 152 Market Street; 54.15707°N 3.17790°W	—	Late 18th to early 19th century	A row of two shops and a house in stuccoed stone and with a slate roof. There are two storeys, and each building has one bays. The outer buildings have shop fronts, and the house in the centre has a recessed doorway with a stone surround and a window with wooden pilasters and a cornice. In the upper floor of No. 152 is a sash window, and in the other buildings are casement windows.	II
Bank House and Church House; 54.15518°N 3.18729°W	—	Late 18th to early 19th century	Originally a farmhouse and a barn, later converted into two interlocking houses, both parts roughcast and with slate roofs. Bank House has two storeys with an attic, and two bays. The doorway has a moulded hood carried on two Doric columns, above which is a canted bay window. To the left of the doorway is another canted bay window, the other windows being sashes. Church House to the left has two storeys, a door with sidelights, and casement windows.	II
Barns and cow house, Elliscale Farm; 54.16225°N 3.18755°W	—	Late 18th to early 19th century	A group of farm buildings in limestone with quoins and slate roofs. They form an L-shaped plan, and consist of a one-storey four-bay barn, a five-bay bank barn with a cow house beneath, and a barn of three bays with a half-basement. The openings include wagon entrances, windows, doorways and ventilation holes. Other features include coped gables and a weathervane.	II
Wall and farm building, Elliscale Farm; 54.16238°N 3.18812°W	—	Late 18th to early 19th century	The wall encloses the garden to the south and west of Elliscale Farmhouse. It is in limestone and has rough slab coping. The north part contains six bee boles, and opposite the door of the farmhouse are gate piers. At the southwest corner the wall is attached to a farm building that is also in limestone, and has quoins, a slate roof, two storeys, and three bays.	II
Pinfold; 54.15411°N 3.18623°W	—	Late 18th to early 19th century	The pinfold is in limestone, and consists of a circular enclosure with triangular copings, about 10 metres (33 ft) in diameter and between 1 metre (3 ft 3 in) and 2 metres (6 ft 7 in) in height. There is an opening on the west side with a gatepost and an iron gate.	II
Romney gravestone 54.15478°N 3.18673°W	—	1802	The gravestone is in the churchyard of St Mary's Church and commemorates the portrait painter George Romney. It consists of a slate slab on a moulded plinth. There is a Latin inscription on the slab, and on the plinth is an inscription in English recording the restoration of the gravestone in 1895.	II
13, 14 and 15 Market Place and outbuildings 54.15583°N 3.18630°W	—	Early 19th century	A row of three houses, rendered with slate roofs, in two storeys. Nos. 13 and 14 have two bays, and No. 15 has three bays and a rear wing. No. 14 has a doorway with an architrave, a fanlight, and a cornice on consoles. The windows in Nos. 13 and 14 are sashes, those in the ground floor having three lights with pilasters and cornices. The doorway to No. 15 has a cornice, and the windows at the front and in the rear wing are casements.	II
33 Market Street; 54.15631°N 3.18350°W	—	Early 19th century	A stuccoed stone house with a slate roof, in two storeys and two bays. Above the door is a cornice on consoles, and the windows are sashes with segmental heads.	II
46 Market Street; 54.15609°N 3.18337°W	—	Early 19th century	The house is in rendered stone, and it has a tile roof. There are two storeys and two bays. The central doorway has a chamfered surround, and the sash windows have projecting sills and raised surrounds.	II
47, 49 and 51 Market Street; 54.15643°N 3.18290°W	—	Early 19th century	A row of two houses and a shop, stuccoed, with a roof of slate and tile, each building having two storeys and an attic. No. 47 has one bay, and the others have two bays each. No. 47 has a doorway, sash windows, and a gabled roof dormer, and No. 49 also has a doorway and sash windows, and a bay window and a four-light dormer. No. 51 is a shop with a passage door on the left, and an ornate cast iron shop front that includes arcaded panels, columns with composite capitals, pierced spandrels, and cresting. Above are casement windows and a full-length dormer.	II
54 Market Street; 54.15627°N 3.18254°W	—	Early 19th century	Originally a bank, later a shop, it is stuccoed, with a slate roof, two storeys, two bays, and a rear wing. On the ground floor are a side passage with a basket arch, a doorway with a stone architrave, and a three-light sash window with mullions in the form of small columns. In the upper floor are plain sash windows.	II
96 Market Street and wall 54.15631°N 3.17991°W	—	Early 19th century	A rendered house with a slate roof, in two storeys and two bays. The doorway has a cornice on consoles, and the windows are sashes. In front of the garden is a wall that has limestone end piers with triangular copings.	II
St Mary's Cottage; 54.15525°N 3.18697°W	—	Early 19th century (probable)	Originally two cottages, later converted into one house, it is stuccoed with a tiled roof. There are two storeys and three bays. On the front is a canted bay window flanked by doorways with hoods. The windows are sashes, one with a segmental head.	II
The Peathouse, Tytup Hall; 54.17369°N 3.17211°W	—	Early 19th century (probable)	Originally a coach house and stable, later converted into a garage and flat, it is roughcast and has a slate roof with coped gables and ball finials. It contains a garage door and casement windows.	II
Gate piers, Tytup Hall; 54.17444°N 3.17160°W	—	Early to mid 19th century	A pair of square gate piers that flank the north entrance to the garden of the hall. They are in sandstone, and each pier has a rusticated shaft, standing on an upswept pedestal, and at the top has a cornice and a ball finial.	II
2, 3 and 4 King's Mount, and stable 54.15609°N 3.18574°W	—	Early to mid 19th century	A row of three houses and a stable in limestone. The houses are roughcast with two storeys. Nos.3 and 4 have sash windows, and doors with fanlights, No. 3 also has a canopy. No. 2 is set back and earlier, and has one casement window in the ground floor, the others being sashes, and a gabled dormer. The stable has large quoins, and a casement window and a doorway with sandstone arches.	II
2–8 Ulverston Road; 54.15725°N 3.17694°W	—	Early to mid 19th century	A row of three houses and a shop, stuccoed with slate roofs. Each building has two storeys and one bay. The doorways are on the right, that of No. 8 having a fanlight. The ground floor of No. 2 has an enlarged window, and in the ground floor of No. 6 is a shop window; all the other windows are sashes.	II
Beckside Conservative Club; 54.15551°N 3.17934°W	—	Early to mid 19th century	Originally a house and later used as a club, it is in roughcast limestone on a plinth, with a string course and a slate roof. It has a central block with two storeys and three bays and side wings of one storey and one bay. Four steps lead up to a central doorway with a Doric porch. The windows are sashes.	II
Vicarage, Vicarage Cottage and wall 54.15520°N 3.18634°W	—	Early to mid 19th century	The vicarage and cottage are roughcast with a green slate roof, and have two storeys and attics. The vicarage has three bays, and a central porch with Doric columns and a doorway with a fanlight and a broken pediment. To the right is a canted bay window, and the other windows are sashes. The cottage to the left projects forward, it has one bay, and also has sash windows. The garden wall is low, it has a limestone end pier at the right, and a pair of octagonal gate piers opposite the porch.	II
Dalton House; 54.15599°N 3.18678°W	—	c. 1840	A pebbledashed limestone house on a plinth, with a string course, a modillioned cornice, and a slate roof. It has two storeys with attics, and three bays. The central doorway has pilasters with sunken panels, a dentilled string, a frieze with roundels, a cornice, and a fanlight. The windows are sashes.	II
The Clarence; 54.15752°N 3.17576°W		Mid 19th century	A stuccoed public house with quoins and a hipped slate roof, standing on a corner site. The central part has three storeys, with two bays on Queen Street, three bays on Ulverston Road, and a two-storey two-bay extension. There is an angled corner entrance with a patterned lintel. The windows are sashes, those in the lower two floors with wedge lintels.	II
White Horse Public House; 54.15569°N 3.18503°W		Mid 19th century	The public house is stuccoed with a green slate roof. It has two storeys with an attic, and there are three bays. The doorway has fluted pilasters, a fanlight, a modillioned cornice, and a rusticated panel. The windows in the right two bays are sashes, and the left bay, which is later, has a canted corner, and contains casement windows.	II
Cavendish Arms Public House; 54.15555°N 3.18562°W	—	1855	The public house is stuccoed with a slate roof, and has two storeys and four bays. The doorway has an architrave, a fanlight, and a cornice on consoles. The windows are sashes with architraves, and at the right is a carriage entrance with a basket arch, imposts, and a dated keystone.	II
Dalton Cemetery, northernmost chapel 54.15232°N 3.18479°W		1862	The chapel is in limestone with sandstone dressings and a slate roof. It consists of a nave that has a rounded east apse with a semi-conical roof, and a gabled wing and a loggia to the west. On the east gable is a bellcote.	II
4 Market Place; 54.15550°N 3.18576°W	—	Mid to late 19th century	A pebbledashed house with moulded eaves and a slate roof, in two storeys and two bays. Above the door is a fanlight and a cornice on consoles, and the windows are sashes.	II
19 Market Street with barn and wall 54.15607°N 3.18437°W	—	Mid to late 19th century	The house and barn have slate roofs. The house is pebbledashed, in two storeys, with three bays and a rear wing. The central doorway has an architrave, a fanlight, and a cornice on consoles, to the left is a canted bay window with a cornice, and to the right is a three-light window. In the upper floor the windows have cornices on consoles; all the windows are sashes. The barn, lower and to the right, is in limestone rubble, and contains a cart entrance and a doorway, both with segmental heads. Enclosing the front garden is a dwarf wall with limestone corner piers.	II
Castle View; 54.15532°N 3.18620°W	—	Mid to late 19th century	A house that has an earlier core, it is roughcast with a slate-hung left gable and a slate roof. There are two storeys with cellars and attics, and two bays. The doorway has a wooden architrave and a cornice on consoles. To the right are sash windows, and to the left is a two-storey canted bay window.	II
Seventh Day Adventist Church; 54.15751°N 3.17601°W		1868	The church is stuccoed with quoins, and has a slate roof. There is a single tall storey with a half-basement, an entrance front of three bays, and four bays on the sides. On the front is a gabled porch with a round-arched window and doors on the sides, and above it is a blocked round-arched window and a date plaque. Along the sides is a sill band and round-arched windows. There are railings around the basement area, steps leading down to doors, and sash windows in the half-basement.	II
Market cross and stone benches 54.15556°N 3.18626°W		1869–70	The cross and the benches are in limestone. The cross is on the site of an earlier cross, and consists of a chamfered square column with a plain cross. It has a base of three steps and stands on a platform of four steps. The benches are two quadrants with slab pillars and tilted tops, originally used for the sale of fish. They are surrounded by a pebble pavement.	II
11 Market Place; 54.15560°N 3.18657°W	—	c. 1870	Originally a Cooperative shop, and later a restaurant, it is stuccoed on a plinth, with limestone quoins, a string course, and a hipped slate roof. There are three storeys, and three bays on the front and on the sides. The central doorway has pilasters and a fanlight, and it is flanked by casement windows, with another window in the angled corner on the right. Above, the windows are sashes, and in the centre is a pediment.	II
Cornerstone House; 54.15796°N 3.18143°W	—	c. 1870	A rendered house on a corner site, with sandstone dressings including quoins, a slate roof, and three storeys. There are two bays on Chapel Street, three on Fell Croft, and a two-storey, two-bay extension beyond. All the windows are sashes, and each bay in the main block is gabled with a half-dormer. The round-headed doorways on each front have stone surrounds, and a fanlight with an archivolt and a rusticated keystone.	II
1 and 2 Market Place; 54.15562°N 3.18543°W	—	Late 19th century	A pair of houses, one stuccoed, one pebbledashed, with a slate roof. They have two storeys with cellars and attics, and each house has two bays. They have doorways with fanlights under gabled canopies, bay windows, sash windows in the upper floor, and gabled dormers above.	II
North Lodge, gatehouse and wing walls, Abbotswood; 54.14530°N 3.19277°W	—	Late 19th century	The buildings are at the north entrance to the grounds of Abbotswood, a country house that has been demolished. They are in sandstone with slate roofs. The gatehouse has two storeys, buttresses, and a moulded arch, above which is a niche with a statue, and a parapet. The gabled lodge has one bay, and contains mullioned and transomed windows. The screen wall contains lancet windows and has a parapet with triangular copings.	II
St Mary's Church; 54.15488°N 3.18706°W		1883–85	The church was designed by Paley and Austin in Decorated style, and replaced the previous church on the site. It is in sandstone with a green slate roof on a chamfered plinth, and consists of a nave, aisles, north and south porches, a chancel with a north vestry and a south chapel, and a tower at the west end of the nave. The tower has three stages, an embattled parapet, and an octagonal stair turret on the southwest corner rising higher than the tower. There is chequerwork decoration on the parapets, over the porches, and above the east and west windows.	II*
Former Local Board Offices; 54.15569°N 3.18025°W	—	1884	The offices are in limestone with sandstone dressings and a slate roof. There are two storeys and five bays. The left bay is roofed as a cross-wing, it has a large window in the upper floor, and a gable with ball finials and an obelisk. On the roof is a clock tower with an iron balustrade, an ogee roof, and a weathervane. The second bay contains the main entrance, with a moulded surround, a fanlight, a carved frieze, and a dentilled cornice. Above it is a casement window with an inscribed frieze, and a Flemish gable. The right three bays are gabled and contain three-light windows with mullions and sashes. In the right bay is a former vehicle entrance with a basket arch.	II
Outbuildings, former Local Board Office; 54.15582°N 3.17995°W	—	1884	The buildings originated as a house and stables for a fire station, and are in limestone with slate roofs. Both have two storeys, and three bays, a door with a fanlight, and casement windows. The stables, set forward to the left, also have a rectangular hatch in the upper floor flanked by pitching holes in the form of oculi.	II
Chappells Tavern; 54.15753°N 3.18246°W	—	1892	Originally a Cooperative shop, later used for other purposes, it is in limestone with sandstone dressings, quoins, a dentilled eaves cornice, and a slate roof. It stands on a corner site, it has two storeys, and there are three bays on Chapel Street, four on Nelson Street, and one on the corner between them. The corner bay, originally a doorway, has been converted into a window, and has an architrave, a datestone flanked by pilasters, and a dentilled segmental pediment. At the top of the bay are ball finials. There are entrances on both streets, each with an architrave, and above them are two oculi with pilasters and a dentilled cornice, and a shaped gable. The building also has shop windows containing stained gloss.	II
Ashburner House, Dowdales School; 54.15980°N 3.18463°W	—	c. 1895	A former large house, later part of a school, in sandstone on a chamfered plinth, with a slate roof that has coped gables with finials. It has two storeys with an attic, a three-bay front with a three-storey tower, and a single-storey rear wing. The windows have quoined surrounds, and the house has embattled parapets with gadrooned ball finials. The doorway has pilasters, a basket arch, a keystone carved with acanthus, a dentilled cornice, and a fanlight. To the right of the tower is a stair turret, and to the left is a two-storey canted bay window.	II
National Westminster Bank and Bank Chambers; 54.15653°N 3.18158°W	—	c. 1895	The bank and offices are in limestone with slate roofs. The bank, on a corner site, has two storeys with attics, two bays on each front, and a bay on the corner. The entrance in the corner bay has a round-headed fanlight, above which is a balustraded balcony on carved corbels. At the top of the bay is a pedimented shield. The windows are sashes; in the ground floor they are tripartite with segmental heads, in the middle floor they have flat arches with cornices and pedimented keystones, and in the top floor they are in half-dormers and have cornices. The offices at the rear have two storeys, and contain sash windows.	II
Former Wesleyan Sunday school 54.15744°N 3.18274°W	—	1896	The Sunday school has since been used for other purposes. It is in limestone with red sandstone dressings on a chamfered plinth, with quoins, and a slate roof with terracotta ridge tiles and ventilators. There is one storeys and a front of three bays, with a wing at the rear. The central doorway has a quoined surround and a shouldered lintel, and above it is an inscribed plaque. Flanking the door ware quoined cross-windows.	II
Drinking fountain 54.15562°N 3.18588°W		1897	The drinking fountain commemorates the Diamond Jubilee of Queen Victoria. It is in cast iron on a stone plinth. Four fluted columns support an umbrella-like pierced canopy with a crown finial. The structure is embellished with inscriptions and decorations, including dragons at the corners, and roundels, one depicting the queen, and with herons in the others. Inside the canopy is a fountain with a broad bowl on a clustered column.	II
Mill Brow Lodge; 54.14360°N 3.19433°W	—	c. 1900	The lodge is in sandstone with a tile roof, and has two storeys and an L-shaped plan. The casement windows are mullioned with chamfered surrounds and have pointed heads. The porch is half-timbered on a stone plinth and has a corbelled gable with a bargeboard.	II
Public library 54.15754°N 3.18209°W		1903	Built under the patronage of Andrew Carnegie, the library is in limestone with red sandstone dressings on a chamfered plinth with quoins, and has a slate roof with stepped gable copings and finials. There are three storeys, four bays on the entrance front and three on the sides. The entrance has a fanlight with wrought iron tracery and a keyed archivolt. The left bay on the entrance front projects forward and has a ground-floor canted bay window with a cornice, and corner pedestals with gadrooned vases. Above this in the middle floor is a smaller canted bay window. Most of the windows are cross windows.	II
War memorial 54.15491°N 3.17914°W		1922	The war memorial is in Portland stone, and consists of a square chamfered and tapering column on a square plinth with diagonal buttresses. On the top is a moulded capital with a carved eternal flame. Plaques carry the names of those lost in the two world wars, and there are bronze swords and an inscription on the shaft.	II
