= Dalton Castle =

Dalton Castle may refer to:

- Dalton Castle, Cumbria
- Dalton Castle (wrestler)
