= Newton-in-Furness =

Village in Cumbria, England

Coordinates: 54.134°N 3.179°W

Newton
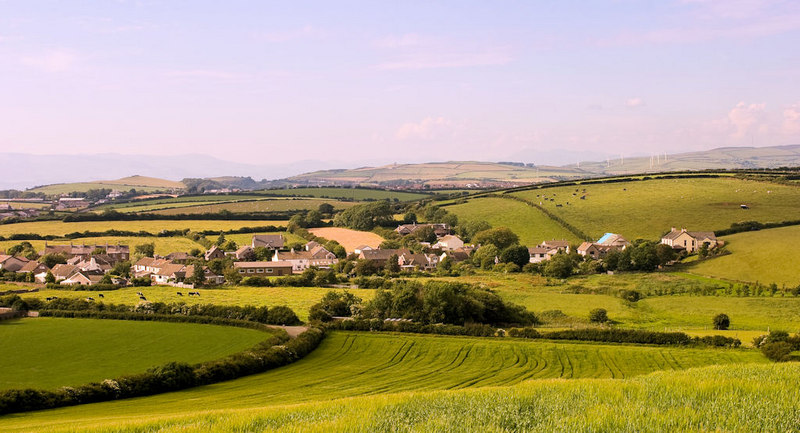
- The hamlet of Newton

- Location in Barrow-in-Furness Borough Location within Cumbria
- OS grid reference: SD230716
- Civil parish: Dalton Town with Newton
- Unitary authority: Westmorland and Furness
- Ceremonial county: Cumbria
- Region: North West
- Country: England
- Sovereign state: United Kingdom
- Post town: BARROW-IN-FURNESS
- Postcode district: LA13
- Dialling code: 01229
- Police: Cumbria
- Fire: Cumbria
- Ambulance: North West
- UK Parliament: Barrow and Furness

Newton is a village in the civil parish of Dalton Town with Newton, in the Westmorland and Furness district, in the ceremonial county of Cumbria, England. It is located on the Furness peninsula north-east of the port of Barrow-in-Furness and south of the town of Dalton-in-Furness. It was historically in Lancashire.

Newton was listed in the Domesday Book as being one of the vills or townships forming the Manor of Hougun which was held by Tostig Godwinson, Earl of Northumbria.

GB News presenter Stephen Dixon was born in the village, as was Richard T. Slone, a painter. Both were in the same year at school and were educated firstly in Newton and then in Dalton-in-Furness.

== See also ==
- Listed buildings in Dalton Town with Newton
