= Dalton Town Hall =

Municipal building in Dalton-in-Furness, Cumbria, England

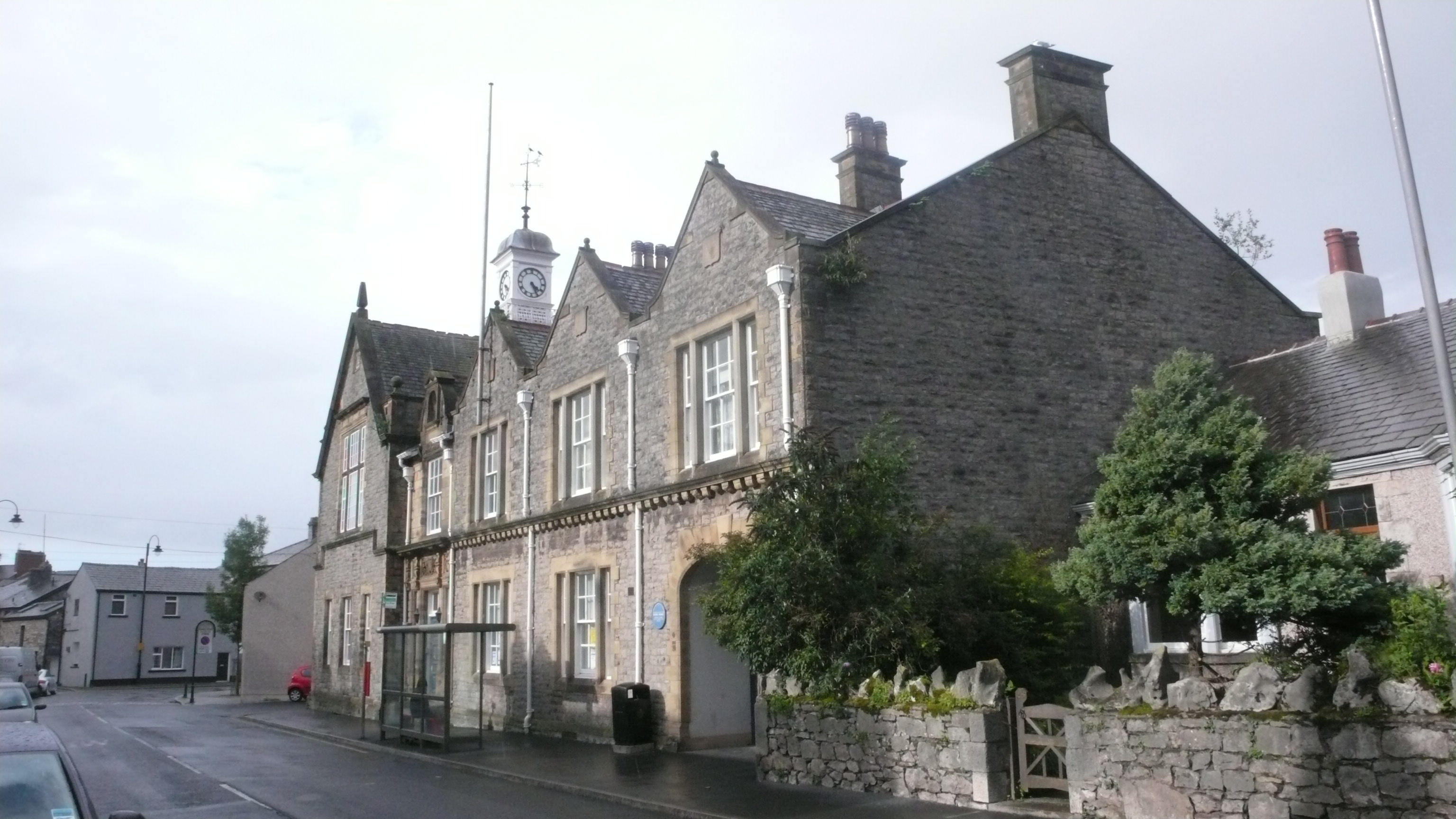
- The building in 2012

- Shown in Cumbria
- 54.1558°N 3.1806°W
- Location: Station Road, Dalton-in-Furness

History
- Built: 1884

Site notes
- Architect: John Young McIntosh
- Architectural style: Renaissance style

Listed Building – Grade II
- Official name: Former local board offices
- Designated: 5 May 1976
- Reference no.: 1218867

Dalton Town Hall is a municipal building in Station Road, Dalton-in-Furness, a town in Cumbria, England. The building, which accommodates the offices and meeting place of Dalton-in-Furness Town Council, is a Grade II listed building.

== History ==
Following significant population growth, largely associated with its status as a market town, Dalton-in-Furness established a local board in 1872. The new board set up rented offices in a building on Market Square in 1873. It then decided to procure permanent accommodation: after some discussion as to whether the new building should be arcaded on the ground floor, so that markets could be held, it was decided to proceed with a dedicated municipal building on a site on Station Road in 1883. The building was designed by John Young McIntosh in the Renaissance style, built in rubble masonry and was completed in 1884.

The design involved an asymmetrical main frontage of five bays facing onto Station Road. The first bay on the left was slightly projected forward and gabled: it was fenestrated with three sash windows on the ground floor and with a large mullioned and transomed window on the first floor. The second bay on the left featured a double-panel doorway flanked by lancet windows and surmounted by frieze carved with swags and scales of justice on the ground floor, a casement window on the first floor and a Dutch gable containing a niche at attic level. The third and fourth bays were fenestrated by tri-partite windows on both floors, while the right-hand bay contained a carriage entrance, for fire service access, with voussoirs and a keystone on the ground floor and a tri-partite window on the first floor. The three right-hand bays were all gabled. Above and behind the left-hand gable there was a small clocktower, with a clock designed and manufactured by Potts of Leeds and an ogee-shaped dome. Internally, the complex contained offices for the board, a boardroom, a cottage, and stables for the fire engines and ambulance. In order to generate income, the boardroom and some of the office space was rented out to other organisations.

In 1894, the local board was succeeded by an urban district council, which continued to use the town hall as its headquarters. The fire service remained on site until 1969, when it moved to Butts Beck off Broughton Road. The town hall continued to serve as the headquarters of the district council for much of the 20th century, but ceased to be the local seat of government when the enlarged Barrow-in-Furness Borough Council was formed in 1974. The building was grade II listed in 1976.

Parts of the town hall were subsequently used to accommodate the housing and rates sections of the borough council, while the boardroom was used for community events, such as exercise and dance classes. In 1994, the building was sold to the Bradford & Northern Housing Association, which converted most of the building into flats. The ground floor of the right-hand bay, which had originally been used by the fire service, was leased back by the council as a housing and cash office, while Dalton Town Council took over the boardroom. In the mid-2000s, the borough council closed its office, which was taken over by the town council.
