= Dalton Town with Newton =

Civil parish in Cumbria, England

Coordinates: 54.142353°N 3.1823230°W

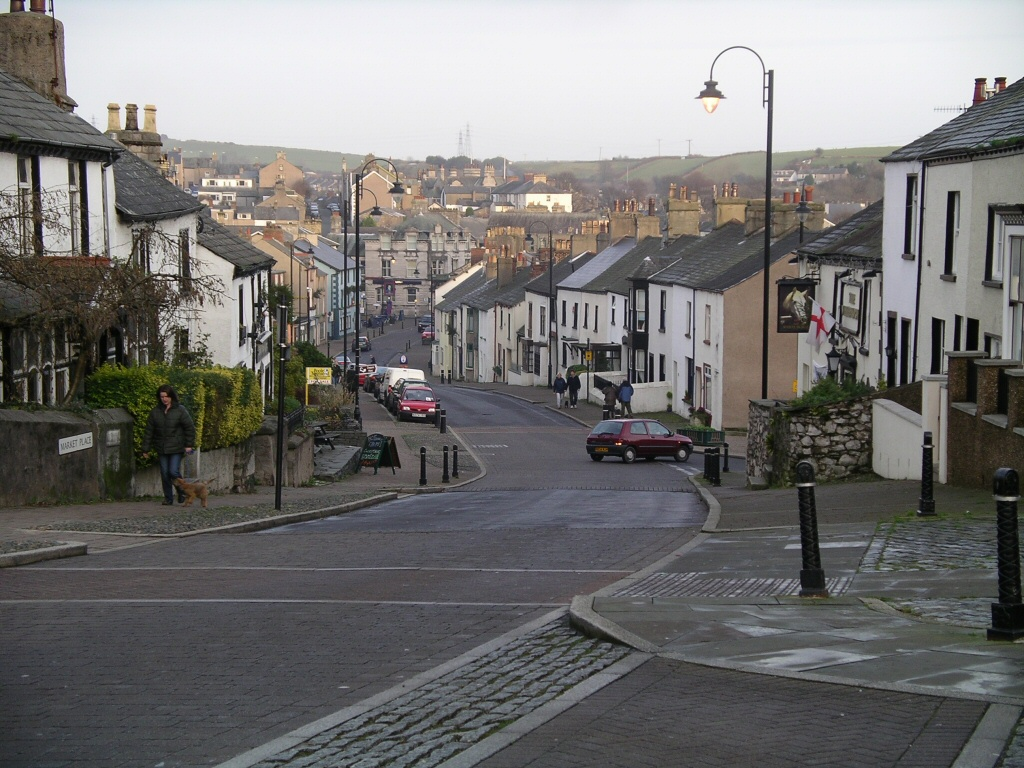
- Market Street, Dalton-in-Furness

- Location within Cumbria
- Area: 8.74 km^{2} (3.37 sq mi)
- Population: 8,125 (2011 Census)
  - Density: 930/km^{2} (2,400/sq mi)
- Civil parish: Dalton Town with Newton
- Unitary authority: Westmorland and Furness
- Ceremonial county: Cumbria
- Region: North West
- Country: England
- Sovereign state: United Kingdom
- Police: Cumbria
- Fire: Cumbria
- Ambulance: North West

Dalton Town with Newton is a civil parish in Westmorland and Furness unitary authority, in the ceremonial county of Cumbria, England. The parish includes the town of Dalton-in-Furness and the hamlet of Newton. In 2011 it had a population of 8,125. The parish touches Aldingham, Askam and Ireleth, Lindal and Marton and Urswick.

== Features ==
There are 70 listed buildings in Dalton Town with Newton.

== History ==
The parish was formed in 1987 from part of the unparished area of Dalton-in-Furness.
