= Stephen Dixon (newsreader) =

English news presenter (born 1974)

- Born: 1 March 1974 (age 52); Newton-in-Furness, Lancashire, England
- Education: Nottingham Trent University
- Occupation: News presenter
- Employer(s): Sky News (2000–2021); GB News (2021–2025)

Stephen Dixon (born 1 March 1974) is an English news presenter. He presents Breakfast with Stephen and Ellie and Breakfast with Stephen and Anne on GB News.

== Journalism career ==
Dixon's career began at Nottingham Trent University where he read for a BA in broadcast journalism, graduating in 1995.

Before working for Sky News, Dixon worked for ITN as both a presenter and producer for ITV, NBC Superchannel, and Channel 5.

He also helped work as a producer and programme editor on the Channel 4 Big Breakfast News and presented on finance channel Simply Money with Angela Rippon.

From January 2012 to October 2019, Dixon presented Sunrise on Sky News, alongside Gillian Joseph, and Isabel Webster. From October 2019, he presented Sky News @ Breakfast with Gillian Joseph, on Friday, Saturday and Sunday on Sky News.

In November 2021, it was announced that Dixon was joining GB News the following month.

== Literary career ==
Dixon published a poetry anthology in 2018 entitled Love is the Beauty of the Soul.

== Personal life ==
Dixon, who has Type 1 diabetes (he was diagnosed when he was 17 years old), is openly gay.

Prior to April 2010, Dixon was referred to on Sky News, and on his official website as "Steve".

Stephen announced on social media that he was marrying his husband in the Lake District on 19 May 2022. He disclosed a single photograph of the happy couple, citing it was the only photograph the public would see as his husband is not in the public eye owing to his profession. Their faces were not shown in the media post.
