= George Romney (painter) =

English painter (1734–1802)

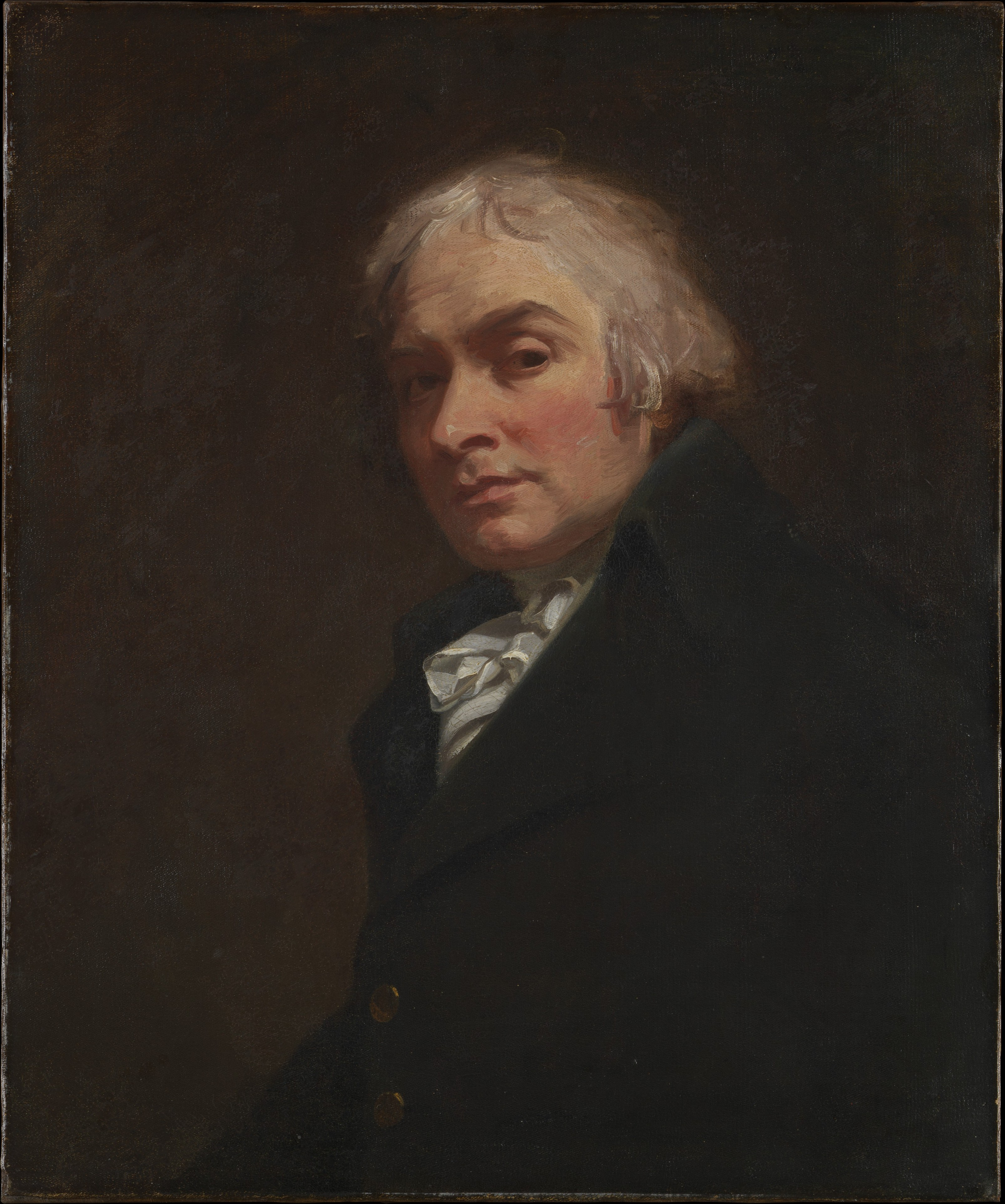
- Self-portrait, 1795
- Born: 26 December 1734; Dalton-in-Furness, Lancashire, England
- Died: 15 November 1802 (aged 67); Kendal, Westmorland, England
- Known for: Painting
- Spouse: Mary Abbot (m. 1756)
- Children: 1

George Romney (26 December [O.S. 15 December] 1734 – 15 November 1802) was an English painter. He was the most fashionable artist of his day, painting many leading society figures – including his artistic muse, Emma Hamilton, mistress of Lord Nelson.

== Early life and training ==
Romney was born in Beckside in Dalton-in-Furness, Lancashire (now in Cumbria), the 3rd son (of 11 children) of John Romney, cabinet maker, and Anne Simpson. Raised in a cottage named High Cocken in modern-day Barrow-in-Furness, he was sent to school at nearby Dendron. He appears to have been an indifferent student and was withdrawn at the age of 11 and apprenticed to his father's business instead.

He proved to have a natural ability for drawing and making things from wood – including violins (which he played throughout his life). From the age of 15, he was taught art informally by a local watchmaker called John Williamson, but his studies began in earnest in 1755, when he went to Kendal, at the age of 21, for a 4-year apprenticeship with local artist Christopher Steele – a portraitist who had himself studied with distinguished French artist Carle Vanloo. All costs were to be borne by George's father.

In October 1756, Romney married Mary Abbot (a decision he initially regretted), but the couple were immediately separated when he was called away to York on business by his employer. After a year, Steele eventually agreed to cancel the apprenticeship, at George's request, leaving the young artist – now a father of a son – free to pursue his own career as a painter.

== Work ==
=== Westmorland ===
In 1757, Romney rejoined his wife and young son in Kendal, working as a portraitist, landscape and historical painter. In this period he became friends with Adam Walker, the inventor and writer, and also pursued musical interests in his spare time. In March 1762, he parted from his wife, son and daughter (the latter dying in 1763), to seek his fortune in London, where he stayed (apart from a few return visits to Cumbria) until 1799. Throughout the separation, he maintained contact with his family and financially supported them, but they never lived with him in the capital.

=== London ===
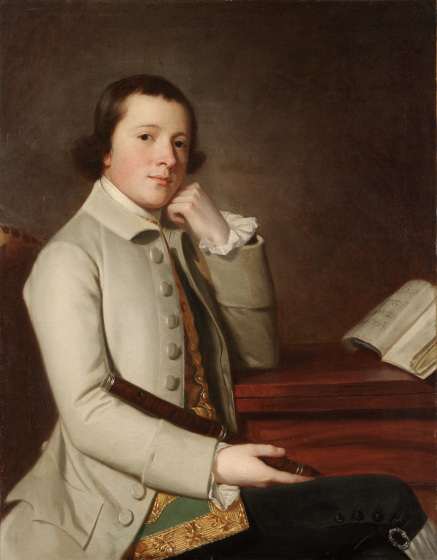
Young Man with a Flute, late 1760s, Dallas Museum of Art

In 1763, Romney entered his painting, The Death of General Wolfe, into a Royal Society of Arts competition. According to friends of Romney, he was awarded the second prize of 50 guineas, but this was later reduced to 25 guineas on questionable grounds. It is said that Sir Joshua Reynolds himself was the prime mover behind this decision, which may have accounted for the lifelong aversion of the two men for each other.

Despite his later success, Romney was never invited to join the Royal Academy of Arts (formed 1768), though he was asked, urged even, to exhibit there – nor did he ever apply to join. This decision certainly cost him valuable royal patronage and support from others connected at court. While there has been much speculation about his actual relationship with the academy, there is no doubt that he normally remained aloof, maintaining that a good artist should succeed without being a member. His own career supported this belief, and it was only towards the end of his life that he expressed the slightest regret for his views.

His early years in the capital were something of a financial struggle . In September 1764, he travelled to Paris (with a friend, lawyer Thomas Greene) for a few weeks to study the works of the old masters (travel abroad was seen as a requisite of a developing artist's training as the opportunity to view great art in London was very limited). In 1765 he again won the second prize of 50 guineas in the Royal Society of Arts competition. In 1768, he made the acquaintance of Richard Cumberland, the dramatist, whose portrait he painted, and who was helpful in introducing him to influential patrons. He also became friends with miniature painter Ozias Humphrey.

1769 was a breakthrough year – he exhibited a large portrait of Sir George Warren and family at the Free Society of Artists, which was greatly admired and helped to lay the foundations of his future popularity. In 1770 he started to exhibit his work at the Chartered Society of Artists rather the rival "Free Society of Artists".

=== Italy ===
By 1772 Romney was financially secure enough to make the journey (with Ozias Humphry) to Italy to study the great artists of the past, as he had always intended. He set off in March, making his way through Europe (via Paris, Lyon, Marseille, Nice, Genoa, Livorno, Florence and Pisa) and arriving in Rome in June. A letter of introduction allowed him to meet the Pope, Clement XIV, who allowed him to set up scaffolding in the Apostolic Palace to study the frescoes of Raphael. He spent 18 months in Rome making studies and sketches of the great art works on view there. He returned to London in July 1775 (via Florence, Bologna, Venice, Parma, and Turin) after an absence of over 2 years.

=== Later career ===
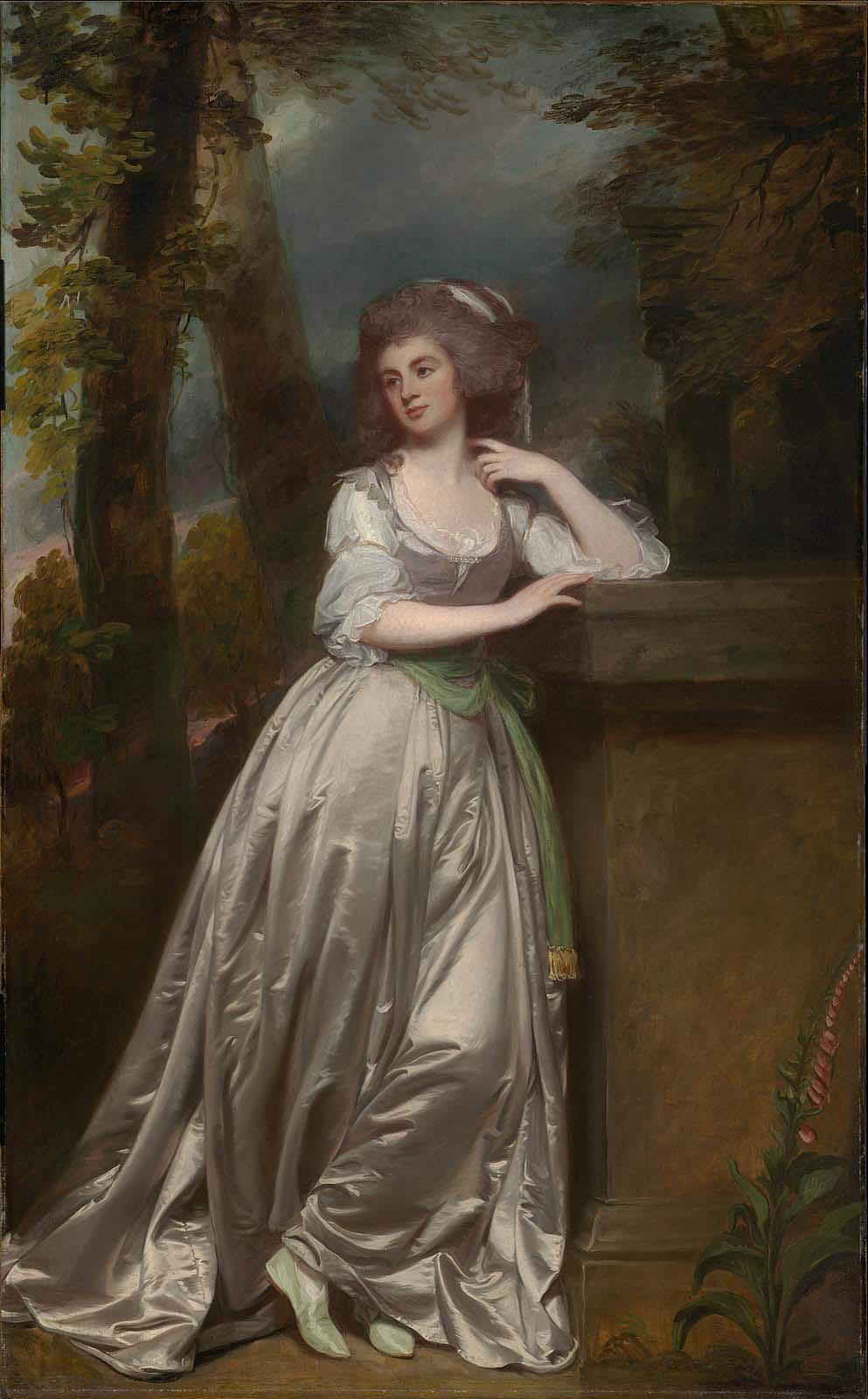
Portrait of Lady Anne de la Pole (1786)

On his return, in 1775, Romney moved to Cavendish Square, in a house formerly owned by noted portraitist Francis Cotes. He was considerably in debt, not only on his own account but also due to being saddled with the debt of his artistic but dissolute brother Peter. However, he was offered commissions by Charles Lennox, 3rd Duke of Richmond and his circle of friends, which helped turn the tide of fortune permanently in the artist's favour. In 1776–77, he made the acquaintance of William Hayley, striking up a lasting friendship with the writer, and painting portraits for him.

1782 was the beginning of an important new chapter in Romney's life, for in that year he was first introduced to Emma Hamilton (then called Emma Hart) who became his muse. He painted more than 60 portraits of her in various poses, sometimes playing the part of historical or mythological figures. He also painted many other contemporaries, including fellow artist Mary Moser and, in 1787, a little-known seventeen-year old young lady in one of his most charming works, Miss Constable in a Bergère Hat.

In 1797 Romney left his studio at 32 Cavendish Square, where he had worked for more than twenty years, to move to Holly Bush Hill in Hampstead. In Hampstead Romney embarked on a series of costly building projects, and sold the house two years later. Romney's House is now a Grade I listed building, and Romney is commemorated by a blue plaque placed on the property.

In the summer of 1799, his health was broken, and after an absence of almost forty years, Romney returned to his wife, Mary, in Kendal. She nursed him during the remaining 2 years of his life until he died in November 1802. He was buried in the churchyard of St Mary's Church, Dalton-in-Furness.

== Public collections of works ==
Romney's work is on display at many museums and art Galleries in the UK, North America and elsewhere:

UK and Ireland

- Abbot Hall Art Gallery (Kendal); Kendal Town Hall (Kendal); Ashmolean Museum (University of Oxford); Courtauld Institute of Art (London); Dorset Museum (Dorchester); Dulwich Picture Gallery (London); National Portrait Gallery, London; National Maritime Museum (London); Tate Gallery (London); Wallace Collection (London); Falmouth Art Gallery; Fitzwilliam Museum (University of Cambridge); Dalton Castle; Manchester City Art Gallery; National Museum Cardiff; National Museums Liverpool; New Art Gallery (Walsall); National Galleries of Scotland; Somerville College, Oxford; Crawford Municipal Art Gallery (Ireland); Waddesdon Manor (Buckinghamshire), Prado Museum (Madrid).

United States and Canada

- Ackland Art Museum (University of North Carolina); Memorial Art Gallery, University of Rochester (New York); Art Institute of Chicago; Beaverbrook Art Gallery (New Brunswick); Blanton Museum of Art (University of Texas at Austin); Brigham Young University Museum of Art (Utah); Carnegie Museum of Art (Pittsburgh); Dallas Museum of Art; Detroit Institute of Arts; the Fine Arts Museums of San Francisco, Robert Hull Fleming Museum (University of Vermont); Frick Collection (New York City); Forsyth County Public Library Central Branch, Winston-Salem, North Carolina; the Getty Museum (Los Angeles); Harvard University Art Museums; Honolulu Museum of Art; Huntington Library (California); the Kimbell Art Museum (Fort Worth, Texas); the Los Angeles County Museum of Art; Metropolitan Museum of Art (New York City); Museum of Fine Arts, Houston (Texas); Museum of Fine Arts, Boston; National Gallery of Art (Washington D.C.); Norton Simon Museum (Pasadena, California); Owens Art Gallery (Mount Allison University, Sackville, NB); Philadelphia Museum of Art; Stan Hywet Hall and Gardens (Ohio); Wadsworth Atheneum (Hartford, Connecticut); Phoenix Art Museum (Phoenix, Arizona); National Gallery of Canada; Folger Shakespeare Library (Washington, D.C.).

Elsewhere

- Dunedin Public Art Gallery (New Zealand); Hermitage Museum (St. Petersburg, Russia), Louvre (Paris, France); Musée des Beaux-Arts de Pau (France), National Gallery of Victoria (Australia), São Paulo Museum of Art (Brazil).

== Selected gallery ==
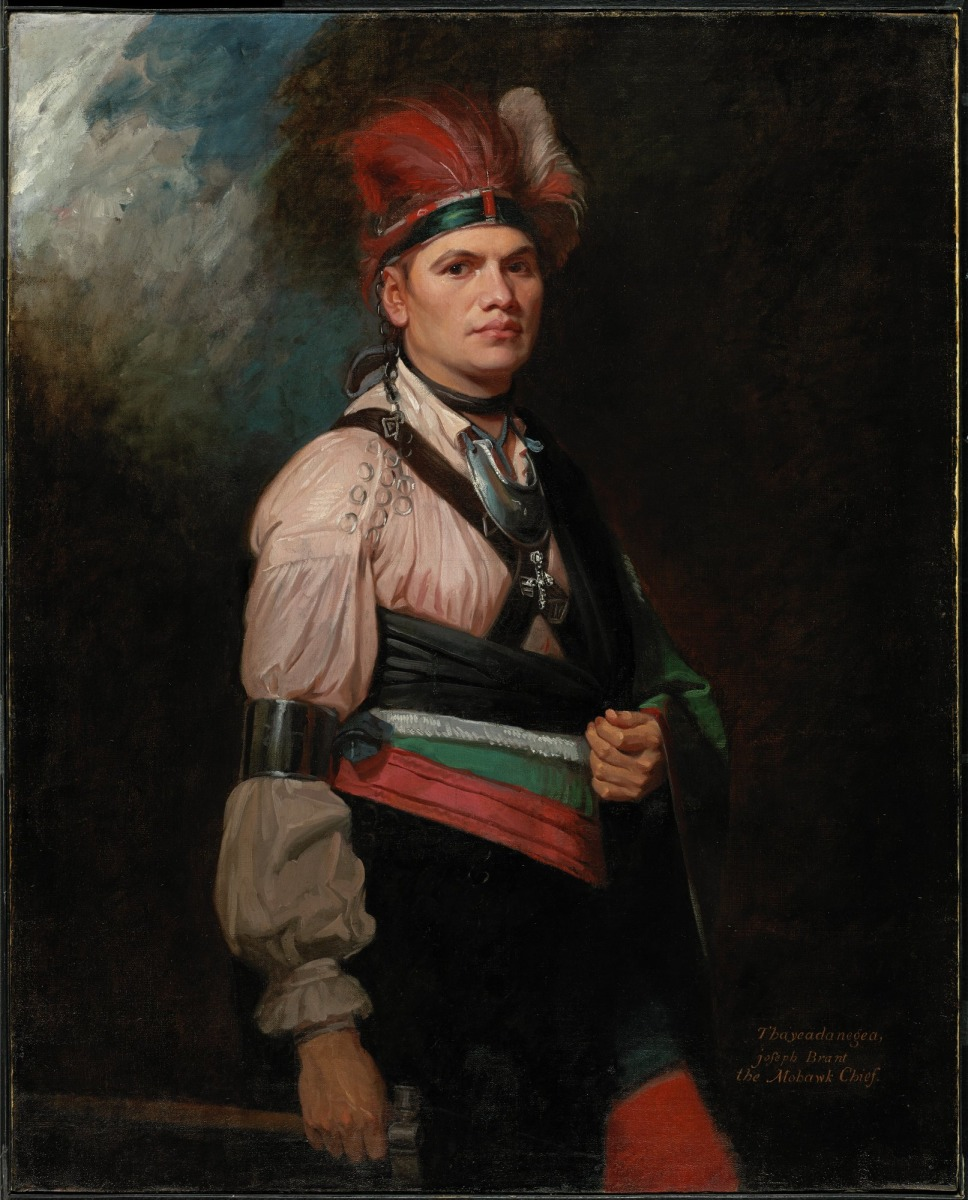
Joseph Brant (1776)

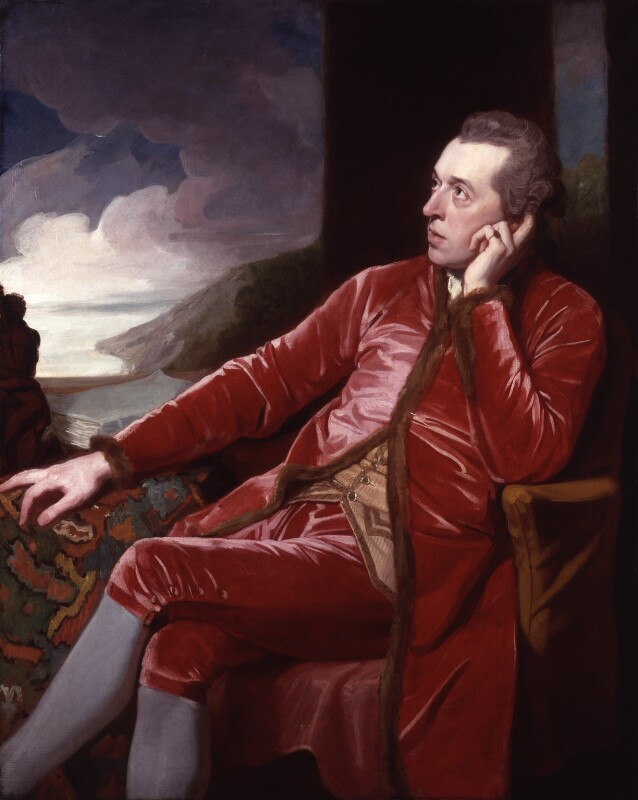
Portrait of Richard Cumberland (1776)

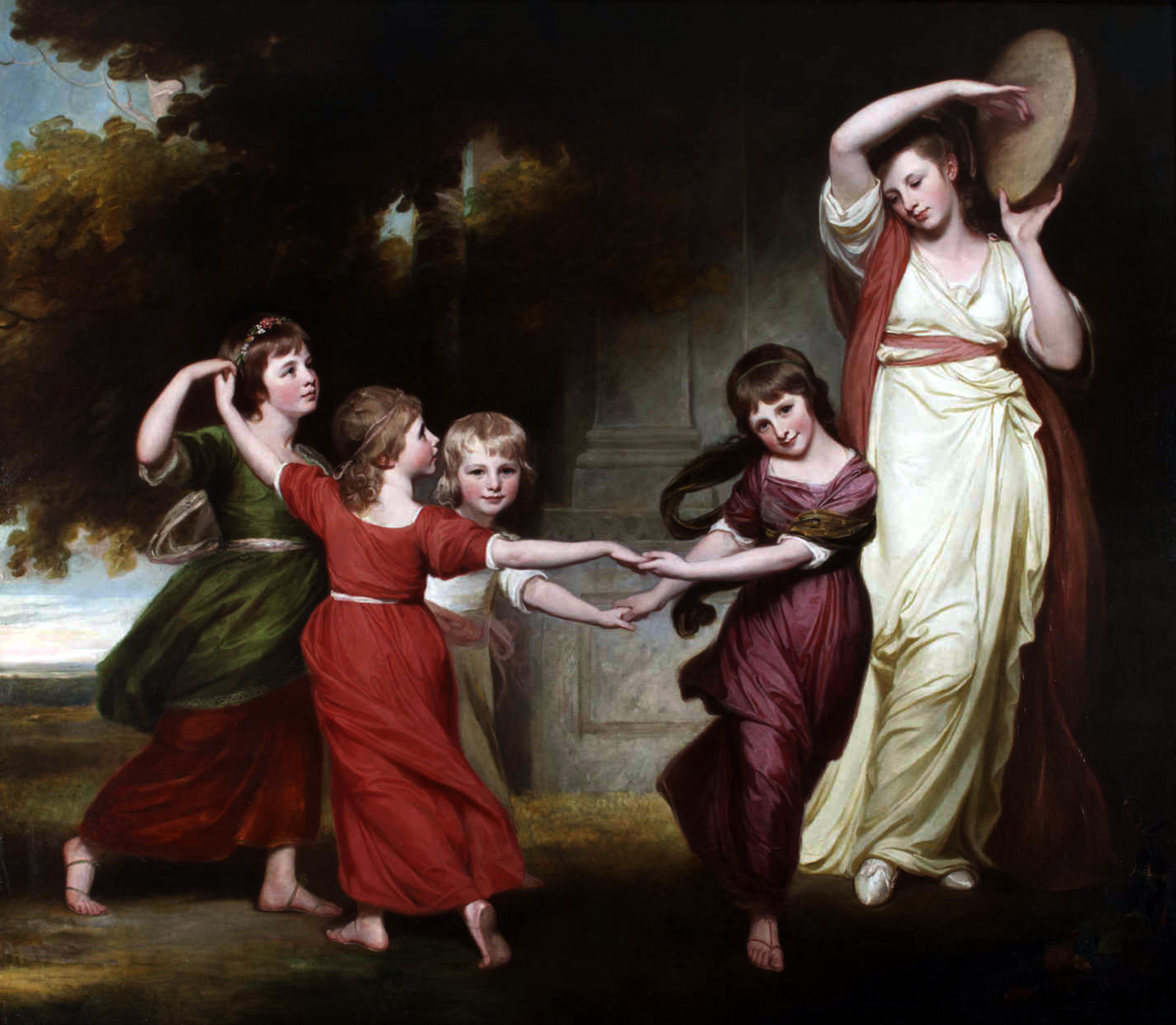
The children of Granville Leveson-Gower, 1st Marquess of Stafford (1776–7)]

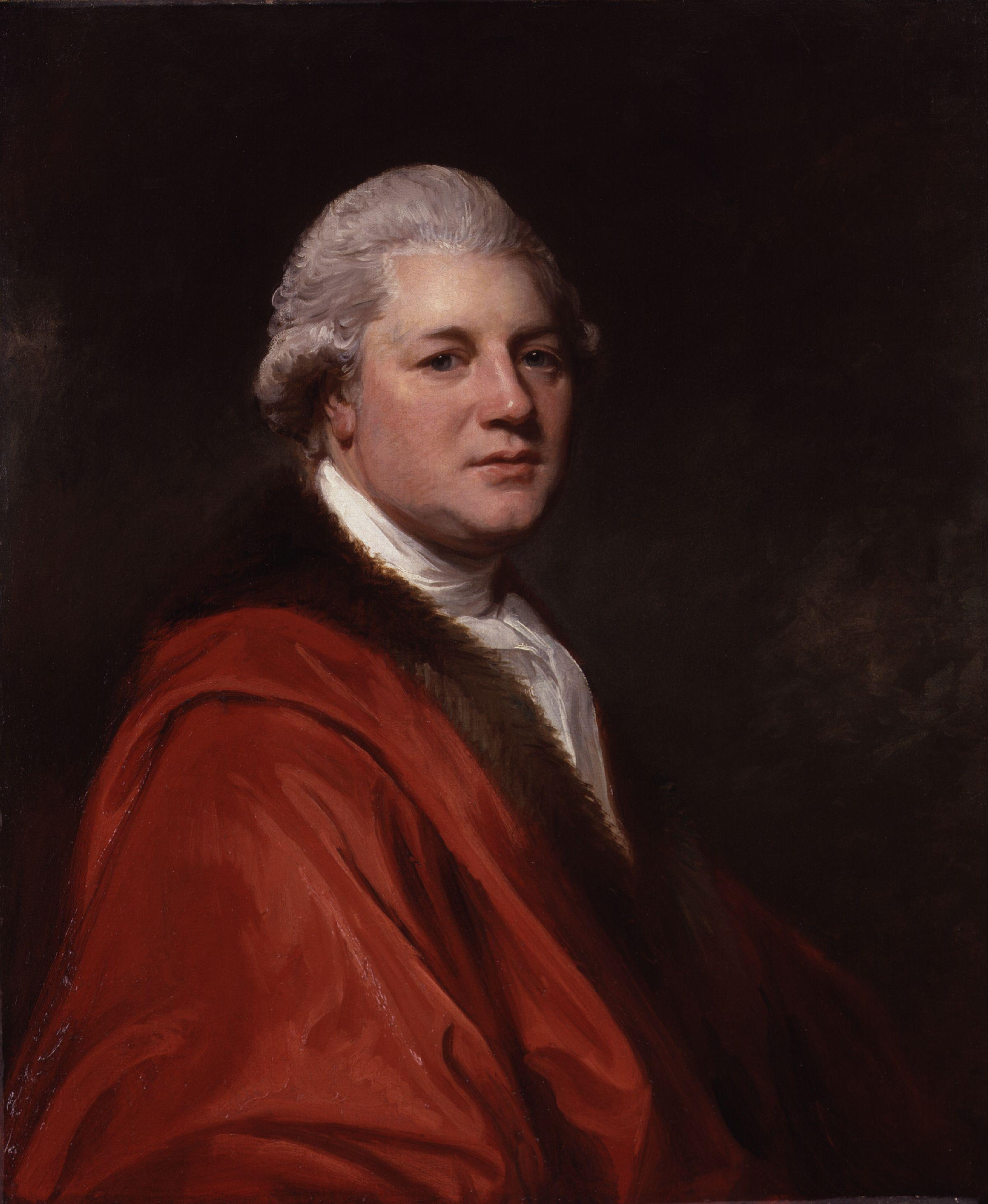
Portrait of James Macpherson (1780)

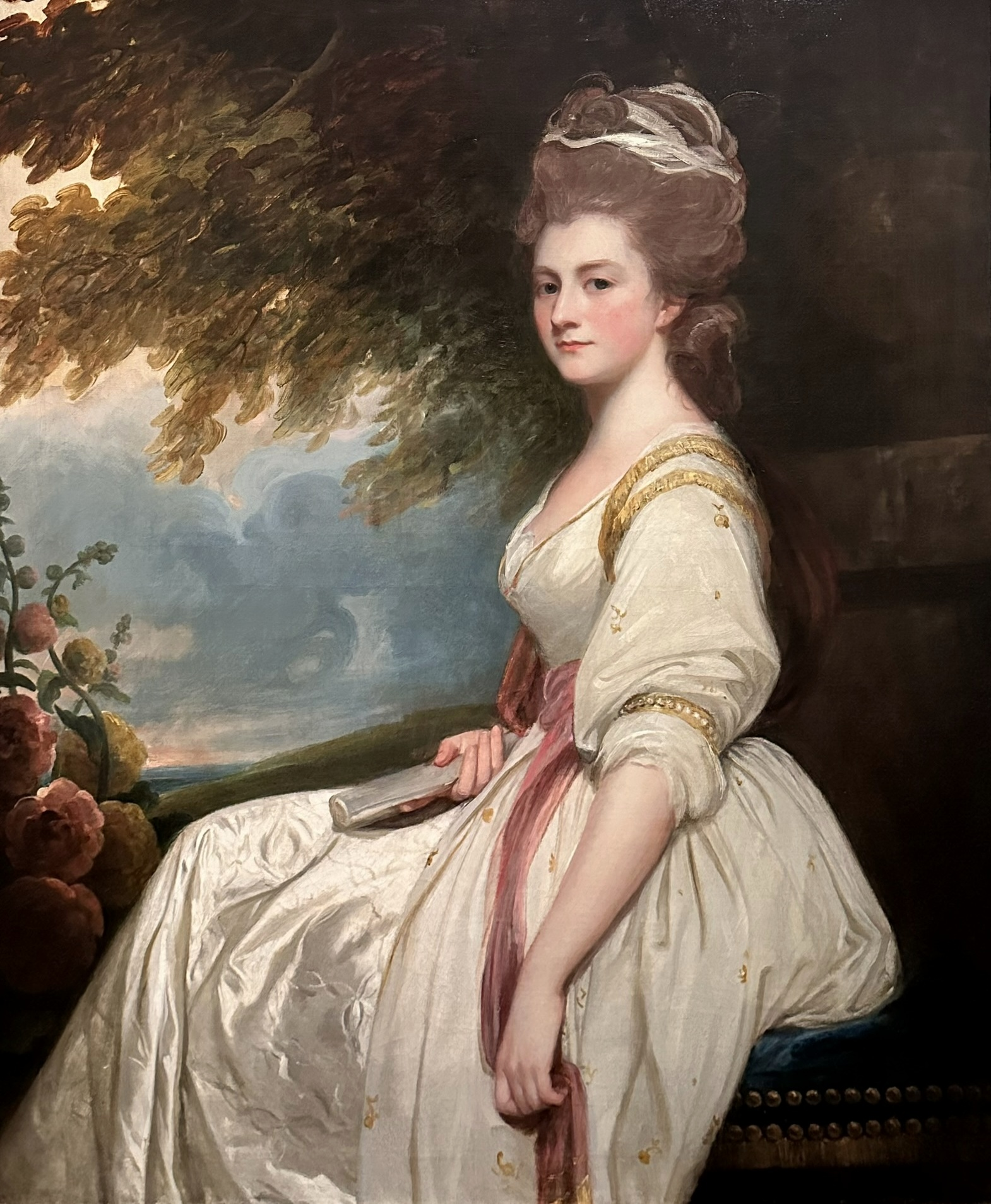
Elizabeth Taylor, Mrs. Charles Chaplin (1781)

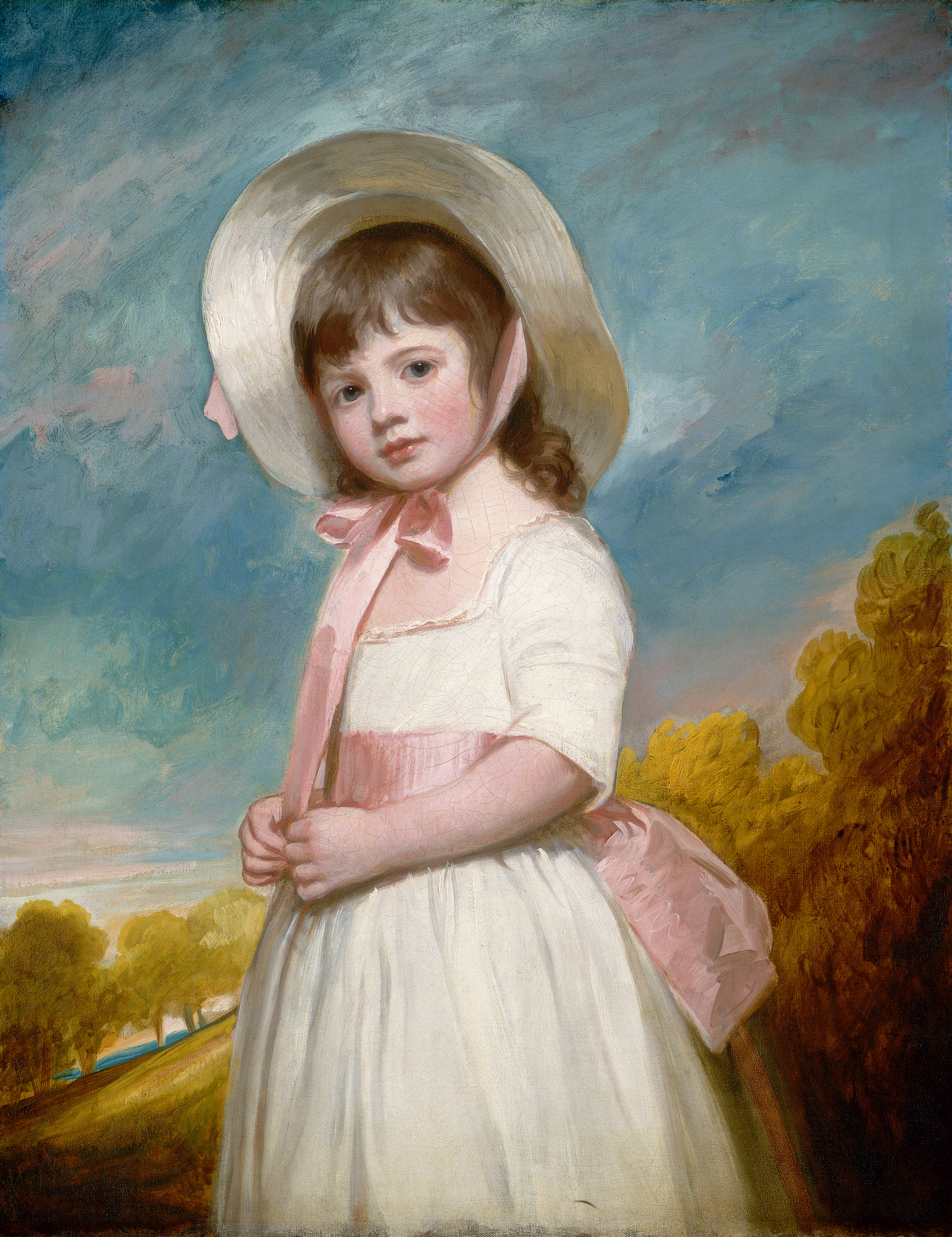
Portrait of Miss Juliana Willoughby (1781–1788)

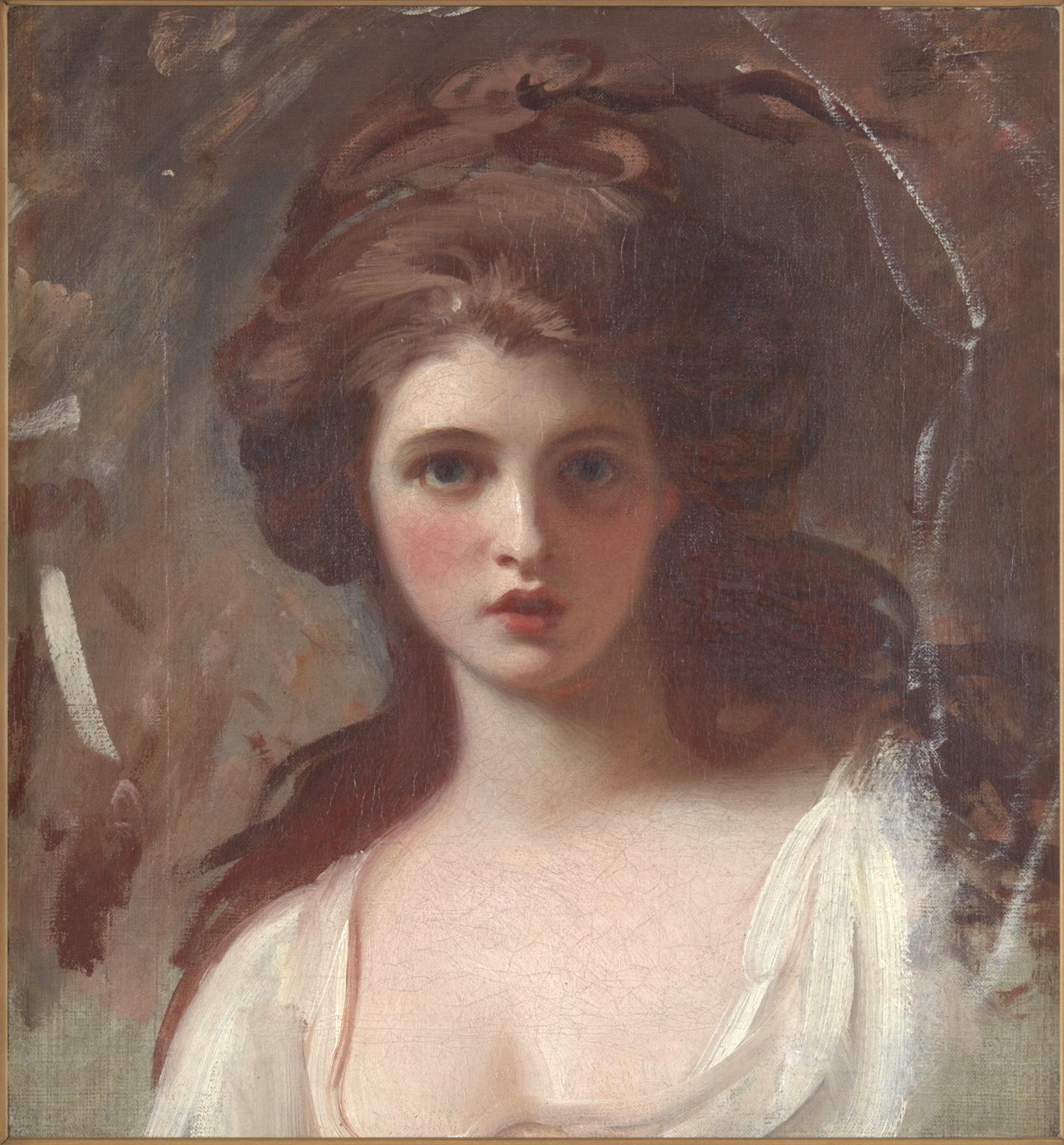
Lady Hamilton as Circe, c. 1782

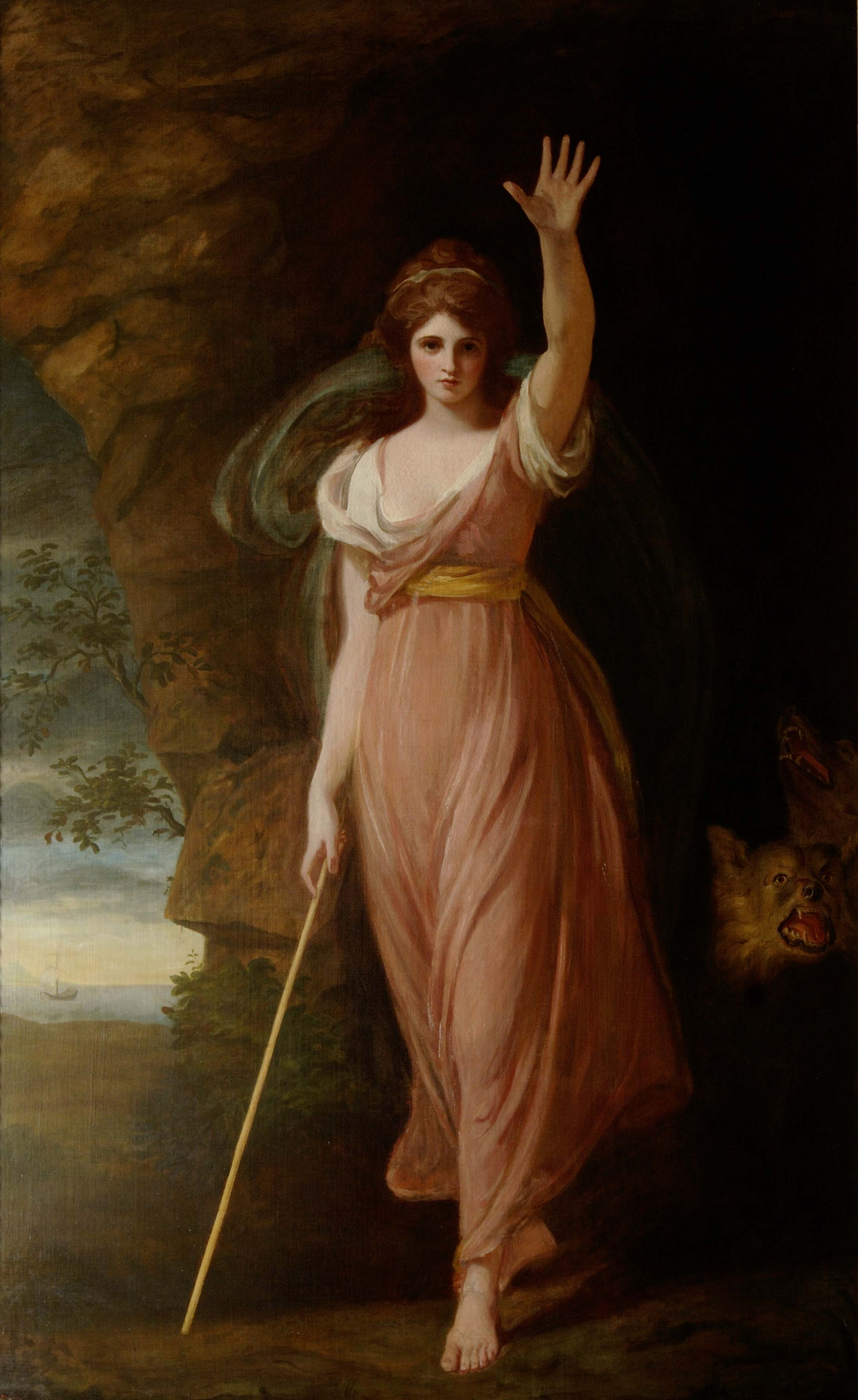
Emma Hart, Lady Hamilton as Circe (1782)

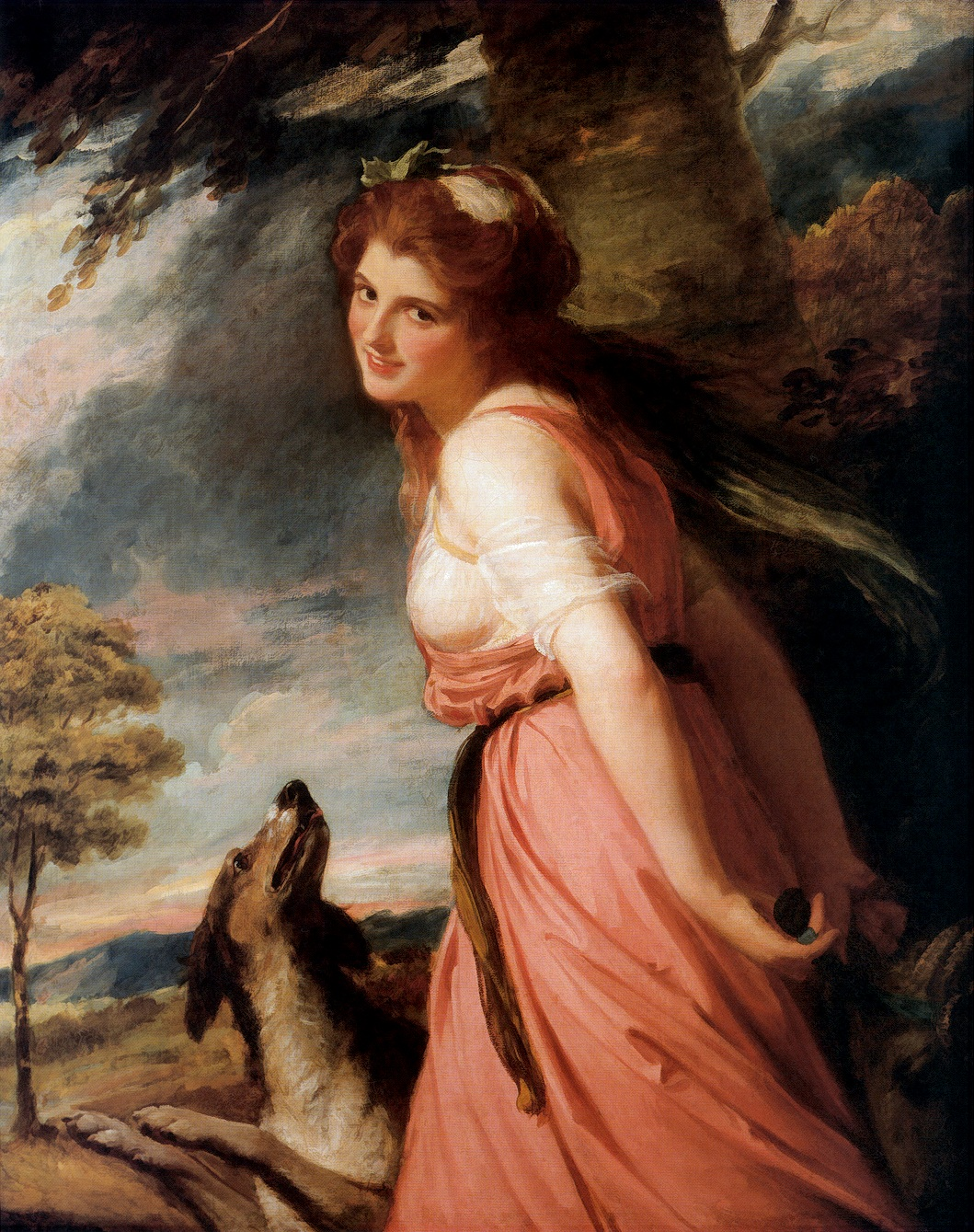
Emma Hamilton as a bacchante (1785)

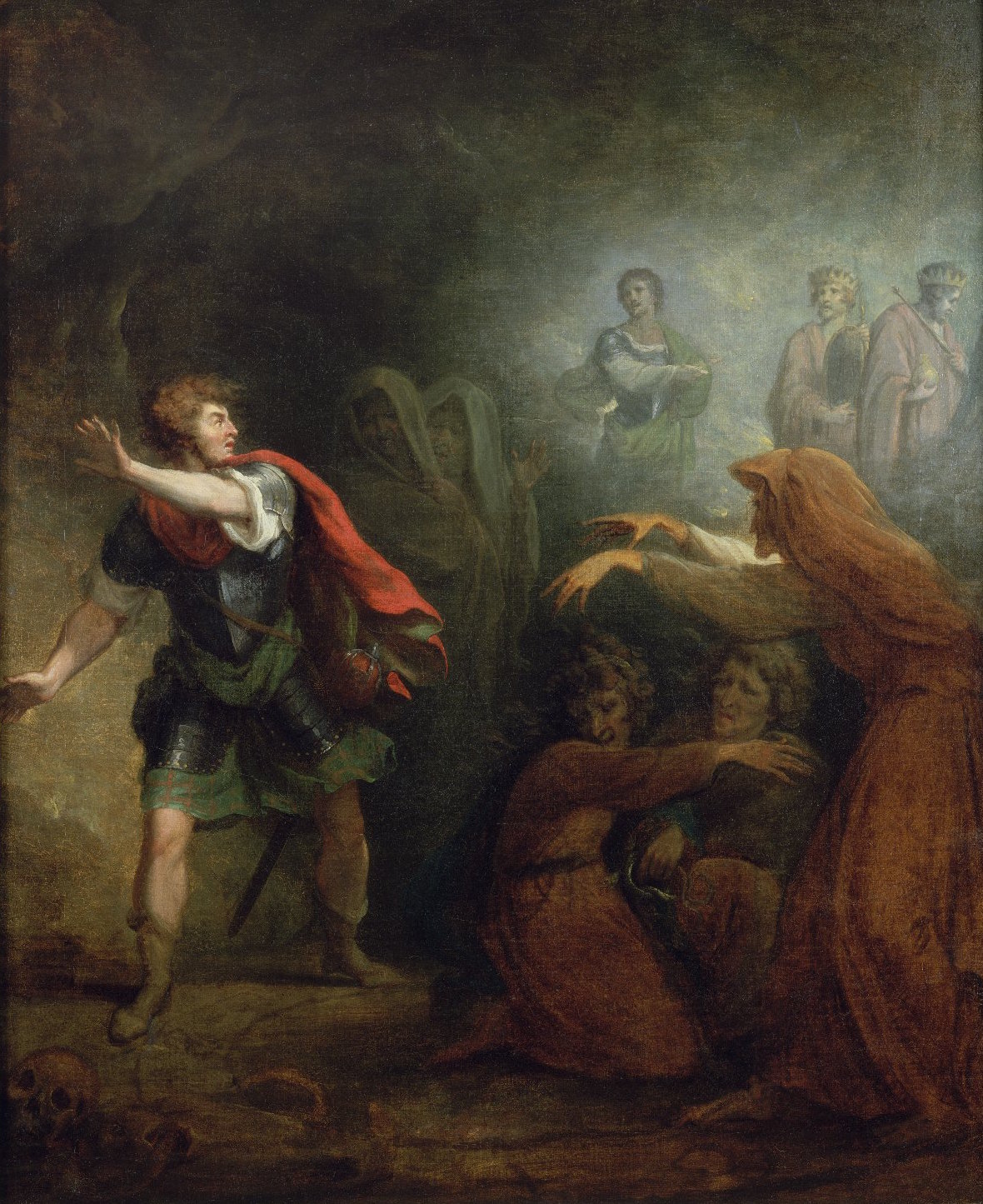
Macbeth and the witches (1785)

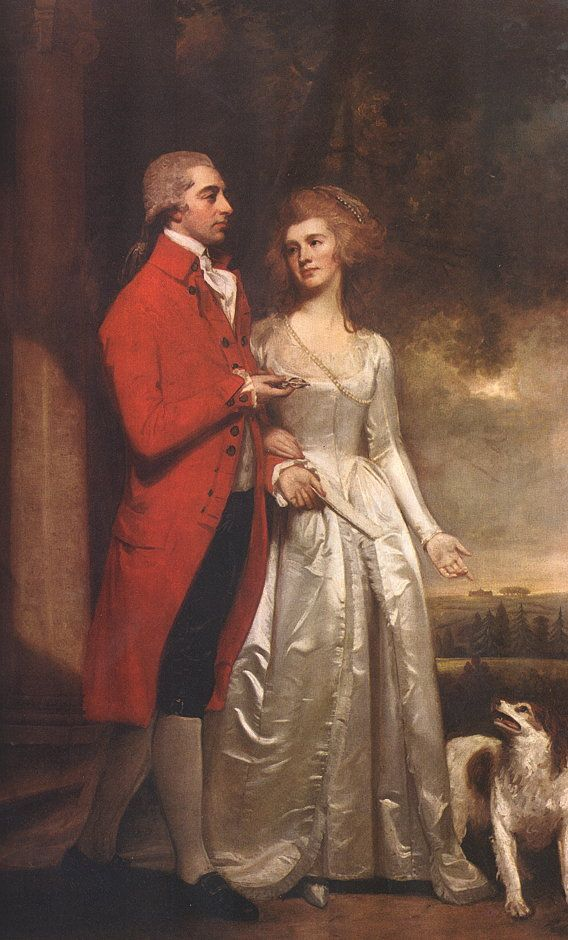
Sir Christopher and Lady Sykes (1786)

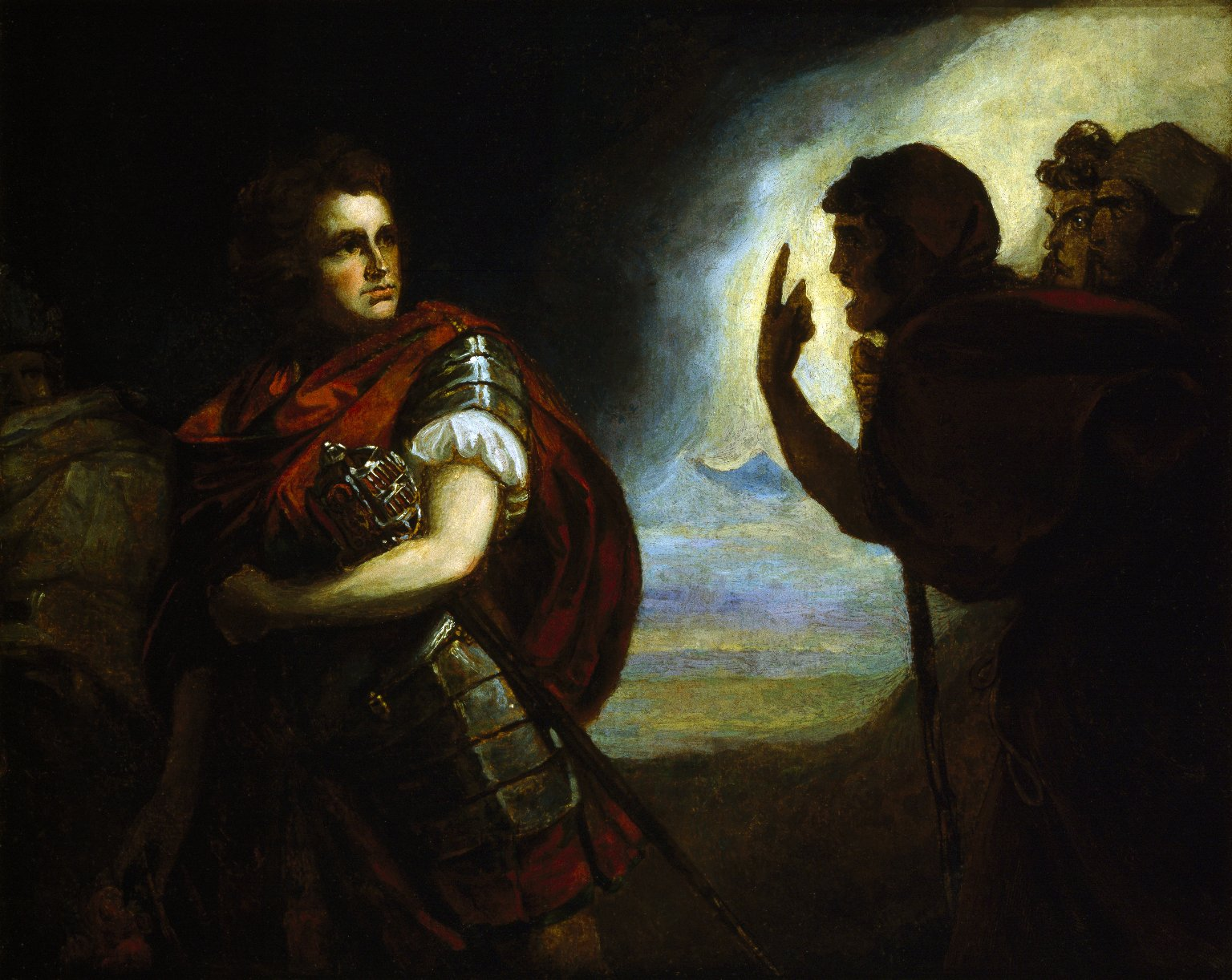
John Henderson as Macbeth (1787)

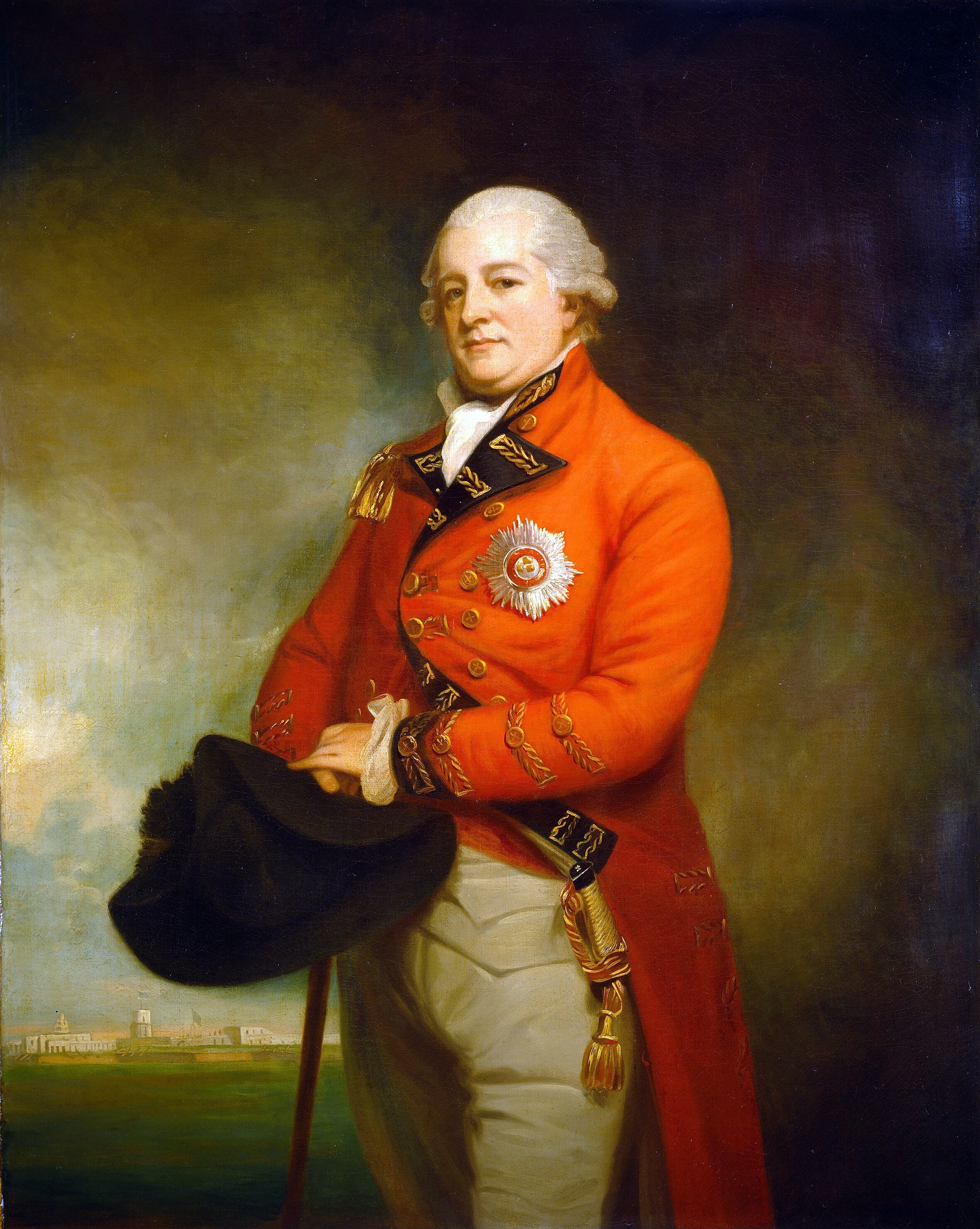
Major General Sir Archibald Campbell K.B. of Inverneill (1790–1792)

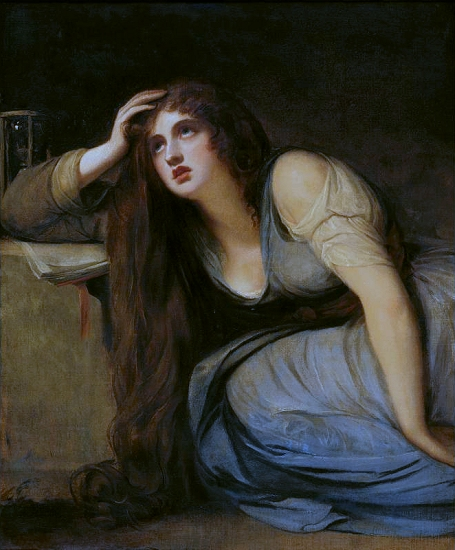
The Magdalene (before 1792)

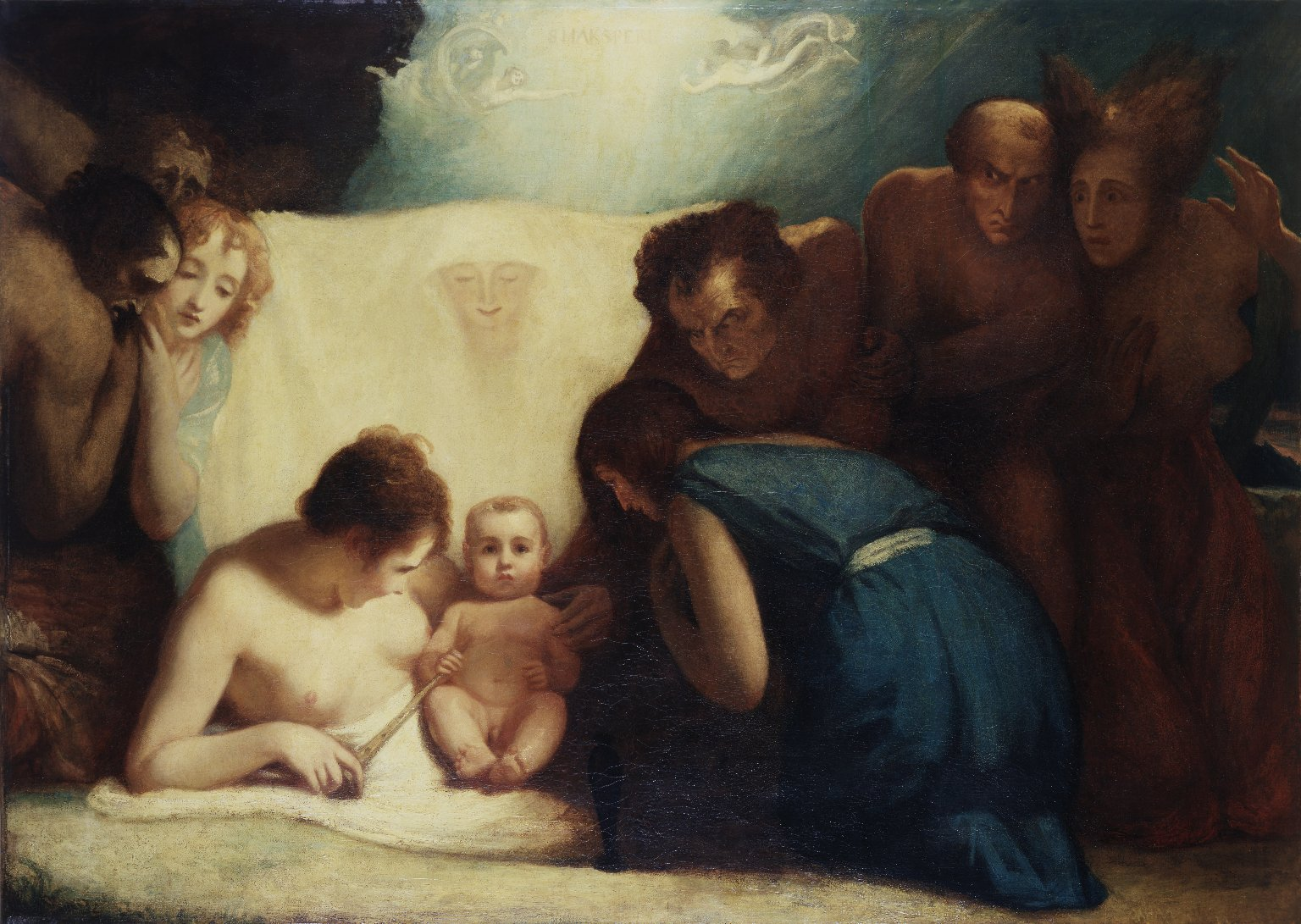
The infant Shakespeare attended by Nature and the Passions, (1791–1792)

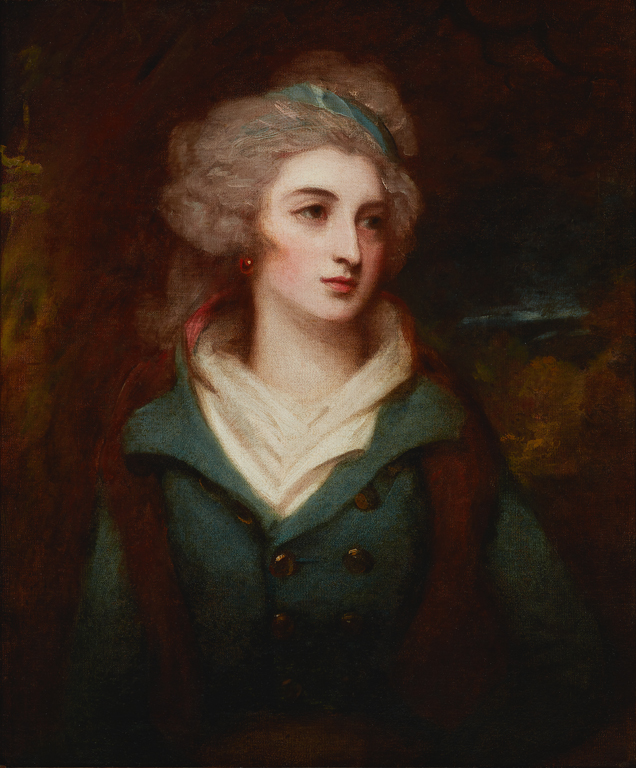
Miss Grace Ashburner (1792)

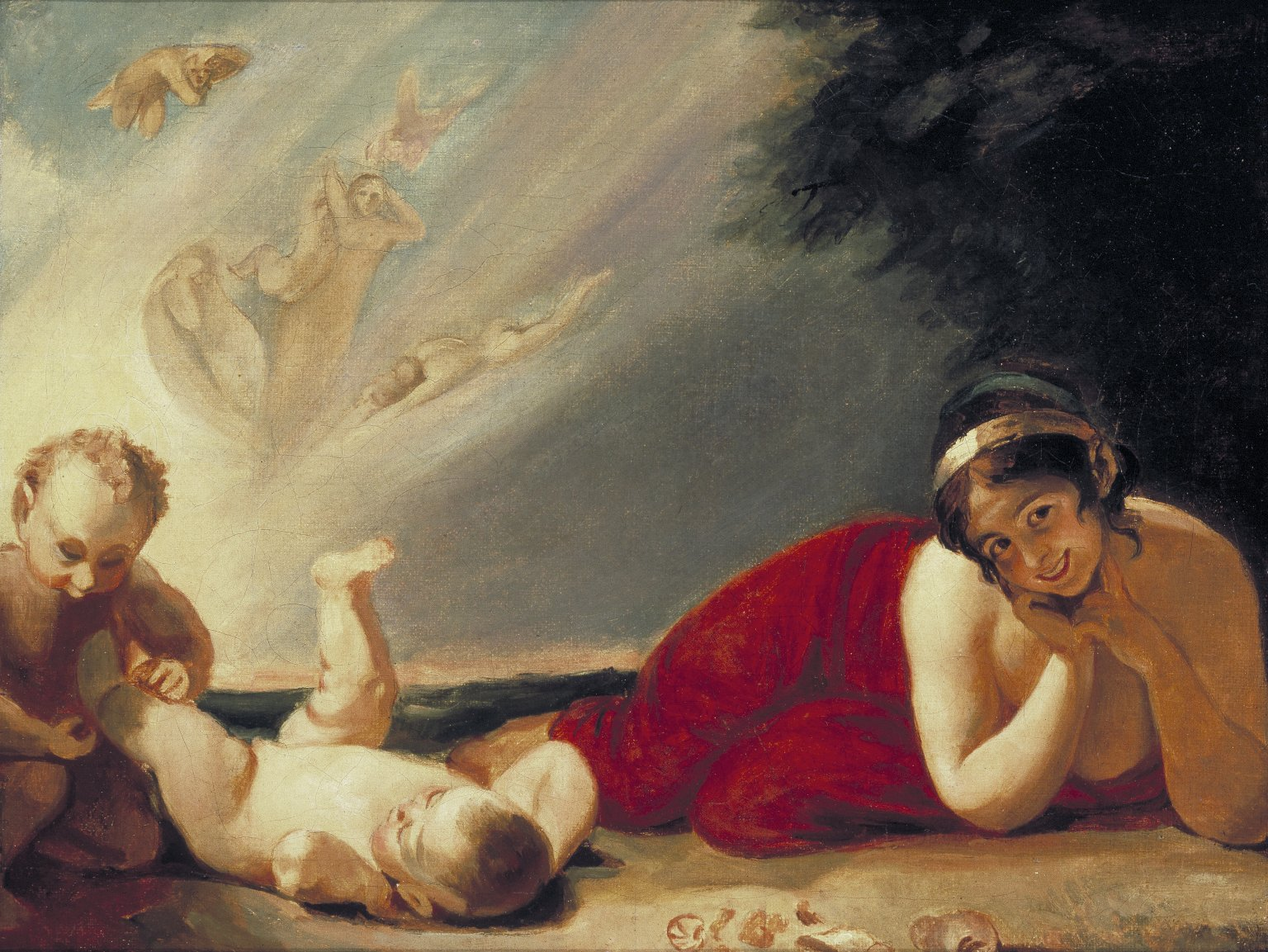
Lady Hamilton as Titania with Puck and Changeling (1793)

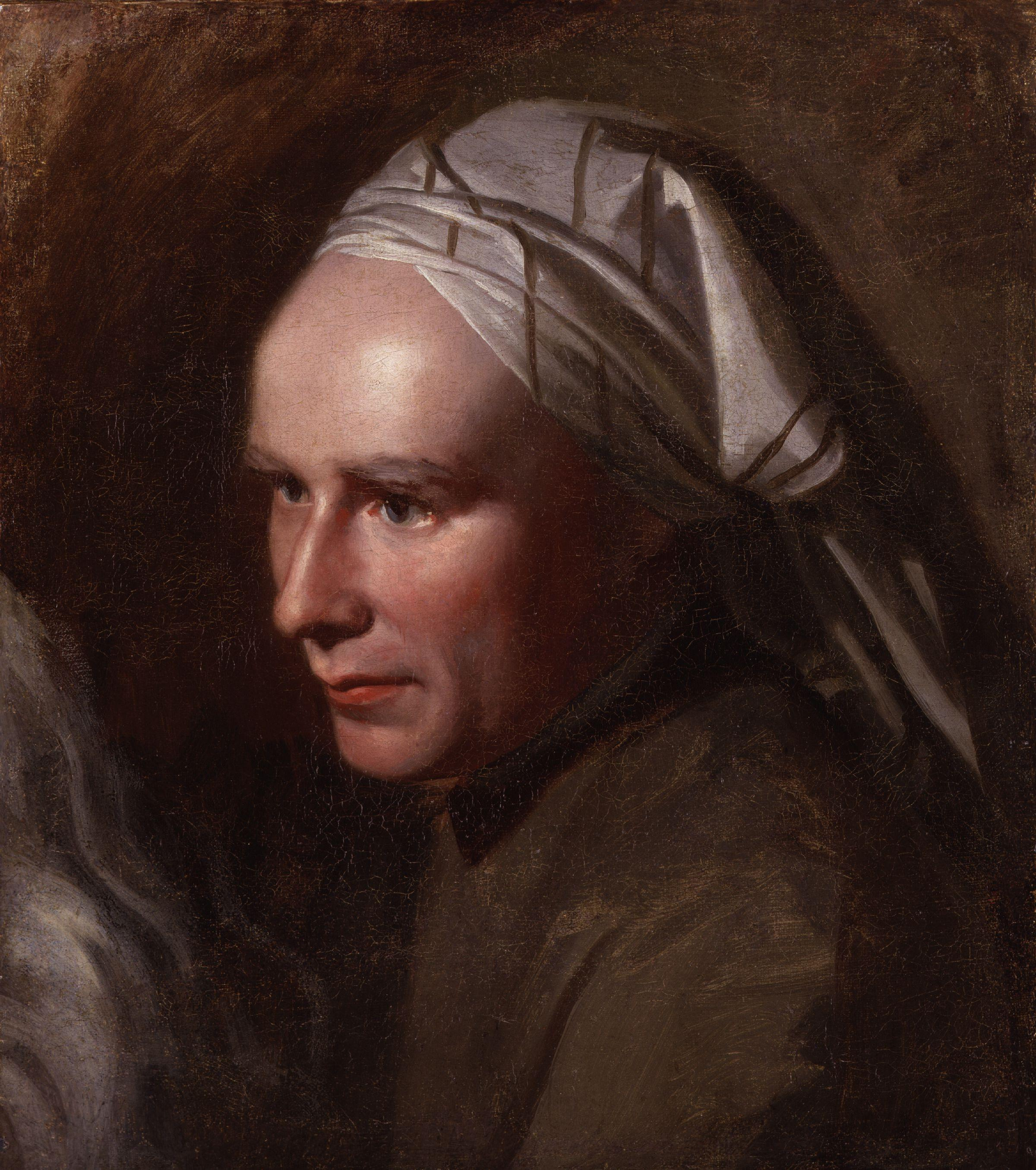
Thomas Greene

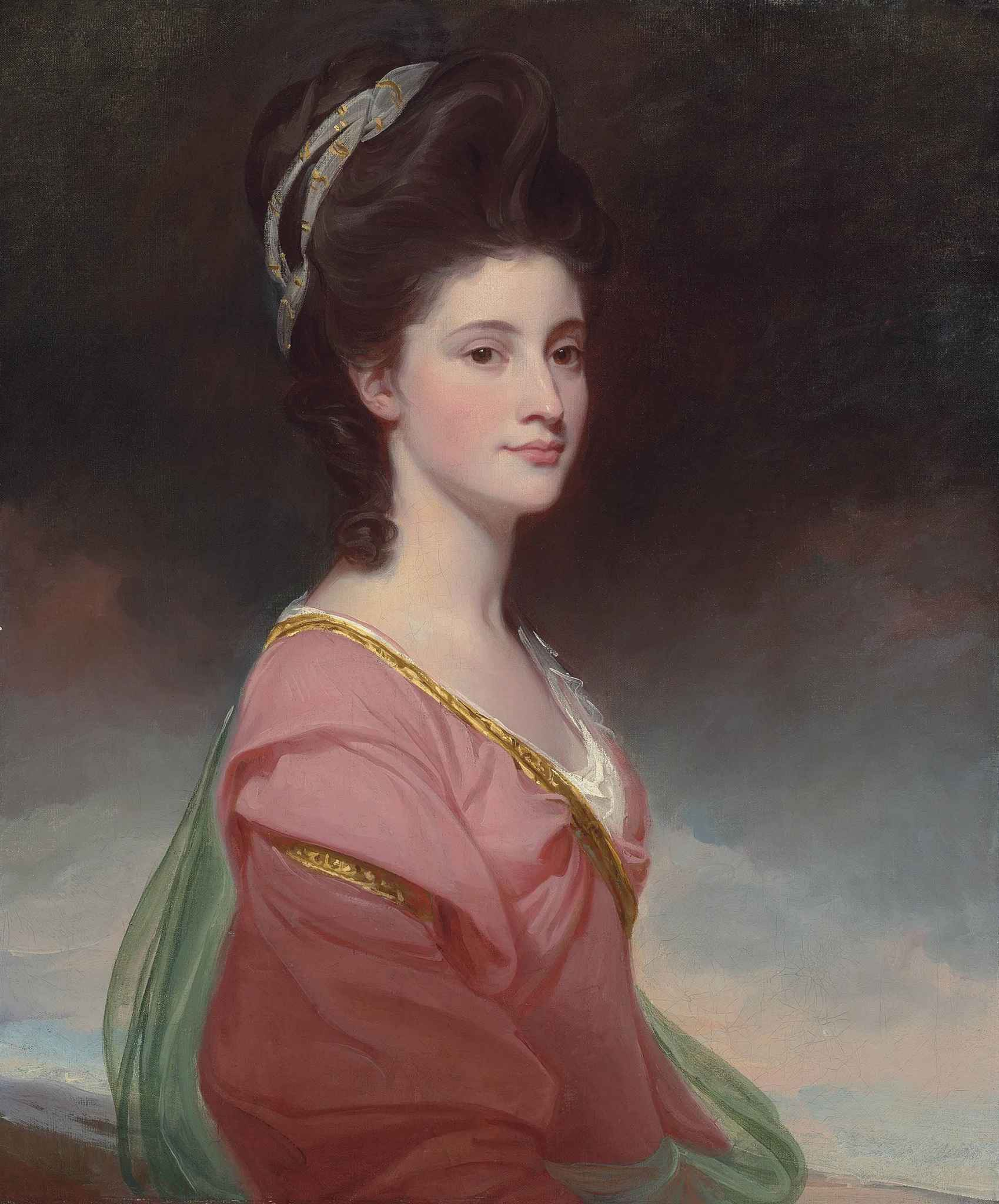
Portrait of Elizabeth Ramus

== See also ==
- English school of painting
