= Richard T. Slone =

English painter

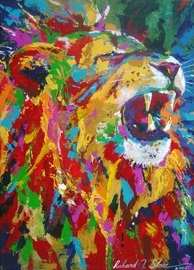
Courtesy Sloneart.com

Richard T. Slone is a British-born artist residing in the United States. He was born in 1974 in Newton-in-Furness, Lancashire, England.

== Career ==
T. Slone initially wanted to become a boxer. He moved to Philadelphia in 1990 and ultimately became an artist. Collectors of his works include Donald Trump, Pamela Anderson, Denzel Washington, and Eminem.
