= Dalton Castle, Cumbria =

Grade I listed tower and museum in Cumbria, England

Coordinates: 54.1554°N 3.1865°W

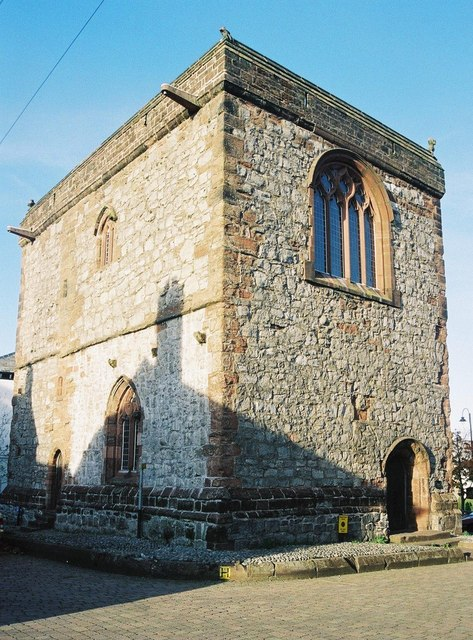
Dalton Castle, 2007

Dalton Castle is a Grade I listed 14th-century peel tower in Dalton-in-Furness, Cumbria, England. Constructed during a period of Scottish raids on Furness, it served as the administrative and judicial centre of the lordship of Furness Abbey, functioning as a courthouse and prison as well as a defensive structure. Following the Dissolution of the Monasteries in 1537, the castle remained in use as a courthouse for more than three centuries. It is a scheduled monument and has been owned by the National Trust since 1965.

== Description ==
Dalton Castle is located in Dalton-in-Furness, Cumbria, situated on a hill in Market Place, at the western end of the town's Market Street. It is a peel tower with walls around 1.8 metres (6 ft) thick, built of limestone rubble with red sandstone dressings. The rectangular tower survives as a two-storey structure, although corbels within the building indicate former floor levels. Architectural features include a spiral stair turret, medieval fireplaces and an ashlar parapet with surviving medieval details. Although the interior has been extensively altered, much of the medieval exterior remains intact.

The castle is now a Grade I listed building and a scheduled monument. It is owned by the National Trust and is open to visitors during the summer months. The site includes a display about local painter George Romney.

== History ==
The castle was probably constructed in the mid-14th century by the monks of Furness Abbey, during a period of Scottish raids on the Furness peninsula. Dalton was at the time the principal settlement of the Furness peninsula, and the castle served as the administrative and judicial centre of the abbey's lordship, combining defensive, judicial and custodial functions. The building housed the manorial court of Furness and also functioned as a prison.

Following the Dissolution of the Monasteries in 1537, the castle passed from Furness Abbey to the Crown and continued to be used as a courthouse for more than three centuries. The building was repaired in 1545, remodelled around 1704, substantially altered by the architects Sharpe and Paley in 1856, and reroofed in 1907. Ownership later passed through a succession of aristocratic families before the 8th Duke of Buccleuch donated the castle to the National Trust in 1965.

== See also ==
- Listed buildings in Dalton Town with Newton
