= Copeland Borough Council elections =

Local government elections in Cumbria, England

Copeland Borough Council in Cumbria, England was elected every four years.

The council was established in 1974 and abolished in 2023.

== Political control ==
The first election to the council was held in 1973, initially operating as a shadow authority alongside the outgoing authorities until the new arrangements came into effect on 1 April 1974. Political control of the council from 1974 until its abolition in 2023 was as follows:

| Party in control | Years |
|---|---|
| Labour | 1974–1976 |
| No overall control | 1976–1979 |
| Labour | 1979–2023 |

=== Leadership ===
Prior to 2015, political leadership was provided by the leader of the council. The leader from 2003 to 2015 was:

| Councillor | Party | From | To |
|---|---|---|---|
| Elaine Woodburn | Labour | 2003 | 10 May 2015 |

In 2015 the council changed to having a directly-elected mayor. The mayor from 2015 until the council's abolition in 2023 was Mike Starkie, who was elected in 2015 and 2019 as an independent, but subsequently joined the Conservatives in June 2020. (Note: Mayoral terms of office ran from the fourth day after polling day.)

| Mayor | Party | From | To |
|---|---|---|---|
| Mike Starkie | Independent | 11 May 2015 | 22 Jun 2020 |
| Mike Starkie | Conservative | 22 Jun 2020 | 31 Mar 2023 |

== Council elections ==
- 1973 Copeland Borough Council election
- 1976 Copeland Borough Council election
- 1979 Copeland Borough Council election (New ward boundaries)
- 1983 Copeland Borough Council election
- 1987 Copeland Borough Council election
- 1991 Copeland Borough Council election
- 1995 Copeland Borough Council election
- 1999 Copeland Borough Council election (New ward boundaries)
- 2003 Copeland Borough Council election
- 2007 Copeland Borough Council election
- 2011 Copeland Borough Council election
- 2015 Copeland Borough Council election
- 2019 Copeland Borough Council election (New ward boundaries)

== Borough result maps ==
2003 results map

2007 results map

2011 results map

2015 results map

2019 results map

== By-election results ==
=== 1995-1999 ===
Hillcrest By-Election 1 May 1997
| Party | Candidate | Votes | % | ±% |
|---|---|---|---|---|
| Conservative | | 1,113 | 52.1 | +13.3 |
| Labour | | 1,025 | 47.9 | −13.3 |
| Majority | | 88 | 4.2 | |
| Turnout | | 2,138 | | |
| Conservative gain from Labour | | Swing | | |

Egremont North By-Election 10 July 1997
| Party | Candidate | Votes | % | ±% |
|---|---|---|---|---|
| Labour | | 470 | 68.1 | −7.3 |
| Conservative | | 164 | 23.9 | −0.7 |
| Liberal Democrats | | 55 | 8.0 | +8.0 |
| Majority | | 305 | 44.2 | |
| Turnout | | 690 | | |
| Labour hold | | Swing | | |

Harbour By-Election 10 July 1997
| Party | Candidate | Votes | % | ±% |
|---|---|---|---|---|
| Labour | | 442 | 58.0 | +4.5 |
| Conservative | | 320 | 42.0 | +20.8 |
| Majority | | 122 | 16.0 | |
| Turnout | | 762 | | |
| Labour hold | | Swing | | |

Haverigg By-Election 10 July 1997
| Party | Candidate | Votes | % | ±% |
|---|---|---|---|---|
| Conservative | | 230 | 64.4 | +11.4 |
| Labour | | 91 | 25.6 | −21.2 |
| Liberal Democrats | | 35 | 9.8 | +9.8 |
| Majority | | 139 | 38.8 | |
| Turnout | | 356 | | |
| Conservative hold | | Swing | | |

Kells By-Election 10 July 1997
| Party | Candidate | Votes | % | ±% |
|---|---|---|---|---|
| Labour | | 229 | 73.2 | −13.9 |
| Conservative | | 84 | 26.8 | +13.9 |
| Majority | | 145 | 46.4 | |
| Turnout | | 313 | | |
| Labour hold | | Swing | | |

Newtown By-Election 6 November 1997
| Party | Candidate | Votes | % | ±% |
|---|---|---|---|---|
| Conservative | | 597 | 51.8 | +7.2 |
| Liberal Democrats | | 376 | 32.6 | +32.6 |
| Labour | | 180 | 15.6 | −25.3 |
| Majority | | 221 | 19.2 | |
| Turnout | | 1,153 | 40.8 | |
| Conservative hold | | Swing | | |

Holborn Hill By-Election 26 March 1998
| Party | Candidate | Votes | % | ±% |
|---|---|---|---|---|
| Conservative | | 407 | 57.4 | |
| Labour | | 302 | 42.6 | |
| Majority | | 105 | 14.8 | |
| Turnout | | 709 | 31.0 | |
| Conservative gain from Labour | | Swing | | |

=== 1999-2003 ===
Mirehouse By-Election 4 May 2000
| Party | Candidate | Votes | % | ±% |
|---|---|---|---|---|
| Labour | | 817 | 79.7 | +2.6 |
| Conservative | | 208 | 20.3 | +20.3 |
| Majority | | 609 | 59.4 | |
| Turnout | | 1,025 | 29.5 | |
| Labour hold | | Swing | | |

=== 2003-2007 ===
Harbour By-Election 10 June 2004
| Party | Candidate | Votes | % | ±% |
|---|---|---|---|---|
| Labour | Anne Bradshaw | 480 | 41.0 | −21.6 |
| Conservative | Richard Maley | 387 | 33.0 | −4.4 |
| Liberal Democrats | Francis Hollowell | 304 | 26.0 | +26.0 |
| Majority | | 93 | 8.0 | |
| Turnout | | 1,171 | 37.0 | |
| Labour hold | | Swing | | |

Cleator Moor North By-Election 6 April 2006
| Party | Candidate | Votes | % | ±% |
|---|---|---|---|---|
| Labour | Hugh Branney | 307 | 61.6 | +15.0 |
| Independent | Lauren Mossop | 191 | 38.4 | −15.0 |
| Majority | | 116 | 23.2 | |
| Turnout | | 498 | 15.4 | |
| Labour gain from Independent | | Swing | | |

Gosforth By-Election 6 April 2006
| Party | Candidate | Votes | % | ±% |
|---|---|---|---|---|
| Conservative | Alan Jacob | 264 | 64.2 | −7.7 |
| Labour | Christine Cornall | 85 | 20.7 | −7.4 |
| Liberal Democrats | Mike Minogue | 62 | 15.1 | +15.1 |
| Majority | | 179 | 43.5 | |
| Turnout | | 411 | 34.9 | |
| Conservative hold | | Swing | | |

Hensingham By-Election 6 April 2006
| Party | Candidate | Votes | % | ±% |
|---|---|---|---|---|
| Labour | Geoffrey Garrity | 385 | 61.1 | −10.6 |
| Conservative | Alexander Carroll | 207 | 32.9 | +4.6 |
| Liberal Democrats | Frank Hollowell | 38 | 6.0 | +6.0 |
| Majority | | 178 | 28.2 | |
| Turnout | | 630 | 19.8 | |
| Labour hold | | Swing | | |

=== 2007-2011 ===
Harbour By-Election 20 September 2007
| Party | Candidate | Votes | % | ±% |
|---|---|---|---|---|
| Labour | Jeanette Williams | 463 | 44.3 | −17.1 |
| Conservative | Brigid Whiteside | 337 | 32.2 | −6.4 |
| BNP | Bill Pugh | 245 | 23.4 | +23.4 |
| Majority | | 126 | 12.1 | |
| Turnout | | 1,045 | 31.5 | |
| Labour hold | | Swing | | |

=== 2011-2015 ===
Hensingham By-Election 2 May 2013
| Party | Candidate | Votes | % | ±% |
|---|---|---|---|---|
| Labour | Allan Forster | 670 | 75.0 | +4.3 |
| Conservative | Genna Martin | 223 | 25.0 | −4.3 |
| Majority | | 447 | 50.1 | |
| Turnout | | | 28.3 | |
| Labour hold | | Swing | | |

=== 2015-2019 ===
Newtown By-Election 8 June 2017
| Party | Candidate | Votes | % | ±% |
|---|---|---|---|---|
| Conservative | Gerard James McGrath | 954 | 61.4 | −9.6 |
| Labour | Angela Dixon | 601 | 38.6 | +16.4 |
| Majority | | 353 | 22.7 | |
| Turnout | | 1,555 | 59.7 | |
| Conservative hold | | Swing | | |

Egremont South By-Election 2 November 2017
| Party | Candidate | Votes | % | ±% |
|---|---|---|---|---|
| Labour | Tom Higgins | 354 | 52.4 | +15.7 |
| Conservative | Jeff Hailes | 321 | 47.6 | +26.8 |
| Majority | | 33 | 4.9 | |
| Turnout | | 675 | 23.8 | |
| Labour hold | | Swing | | |

=== 2019-2023 ===
Whitehaven Central By-Election 6 May 2021
| Party | Candidate | Votes | % | ±% |
|---|---|---|---|---|
| Labour | Joseph Ghayouba | 633 | 47.7 | +13.5 |
| Conservative | William R. C. S. Dixon | 542 | 40.8 | +13.0 |
| Independent | Richard Donnan | 90 | 6.8 | +6.8 |
| Heritage | William R. Dixon | 45 | 3.4 | +3.4 |
| Liberal Democrats | Mike Minogue | 18 | 1.4 | +1.4 |
| Majority | | 91 | 6.9 | |
| Turnout | | 1,328 | | |
| Labour hold | | Swing | | |
