= 2027 Cumbria mayoral election =

Mayoral election

- 6 May 2027
Candidate	Finley O'prey	Mike Starkie	David Allen
Party	Restore Britain (UK)	Conservative	Labour Co-op
Incumbent Mayor
Position established

The 2027 Cumbria mayoral election is due to be held on 6 May 2027, to elect the inaugural mayor of Cumbria who will lead the Cumbria Combined Authority. It will be held at the same time as other local elections in the United Kingdom, including the elections to Cumbria's two constituent councils of Westmorland and Furness and Cumberland.

== Candidates ==
=== Declared ===
- Mike Starkie, former Mayor of Copeland, was selected as the Conservative Party candidate.
- Dr Mark Borthwick, an environment policy researcher working professionally on food and farming campaigns, was selected as the Green Party of England and Wales candidate.
- Libby Bateman, a former Cumbria County Council councillor, was selected as the Liberal Democrat candidate.
- David Allen, the incumbent Cumbria Police, Fire and Crime Commissioner, was selected as the Labour and Co-operative Party candidate.
- Finley O'prey, a young 17 year old entering politics, was Selected as the Restore Britain Candidate

=== Potential ===
- Rory Stewart, former Cabinet minister and Member of Parliament for Penrith and The Border, has not ruled out standing as a candidate.
