= Cumberland Council elections =

Local government elections in Cumbria, England

All 46 members of Cumberland Council, a unitary authority in England, are elected every four years.

== Council elections ==
Year	Seats	Labour	Conservative	Liberal Democrats	Independent	Green	Council control after election
2022	46	30	7	4	3	2	Labour

== District result maps ==
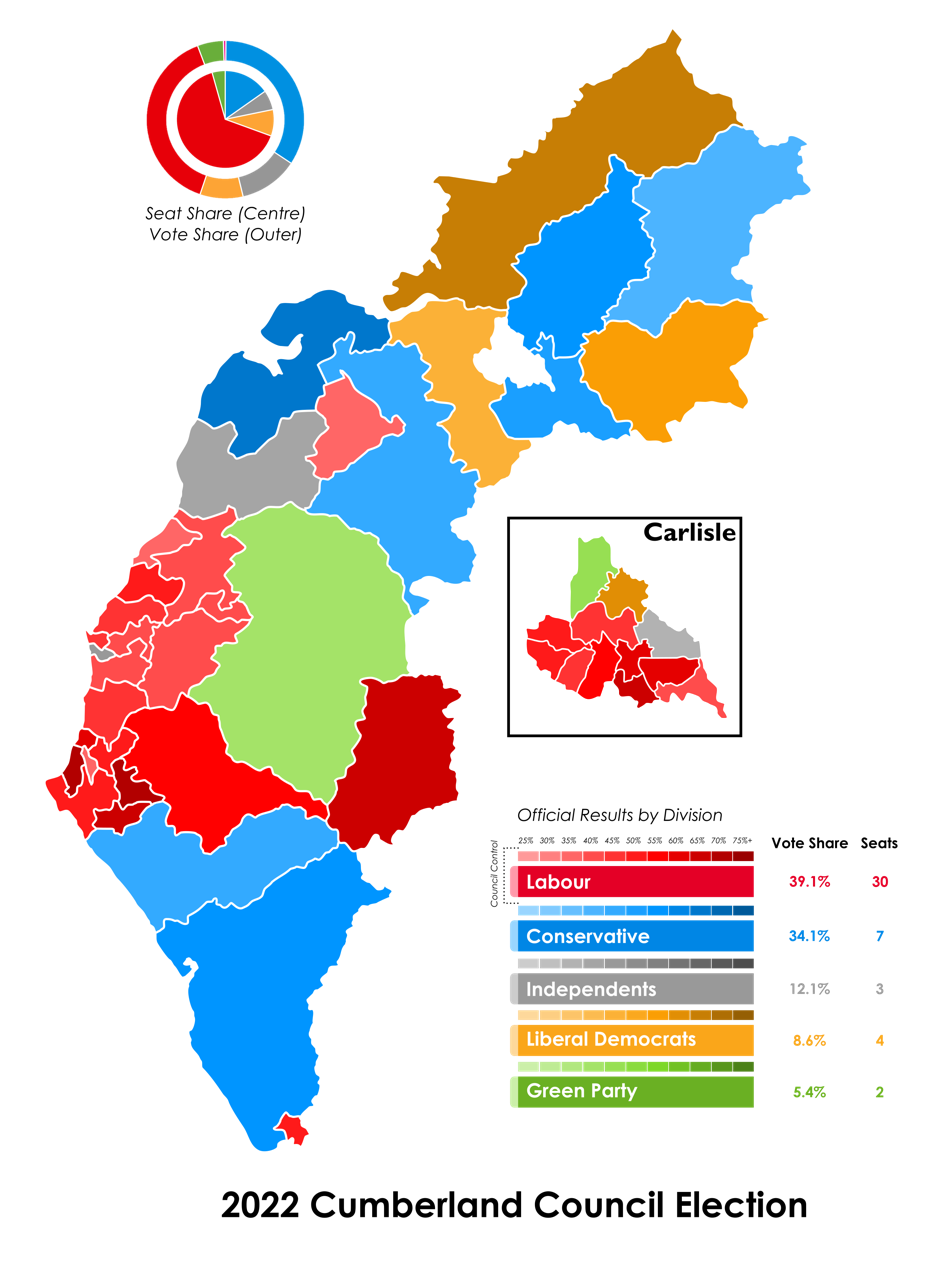
2022 results map

== By-election results ==
=== 2022-2026 ===
Harraby North by-election, 27 June 2024
Party	Candidate	Votes	%	±%
Labour	Justin McDermott	455	60.5	−4.1
Conservative	Rob Currie	165	21.9	−9.0
Liberal Democrats	Sarah Wills	70	9.3	+9.3
Green	Peri Conner	62	8.2	+8.2
Majority		290	38.6	
Turnout		752		
Labour hold		Swing		

Keswick by-election, 17 October 2024
Party	Candidate	Votes	%	±%
Labour	Sally Lansbury	513	50.7	−17.2
Conservative	Graham King	384	38.0	+22.0
Green	Jane Hall	85	8.4	+8.4
Liberal Democrats	John Rivers	29	2.9	+2.9
Majority		129	12.8	
Turnout		1,011		
Labour hold		Swing		

Wetheral by-election, 17 October 2024
Party	Candidate	Votes	%	±%
Conservative	Gareth Ellis	665	51.6	−1.7
Liberal Democrats	Sarah Wills	463	35.9	+16.8
Labour	Ruth Alcroft	160	12.4	−15.2
Majority		202	15.7	
Turnout		1,288		
Conservative hold		Swing		

Harraby South by-election, 20 August 2026
Party	Candidate	Votes	%	±%
Reform	Josh Kirkwood	560	42.5	+42.5
Labour	Ruth Alcroft	469	35.6	−5.3
Conservative	Rob Currie	236	17.9	−17.4
Green	Rose-Ellen Kemp	29	2.2	+2.2
Liberal Democrats	Stuart Kelly	23	1.7	+1.7
Majority		91	6.9	
Turnout		1,317		
Reform gain from Labour		Swing		
