= Westmorland and Furness Council =

Local authority of Westmorland and Furness, England

- Council logo

Type
- Type: Unitary authority

History
- Founded: 1 April 2023

Leadership
- Chair: Doug Rathbone, Liberal Democrats since 7 May 2025
- Leader: Jonathan Brook, Liberal Democrats since 1 April 2023
- Chief Executive: Miranda Cannon since 12 January 2026

Structure
- Seats: 65 councillors
- Graph of the party split among 65 seats.
- Political groups: Administration (35) Liberal Democrats (35) Other parties (30) Labour (15) Conservative (9) Green (1) Reform (1) Independent (4)
- Length of term: 4 years

Elections
- Voting system: First past the post
- Last election: 5 May 2022
- Next election: 6 May 2027

Meeting place
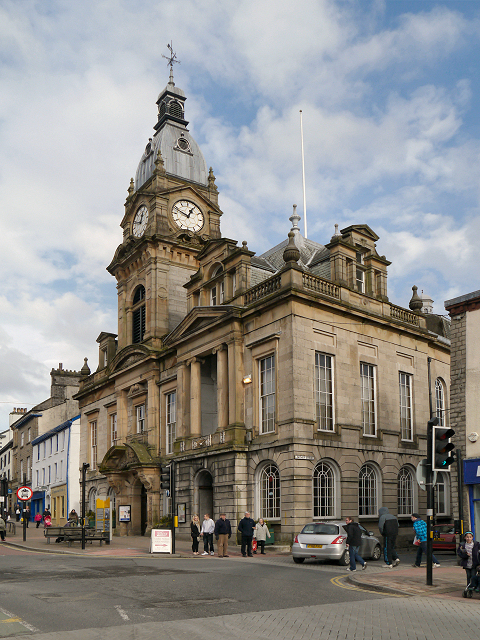
- Town Hall, Kendal

Website
- www.westmorlandandfurness.gov.uk

Westmorland and Furness Council is the local authority for Westmorland and Furness, a local government district in the ceremonial county of Cumbria, England. It is a unitary authority, being a district council which also performs the functions of a county council. The council has been under Liberal Democrat majority control since its creation in 2023. It has its official headquarters at the Town Hall and adjoining South Lakeland House in Kendal, with additional offices in Barrow-in-Furness and Penrith. The council is a constituent member of Cumbria Combined Authority.

== History ==
The district of Westmorland and Furness and its council were created in 2023. The district covers the combined area of the former districts of Barrow-in-Furness, Eden and South Lakeland. The new council took over the functions of the three former district councils plus those of the abolished Cumbria County Council within the area. Legally, Westmorland and Furness is both a non-metropolitan district and a non-metropolitan county, but there is no separate county council; instead the district council also performs the functions of a county council, making it a unitary authority. For the purposes of lieutenancy and shrievalty, Westmorland and Furness remains part of the ceremonial county of Cumbria.

The inaugural election to the new council was held on 5 May 2022. It initially operated as a shadow authority alongside the outgoing authorities until 1 April 2023, when the new district and its council formally came into being.

In February 2026, the Cumbria Combined Authority was created to oversee certain strategic issues across both Westmorland and Furness and neighbouring Cumberland.

== Governance ==
Westmorland and Furness Council provides both district-level and county-level services. The whole area is also covered by civil parishes, which form an additional tier of local government.

Much of the west of the district lies within the Lake District National Park, and south-eastern parts of the district lie within the Yorkshire Dales National Park. In those areas, town and country planning is the responsibility of the national park authorities. Westmorland and Furness Council appoints six of its councillors to serve on the 20-person Lake District National Park Authority, and three of its councillors to serve on the 25-person Yorkshire Dales National Park Authority.

The council is one of two constituent members of the Cumbria Combined Authority, along with Cumberland Council.

=== Political control ===
The council has been under Liberal Democrat majority control since its creation.

Party in control	Years
Liberal Democrats	2023–present

=== Leadership ===
Political leadership is provided by the leader of the council. The first leader is Jonathan Brook, a Liberal Democrat, who was also the last leader of South Lakeland District Council.

Councillor	Party	From	To
Jonathan Brook	Liberal Democrats	1 Apr 2023	

=== Composition ===
Following the 2022 election, and subsequent by-elections and changes of allegiance up to June 2026, the composition of the council was:

Party	Councillors
Liberal Democrats	35
Labour	15
Conservative	9
Green	1
Reform	1
Independent	4
Total	65

Two of the independent councillors sit in a group with the Green councillor. The next election is due in 2027.

== Elections ==
The council comprises 65 councillors representing 33 wards, with each ward electing one, two or three councillors. Elections are to be held every four years from 2027.

== Premises ==
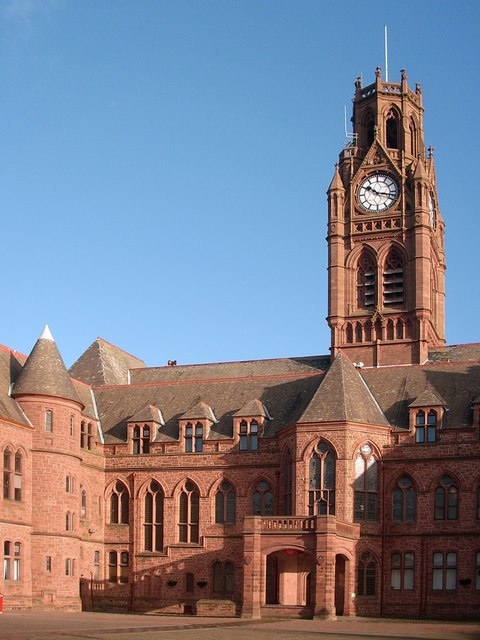
Barrow-in-Furness Town Hall: One of the council's three main offices

The council has its official headquarters at Kendal Town Hall and the adjoining South Lakeland House at the junction of Highgate and Lowther Street in the centre of Kendal. Other buildings are at Barrow-in-Furness Town Hall and Voreda House in Penrith.

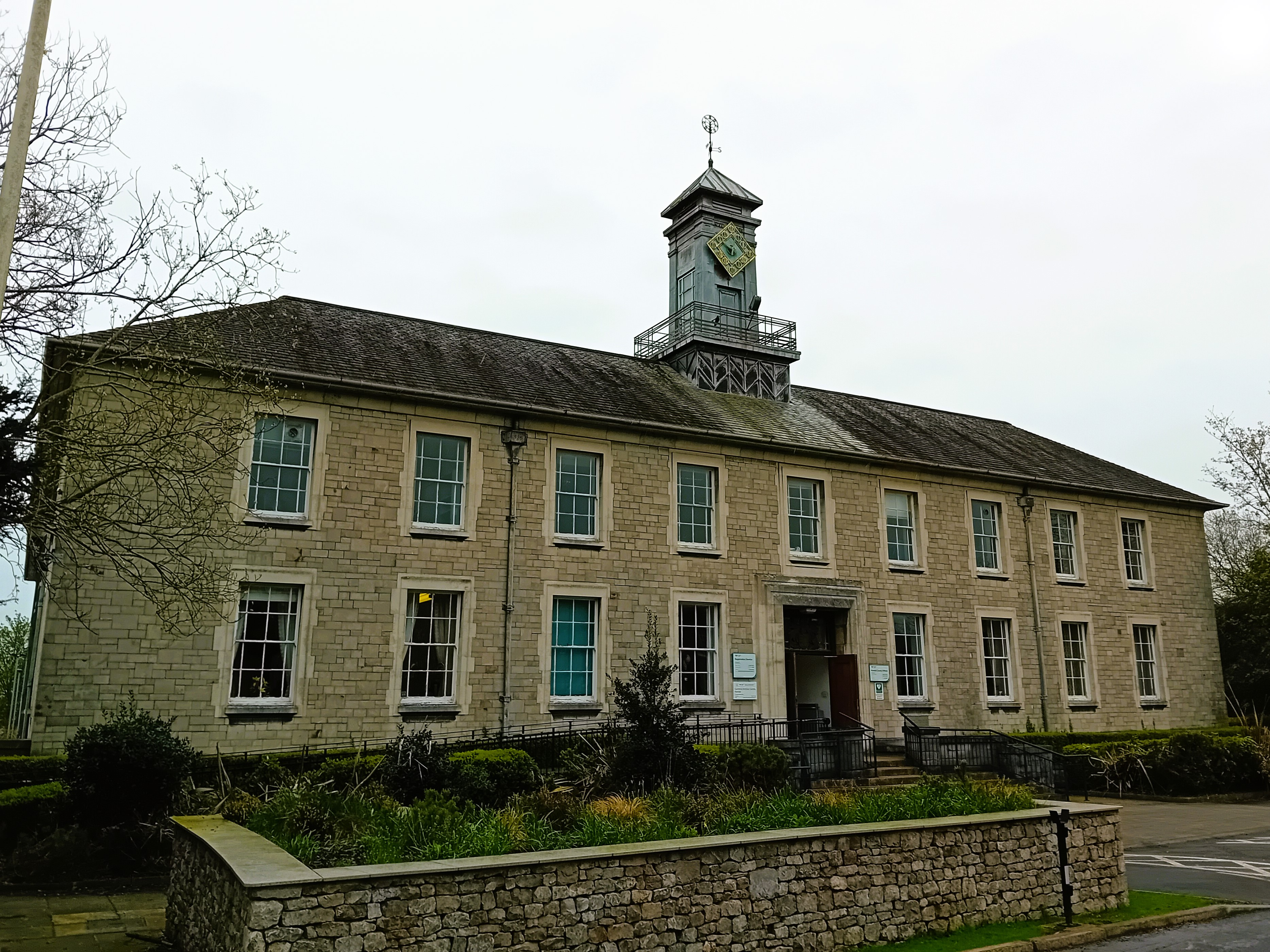
County Hall, Kendal: Used for full council meetings until 2024

Full council meetings were initially held at County Hall in Kendal, the former headquarters of Westmorland County Council, which had been built in 1939. In June 2024 the council decided to close County Hall in September 2024 and move meetings to Kendal Town Hall.
