= John Stevenson (British politician) =

British Conservative politician

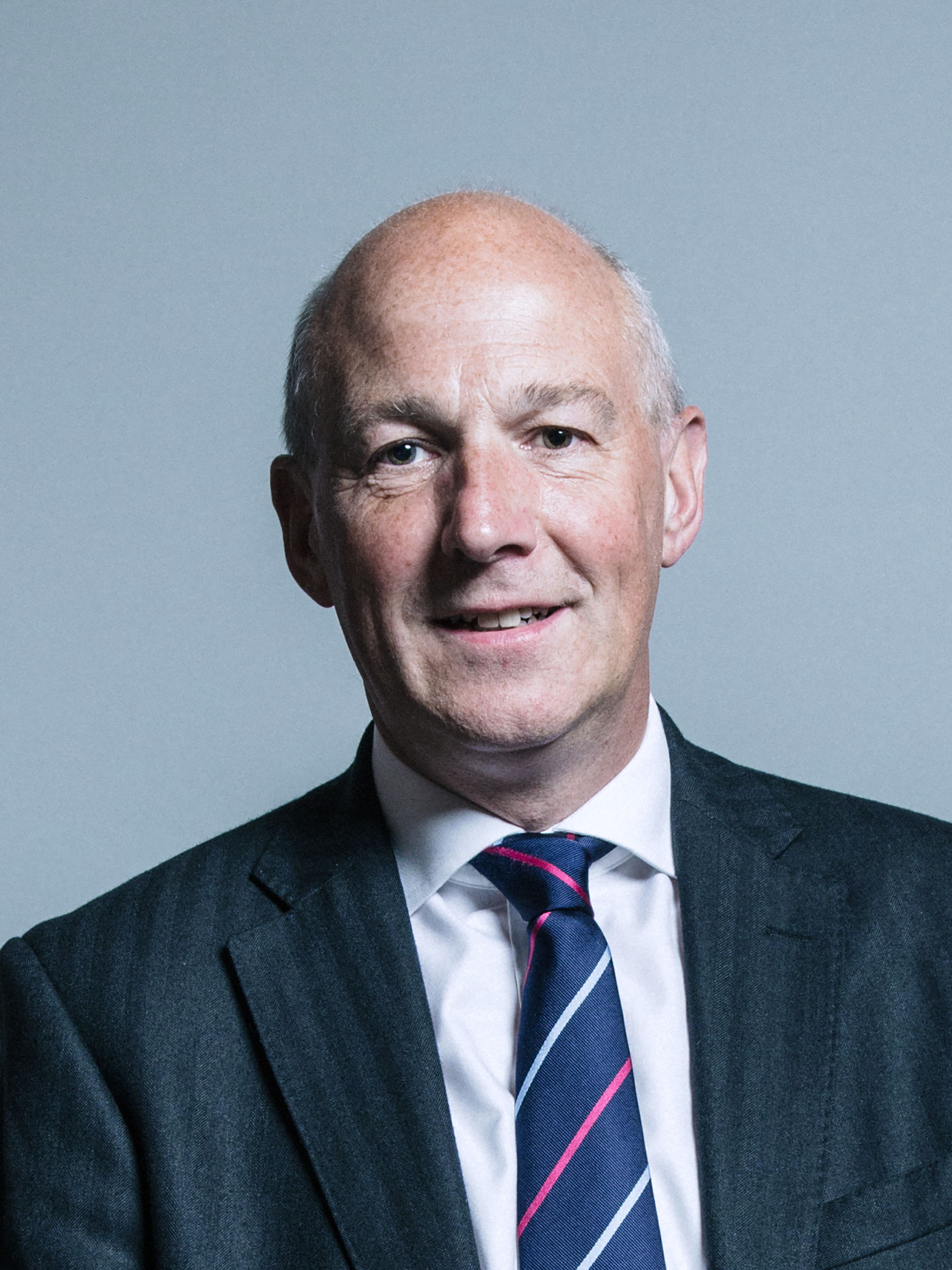

Member of Parliament for Carlisle
- In office 6 May 2010 – 30 May 2024
- Preceded by: Eric Martlew
- Succeeded by: Julie Minns

Personal details
- Born: 4 July 1963 (age 63) Aberdeen, Scotland
- Party: Conservative
- Spouse: Tracy Nixon
- Education: University of Dundee
- Occupation: Politician / Solicitor
- Website: www.johnstevensonmp.co.uk

Andrew John Stevenson (born 4 July 1963) is a British Conservative Party politician and solicitor who was the Member of Parliament (MP) for Carlisle between 2010 and 2024.

== Early life and career ==
Andrew Stevenson was born on 4 July 1963 in Aberdeen. He was state educated at Aberdeen Grammar School and graduated from the University of Dundee with Honours in History and Politics. He then studied law at Chester College before qualifying as a solicitor. He went on to become a partner in the law firm Bendles based in the centre of Carlisle.

== Political career ==
=== Local government career ===
Stevenson stood as the Conservative candidate in the Denton Holme ward of Carlisle City Council in May 1998, before he was elected in another ward just one year later. Stevenson was first elected as a Conservative Councillor on Carlisle City Council in May 1999, for Stanwix Urban – a suburban ward on the northern edge of the city with the joint lowest levels of deprivation in the district. He resigned as a councillor on the 2 August 2010, shortly after his election as Member of Parliament and his party won the subsequent by-election.

=== Parliamentary career ===
Stevenson was elected to Parliament at the 2010 general election as MP for Carlisle with 39.3% of the vote and a majority of 853.

Aside from his duties as a constituency MP, he is the chairman of the All Party Parliamentary Group (APPG) for Food and Drink which advises the direction of national policy on British food and drink manufacture.

In January 2013, Stevenson faced accusations of nepotism for employing his fiancée as a Senior Secretary. Although Stevenson said that no other applicants had been considered for the role, he argued that she was a qualified legal secretary, and still does that work when not working for him. Although MPs who were first elected in 2017 have been banned from employing family members, the restriction is not retrospective – meaning that Stevenson's employment of his wife is lawful.

In January 2014 it was reported that Stevenson was one of a group of MPs who had been charging the taxpayer to help them fill in tax forms. Part of his expenses claim was rejected, although he was not the only MP to be the subject to such action.

At the 2015 general election, Stevenson was re-elected as MP for Carlisle with an increased vote share of 44.3% and an increased majority of 2,774.

In May 2016, it was reported that Stevenson was one of a number of Conservative MPs being investigated by police in the United Kingdom general election, 2015 party spending investigation, for allegedly spending more than the legal limit on constituency election campaign expenses. In May 2017, the Crown Prosecution Service said that while there was evidence of inaccurate spending returns, it did not "meet the test" for further action.

Stevenson was opposed to Brexit prior to the 2016 referendum.

At the snap 2017 general election, Stevenson was again re-elected, with an increased vote share of 49.9% and a decreased majority of 2,599.

Stevenson contributed to the Conservative Government's first defeat over key Brexit legislation in December 2017 when he declined to vote against Dominic Grieve's amendment requiring Parliament to have a vote on the final deal relating to the UK departing the European Union. Following the election of Boris Johnson as Conservative leader, Stevenson later shifted his views on the possibility of a No Deal exit from the EU saying "it may well come to being the only solution".

At the 2019 general election, Stevenson was again re-elected, with an increased vote share of 55.2% and an increased majority of 8,319.

In August 2021, Stevenson and Peter Aldous wrote to Prime Minister Boris Johnson to call on the government to keep the £20-a-week Universal Credit uplift.

Stevenson submitted a letter of no confidence in Boris Johnson following the publication of Sue Gray's report on Partygate in May 2022.

In February 2023, Stevenson was reselected as the Conservative candidate for Carlisle at the 2024 general election; he went on to lose the election to Julie Minns of Labour by 5,200 votes.

=== Attempted Mayor of Cumbria candidacy ===
Stevenson expressed an interest in being the Conservative Party candidate for the inaugural Mayor of Cumbria elections in May 2027. Ultimately, Mike Starkie, former Mayor of Copeland, was selected as the Conservative Party candidate.

== Post-parliamentary career ==
Following his defeat at the 2024 UK General Election, Stevenson has worked as a Managing Partner at Bendles Solicitors. Stevenson also founded, and serves as Chairman, of the think-tank True North, which seeks to "to develop policy ideas to benefit the north east and Cumbria".

== Personal life ==
Stevenson lives in the village of Great Corby, which is close to the edge of Carlisle. He is married to Tracy Nixon and they were wedded at a Church of Scotland ceremony in Carlisle in 2013.

Parliament of the United Kingdom
Preceded by Eric Martlew	Member of Parliament for Carlisle; 2010–2024	Succeeded by Julie Minns
