= Michael Stark =

Michael Stark may refer to:

- Michael Stark, who was among the first to enter a same-sex marriage in Canada, see The Michaels
- Mike Stark, American blogger and activist

== See also ==
- Michael Starke, British actor
- Mike Starkie, British Conservative politician
