= 2011 Copeland Borough Council election =

2011 UK local government election

Map of the results of the 2011 Copeland council election. Labour in red, Conservatives in blue and independent in white.

The 2011 Copeland Borough Council election took place on 5 May 2011 to elect members of Copeland Borough Council in Cumbria, England. The whole council was up for election and the Labour Party stayed in overall control of the council.

== Background ==
At the last election in 2007 Labour won 31 seats, compared to 19 Conservatives and 1 independent. However between 2007 and 2011 Labour councillors Brian Dixon and Sam Meteer quit the party to sit as independents.

A total of 95 candidates stood in the election for the 51 seats being contested. These were 45 Labour, 37 Conservative, 4 independent, 4 British National Party, 3 Green Party and 2 Liberal Democrats. Meanwhile, 12 sitting councillors stood down at the election.

== Election result ==
The results saw Labour hold control of the council after winning 34 of the 51 seats, up 5 on the situation before the election and 3 more than at the 2007 election. The Conservatives dropped 4 seats to have 15 councillors, while 2 independents were elected in Arlecdon and Distington. Overall turnout at the election was 40.98%.

Labour's biggest gains came in Bransty ward in Whitehaven, where they gained all 3 seats from the Conservatives. This included defeating the Conservative parliamentary candidate for Copeland at the 2010 general election, Chris Whiteside. Labour also picked up one seat in Newtown from the Conservatives and defeated the independent, former Labour, councillor Sam Meteer in Egremont North.

Copeland local election result 2011
Party	Seats	Gains	Losses	Net gain/loss	Seats %	Votes %	Votes	+/−
Labour	34	5	0	+5	66.7	56.7	23,697	+3.6%
Conservative	15	0	4	-4	29.4	36.6	15,294	-7.0%
Independent	2	0	1	-1	3.9	3.9	1,649	+2.3%
BNP	0	0	0	0	0	1.3	541	+1.3%
Liberal Democrats	0	0	0	0	0	0.8	342	-0.9%
Green	0	0	0	0	0	0.6	253	+0.6%

== Ward results ==
Arlecdon
Party	Candidate	Votes	%	±%
Independent	Joseph Sunderland	359	80.5	+26.5
Conservative	Marie Simpson	87	19.5	−4.3
Majority		272	61.0	+30.7
Turnout		446	37.3	
Independent hold		Swing		

Beckermet (2)
Party	Candidate	Votes	%	±%
Conservative	Yvonne Clarkson	681		
Conservative	John Jackson	536		
Labour	Jim Hewitson	340		
Turnout		1,557	46.3	
Conservative hold		Swing		
Conservative hold		Swing		

Bootle
Party	Candidate	Votes	%	±%
Conservative	Keith Hitchen	453	83.1	
Labour	Anne Bradshaw	92	16.9	
Majority		361	66.2	
Turnout		545	51.6	
Conservative hold		Swing		

Bransty (3)
Party	Candidate	Votes	%	±%
Labour	Dave Smith	803		
Labour	Gillian Troughton	801		
Labour	Phil Greatorex	710		
Conservative	Brian O'Kane	653		
Conservative	Christopher Whiteside	649		
Conservative	Allan Mossop	642		
Turnout		4,258	40.4	
Labour gain from Conservative		Swing		
Labour gain from Conservative		Swing		
Labour gain from Conservative		Swing		

Cleator Moor North (3)
Party	Candidate	Votes	%	±%
Labour	Joan Hully	723		
Labour	Bill Southward	688		
Labour	Hugh Branney	680		
Conservative	Alexander Carroll	280		
BNP	Daniel Verity	129		
Turnout		2,500	33.0	
Labour hold		Swing		
Labour hold		Swing		
Labour hold		Swing		

Cleator Moor South (2)
Party	Candidate	Votes	%	±%
Labour	David Riley	576		
Labour	Dave Banks	502		
Conservative	David Walker	118		
BNP	Colin Boyton	88		
Turnout		1,284	33.7	
Labour hold		Swing		
Labour hold		Swing		

Distington (3)
Party	Candidate	Votes	%	±%
Labour	John Bowman	614		
Labour	Jackie Bowman	598		
Independent	Brian Dixon	486		
Labour	Simon Leyton	431		
Liberal Democrats	Frank Hollowell	284		
Conservative	Sheena Gray	272		
Turnout		2,685	39.1	
Labour hold		Swing		
Labour hold		Swing		
Independent hold		Swing		

Egremont North (3)
Party	Candidate	Votes	%	±%
Labour	Sam Pollen	714		
Labour	Elaine Woodburn	685		
Labour	Karl Connor	635		
Independent	Sam Meteer	509		
Conservative	John Holmes	371		
Turnout		2,914	40.0	
Labour hold		Swing		
Labour hold		Swing		
Labour gain from Independent		Swing		

Egremont South (3)
Party	Candidate	Votes	%	±%
Labour	Mike McVeigh	803		
Labour	Lena Hogg	694		
Labour	Carole Woodman	676		
Conservative	Elizabeth Hutson	398		
Conservative	Graham Hutson	374		
Independent	Nicola Hewitt	295		
Turnout		3,240	43.3	
Labour hold		Swing		
Labour hold		Swing		
Labour hold		Swing		

Ennerdale
Party	Candidate	Votes	%	±%
Conservative	Bob Salkeld	265	59.3	+1.0
Labour	Cam Ross	96	21.5	+4.4
Liberal Democrats	Mike Minogue	58	13.0	−11.6
Green	Andy Crow	28	6.3	+6.3
Majority		169	37.8	+4.1
Turnout		447	54.3	
Conservative hold		Swing		

Frizington (2)
Party	Candidate	Votes	%	±%
Labour	Peter Connolly	489		
Labour	Jon Downie	355		
Conservative	Hazel Dirom	255		
Turnout		1,099	37.3	
Labour hold		Swing		
Labour hold		Swing		

Gosforth
Party	Candidate	Votes	%	±%
Conservative	Alan Jacob	478	77.5	+6.5
Labour	Bernard Kirk	139	22.5	−6.5
Majority		339	54.9	+12.9
Turnout		61.7	46.7	
Conservative hold		Swing		

Harbour (3)
Party	Candidate	Votes	%	±%
Labour	John Kane	913		
Labour	Henry Wormstrup	746		
Labour	Jeanette Williams	730		
Conservative	Martin Barbour	468		
Conservative	Dorothy Wonnacott	447		
Conservative	Graham Roberts	440		
Turnout		3,744	40.9	
Labour hold		Swing		
Labour hold		Swing		
Labour hold		Swing		

Haverigg
Party	Candidate	Votes	%	±%
Conservative	Doug Wilson	282	55.6	+14.5
Labour	Carl Carter	225	44.4	+17.9
Majority		57	11.2	+2.6
Turnout		507	48.2	
Conservative hold		Swing		

Hensingham (3)
Party	Candidate	Votes	%	±%
Labour	Geoff Garrity	729		
Labour	Norman Williams	653		
Labour	Margarita Docherty	619		
Conservative	Mary Lomas	302		
Turnout		2,303	33.8	
Labour hold		Swing		
Labour hold		Swing		
Labour hold		Swing		

Hillcrest (2)
Party	Candidate	Votes	%	±%
Conservative	Stephen Haraldsen	567		
Conservative	Alistair Norwood	518		
Labour	John Wooley	360		
Turnout		1,445	45.7	
Conservative hold		Swing		
Conservative hold		Swing		

Holborn Hill (2)
Party	Candidate	Votes	%	±%
Conservative	Fred Gleaves	398		
Labour	Jack Park	360		
Conservative	Jane Micklethwaite	308		
Labour	Denise Burness	259		
Green	Neil Wilson	73		
Turnout		1,398	41.9	
Conservative hold		Swing		
Labour hold		Swing		

Kells (2)
Party	Candidate	Votes	%	±%
Labour	George Clements	508		
Labour	Alan Holliday	399		
Conservative	Glenn Gray	199		
Turnout		1,106	37.4	
Labour hold		Swing		
Labour hold		Swing		

Millom Without
Party	Candidate	Votes	%	±%
Conservative	Gilbert Scurrah	386	62.3	
Green	Lynette Gilligan	152	24.5	
Labour	Karon Carter	82	13.2	
Majority		234	37.7	
Turnout		620	52.5	
Conservative hold		Swing		

Mirehouse (3)
Party	Candidate	Votes	%	±%
Labour	Anne Faichney	775		
Labour	Peter Kane	711		
Labour	Paul Whalley	583		
Conservative	Jim King	225		
BNP	George Benson	194		
Turnout		2,488	32.7	
Labour hold		Swing		
Labour hold		Swing		
Labour hold		Swing		

Moresby
Party	Candidate	Votes	%	±%
Labour	Geoff Blackwell	243	55.6	+1.3
Conservative	Brigid Whiteside	194	44.4	−1.3
Majority		49	11.2	+2.5
Turnout		437	40.8	
Labour hold		Swing		

Newtown (3)
Party	Candidate	Votes	%	±%
Labour	John Fallows	725		
Conservative	Francis Heathcote	613		
Conservative	Fee Wilson	480		
Conservative	Brian Crawford	432		
Turnout		2,250	43.0	
Conservative hold		Swing		
Conservative hold		Swing		
Labour gain from Conservative		Swing		

Sandwith (2)
Party	Candidate	Votes	%	±%
Labour	Peter Stephenson	373		
Labour	Peter Tyson	352		
Conservative	Adrian Davis-Johnson	131		
BNP	Malcolm Southward	130		
Conservative	John Dirom	104		
Turnout		1,090	35.7	
Labour hold		Swing		
Labour hold		Swing		

Seascale (2)
Party	Candidate	Votes	%	±%
Conservative	David Moore	935		
Conservative	Eileen Eastwood	878		
Labour	Wendy Skillicorn	292		
Turnout		2,105	54.9	
Conservative hold		Swing		
Conservative hold		Swing		

St Bees
Party	Candidate	Votes	%	±%
Conservative	Ian Hill	475	68.7	−4.7
Labour	Alan Alexander	216	31.3	+4.7
Majority		259	37.5	−9.4
Turnout		691	51.7	
Conservative hold		Swing		
