= Cumberland (unitary authority area) =

District in Cumbria, England

- District and Unitary authority area
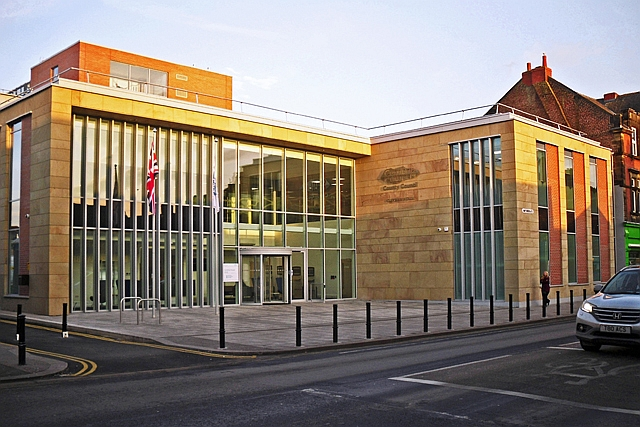
- Cumbria House, Carlisle, the headquarters of Cumberland Council

- Cumberland shown within Cumbria
- Interactive map of Cumberland
- Coordinates: 54°53′41″N 02°56′11″W
- Sovereign state: United Kingdom
- Country: England
- Region: North West
- Ceremonial county: Cumbria
- Historic county: Cumberland (part)
- Incorporated: 1 April 2023
- Named for: Cumberland
- Administrative HQ: Carlisle

Government
  - Type: Unitary authority
  - Body: Cumberland Council
  - Executive: Leader and cabinet
  - Control: Labour
  - Leader: Mark Fryer (L)
  - Chairman: Carni McCarron-Holmes
  - MPs: 4 MPs: Josh MacAlister (L); Michelle Scrogham (L); Markus Campbell-Savours (L); Julie Minns (L)

Area
  - Total: 1,163 sq mi (3,012 km^{2})
  - Rank: 8th

Population (2025)
  - Total: 282,343
  - Rank: 62nd
  - Density: 240/sq mi (94/km^{2})
- Time zone: UTC+0 (GMT)
  - Summer (DST): UTC+1 (BST)
- Postcode areas: CA
- GSS code: E06000063
- Website: cumberland.gov.uk

Cumberland is a district and unitary authority area in the ceremonial county of Cumbria, England. It covers the north-western part of Cumbria, including the west of the Lake District. The city of Carlisle is the largest settlement and the administrative centre. The unitary authority area covers the majority of the area of the historic county of Cumberland, from which it takes its name, but does not include the area around Penrith.

The unitary authority area was formed on 1 April 2023 during a local government restructuring which abolished the non-metropolitan county of Cumbria and its six districts. Cumberland has the same area as the former districts of Carlisle, Allerdale, and Copeland, being constituted as a non-metropolitan county and coterminous non-metropolitan district with the same area as the former districts. The three remaining districts of Cumbria were merged into Westmorland and Furness. It remains part of Cumbria for ceremonial purposes. Prior to the local government reforms of 1974, which created Cumbria, Carlisle was a county borough and the remainder of the area was within the administrative county of Cumberland.

The local authority for the area is Cumberland Council, which provides the services of both a county council and a district council. The first elections to the new authority took place in May 2022, with Cumberland Council acting as a "shadow authority" until the abolition of Cumbria County Council and the three district councils on 1 April 2023.

== History ==
Elections to Cumbria County Council were due to take place in May 2021 but were postponed by the Secretary of State for Housing, Communities and Local Government for one year due to a consultation on local government reorganisation in the area. In July 2021, the government announced that the current authorities in Cumbria would be abolished and replaced with two unitary authorities in the form of an 'east/west split' of the county.

Opponents of the reorganisation claimed that the proposal was pursued to benefit the electoral prospects of the Conservative Party. Cumbria County Council, which would be abolished under the plans, sought judicial review to prevent the reorganisation from taking place. The judicial review was refused by the High Court in January 2022. Draft statutory instruments to bring about local government reorganisation in Cumbria were subsequently laid before parliament. The Cumbria (Structural Changes) Order 2022 (2022 No. 331) was made on 17 March 2022 and came into force the following day.

== Governance ==
Cumberland was established by The Cumbria (Structural Changes) Order 2022. It is both a non-metropolitan county and a non-metropolitan district.

The first elections to Cumberland Council took place in May 2022, with the council acting as a 'shadow authority' until the abolition of the three former district councils and Cumbria County Council on 1 April 2023. Labour won a majority with 30 seats. The Conservatives have 7 seats, Liberal Democrats 4 seats, independents 3 seats and the Green Party 2 seats. Turnout was 36.1%.

Cumberland and the neighbouring Westmorland and Furness continue to form the ceremonial county of Cumbria for the purposes of lieutenancy and shrievalties, being presided over by a Lord Lieutenant of Cumbria and a High Sheriff of Cumbria.

Police services are provided by Cumbria Constabulary and fire services by Cumbria Fire and Rescue Service. These are both overseen by the Cumbria Police, Fire and Crime Commissioner.

High Sheriffs pay attention to the work of such statutory bodies as the Police, the Prison Service and the Probation Service.

=== Twinnings ===
Settlement	Twinned settlement
Carlisle	Flensburg, Germany; Słupsk, Poland
Cockermouth	Marvejols, France
Whitehaven	Kozloduy, Bulgaria
Workington	Selm, Germany; Val-de-Reuil, France

== Geography ==
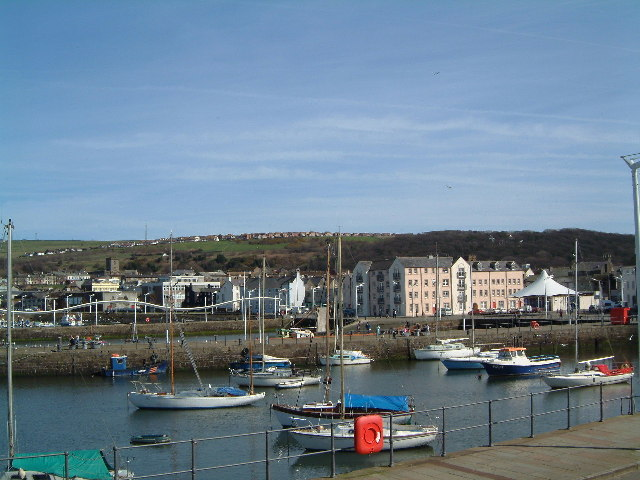
A coastal scene in Whitehaven

Major settlements;

- Arlecdon and Frizington
- Aspatria
- Brampton
- Carlisle
- Cleator Moor
- Cockermouth
- Dalston
- Egremont
- Harrington
- Keswick
- Longtown
- Maryport
- Millom
- Silloth
- St Bees
- Whitehaven
- Wigton
- Workington

Neighbouring council areas
District	In relation to the district
Dumfries and Galloway	North
Scottish Borders	North east
Northumberland	East
Westmorland and Furness	South

== Economy ==
- Associated British Ports own and operate the port of Silloth.
- Plastic film maker Innovia Films has its headquarters and only UK factory in Wigton, which employs almost 1,000 people and is Wigton's biggest employer.
- Sealy Beds UK (which is part of the Silentnight Group) own a factory at Aspatria, which employs around 300 people.
- Carr's is a successful foodstuff and agricultural brand that was established in 1831 in Carlisle. It owned a large factory at Silloth which makes the 'Carr's Breadmaker' range and at one time Carr's farm feeds. This has been sold to Whitworths.
- Window maker West Port Windows owns a large factory at Maryport, which makes UPVC windows and doors.
- World rally company M-Sport has its headquarters at Dovenby Hall, Dovenby, near Cockermouth.
- Swedish paper maker Iggesund Paperboard has its only UK factory at Siddick, near Workington.
- U.S.-based Eastman Chemical Company had a factory at Siddick, near Workington. It made plastic bottle pellets and products for the smoking industry and employed 100 people. This has been subsequently demolished and production transferred overseas.
- Steel company Tata Steel owns a cast products plant at Workington, which employs 300 people.
- Eddie Stobart Logistics owns a large warehouse at Workington, which was once owned by truck and bus maker Leyland.
- Packaging company Amcor owns the former Alcan packaging plant at Salterbeck, Workington.
- James Walker Ltd, an international high-performance sealing manufacturer, has a large factory at Cockermouth.
- Close to 1,000 people work in one of only two Pirelli tyre plants in the UK.
- Stobart Group's rail maintenance business is based in Carlisle.
- Eddie Stobart, which is one of the UK's largest logistics companies, used to be headquartered in Carlisle.
- Nestlé operates a factory on the outskirts of Carlisle.
- Cavaghan & Gray (owned by the by 2 Sisters Food Group) is a food manufacturing business based in Carlisle and a significant employer in the city.
- Crown Holdings owns two factories in Carlisle, locally known as 'Metal Box'. Both factories make products for the beverage industry.
- Edinburgh Woollen Mill announced plans to move their HQ from Langholm, Scottish Borders to Carlisle.
- Sellafield is the largest employer in the unitary authority area; many people from Cumberland have links to the site.

== Media ==
Local television services for the area is provided by BBC Look North and ITV News Lookaround.

Radio stations for the area are BBC Radio Cumbria, Greatest Hits Radio Cumbria & South West Scotland, and Heart North West.

The local newspapers are: The Cumberland News, News and Star, and North West Evening Mail.

== See also ==
- 2019–2023 structural changes to local government in England
