= Carlisle Turkish baths =

Public baths in Carlisle, England

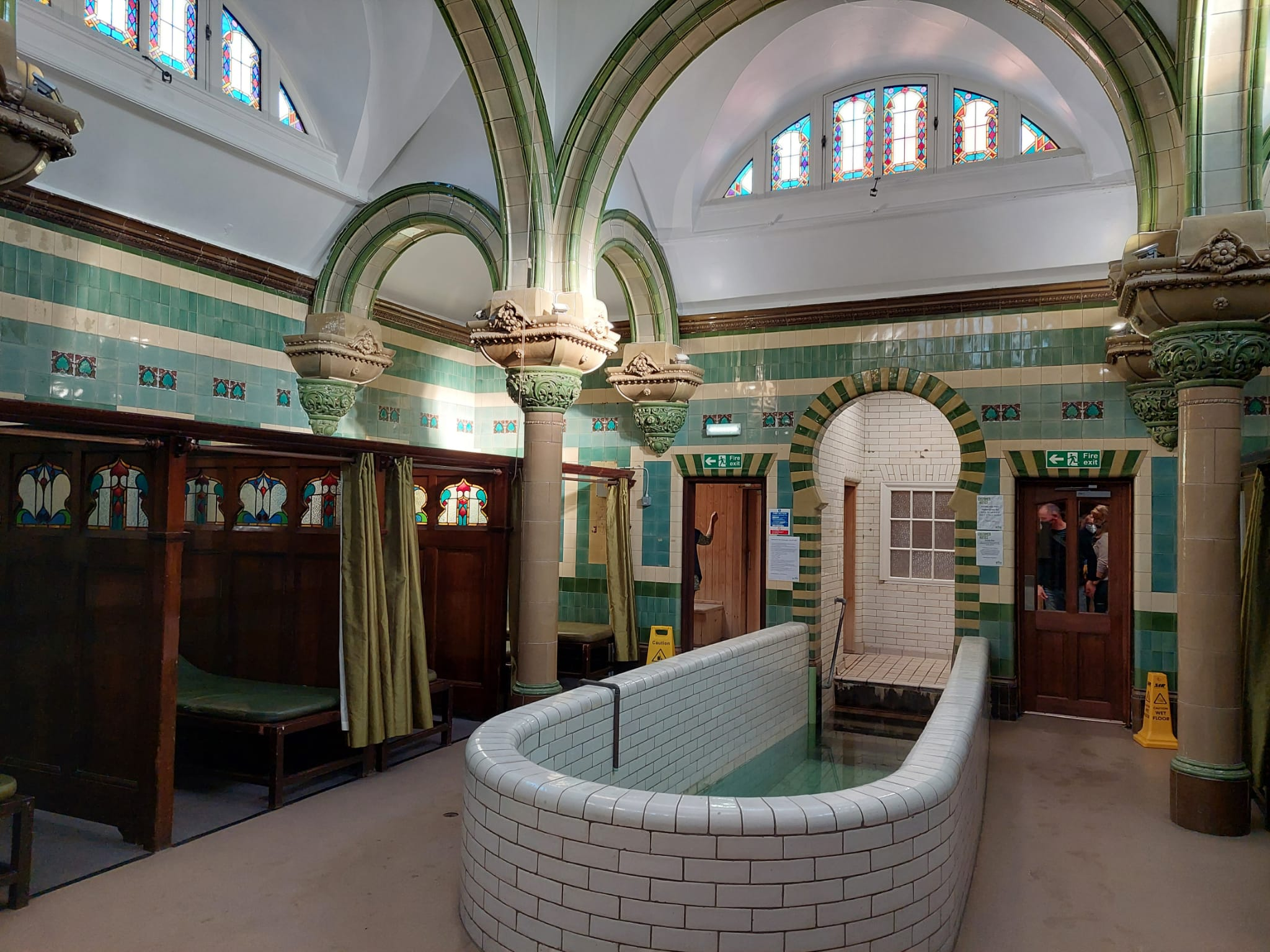
- Interior of Carlisle Turkish Baths: plunge pool and changing rooms
- Interactive map of the Carlisle Turkish baths area

General information
- Type: Baths and wash houses in Britain; Victorian-style Turkish baths
- Location: Carlisle, Cumbria, James Street, England
- Coordinates: 54.8899°N 2.9349°W
- Opened: 1909
- Closed: 2022
- Cost: £2,500

Design and construction
- Architects: Henry C Marks, Percy Dalton
- Main contractor: William Johnstone
- Designations: Grade II Listed

Other information
- Facilities: hot rooms, massage slabs, plunge pool, steam room, launderette

Website
- carlislebaths.co.uk

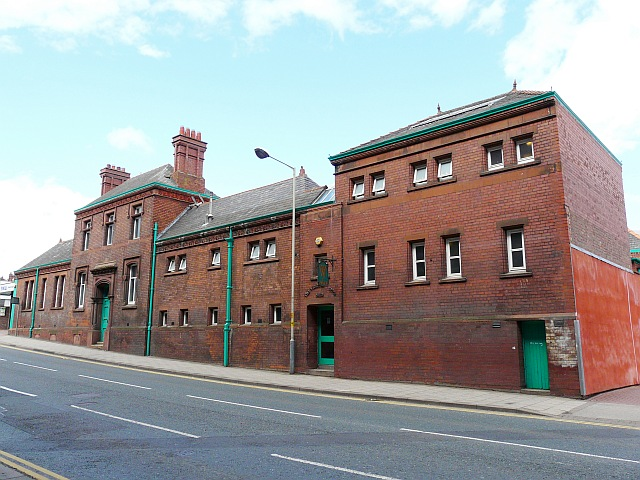
Façade of the Turkish Baths with the Victorian swimming pool to the left

The Carlisle Turkish baths were an Edwardian public baths in Carlisle, Cumbria, England. They adjoined the city's 1884 swimming pool and were constructed in 1908–1909. The baths offered saunas, plunge pools and showers, and were advertised as providing health benefits to patrons. These typical Victorian-style Turkish baths remained in use until November 2022 and retain their original tiling and faience work, which is of unusually good quality. A local campaign, The Friends of Carlisle Victorian and Turkish Baths, is seeking to reopen the baths.

== Description ==
The building's red-brick western façade faces onto James Street; it was the only external wall visible from outside until the demolition of adjacent buildings on the southern side. The western portion of the building includes the main entrance leading to an attendant's room and waiting rooms. This single-storey structure was enclosed by a 2-storey structure at a later date, leaving a relatively plain façade and entrance. The entrance block retains the original glazed doors and the attendant's room features a corner fireplace.

A corridor from the entrance block leads into a double-height structure housing a cooling room and a single-storey structure containing a plunge bath, shower room and Russian vapour bath. The cooling room is the centrepiece of the complex and retains the original concrete plunge bath and steps, lined in white-glazed bricks. Five changing rooms along the walls have green and yellow tiled surrounds. A stained-glass ceiling is lit from above by a lantern atop a pyramidal roof.

A single-storey structure adjacent to the cooling room houses a further plunge bath, shower room and Russian vapour bath. A two-storey block beyond the cooling room houses a shampooing room and beyond that are three warm rooms (saunas).

The roofs are in slate. The interior is oriental themed, with Moorish-style arches, and includes art nouveau motifs such as paired tiles. The interior has a terrazzo floor and marble benches. The faience and tiling throughout makes use of pale green, pale blue and buff glazes and has been described as being of "good quality and complete".

== History ==
Planning for Turkish baths in Carlisle began in 1884 when the swimming pool was opened at James Street by the County Borough of Carlisle. The borough revived the plans in 1901 and agreed to proceed with construction of the baths, adjacent to the swimming pool, in 1902. Designs, by the county surveyor Henry C Marks, were not approved until 1908. Construction was carried out by William Johnstone of Carlisle at a total cost of £2,500; the tiling and faience work was by Minton and Hollins of Stoke-on-Trent.

The baths opened to the public on 20 September 1909. They were advertised for the "alleviation of rheumatism and kindred ailments, general tonic effect, obesity and alleviation of stress". Bathers initially paid between 1 and 2 shillings for a session of around 1.5 hours. In 1957 more than 100,000 people used the baths and adjacent swimming pool. In the 1960s the baths also offered massages and tea and toast was served to the changing rooms.

The baths were granted statutory protection by Historic England on 19 February 2010 as a grade II listed building. The organisation described them as "an increasingly rare example of a once common building form, of which only around 20 remain in England; it compares very favourably with the eight existing listed Turkish Baths". An October 2022 report in The Guardian describes them as "one of the most affordable Turkish baths in the UK, with entry costing £7.10". In late 2022 the baths won the "best small tourist attraction" prize at the Cumbria Life Awards. By this time the running of the baths had been outsourced to Better Leisure. Between September and October 2022 the mirrors in the baths' cubicles went missing and their theft was reported to Cumbria Police.

== Closure ==
In late 2022 Carlisle City Council determined that the baths were too expensive to run, citing running costs of around £26,500 a month. The adjacent swimming pool complex had already been sold for development, which increased the costs of running the baths as a standalone attraction. The baths closed on 12 November 2022. The closure left only eleven operational Turkish baths in the UK, out of around 700 originally built, and only eight remaining open to the public.

A campaign group, the Friends of Carlisle Victorian and Turkish Baths, was formed to campaign for the reopening of the baths, which were the last Turkish baths in North West England. The campaigners hope to turn the site into a health and wellbeing centre, with one of the pools converted into a hydrotherapy facility, and treatment rooms and an ice grotto installed. The campaign hopes that local government changes, which will see the city come under Cumberland Council from April 2023, may lead to a reconsideration of the closure. The chair of the campaign to save the baths, Julie Minns, was elected as the Labour Party Member of Parliament for the city's constituency in the 2024 United Kingdom general election.

== Timeline ==
Year	Event
1883	Carlisle baths sub committee visit the Liverpool Public Baths and agree to build a laundry, plunge pools, showers, slipper and vapour baths to promote health and hygiene of the people of Carlisle.
1884	Carlisle's Public Baths open. An area adjacent to the new baths is set aside for ‘Turkish Baths’.
1900	Carlisle's City Engineer directed to prepare plans for ‘Turkish Baths’ on the site purchased for that purpose.
1908	After several delays, a contract to build the Turkish Baths is signed with local builder William Johnstone. Apart from tiling by Minton and Hollins of Stoke-on-Trent, and heating and ventilation work by Constantine's of Manchester, all the working done by local craftsmen.
1909	The Turkish Baths open!
1922	Carlisle United players are given a 10% discount to use the Baths.
1937	One of several attempts to close the Baths is abandoned after Carlisle doctors support it remaining open.
Late 1950s	Turkish Baths close.
1959	Turkish Baths reopen.
1991	A threatened closure is averted after a group of longstanding users organise a petition.
2010	Carlisle MP, Eric Martlew, successfully applies for the Baths to be listed.
2021 January	Carlisle Council commissions a Feasibility Study to “consider a series of alternative functions" for the Baths.
2021 May	The Friends of Carlisle Victorian and Turkish Baths is formed.
2022 April	The Friends become a registered charity. The Architectural Heritage Fund award the Friends a grant for a viability study.
2022	Carlisle City Council votes to close the Turkish Baths.

== See also ==
- Victorian Turkish baths
