= Kendal Town Hall =

Municipal building in Kendal, Cumbria, England

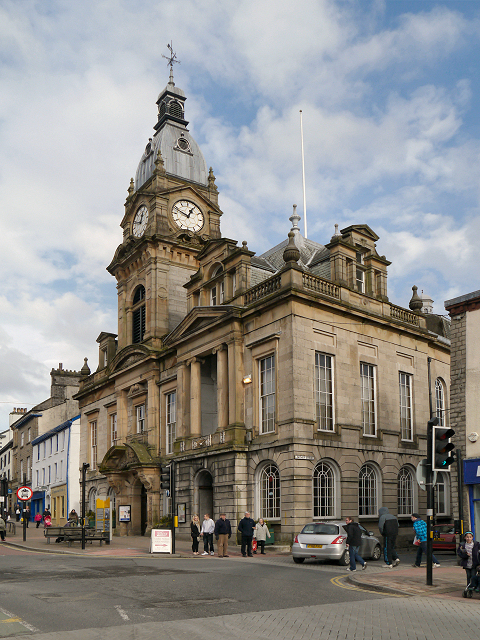

- Location within Cumbria
- 54.3269°N 2.7471°W
- Location: Kendal, Cumbria

History
- Built: 1827

Site notes
- Architect: Francis Webster

Listed Building – Grade II
- Designated: 24 April 1951
- Reference no.: 1318980

The Town Hall is a municipal building in Highgate, Kendal, Cumbria. It is a Grade II listed building. It serves as the headquarters of Kendal Town Council and also forms part of the complex of buildings which serves as the headquarters of Westmorland and Furness Council.

== History ==
The first town hall, known as the "moot hall", was built at the corner of the Market Place and Stricklandgate in 1591. It was a plain white building embellished over the centuries with a Venetian window, a turret clock, a bell cote and a flagpole. (Note: After the civic authorities moved out, the moot hall served as a drapers store until 1969, when it was destroyed in a fire; it was rebuilt in the same style, with the Venetian window surviving, and has since had a variety of retail uses.)

In 1859, after the moot hall was deemed inadequate, the civic authorities acquired the current building at the corner of Highgate and Lowther Street. At the time the building was known as the "White Hall". It had been designed by Francis Webster and completed in 1827. It was so called because the site had previously been occupied by an earlier White Hall, where cloth was bought and sold, some of it for export to Virginia and other parts of the United States. The building was designed with a large Ionic order loggia on the first floor with a pediment above on its western i.e. front elevation.

The building was converted for use as a town hall by George Webster, the original architect's son, after which it was used as the local facility for dispensing justice as well as a meeting place for the municipal borough of Kendal. The conversion involved the construction of a courtroom to the rear of the building and police cells in the basement in 1859. A large clock tower, financed by a donation from John Wakefield of Sedgwick House, was added in 1861, containing a clock and carillon (manufactured by Smith & Sons of Derby); the carillon plays seven different tunes (one for each day of the week) on ten bells (the largest of which weighs 46 cwt (2.3 tonnes)).

After the Local Government Act 1888, which established county councils in every county, the building also became the meeting place for Westmorland County Council. The building was extended to the north, to the designs of Stephen Shaw and financed by a donation from Alderman William Bindloss, in 1893.

The County Council moved out to their own facilities at County Hall in Stricklandgate in 1939. The town hall ceased to be the local seat of government when the South Lakeland District Council was formed in 1974. From 1974 to 1991, South Lakeland District Council was based at Stricklandgate House, the former offices of South Westmorland Rural District Council. In 1991 the council moved to a new building called South Lakeland House, immediately behind Kendal Town Hall, on a site formerly occupied by a police station. The main public entrance to South Lakeland House was down an alleyway beside the town hall.

In February 2019 South Lakeland District Council announced works costing £4.9 million to convert the town hall into a reception centre for both the Town Council and the District Council, using part of the ground floor as a reception area for the offices in South Lakeland House behind the town hall, and bringing council meetings back into the town hall itself. Space was also provided to be a hub for small businesses. The refurbished building reopened in May 2021.

Further local government reform in 2023 saw South Lakeland District Council replaced by the new unitary authority of Westmorland and Furness Council. The new council chose to use Kendal Town Hall and the adjoining South Lakeland House as its official headquarters. Full council meetings were initially held at County Hall in Kendal, but in 2024 the council decided to close that building and move meetings to Kendal Town Hall.

Works of art held in the town hall include Queen Catherine Parr's prayer book, (Note: Catherine Parr was the daughter of Sir Thomas Parr, the local lord of the manor.) a ceremonial sword presented to the town by King Charles I and a painting by George Romney depicting "King Lear in the Tempest Tearing off his Robes". Outside the building is a lump of stone known as the "Calling Stone", formerly part of Stricklandgate Market Cross, at which the accessions of new monarchs have historically been announced to the local people.
