= 1999 Copeland Borough Council election =

1999 UK local government election

The 1999 Copeland Borough Council election took place on 6 May 1999 to elect members of Copeland Borough Council in Cumbria, England. The whole council was up for election with boundary changes since the last election in 1995. The Labour Party stayed in overall control of the council.

== Election result ==
Copeland local election result 1999
| Party | Seats | Gains | Losses | Net gain/loss | Seats % | Votes % | Votes | +/− |
|---|---|---|---|---|---|---|---|---|
| Labour | 30 | | | -2 | 58.8 | | | |
| Conservative | 18 | | | +4 | 35.3 | | | |
| Independent | 2 | | | 0 | 3.9 | | | |
| Liberal Democrats | 1 | | | +1 | 2.0 | | | |
| Others | 0 | | | -2 | 0.0 | | | |
