= 2003 Copeland Borough Council election =

2003 UK local government election

Map of the results of the 2003 Copeland council election. Labour in red, Conservatives in blue, independent in white and Liberal Democrats in yellow.

The 2003 Copeland Borough Council election took place on 1 May 2003 to elect members of Copeland Borough Council in Cumbria, England. The whole council was up for election and the Labour Party stayed in overall control of the council.

== Election result ==
Copeland local election result 2003
Party	Seats	Gains	Losses	Net gain/loss	Seats %	Votes %	Votes	+/−
Labour	31			+1	60.8	57.7	30,433	
Conservative	16			-1	31.4	35.0	18,438	
Independent	3			0	5.9	3.7	1,962	
Liberal Democrats	1			0	2.0	3.6	1,906	

3 Conservative candidates were unopposed.

== Ward results ==
Arlecdon
Party	Candidate	Votes	%	±%
Independent	Joseph Sunderland	463	71.0	
Labour	Simon Leyton	189	29.0	
Majority		274	42.0	
Turnout		652		

Beckermet (2)
Party	Candidate	Votes	%	±%
Conservative	Yvonne Clarkson	unopposed		
Conservative	John Jackson	unopposed		

Bootle
Party	Candidate	Votes	%	±%
Conservative	Keith Hitchen	502	68.6	
Liberal Democrats	Roger Putnam	230	31.4	
Majority		272	37.2	
Turnout		732		

Bransty (3)
Party	Candidate	Votes	%	±%
Conservative	Dorothy Wonnacott	924		
Labour	James Hewitson	839		
Labour	Anthony Johnston	829		
Conservative	Mark Mallard	812		
Labour	Edward Brenan	798		
Conservative	Allan Mossop	752		
Turnout		4,954		

Cleator Moor North (3)
Party	Candidate	Votes	%	±%
Independent	Anthony Wells	616		
Labour	Joan Hully	538		
Labour	William Southward	511		
Labour	John Henney	445		
Turnout		2,110		

Cleator Moor South (2)
Party	Candidate	Votes	%	±%
Labour	Catherine Giel	679		
Labour	David Banks	652		
Conservative	Hilda Morris	194		
Liberal Democrats	Mike Minogue	192		
Liberal Democrats	Stuart Bowers	180		
Turnout		1,897		

Distington (3)
Party	Candidate	Votes	%	±%
Labour	Willis Metherell	992		
Labour	Brian Dixon	963		
Labour	Kevin Young	952		
Liberal Democrats	Frank Hollowell	441		
Liberal Democrats	Mary Lancaster	349		
Conservative	Joyce Toft	231		
Liberal Democrats	Stephen Litt	197		
Turnout		4,125		

Egremont North (3)
Party	Candidate	Votes	%	±%
Labour	Samuel Meteer	975		
Labour	Elaine Woodburn	936		
Labour	Margaret Woodburn	933		
Conservative	Steven Hill	536		
Conservative	Alfred Bailey	402		
Conservative	Elizabeth Hutson	402		
Turnout		4,184		

Egremont South (3)
Party	Candidate	Votes	%	±%
Labour	Michael McVeigh	1,184		
Labour	Peter Watson	1,043		
Labour	Constance Watson	1,005		
Conservative	John Holmes	592		
Conservative	Jean Lewthwaite	572		
Conservative	Frederick Blinco	537		
Turnout		4,933		

Ennerdale
Party	Candidate	Votes	%	±%
Conservative	Robert Salkeld	327	68.7	
Labour	Mary Ross	149	31.3	
Majority		178	37.4	
Turnout		476		

Frizington (2)
Party	Candidate	Votes	%	±%
Labour	Peter Connolly	616		
Independent	James Close	592		
Labour	Timothy Knowles	425		
Turnout		1,633		

Gosforth
Party	Candidate	Votes	%	±%
Conservative	David Gray	563	71.9	
Labour	Christina Cornall	220	28.1	
Majority		343	43.8	
Turnout		783		

Harbour (3)
Party	Candidate	Votes	%	±%
Labour	Janet Johnston	987		
Labour	Henry Wormstrup	944		
Labour	Paul Whalley	901		
Conservative	Marcus Swift	589		
Conservative	David Hall	572		
Turnout		3,993		

Haverigg
Party	Candidate	Votes	%	±%
Liberal Democrats	Margaret Barnes	317	50.6	
Conservative	Francis Cairns	309	49.4	
Majority		8	1.3	
Turnout		626		

Hensingham (3)
Party	Candidate	Votes	%	±%
Labour	Norman Williams	1,104		
Labour	Jamieson Reed	970		
Labour	Margarita Docherty	859		
Conservative	Gareth Maley	436		
Turnout		3,369		

Hillcrest (2)
Party	Candidate	Votes	%	±%
Conservative	Alistair Norwood	828		
Conservative	Andrew Wonnacott	728		
Labour	John Woolley	415		
Turnout		1,971		

Holborn Hill (2)
Party	Candidate	Votes	%	±%
Labour	John Park	683	38.9	
Conservative	Frederick Gleaves	665	37.9	
Conservative	Alan Altree	407	23.2	
Turnout		1,755		

Kells (2)
Party	Candidate	Votes	%	±%
Labour	George Clements	791		
Labour	Alan Holliday	661		
Conservative	Leah Higgins	262		
Turnout		1,714		

Millom Without
Party	Candidate	Votes	%	±%
Conservative	Gilbert Scurrah	unopposed		

Mirehouse (3)
Party	Candidate	Votes	%	±%
Labour	Dorothy Faichney	1,320		
Labour	Robert Docherty	1,132		
Labour	Michael Ashbrook	875		
Conservative	George Higgins	305		
Conservative	Dorothy Gray	204		
Turnout		3,836		

Moresby
Party	Candidate	Votes	%	±%
Labour	Geoffrey Blackwell	343	54.9	
Conservative	Edward Fox	282	45.1	
Majority		61	9.8	
Turnout		625		

Newtown (3)
Party	Candidate	Votes	%	±%
Conservative	Francis McPhillips	905		
Conservative	Francis Heathcote	898		
Conservative	Raymond Cole	872		
Labour	Gavin Towers	591		
Labour	Keith Crellin	502		
Turnout		3,768		

St Bees
Party	Candidate	Votes	%	±%
Conservative	Norman Clarkson	575	74.6	
Labour	Archibald Ross	196	25.4	
Majority		379	49.2	
Turnout		771		

Sandwith (2)
Party	Candidate	Votes	%	±%
Labour	Peter Tyson	536		
Labour	James Prince	360		
Independent	Gordon Brown	291		
Conservative	Sheena Gray	146		
Turnout		1,333		

Seascale (2)
Party	Candidate	Votes	%	±%
Conservative	David Moore	1,147		
Conservative	Eileen Eastwood	962		
Labour	Charles Tuley	390		
Turnout		2,499		
