= County Hall, Kendal =

County building in Kendal, Cumbria, England

County Hall
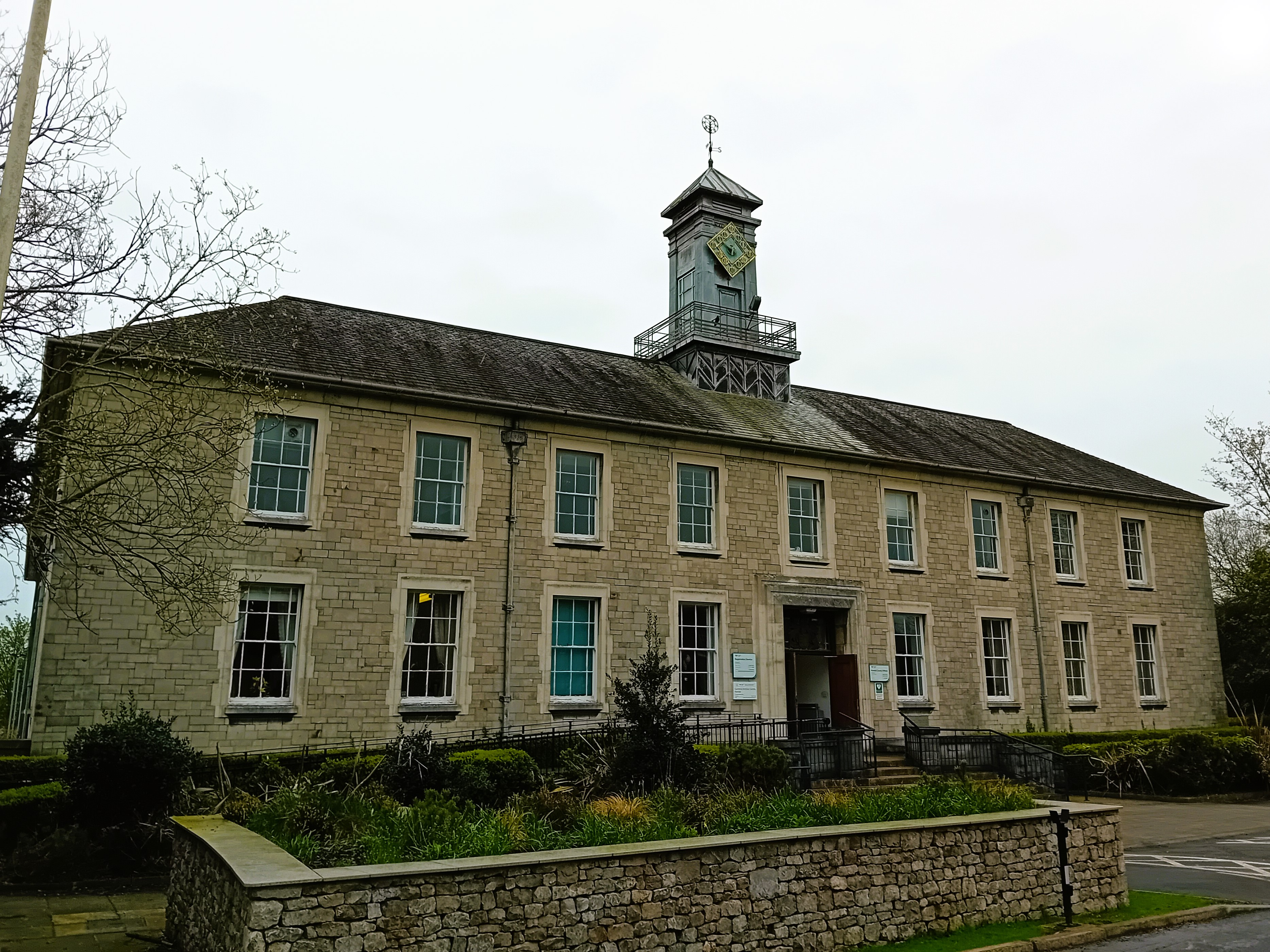

- Location in historic Westmorland Location in Cumbria
- 54.3317°N 2.7476°W
- Location: Kendal

History
- Built: 1939

Site notes
- Architect: Verner Owen Rees
- Architectural style: Neo-Georgian style

Listed Building – Grade II
- Designated: 27 February 2013
- Reference no.: 1410338

The County Hall, also known as County Offices, is a building in Stricklandgate, Kendal, England. The structure, which was the headquarters of Westmorland County Council from 1939 to 1974, is a Grade II listed building.

== History ==
In the early 20th century the town hall in Kendal was the meeting place of Westmorland County Council. After finding that the town hall was too cramped to accommodate both the town council and the county council, council leaders decided to procure a dedicated county headquarters: the site they chose was open land on the corner of Stricklandgate and Busher Walk.

The new building, which was designed by Verner Owen Rees in the Neo-Georgian style and built by local builders, G. F. Martindale, was opened as "Westmorland County Hall" in 1939. The design involved a symmetrical main frontage with nine bays facing onto Stricklandgate; the central bay featured a doorway on the ground floor with a rectangular fanlight containing the county coat of arms; there was a sash window on the first floor and a central turret with a square clock at roof level. Internally, the principal room was the council chamber. A brass plaque commemorating council staff who had died in the Second World War was erected in the vestibule of the building after the war.

After leaving the Royal train at Arnside railway station, Queen Elizabeth II, accompanied by the Duke of Edinburgh, visited Westmorland County Hall in August 1956. An emergency control centre, which was intended to accommodate staff in the event of a nuclear attack, was installed in the basement of the building in the 1960s.

Following the implementation of the Local Government Act 1972, Westmorland County Council and Cumberland County Council amalgamated to form a single county council known as Cumbria County Council in 1974. The building was renamed "Kendal County Offices" and continued to serve as the local register office and also as the Kendal and Whitehaven Archive Centre. Although the administrative offices of Cumbria County Council were at Cumbria House in Botchergate in Carlisle, formal meetings of the Council continued to be held at the County Offices in Kendal. A programme of major refurbishment works in the archive centre involving the creation of two new strong rooms was completed in spring 2019. In October 2019, the environmental movement, Extinction Rebellion, held a demonstration outside the building.

Cumbria County Council was abolished on 1 April 2023, with the southern and eastern areas becoming part of the new unitary authority of Westmorland and Furness. The new Westmorland and Furness Council initially met at the County Hall. In June 2024 the council decided to close the building in September 2024 and move meetings, staff and services to Kendal Town Hall and South Lakeland House. In April 2026, the future of the building was decided in a vote by the council. Councillors voted to dispose of the building, meaning it will either be passed onto a community organisation or sold on the market.
