= 2019 Copeland Borough Council election =

2019 UK local government election

Map of the results

The 2019 Copeland Borough Council election took place on 2 May 2019 to elect members of the Copeland Borough Council in England. They were held on the same day as other local elections.

== Result Summary ==
2019 Copeland Borough Council election
| Party | Seats | Gains | Losses | Net gain/loss | Seats % | Votes % | Votes | +/− |
|---|---|---|---|---|---|---|---|---|
| Labour | 19 | – | – | ▼10 | 57.6 | 49.1 | 14,168 | |
| Conservative | 10 | – | – | ▼7 | 30.3 | 39.8 | 11,473 | |
| Independent | 4 | – | – | ▼1 | 12.1 | 9.9 | 2,853 | |
| UKIP | 0 | – | – | Steady | 0.0 | 1.1 | 316 | |
| Liberal Democrats | 0 | – | – | Steady | 0.0 | 0.1 | 34 | |

== Ward results ==
=== Arlecdon & Ennerdale ===
Arlecdon & Ennerdale
| Party | Candidate | Votes | % |
|---|---|---|---|
| Labour | Gwynneth Everett | 503 | 42.7 |
| Independent | Steven Morgan | 477 | 40.5 |
| Labour | Duncan Hoyle | 351 | 29.8 |
| Conservative | Arthur Lamb | 290 | 24.6 |
| Conservative | Allan Mossop | 267 | 22.7 |
| Majority | | 126 | 10.7 |
| Turnout | | 1,178 | 33.0 |
| Labour win (new seat) | | | |
| Independent win (new seat) | | | |

=== Beckermet ===
Beckermet
| Party | Candidate | Votes | % | ±% |
|---|---|---|---|---|
| Independent | Sam Meteer | 339 | 56.2 | |
| Conservative | Yvonne Clarkson | 264 | 43.8 | |
| Majority | | 75 | 12.4 | |
| Turnout | | 613 | 37.0 | |
| Independent hold | | Swing | | |

=== Black Combe & Scafell ===
Black Combe & Scafell
| Party | Candidate | Votes | % |
|---|---|---|---|
| Conservative | Gerard McGrath | 677 | 49.9 |
| Conservative | Doug Wilson | 622 | 45.9 |
| Labour | Anne Todd | 483 | 35.6 |
| Majority | | 139 | 10.3 |
| Turnout | | 1,356 | 41.0 |
| Conservative win (new seat) | | | |
| Conservative win (new seat) | | | |

=== Cleator Moor ===
Cleator Moor
| Party | Candidate | Votes | % |
|---|---|---|---|
| Labour | Joan Hully | 723 | 50.9 |
| Labour | Hugh Branney | 719 | 50.6 |
| Labour | Linda Jones-Bulman | 660 | 46.5 |
| Independent | Nicholas Ford | 329 | 23.2 |
| UKIP | Lee Doran | 316 | 22.3 |
| Conservative | Oliver Dorgan | 266 | 18.7 |
| Conservative | Chris Whiteside | 233 | 16.4 |
| Independent | Herbert Crossman | 208 | 14.6 |
| Conservative | Calum Nicholson | 135 | 9.5 |
| Majority | | 331 | 23.3 |
| Registered electors | | 5,117 | |
| Turnout | | 1,420 | 28.0 |
| Rejected ballots | | 9 | 0.6 |
| Labour win (new seat) | | | |
| Labour win (new seat) | | | |
| Labour win (new seat) | | | |

=== Corkickle ===
Corkickle
| Party | Candidate | Votes | % |
|---|---|---|---|
| Labour | Gemma Dinsdale | 328 | 60.3 |
| Conservative | Andrew Wonnacott | 216 | 39.7 |
| Majority | | 112 | 20.6 |
| Registered electors | | 1,559 | |
| Turnout | | 557 | 36.0 |
| Rejected ballots | | 13 | 2.3 |
| Labour win (new seat) | | | |

=== Distington, Lowca & Parton ===
Distington, Lowca & Parton
| Party | Candidate | Votes | % |
|---|---|---|---|
| Labour | Jackie Bowman | 481 | 55.2 |
| Labour | Dave Banks | 349 | 40.0 |
| Conservative | Daniel Glover | 283 | 32.5 |
| Conservative | Elaine Haraldsen | 272 | 31.2 |
| Majority | | 66 | 7.6 |
| Turnout | | 872 | 29.0 |
| Labour win (new seat) | | | |
| Labour win (new seat) | | | |

=== Egremont ===
Egremont
| Party | Candidate | Votes | % |
|---|---|---|---|
| Labour | Michael McVeigh | 1,009 | 61.8 |
| Labour | Sam Pollen | 954 | 58.5 |
| Labour | Tom Higgins | 904 | 55.4 |
| Conservative | Archibald Reid | 486 | 29.8 |
| Conservative | Harry Berger | 360 | 22.1 |
| Conservative | Christopher Turner | 354 | 21.7 |
| Majority | | 418 | 25.6 |
| Turnout | | 1,632 | 35.0 |
| Labour win (new seat) | | | |
| Labour win (new seat) | | | |
| Labour win (new seat) | | | |

=== Gosforth & Seascale ===
Gosforth & Seascale
| Party | Candidate | Votes | % |
|---|---|---|---|
| Conservative | David Moore | Unopposed | |
| Conservative | Andrew Pratt | Unopposed | |
| Majority | | | |
| Turnout | | – | – |
| Conservative win (new seat) | | | |
| Conservative win (new seat) | | | |

=== Hillcrest ===
Hillcrest
| Party | Candidate | Votes | % | ±% |
|---|---|---|---|---|
| Labour | Allan Forster | 663 | 44.4 | |
| Conservative | Brian O'Kane | 646 | 43.3 | |
| Conservative | Russell Studholme | 645 | 43.2 | |
| Conservative | Alistair Norwood | 572 | 38.3 | |
| Labour | Joseph Ghayouba | 521 | 34.9 | |
| Majority | | 73 | 4.9 | |
| Turnout | | 1,492 | 36.0 | |
| Labour hold | | | | |
| Conservative hold | | | | |
| Conservative win (new seat) | | | | |

=== Kells ===
Kells
| Party | Candidate | Votes | % | ±% |
|---|---|---|---|---|
| Labour | John Kane | 230 | 46.8 | |
| Independent | Christopher Hayes | 209 | 42.6 | |
| Conservative | Brigid Whiteside | 52 | 10.6 | |
| Majority | | 21 | 4.3 | |
| Registered electors | | 1,713 | | |
| Turnout | | 499 | 29.0 | |
| Rejected ballots | | 10 | 2.0 | |
| Labour gain from Independent | | Swing | | |

=== Millom ===
Millom
| Party | Candidate | Votes | % |
|---|---|---|---|
| Conservative | James Date | 827 | 57.6 |
| Conservative | Felicity Wilson | 654 | 45.5 |
| Conservative | Fred Gleaves | 618 | 43.0 |
| Labour | Denise Burness | 559 | 38.9 |
| Labour | Bob Kelly | 489 | 34.0 |
| Majority | | 59 | 4.1 |
| Turnout | | 1,437 | 32.0 |
| Conservative win (new seat) | | | |
| Conservative win (new seat) | | | |
| Conservative win (new seat) | | | |

=== Moor Row & Bigrigg ===
Moor Row & Bigrigg
| Party | Candidate | Votes | % |
|---|---|---|---|
| Labour | Graham Calvin | 387 | 57.8 |
| Conservative | Jean Lewthwaite | 248 | 37.1 |
| Liberal Democrats | Mike Minogue | 34 | 5.1 |
| Majority | | 139 | 20.8 |
| Registered electors | | 1,755 | |
| Turnout | | 688 | 39.0 |
| Rejected ballots | | 19 | 2.8 |
| Labour win (new seat) | | | |

=== Moresby ===
Moresby
| Party | Candidate | Votes | % | ±% |
|---|---|---|---|---|
| Labour | Reginald Minshaw | 271 | 51.4 | |
| Conservative | Martin Barbour | 256 | 48.6 | |
| Majority | | 15 | 2.8 | |
| Turnout | | 538 | 37.0 | |
| Labour gain from Conservative | | Swing | | |

=== Sneckyeat ===
Sneckyeat
| Party | Candidate | Votes | % |
|---|---|---|---|
| Labour | Jeanette Forster | 377 | 75.0 |
| Conservative | Stephen Haraldsen | 126 | 25.0 |
| Majority | | 251 | 49.9 |
| Turnout | | 528 | 30.0 |
| Labour win (new seat) | | | |

=== St. Bees ===
St. Bees
| Party | Candidate | Votes | % | ±% |
|---|---|---|---|---|
| Conservative | Jeffrey Hailes | 404 | 64.2 | |
| Labour | Alan Alexander | 225 | 35.8 | |
| Majority | | 179 | 28.5 | |
| Turnout | | 667 | 38.0 | |
| Conservative hold | | Swing | | |

=== Whitehaven Central ===
Whitehaven Central
| Party | Candidate | Votes | % |
|---|---|---|---|
| Independent | Charles Maudling | 622 | 42.8 |
| Labour | Sean Cullen | 561 | 38.6 |
| Labour | Eileen Weir | 532 | 36.6 |
| Conservative | Carla Arrighi | 456 | 31.4 |
| Conservative | Graham Roberts | 456 | 31.4 |
| Labour | Christopher Reay | 380 | 26.2 |
| Conservative | Elizabeth Hutson | 280 | 19.3 |
| Majority | | 76 | 5.2 |
| Turnout | | 1,453 | 33.0 |
| Independent win (new seat) | | | |
| Labour win (new seat) | | | |
| Labour win (new seat) | | | |

=== Whitehaven South ===
Whitehaven South
| Party | Candidate | Votes | % |
|---|---|---|---|
| Independent | Carl Walmsley | 669 | 50.2 |
| Labour | Mike Hawkins | 570 | 42.8 |
| Labour | Peter Tyson | 502 | 37.7 |
| Labour | Andi Rutherford | 437 | 32.8 |
| Conservative | Graham Hutson | 173 | 13.0 |
| Conservative | Doreen Platt | 170 | 12.8 |
| Conservative | Jonathan Spencer | 165 | 12.4 |
| Majority | | 65 | 4.9 |
| Registered electors | | 5,311 | |
| Turnout | | 1,332 | 25.0 |
| Rejected ballots | | 16 | 1.2 |
| Independent win (new seat) | | | |
| Labour win (new seat) | | | |
| Labour win (new seat) | | | |

== Changes 2019–2023 ==
- Millom councillor Fred Gleaves (Conservative) died on 3 September 2022, and a casual vacancy for Millom ward was declared on 27 September 2022; no by-election was called before the council's abolition.
- Copeland Borough Council was abolished on 1 April 2023, and its area became part of the new Cumberland Council; no further ordinary election to Copeland Borough Council was held after 2019.

=== By-elections ===
==== Whitehaven Central ====
Whitehaven Central by-election, 6 May 2021
| Party | Candidate | Votes | % | ±% |
|---|---|---|---|---|
| Labour | Joseph Ghayouba | 633 | 47.7 | |
| Conservative | William R C S Dixon | 542 | 40.8 | |
| Independent | Richard Donnan | 90 | 6.8 | |
| Heritage Party: Free Speech and Liberty | William R Dixon | 45 | 3.4 | |
| Liberal Democrats | Mike Minogue | 18 | 1.4 | |
| Turnout | | | 29.9 | |
| Labour hold | | Swing | | |

The by-election was triggered by the disqualification of Labour councillor Sean Cullen for non-attendance, formally declared by the Returning Officer on 14 February 2020; the poll, originally due within 35 working days of that notice, was postponed because of the COVID-19 pandemic.
