= Cumbria Combined Authority =

Strategic authority and combined authority in England

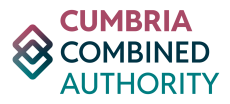

- The area of the combined authority

Type
- Type: Combined authority of Cumbria

History
- Founded: 24 February 2026

Leadership
- Chair: Mark Fryer, Labour since 18 March 2026
- Seats: Cumberland Council 2 Westmorland and Furness Council 2

Meeting place
- Eden Rural Enterprise Centre, Redhills, Penrith

Website
- www.cumbria-ca.gov.uk

The Cumbria Combined Authority is a combined authority comprising the unitary authorities of Cumberland Council and Westmorland and Furness Council. It was established on 24 February 2026, and covers the ceremonial county of Cumbria, whose county council was abolished in 2023. The authority will have a directly elected mayor, with elections to be held in May 2027.

== Background ==
Discussions for a devolution deal for the county began before Cumbria County Council's 2023 abolition, with Michael Gove, the then Secretary of State for Housing, Local Government and Communities expressing his wish to extend devolution to the county, once the process of establishing new councils had completed.

The 2023 restructuring of local government in Cumbria saw the county split into two authorities, essentially East and West, creating the Cumberland, and Westmorland and Furness, authorities. These two new authorities replaced Cumbria County Council, which ceased to exist on 1 April 2023. Its duties, including roads, schools and social services, fell to the newly created authorities.

=== Devolution deal ===
A deal put to Cumberland Council and Westmorland and Furness Council in 2025 included more powers and funding for transport, skills and housing through a Devolution Framework, which would transfer some powers currently held by the UK Government to the new combined authority. Five voting members of the combined authority would exist, with four coming from the two councils and one being the directly-elected mayor.

The deal was accepted by both councils on 14 October 2025. A £1 million package from the government was allocated to help establish the combined authority, as well as access to a Mayoral Investment Fund of £333 million over the course of 30 years. The authority will be established in early 2026, operating for a year without a mayor. There is precedent from past newly-formed combined authorities that an interim mayor be appointed, but it is unknown if this will happen in Cumbria.

The combined authority was established on 24 February 2026 by the Cumbria Combined Authority Order 2026 (SI 2026/158) made on 23 February 2026.

== Structure ==
=== Mayor of Cumbria ===
The 2027 Cumbria mayoral election, on 6 May 2027, will elect the first Mayor of Cumbria.

The mayor will be a member of the Mayoral Council for England and the Council of the Nations and Regions.

Ahead of the election of the mayor, the combined authority's board chooses one of its members to chair the body. At the board's inaugural meeting on 18 March 2026, it chose Mark Fryer, leader of Cumberland Council, to chair the board for its first year.

=== Combined Authority Board ===
Each constituent authority nominates two members to the Combined Authority Board.

Board members

Name	Nominating authority
Mark Fryer	Cumberland Council
Lisa Hinton	Cumberland Council
Jonathan Brook	Westmorland and Furness Council
Andrew Jarvis	Westmorland and Furness Council
