= 2022 Cumberland Council election =

2022 UK local government election

- 5 May 2022

All 46 seats to Cumberland Council 24 seats needed for a majority

	First party	Second party	Third party
Party	Labour	Conservative	Liberal Democrats
Seats won	30	7	4
Popular vote	29,586	25,842	6,677
Percentage	39.1%	34.1%	8.8%
	Fourth party	Fifth party
Party	Independent	Green
Seats won	3	2
Popular vote	9,144	4,074
Percentage	12.1%	5.4%
Council control after election
Mark Fryer
Labour

The first election to Cumberland Council was held on 5 May 2022, with all 46 seats contested. The election created a shadow authority for the new unitary authority, which operated alongside Allerdale Borough Council, Carlisle City Council, Copeland Borough Council and Cumbria County Council for eleven months. On 1 April 2023, Cumberland Council assumed the functions of those councils within its area.

== Results ==
Labour won 30 seats, fourteen more than all the other parties and independents combined. Labour councillor Mark Fryer was appointed leader at the shadow authority's inaugural meeting.

Party	Councillors				Votes		
Party		Of total	Net			Of total	Net
Labour Party	30	65.2%		30 / 46	29,586	39.1%	
Conservative Party	7	15.2%		7 / 46	25,842	34.1%	
Independents	3	6.5%		3 / 46	9,144	12.1%	
Liberal Democrats	4	8.7%		4 / 46	6,677	8.8%	
Green	2	4.3%		2 / 46	4,074	5.4%	
Trade Unionist and Socialist Coalition	0	0.0%		0 / 46	256	0.3%	
Reform UK	0	0.0%		0 / 46	69	0.1%	
Heritage Party	0	0.0%		0 / 46	50	0.1%	

Changes are shown from the Cumbria County Council elections in 2017

== Ward results (Allerdale area) ==
=== Aspatria ===
Aspatria
Party	Candidate	Votes	%	±%
Independent	Kevin Thurlow	575	40.0	N/A
Conservative	John Cook	454	31.6	−7.8
Labour	Peter Kendall	273	19.0	+1.6
Green	Alison Parker	79	5.5	N/A
Liberal Democrats	Lauren Exley	55	3.8	−32.6
Turnout		1,436	34.5	
Independent gain from Conservative		Swing		

=== Bothel & Wharrels ===
Bothel & Wharrels
Party	Candidate	Votes	%	±%
Green	Jill Perry	870	42.5	+9.3
Conservative	Malcolm Grainger	805	39.3	−27.5
Independent	Fran Eilbeck	374	18.3	N/A
Turnout		2,049	48.9	
Green gain from Conservative		Swing		

=== Cockermouth North ===
Cockermouth North
Party	Candidate	Votes	%	±%
Labour	Helen Tucker	1,025	44.9	+18.1
Conservative	Catherine Bell	896	39.3	+9.4
Liberal Democrats	Fiona Jayatilaka	360	15.8	−24.0
Turnout		2,281	43.2	
Labour gain from Liberal Democrats		Swing		

=== Cockermouth South ===
Cockermouth South
Party	Candidate	Votes	%	±%
Labour	Andrew Semple	1,065	44.8	+15.6
Conservative	Michael Pemberton	878	36.9	−19.3
Green	Keith Fitton	227	9.5	+5.2
Liberal Democrats	Stephen Barnes	207	8.7	−1.6
Turnout		2,377	47.7	
Labour gain from Conservative		Swing		

=== Dearham & Broughton ===
Dearham & Broughton
Party	Candidate	Votes	%	±%
Labour	Martin Harris	806	43.9	+4.9
Conservative	Neil Rumbold	547	29.8	−19.2
Independent	Nicky Cockburn	484	26.3	N/A
Turnout		1,837	38.8	
Labour gain from Conservative		Swing		

=== Harrington ===
Harrington
Party	Candidate	Votes	%	±%
Labour	Denise Rollo	605	42.3	+9.9
Conservative	Chris Clarkin	350	24.5	+10.1
Independent	Hilary Harrington	294	20.6	N/A
Independent	Herbert Briggs	181	12.7	N/A
Turnout		1,430	29.7	
Labour gain from Independent		Swing		

=== Keswick ===
Keswick
Party	Candidate	Votes	%	±%
Labour	Markus Campbell-Savours	1,340	67.9	+16.3
Independent	Clive Hutchby	319	16.2	N/A
Conservative	Elaine Haraldsen	315	16.0	−17.6
Turnout		1,974	46.3	
Labour hold		Swing		

=== Maryport North ===
Maryport North
Party	Candidate	Votes	%	±%
Labour	Carni McCarron-Holmes	675	37.7	−1.0
Independent	George Kemp	645	36.0	−1.7
Conservative	Steve Newton-Lister	472	26.3	+7.7
Turnout		1,792	36.7	
Labour hold		Swing		

=== Maryport South ===
Maryport South
Party	Candidate	Votes	%	±%
Labour	Bill Pegram	692	54.5	−18.2
Independent	James Kirkbride	384	30.3	N/A
Conservative	Anthony Todd	193	15.2	−5.9
Turnout		1,269	26.9	
Labour hold		Swing		

=== Moss Bay and Moorclose ===
Moss Bay and Moorclose
Party	Candidate	Votes	%	±%
Independent	Stephen Stoddart	631	45.2	−9.9
Labour	Neil Schofield	560	40.1	+8.6
Conservative	Jacqueline Kirkbride	204	14.6	+2.4
Turnout		1,395	27.7	
Independent hold		Swing		

=== Seaton ===
Seaton
Party	Candidate	Votes	%	±%
Labour	Jimmy Grisdale	766	45.1	−3.4
Conservative	Colin Sharpe	535	31.5	−15.2
Independent	Paul Scott	252	14.8	N/A
Green	Alistair Grey	76	4.5	−0.3
Reform	David Surtees	69	4.1	N/A
Turnout		1,698	35.1	
Labour hold		Swing		

=== Solway Coast ===
Solway Coast
Party	Candidate	Votes	%	±%
Conservative	Tony Markley	993	66.6	+16.2
Green	Sharon Watson	498	33.4	+29.4
Turnout		1,491	34.4	
Conservative hold		Swing		

=== St John's & Great Clifton ===
St John's & Great Clifton
Party	Candidate	Votes	%	±%
Labour	Mark Fryer	859	44.4	+8.3
Conservative	Deb Garton	571	29.5	+8.5
Independent	Peter Gaston	439	22.7	N/A
Green	Fliss Watts	66	3.4	+0.4
Turnout		1,935	38.0	
Labour gain from Independent		Swing		

=== St Michael's ===
St Michael's
Party	Candidate	Votes	%	±%
Labour	Barbara Cannon	649	48.6	−16.2
Independent	Will Wilkinson	347	26.0	N/A
Conservative	John Connell	287	21.5	−1.0
Liberal Democrats	Margaret Bennett	53	4.0	−5.7
Turnout		1,336	29.7	
Labour hold		Swing		

=== Thursby ===
Thursby
Party	Candidate	Votes	%	±%
Conservative	Mike Johnson	906	48.5	−24.8
Independent	Jonathan Graham	452	24.2	N/A
Labour	Shane McCarthy	328	17.6	−1.8
Liberal Democrats	Roger Peck	94	5.0	N/A
Green	Dianne Standen	87	4.7	−2.6
Turnout		1,867	43.4	
Conservative hold		Swing		

=== Wigton ===
Wigton
Party	Candidate	Votes	%	±%
Labour	Elaine Lynch	738	39.7	−13.4
Conservative	Alan Pitcher	714	38.4	−5.9
Independent	Sandra Hodson	407	21.9	N/A
Turnout		1,859	34.2	
Labour hold		Swing		

== Ward results (Carlisle area) ==
=== Belah ===
Belah
Party	Candidate	Votes	%	±%
Green	Helen Davison	944	45.4	N/A
Conservative	Gareth Ellis	756	36.4	−11.9
Labour	David Graham	277	13.3	−14.1
Independent	Alan Toole	101	4.9	−19.4
Turnout		2,078	42.5	
Green gain from Conservative		Swing		

=== Belle Vue ===
Belle Vue
Party	Candidate	Votes	%	±%
Labour	Abdul Harid	788	52.7	+6.6
Conservative	James Bainbridge	706	47.3	+2.3
Turnout		1,494	32.1	
Labour hold		Swing		

=== Botcherby ===
Botcherby
Party	Candidate	Votes	%	±%
Independent	Robert Betton	553	39.6	−10.4
Labour	Louise Atkinson	470	33.6	+6.9
Conservative	Marilyn Bowman	305	21.8	+0.9
Green	Robert Inglis	69	4.9	+2.4
Turnout		1,397	29.5	
Independent hold		Swing		

=== Brampton ===
Brampton
Party	Candidate	Votes	%	±%
Conservative	Mike Mitchelson	752	42.9	−12.6
Green	Tom Adams	720	41.0	+32.9
Labour	Iain Owens	282	16.1	−4.6
Turnout		1,754	39.9	
Conservative hold		Swing		

=== Castle ===
Castle
Party	Candidate	Votes	%	±%
Labour	Anne Glendinning	562	48.2	+4.8
Green	Gavin Hawkton	313	26.8	+21.9
Conservative	Syed Ali	264	22.6	−11.1
TUSC	Rob Heal	27	2.3	N/A
Turnout		1,166	29.2	
Labour hold		Swing		

=== Corby & Hayton ===
Corby & Hayton
Party	Candidate	Votes	%	±%
Liberal Democrats	Roger Dobson	1,090	59.9	+49.7
Independent	Raymond Tinnion	423	23.3	N/A
Conservative	Timothy Cheetham	306	16.8	−18.2
Turnout		1,819	46.6	
Liberal Democrats gain from Independent		Swing		

=== Currock ===
Currock
Party	Candidate	Votes	%	±%
Labour	Lisa Brown	630	63.2	+8.7
Conservative	Fiona Robson	286	28.7	−1.3
TUSC	Brent Kennedy	81	8.1	N/A
Turnout		997	24.1	
Labour hold		Swing		

=== Dalston & Burgh ===
Dalston & Burgh
Party	Candidate	Votes	%	±%
Liberal Democrats	Trevor Allison	1,142	47.7	+0.7
Conservative	James White	779	32.6	−9.3
Labour	Alex Key	472	19.7	+8.6
Turnout		2,393	40.0	
Liberal Democrats hold		Swing		

=== Denton Holme ===
Denton Holme
Party	Candidate	Votes	%	±%
Labour	Christopher Southward	779	58.8	−1.2
Conservative	Ann McKerrell	329	24.8	−2.2
Liberal Democrats	Stuart Kelly	118	8.9	N/A
TUSC	Grahame Higginson	99	7.5	N/A
Turnout		1,325	28.4	
Labour hold		Swing		

=== Harraby North ===
Harraby North
Party	Candidate	Votes	%	±%
Labour	Cyril Weber	708	64.6	−2.7
Conservative	Robert Currie	339	30.9	−1.8
TUSC	Ernie Percival	49	4.5	N/A
Turnout		1,096	24.4	
Labour hold		Swing		

=== Harraby South ===
Harraby South
Party	Candidate	Votes	%	±%
Labour	Lucy Patrick	634	40.9	−3.9
Conservative	Linda Mitchell	547	35.3	−8.4
Independent	Sean Reed	369	23.8	N/A
Turnout		1,550	35.3	
Labour hold		Swing		

=== Houghton & Irthington ===
Houghton & Irthington
Party	Candidate	Votes	%	±%
Conservative	John Mallinson	1,024	59.2	−6.5
Liberal Democrats	Paul Nettleton	389	22.5	+14.2
Labour	Beth Furneaux	317	18.3	+2.8
Turnout		1,730	39.9	
Conservative hold		Swing		

=== Longtown ===
Longtown
Party	Candidate	Votes	%	±%
Liberal Democrats	Timothy Pickstone	949	66.2	N/A
Conservative	Sam Bown	485	33.8	−40.2
Turnout		1,434	36.9	
Liberal Democrats gain from Conservative		Swing		

=== Morton ===
Morton
Party	Candidate	Votes	%	±%
Labour	Anne Quilter	630	46.5	−12.4
Conservative	Neville Lishman	599	44.2	+9.3
Green	Donna Bertoletti	125	9.2	+3.0
Turnout		1,354	30.3	
Labour hold		Swing		

=== Stanwix Urban ===
Stanwix Urban
Party	Candidate	Votes	%	±%
Liberal Democrats	Brian Wernham	1,472	60.7	N/A
Conservative	Elizabeth Mallinson	559	23.1	−33.9
Labour	Paul Atkinson	271	11.2	−16.6
Independent	Paul Nedved	123	5.1	N/A
Turnout		2,425	52.2	
Liberal Democrats gain from Conservative		Swing		

=== Upperby ===
Upperby
Party	Candidate	Votes	%	±%
Labour	Chris Wills	744	65.8	+13.3
Conservative	Leighton Rees	386	34.2	+3.2
Turnout		1,130	25.9	
Labour hold		Swing		

=== Wetheral ===
Wetheral
Party	Candidate	Votes	%	±%
Conservative	Geoff Mitchell	1,173	53.3	−11.9
Labour	Ruth Alcroft	607	27.6	+12.5
Liberal Democrats	Julia Dobson	419	19.1	+3.7
Turnout		2,199	40.3	
Conservative hold		Swing		

=== Yewdale ===
Yewdale
Party	Candidate	Votes	%	±%
Labour	Jeanette Whalen	944	54.2	+16.4
Conservative	Stephen Haraldsen	797	45.8	−0.7
Turnout		1,741	37.9	
Labour gain from Conservative		Swing		

== Ward results (Copeland area) ==
=== Bransty ===
Bransty
Party	Candidate	Votes	%	±%
Labour	Joseph Ghayouba	1,043	63.4	+24.1
Conservative	Charles Maudling	461	28.0	+12.6
Independent	Ryan Redmond	71	4.3	N/A
Independent	Sean Cullen	69	4.2	N/A
Turnout		1,644	38.5	
Labour gain from Conservative		Swing		

Charles Maudling stood as an independent in 2017, and the change is shown from his vote in that election. The change from the Conservative candidate's vote was -14.6%.

=== Cleator Moor East & Frizington ===
Cleator Moor East & Frizington
Party	Candidate	Votes	%	±%
Labour	Linda Jones-Bulman	847	58.9	+13.0
Conservative	Christopher Turner	443	30.8	−16.4
Independent	Aliscia Wood	149	10.4	N/A
Turnout		1,439	34.2	
Labour gain from Conservative		Swing		

=== Cleator Moor West ===
Cleator Moor West
Party	Candidate	Votes	%	±%
Labour	Michael Eldon	1,087	72.1	+21.4
Conservative	Ged McGrath	343	22.8	−4.8
Independent	Rhiannon Connors	77	5.1	N/A
Turnout		1,507	33.7	
Labour hold		Swing		

=== Egremont ===
Egremont
Party	Candidate	Votes	%	±%
Labour	Sam Pollen	1,185	72.1	+18.3
Conservative	Jeffrey Hailes	465	22.8	−23.4
Independent	Shane Branthwaite	97	5.1	N/A
Turnout		1,747	38.1	
Labour hold		Swing		

=== Egremont North & St Bees ===
Egremont North & St Bees
Party	Candidate	Votes	%	±%
Labour	Reginald Minshaw	747	50.5	+18.5
Conservative	Chri Whiteside	572	38.7	−4.0
Independent	Louis Thomason	159	10.8	N/A
Turnout		1,478	34.5	
Labour gain from Conservative		Swing		

=== Gosforth ===
Gosforth
Party	Candidate	Votes	%	±%
Conservative	David Moore	989	48.4	−12.5
Labour	James Dickaty	916	44.8	+28.2
Liberal Democrats	Mike Minogue	139	6.8	N/A
Turnout		2,044	43.6	
Conservative hold		Swing		

=== Hillcrest & Hensingham ===
Hillcrest & Hensingham
Party	Candidate	Votes	%	±%
Labour	Jeanette Forster	831	51.6	+2.1
Conservative	Hugh O'Kane	568	35.3	−15.2
Independent	Edwin Dinsdale	211	13.1	N/A
Turnout		1,610	37.7	
Labour gain from Conservative		Swing		

=== Howgate ===
Howgate
Party	Candidate	Votes	%	±%
Labour	Gillian Troughton	678	45.5	+2.2
Conservative	Martin Barbour	500	33.6	−14.0
Independent	Kevin Young	238	16.0	N/A
Heritage	William Dixon	50	3.4	N/A
Independent	Eren McGuire	23	1.5	N/A
Turnout		1,489	33.8	
Labour gain from Conservative		Swing		

=== Kells & Sandwith ===
Kells & Sandwith
Party	Candidate	Votes	%	±%
Labour	Emma Williamson	1,046	73.6	+21.8
Conservative	Arthur Creighton	302	21.3	−10.4
Independent	Tanisha Dobinson	73	5.1	N/A
Turnout		1,421	29.1	
Labour hold		Swing		

=== Millom ===
Millom
Party	Candidate	Votes	%	±%
Labour	Bob Kelly	667	51.4	+20.0
Conservative	Doug Wilson	630	48.6	−20.0
Turnout		1,297	30.1	
Labour gain from Conservative		Swing		

=== Millom Without ===
Millom Without
Party	Candidate	Votes	%	±%
Conservative	Andy Pratt	862	55.3	−17.6
Labour	Anne Todd	507	32.5	+14.7
Liberal Democrats	Jeff Amos	190	12.2	N/A
Turnout		1,559	40.5	
Conservative hold		Swing		

=== Mirehouse ===
Mirehouse
Party	Candidate	Votes	%	±%
Labour	Mike Hawkins	536	39.6	−26.6
Independent	Wammo Walmsley	477	35.2	N/A
Conservative	Oliver Dorgan	195	14.4	−19.4
Independent	Gemma Dinsdale	112	8.3	N/A
Independent	Tony Lowrey	35	2.6	N/A
Turnout		1,355	33.6	
Labour hold		Swing		

== Changes 2022–2027 ==
- On 3 March 2023, Chris Wills (Upperby) left Labour and joined the Liberal Democrats.
- On 2 June 2023, Trevor Allison (Dalston & Burgh) left the Liberal Democrats and joined the Conservatives.
- By the end of January 2025, Linda Jones-Bulman (Cleator Moor East & Frizington) had left Labour to sit as an independent.
- On 18 March 2025, Mike Hawkins (Mirehouse) left Labour to sit as an independent.
- On 7 May 2025, Helen Tucker (Cockermouth North) left Labour and joined the Green Party.

Following Lucy Patrick's resignation in July 2026, the council comprised 25 Labour councillors, eight Conservatives, five independents, four Liberal Democrats and three Greens, with one vacancy.

=== By-elections ===
==== Harraby North ====
The by-election followed the death of Labour councillor Cyril Weber on 4 April 2024.

Harraby North: 27 June 2024
Party	Candidate	Votes	%	±%
Labour	Justin McDermott	455	60.5	−4.1
Conservative	Robert Currie	165	21.9	−9.0
Liberal Democrats	Sarah Wills	70	9.3	N/A
Green	Perri Conner	62	8.2	N/A
Majority		290	38.6	
Turnout		752	16.64	−7.8
Labour hold		Swing		

==== Keswick ====
The by-election was triggered by the resignation of councillor Markus Campbell-Savours after his election as MP for Penrith and Solway at the 2024 general election.

Keswick: 17 October 2024
Party	Candidate	Votes	%	±%
Labour	Sally Lansbury	513	50.7	−17.2
Conservative	Graham King	384	38.0	+22.0
Green	Jane Hall	85	8.4	N/A
Liberal Democrats	John Rivers	29	2.9	N/A
Majority		129	12.7	
Turnout		1,011	24.46	−21.8
Labour hold		Swing		

==== Wetheral ====
The by-election followed the resignation of Conservative councillor Geoff Mitchell.

Wetheral: 17 October 2024
Party	Candidate	Votes	%	±%
Conservative	Gareth Ellis	665	51.6	−1.7
Liberal Democrats	Sarah Wills	463	35.9	+16.8
Labour	Ruth Alcroft	160	12.4	−15.2
Majority		202	15.7	
Turnout		1,288	22.17	−18.1
Conservative hold		Swing		

==== Harraby South ====
The by-election was triggered by the resignation of Labour councillor Lucy Patrick.

Harraby South by-election: 20 August 2026
Party	Candidate	Votes	%	±%
Reform	Josh Kirkwood	560	42.4	N/A
Labour	Ruth Alcroft	469	35.5	−5.4
Conservative	Rob Currie	236	17.9	−17.4
Green	Rose-Ellen Kemp	29	2.2	N/A
Liberal Democrats	Stuart Kelly	23	1.7	N/A
Majority		91	6.9	+1.3
Turnout		1,320	27.9	−7.4
Registered electors		4,733		
Reform gain from Labour				
