= Mayor of Copeland =

Directly elected mayoralty

- Style: No courtesy title or style
- Appointer: Electorate of Copeland
- Term length: Four years
- Formation: May 2014 referendum
- First holder: Mike Starkie
- Final holder: Mike Starkie
- Abolished: 1 April 2023
- Salary: £50,000
- Website: http://www.copelandbc.gov.uk/section/mike-starkie-elected-mayor

The Mayor of Copeland was a directly elected mayoralty, first elected on 7 May 2015, taking on the executive function of Copeland Borough Council in Cumbria, England. The first and only mayor was Mike Starkie, elected as an independent candidate in 2015 and 2019 but later joining the Conservative Party. The post was scrapped in the reorganisation of local government in Cumbria in April 2023.

== Referendum ==
A petition to change the status of the borough from one with a leader and cabinet to one with an executive mayor was submitted in February 2014. On 22 May 2014, a referendum was held (concurrent with elections to the European Parliament), at which voters opted to change to a mayoral system.

Mayor of Copeland Referendum 22 May 2014
Choice	Votes	%
Elected Mayor	12,671	69.77
Cabinet System	5,489	30.23
Total	18,160	100.00
Registered voters/turnout		33.9

== 2015 election ==
The election was initially planned for October 2014, but this was later delayed to May 2015 to save money. The contest took place on the same day as the election of borough councillors and the UK general election.

Copeland mayoral election 7 May 2015
Party	Candidate	1st round		2nd round			1st round votesTransfer votes, 2nd round
Party	Candidate	Total	Of round	Transfers	Total	Of round	1st round votesTransfer votes, 2nd round
Independent	Mike Starkie	9,836	30.5%	5,397	15,233	51.2%	
Labour	Steve Gibbons	12,867	39.9%	1,662	14,529	48.8%	
Conservative	Chris Whiteside	9,509	29.5%				
Turnout		32,212					
Independent win							

== 2019 election ==
Copeland mayoral election 2 May 2019
Party	Candidate	1st round		2nd round			1st round votesTransfer votes, 2nd round
Party	Candidate	Total	Of round	Transfers	Total	Of round	1st round votesTransfer votes, 2nd round
Independent	Mike Starkie	10,008	57%				
Labour	Linda Jones-Bulman	4,544	26%				
Conservative	Gerard McGrath	2,895	17%				
Turnout		17,447					
Independent hold							
