= Julie Minns =

British politician

Julie Minns MP
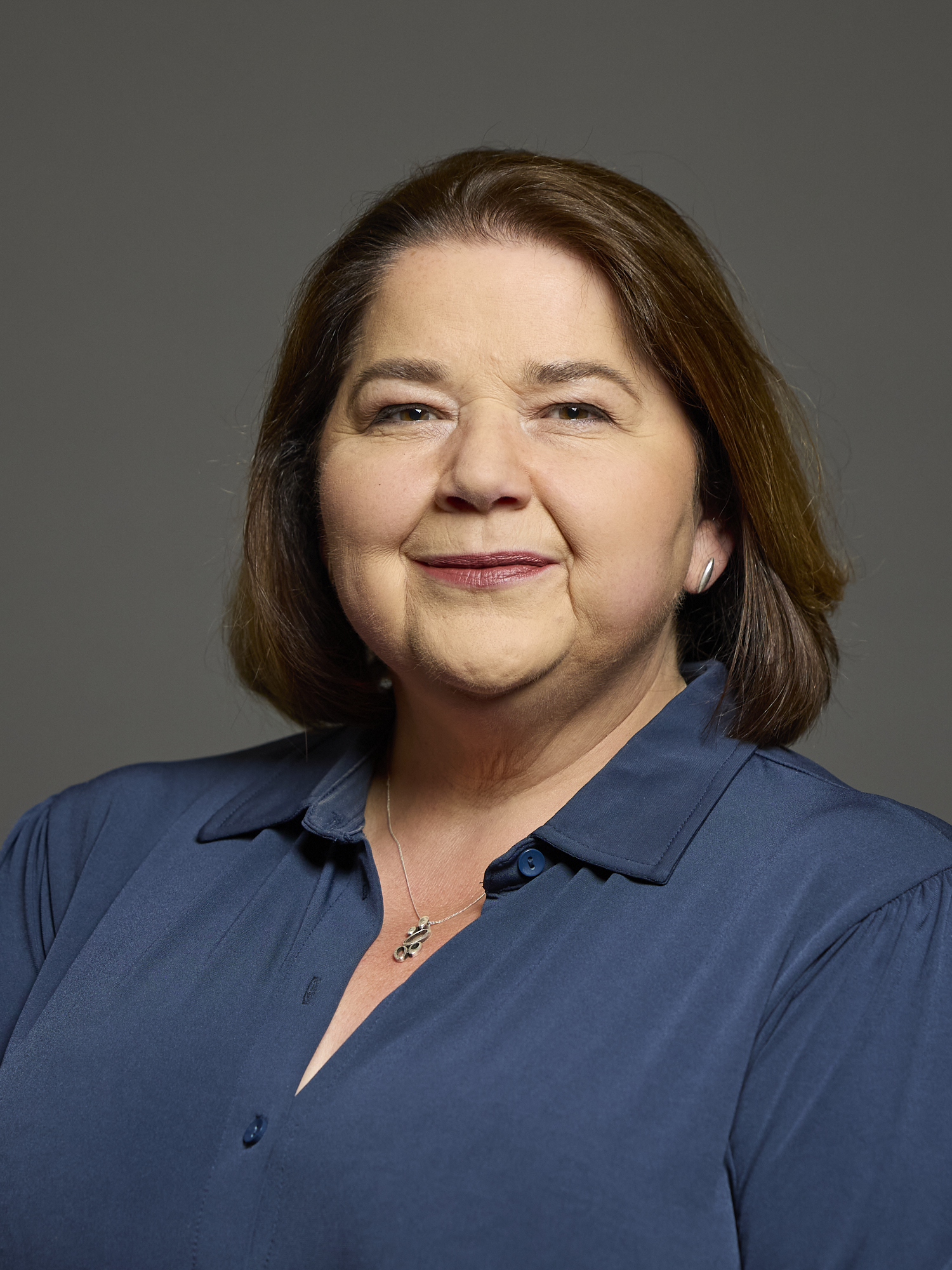
- Official portrait, 2024

Member of Parliament for Carlisle
- Incumbent
- Assumed office 4 July 2024
- Preceded by: John Stevenson
- Majority: 5,200 (11.3%)

Member of Lambeth London Borough Council for Thornton
- In office 7 May 1998 – 2 May 2002

Personal details
- Born: 11 December 1968 (age 57) Carlisle, Cumberland, England
- Party: Labour

Julie Minns (born 11 December 1968) is a British politician who has served as the Member of Parliament (MP) for Carlisle since 2024. A member of the Labour Party, Minns is the first female MP to represent the constituency.

== Early life ==
=== Family ===
Minns's father, who died in 2007, was a painter and decorator whilst her mother, Freda, who died in 2025, was a former home-help. Minns is a distant cousin of Ernest Lowthian, who was the first Labour politician to stand for election to the UK parliament in the Carlisle constituency, and her great-grandfather John Hodgson-Minns, was a Conservative councillor and alderman of the city.

=== Childhood and education ===
Minns was born in Carlisle. She grew up in the Denton Holme area of the city and attended Robert Ferguson School and Trinity School, Carlisle.

== Career ==
After graduating from Newcastle University, Minns was a National Officer for Labour Students. She worked on John Smith's Labour leadership campaign, and as a parliamentary adviser to former Streatham Labour MP Keith Hill.

Minns was elected to Lambeth London Borough Council in 1998 as a councillor for Thornton ward, and held the transport portfolio whilst serving on the council. She did not seek re-election in 2002, choosing to step down to bring up her daughter as a single parent.

Before entering Parliament, Minns worked as a freelance communications consultant. Prior to this, she worked in industry as head of customer engagement at UK Power Networks. She spent 13 years in corporate affairs, regulatory and corporate responsibility roles at UK mobile network operator Three UK. While at Three, Minns gave evidence to the Northern Ireland Assembly and UK Parliament Select Committees, and led on the network’s work on child protection, helping draw-up the joint Code of Practice for the self-regulation of new forms of content on mobile phones in order to protect children from inappropriate material in 2004.

She was a parliamentary adviser for the NSPCC and a parliamentary officer for the disability rights charity Scope, where she co-wrote a report on access to voting for disabled people in the 1997 general election.

Minns held a part-time consultancy role at public relations, reputation management, and marketing company Bell Pottinger in 2014. She then was a partner at the company from January 2015 to August 2016. The company went out of business in 2017 following a scandal related to the Gupta family, who had an account with the company from January 2016. In 2023 Private Eye magazine claimed that Minns had attempted to conceal her employment by the company in her online profile. Minns responded by correcting her profile and confirming that she had left the company over a year before its closure.

Minns was founder and Chair of the Friends of Carlisle Victorian and Turkish Baths charity, which works to restore and reopen the Carlisle Turkish baths.

From 2005 to 2008, Minns was a director of Living Streets (UK). She was also Chair of Governors at Archbishop Sumner Primary School.

== Parliamentary career (2024–present) ==
Minns was selected as the Labour Party candidate for the Carlisle constituency in February 2023, through a local selection process. She was elected to Parliament in the 2024 UK general election with a majority of 5,200 votes and is the constituency's first female MP.

On 16 July 2024, Minns requested a meeting with water regulator Ofwat after it was revealed that the regulator was expanding its investigation into how companies manage sewer treatment, and subsequently welcomed the probe into United Utilities; stating that the Labour government would not tolerate "sewage being pumped into our rivers, lakes and seas ".

In July 2024, Minns joined the Labour Growth Group on the Starmerite right-wing of the party, and was amongst the original 54 MPs who wrote a letter to Prime Minister Keir Starmer asking him to deliver on the party's manifesto commitment to build 1.5 million homes by the end of the current parliament.

Following the government announcement that the Winter Fuel Allowance was to be removed from pensioners not in receipt of Pension Credit, the issue was discussed and voted on by MPs on the 10th of September 2024 with Minns voting in favour of the government position to remove the payment.

In November 2024, Minns was appointed a Parliamentary private secretary to the Department for Transport (DfT).

== Personal life ==
Minns has a daughter, who is a nurse.

Parliament of the United Kingdom
| Preceded by John Stevenson | Member of Parliament for Carlisle; 2024–present | Incumbent |
