= Westmorland County Council =

Defunct county council in England

History
- Founded: 1 April 1889
- Disbanded: 1 April 1974
- Succeeded by: Cumbria County Council

Meeting place
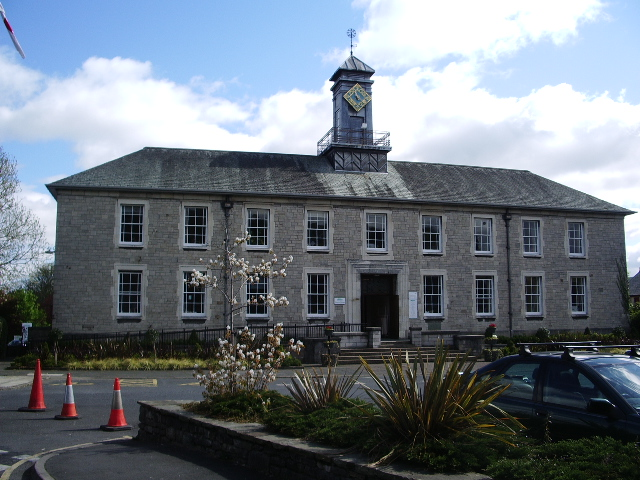
- County Offices, Kendal

Westmorland County Council was the county council of Westmorland in north west England. It came into its powers on 1 April 1889 and was abolished on 1 April 1974. The county council was initially based at the Town Hall in Kendal and then, from 1939, based at the County Offices in Kendal. It was amalgamated with Cumberland County Council to form the new Cumbria County Council in 1974.

In April 2023 local government in Cumbria was reorganised into two unitary authorities, one of which is named Westmorland and Furness and includes most of the historic county of Westmorland, together with Penrith and the surrounding area, together with the Furness peninsula, and an area centred on Sedbergh.
