= 2007 Copeland Borough Council election =

2007 UK local government election

Map of the results of the 2007 Copeland council election. Labour in red, Conservatives in blue and independent in white.

The 2007 Copeland Borough Council election took place on 3 May 2007 to elect members of Copeland Borough Council in Cumbria, England. The whole council was up for election and the Labour Party stayed in overall control of the council.

== Election result ==
The results saw Labour remain in control of the council after staying on 31 seats. The Conservatives made a gain of 3 seats to have 19 councillors, at the expense of independents, while just 1 independent managed to win a seat.

Copeland local election result 2007
Party	Seats	Gains	Losses	Net gain/loss	Seats %	Votes %	Votes	+/−
Labour	31	2	2	0	60.8	53.1	18,314	-4.6%
Conservative	19	3	0	+3	37.3	43.6	15,023	+8.6%
Independent	1	0	3	-3	2.0	1.6	551	-2.1%
Liberal Democrats	0	0	0	0	0	1.7	573	-1.9%

2 Conservative candidates were unopposed.

== Ward results ==
Arlecdon
Party	Candidate	Votes	%	±%
Independent	Joseph Sunderland	241	54.0	−17.0
Conservative	Marie Simpson	106	23.8	+23.8
Labour	Cam Ross	99	22.2	−6.8
Majority		135	30.3	−11.7
Turnout		446		
Independent hold		Swing		

Beckermet (2)
Party	Candidate	Votes	%	±%
Conservative	Yvonne Clarkson	604	42.0	
Conservative	John Jackson	579	40.3	
Labour	John Woolley	255	17.7	
Turnout		1,438		
Conservative hold		Swing		
Conservative hold		Swing		

Bootle
Party	Candidate	Votes	%	±%
Conservative	Keith Hitchen	unopposed		
Conservative hold		Swing		

Bransty (3)
Party	Candidate	Votes	%	±%
Conservative	Christopher Whiteside	651		
Conservative	Allan Mossop	636		
Conservative	Alexander Carroll	617		
Labour	James Hewitson	508		
Labour	Les Hanley	453		
Labour	Jeanette Williams	435		
Turnout		3,300		
Conservative hold		Swing		
Conservative gain from Labour		Swing		
Conservative gain from Labour		Swing		

Cleator Moor North (3)
Party	Candidate	Votes	%	±%
Labour	Joan Hully	540		
Labour	William Southward	525		
Labour	Hugh Branney	497		
Conservative	Doreen Platt	217		
Turnout		1,779		
Labour hold		Swing		
Labour hold		Swing		
Labour hold		Swing		

Cleator Moor South (2)
Party	Candidate	Votes	%	±%
Labour	Catherine Giel	386		
Labour	David Banks	365		
Conservative	Hilda Morris	148		
Turnout		899		
Labour hold		Swing		
Labour hold		Swing		

Distington (3)
Party	Candidate	Votes	%	±%
Labour	Willis Metherell	523		
Labour	Brian Dixon	495		
Labour	John Bowman	465		
Liberal Democrats	Frank Hollowell	357		
Conservative	Victoria Vincent	229		
Turnout		2,069		
Labour hold		Swing		
Labour hold		Swing		
Labour gain from Independent		Swing		

Egremont North (3)
Party	Candidate	Votes	%	±%
Labour	Elaine Woodburn	740		
Labour	Samuel Meteer	724		
Labour	Margaret Woodburn	724		
Conservative	Kenneth Kirkby	273		
Conservative	Mary Holmes	241		
Conservative	John Brown	186		
Turnout		2,888		
Labour hold		Swing		
Labour hold		Swing		
Labour hold		Swing		

Egremont South (3)
Party	Candidate	Votes	%	±%
Labour	Michael McVeigh	667		
Labour	Peter Watson	618		
Labour	Constance Watson	580		
Conservative	John Coyles	488		
Conservative	John Holmes	488		
Conservative	Jean Lewthwaite	465		
Turnout		3,306		
Labour hold		Swing		
Labour hold		Swing		
Labour hold		Swing		

Ennerdale
Party	Candidate	Votes	%	±%
Conservative	Robert Salkeld	204	58.3	−10.4
Liberal Democrats	Mike Minogue	86	24.6	+24.6
Labour	Mary Ross	60	17.1	−14.2
Majority		118	33.7	−3.7
Turnout		350		
Conservative hold		Swing		

Frizington (2)
Party	Candidate	Votes	%	±%
Labour	Peter Connolly	377		
Labour	Timothy Knowles	343		
Conservative	Kenneth Simpson	238		
Turnout		958		
Labour hold		Swing		
Labour gain from Independent		Swing		

Gosforth
Party	Candidate	Votes	%	±%
Conservative	Alan Jacob	328	71.0	−0.9
Labour	Christina Cornall	134	29.0	+0.9
Majority		194	42.0	−1.8
Turnout		462		
Conservative hold		Swing		

Harbour (3)
Party	Candidate	Votes	%	±%
Labour	John Kane	656		
Labour	Frances Bradshaw	574		
Labour	Henry Wormstrup	556		
Conservative	Brigid Whiteside	412		
Conservative	Andrew Welsh	403		
Conservative	Graham Roberts	385		
Turnout		2,986		
Labour hold		Swing		
Labour hold		Swing		
Labour hold		Swing		

Haverigg
Party	Candidate	Votes	%	±%
Conservative	Douglas Wilson	228	41.1	−8.3
Independent	Margaret Barnes	180	32.4	+32.4
Labour	Carl Carter	147	26.5	+26.5
Majority		48	8.6	
Turnout		555		
Conservative gain from Independent		Swing		

Hensingham (3)
Party	Candidate	Votes	%	±%
Labour	Geoffrey Garrity	562		
Labour	Norman Willams	501		
Labour	Margarita Docherty	454		
Conservative	Martyn Barnes	338		
Conservative	Marcus Swift	298		
Turnout		2,153		
Labour hold		Swing		
Labour hold		Swing		
Labour hold		Swing		

Hillcrest (2)
Party	Candidate	Votes	%	±%
Conservative	Alistair Norwood	468		
Conservative	Andrew Wonnacott	422		
Labour	Calvin Jones	265		
Turnout		1,155		
Conservative hold		Swing		
Conservative hold		Swing		

Holborn Hill (2)
Party	Candidate	Votes	%	±%
Conservative	Frederick Gleaves	396		
Labour	John Park	305		
Labour	Roland Woodward	281		
Conservative	Rowena Pitt	272		
Liberal Democrats	Jane Micklethwaite	130		
Independent	Neil Wilson	130		
Turnout		1,514		
Conservative hold		Swing		
Labour hold		Swing		

Kells (2)
Party	Candidate	Votes	%	±%
Labour	George Clements	273		
Labour	Alan Holliday	241		
Conservative	Glenn Gray	121		
Turnout		635		
Labour hold		Swing		
Labour hold		Swing		

Millom Without
Party	Candidate	Votes	%	±%
Conservative	Gilbert Scurrah	unopposed		
Conservative hold		Swing		

Mirehouse (3)
Party	Candidate	Votes	%	±%
Labour	Anne Faichney	648		
Labour	Edward Brenan	516		
Labour	Paul Whalley	462		
Conservative	Dorothy Wonnacott	150		
Conservative	George Higgins	141		
Conservative	Leah Higgins	135		
Turnout		2,052		
Labour hold		Swing		
Labour hold		Swing		
Labour hold		Swing		

Moresby
Party	Candidate	Votes	%	±%
Labour	Geoffrey Blackwell	200	54.3	−0.6
Conservative	Gareth Maley	168	45.7	+0.6
Majority		32	8.7	−1.1
Turnout		368		
Labour hold		Swing		

Newtown (3)
Party	Candidate	Votes	%	±%
Conservative	Francis Heathcote	722		
Conservative	Raymond Cole	718		
Conservative	Robin Pitt	475		
Labour	Anthony Gilmore	341		
Turnout		2,256		
Conservative hold		Swing		
Conservative hold		Swing		
Conservative hold		Swing		

Sandwith (2)
Party	Candidate	Votes	%	±%
Labour	Peter Tyson	243		
Labour	James Prince	202		
Conservative	David Gray	147		
Turnout		592		
Labour hold		Swing		
Labour hold		Swing		

Seascale (2)
Party	Candidate	Votes	%	±%
Conservative	David Moore	798		
Conservative	Eileen Eastwood	738		
Labour	Les Tuley	233		
Turnout		1,769		
Conservative hold		Swing		
Conservative hold		Swing		

St. Bees
Party	Candidate	Votes	%	±%
Conservative	Norman Clarkson	390	73.4	−1.2
Labour	Esther Clements	141	26.6	+1.2
Majority		249	46.9	−2.3
Turnout		531		
Conservative hold		Swing		
