= Cumbria House =

Municipal building in Carlisle, Cumbria, England

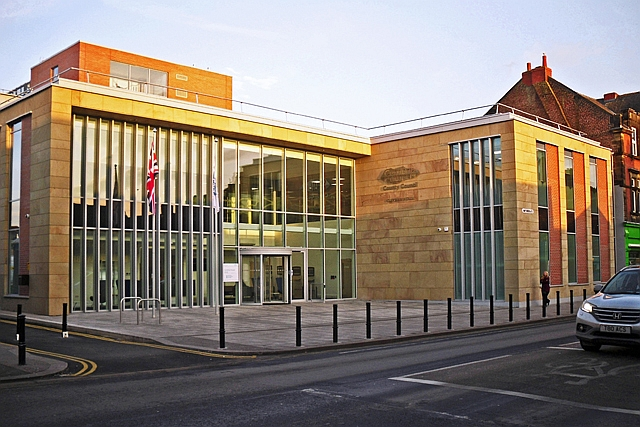
- Cumbria House

- Location within Cumbria

General information
- Location: 107–117 Botchergate, Carlisle CA1 1RD, United Kingdom
- Coordinates: 54.8901°N 2.9287°W
- Completed: 2016

Design and construction
- Architect: Eric Wright Construction

Cumbria House is a municipal building in the Botchergate area of Carlisle, England. It is used by Cumberland Council.

== History ==
Throughout much of the 20th century, the administration of Cumberland County Council had been carried out from the Courts in Carlisle. After amalgamation with Westmorland County Council in 1974, Cumbria County Council continued to use these facilities as well as a series of Victorian houses on Portland Square, Brunswick Street and Alfred Street North in Carlisle together with Lonsdale House in Lower Gaol Yard in Carlisle. In the early 21st century, as a cost-saving measure, council leaders decided to co-locate all council activities in a single building: the site they selected had been occupied by a former retail unit which had been converted for residential use (107-109 Botchergate) and a medical treatment centre (113-117 Botchergate).

The new building, which was designed by architects, AHR, and built by Eric Wright Construction, was completed in December 2016. The design for the steel framed building involved a wide glass and steel main frontage facing Botchergate with the right hand section projected forward. The footprint of the building, with the left hand section set back, was designed to create a forecourt in which people could safely protest without being at risk from road traffic.

The new offices were built to accommodate some 700 staff and to act as a catalyst for urban regeneration in the Botchergate area. Although the administrative offices of the County Council were at Cumbria House in Botchergate, formal meetings of the Council continued to be held at the County Offices in Kendal. In July 2019, the environmental movement, Extinction Rebellion, held a demonstration in the forecourt outside the building. In September 2022, it was decided that Cumbria House would become the new headquarters for Cumberland Council.
