= Cumberland Council =

Local authority of Cumberland, England

- Council logo

Type
- Type: Unitary authority

History
- Founded: 1 April 2023

Leadership
- Chair: Andrew Semple, Labour since 15 May 2024
- Leader: Mark Fryer, Labour since 1 April 2023
- Chief Executive: Andrew Seekings since 31 December 2022

Structure
- Seats: 46 councillors
- Graph of the party split among 46 seats.
- Political groups: Administration (25) Labour (25) Other parties (21) Conservative (8) Liberal Democrats (4) Green (3) Reform (1) Independent (5)
- Length of term: 4 years (from 2027)

Elections
- Voting system: First past the post
- Last election: 5 May 2022
- Next election: 6 May 2027

Meeting place
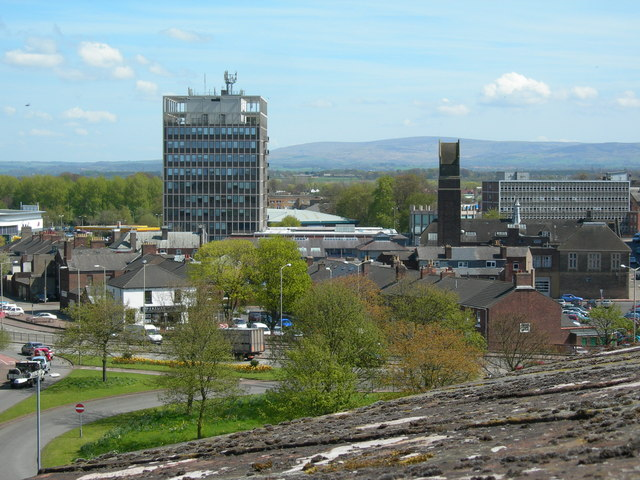
- Civic Centre, Rickergate, Carlisle, CA3 8QG

Website
- www.cumberland.gov.uk

Cumberland Council is the local authority for Cumberland, a local government district in the ceremonial county of Cumbria, England. It is a unitary authority, being a district council which also performs the functions of a county council. The council has been under Labour majority control since its creation 2023. Full council meetings are usually held at Carlisle Civic Centre and the main offices are at Cumbria House in Carlisle. The council is a constituent member of Cumbria Combined Authority.

== History ==
The modern district of Cumberland and its council were created in 2023. The district covers the combined area of the former districts of Allerdale, Carlisle and Copeland. The new council also took on the functions of the abolished Cumbria County Council in the area. Legally, Cumberland is both a non-metropolitan district and a non-metropolitan county, but there is no separate county council; instead the district council also performs county council functions, making it a unitary authority. For the purposes of lieutenancy and shrievalty, Cumberland remains part of the ceremonial county of Cumbria.

The district takes its name from the historic county of Cumberland, and covers about 77% of the area of the old county as it was prior to the 1974 reforms which had created the new county of Cumbria. In the 1974 reforms, Penrith, the Penrith Rural District and the Alston with Garrigill Rural District from Cumberland had been included in the Eden District, which became part of Westmorland and Furness in the 2023 reforms.

The inaugural election to the new council was held on 5 May 2022. It initially operated as a shadow authority alongside the area's outgoing authorities until 1 April 2023, when the new district and its council formally came into being.

In February 2026, the Cumbria Combined Authority was created to oversee certain strategic issues across both Cumberland and neighbouring Westmorland and Furness.

== Governance ==
Cumberland Council provides both district-level and county-level functions. Most of its area is also covered by civil parishes, which form an additional tier of local government for their areas. The only exception is Carlisle, which is unparished; the Cumberland councillors for the city serve as charter trustees instead of it having a parish council.

Much of the south of the district lies within the Lake District National Park. In that area, town planning is the responsibility of the Lake District National Park Authority. Cumberland Council appoints four of its councillors to serve on the 20-person National Park Authority.

The council is one of two constituent members of the mayoral Cumbria Combined Authority, along with Westmorland and Furness Council.

=== Political control ===
The council has been under Labour majority control since its creation.

Party in control	Years
Labour	2023–present

=== Leadership ===
The leader of the council since its creation has been Mark Fryer, a former leader of Allerdale Borough Council.

Councillor	Party	From	To
Mark Fryer	Labour	1 Apr 2023	

=== Composition ===
Following the 2022 election and subsequent by-elections and changes of allegiance up to August 2026, the composition of the council was:

Party	Seats
Labour	25
Conservative	8
Liberal Democrats	4
Green	3
Reform	1
Independent	5
Total	46

Three of the independent councillors sit together as a group. The next election is due in 2027.

== Elections ==
The district is divided into 46 wards, each electing one councillor. Elections are to be held every four years from 2027. Cumberland's wards are the same as the former electoral divisions used for electing county councillors from the area to the old Cumbria County Council, which had last been reviewed in 2013.

== Premises ==
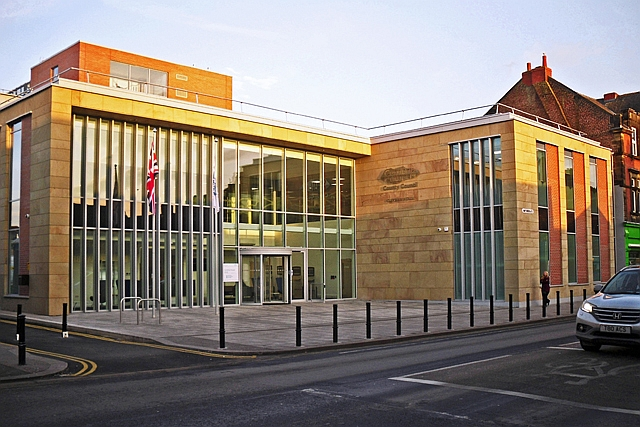
Cumbria House, 117 Botchergate, Carlisle, CA1 1RD: Council's main offices

The council inherited various offices from its predecessor authorities, including Allerdale House in Workington, the Copeland Centre in Whitehaven, and the Civic Centre and Cumbria House in Carlisle. Full council meetings are held at the Civic Centre, and Cumbria House is the council's official headquarters, with the other buildings being retained as local area offices.

== Branding ==
The council logo was approved at a meeting of the shadow executive on 20 July 2022. The logo draws on symbols found on the flag and coat of arms of the historic county of Cumberland. It features a Parnassus flower, the traditional county flower, wavy lines, which represent the fells, mountains, lakes and coast of the council area, and the colours blue and green, which are the livery colours of the traditional county. The council's flag consists of the emblem, without the text, on a white background.
