= Mike Starkie =

British politician

Mike Starkie is a British Conservative politician who was the directly elected mayor of Copeland, for the Borough of Copeland in Cumbria.

He stood as an independent, winning the 2015 election and beating the Labour candidate after transfer votes (the Conservatives were eliminated after coming last in the first round of votes). In June 2020, Starkie dropped his "independent" designation and announced he had joined the Conservative Party.

He is supportive of elected mayors, and has called for a referendum on having an elected mayor for the whole county of Cumbria. Starkie was the first and only Mayor of Copeland. His position was established (after a referendum) to replace the role of a Council leader and Cabinet. It was abolished as part of the local government reorganisation in Cumbria on 1 April 2023.

Starkie supported the Whitehaven coal mine project.

== Election results ==
Copeland mayoral election 7 May 2015
Party	Candidate	1st round		2nd round			1st round votesTransfer votes, 2nd round
Party	Candidate	Total	Of round	Transfers	Total	Of round	1st round votesTransfer votes, 2nd round
Independent	Mike Starkie	9,836	30.5%	5,397	15,233	51.2%	
Labour	Steve Gibbons	12,867	39.9%	1,662	14,529	48.8%	
Conservative	Chris Whiteside	9,509	29.5%				
Turnout		32,212					
Independent win							

Copeland mayoral election 2 May 2019
Party	Candidate	1st round		2nd round			1st round votesTransfer votes, 2nd round
Party	Candidate	Total	Of round	Transfers	Total	Of round	1st round votesTransfer votes, 2nd round
Independent	Mike Starkie	10,008	57%				
Labour	Linda Jones-Bulman	4,544	26%				
Conservative	Gerard McGrath	2,895	17%				
Turnout		17,447					
Independent hold							
