= Borough of Copeland =

Former borough and non-metropolitan district in England

Coordinates: 54.431°N 3.389°W

Copeland
- Borough and non-metropolitan district
- Coat of arms

- Copeland shown within Cumbria
- Sovereign state: United Kingdom
- Constituent country: England
- Region: North West England
- Ceremonial county: Cumbria
- Historic county: Cumberland
- Founded: 1 April 1974
- Abolished: 31 March 2023
- Administrative HQ: Whitehaven (The Copeland Centre)

Government
  - Type: Non-metropolitan district
  - Body: Copeland Borough Council

Area
  - Total: 282.53 sq mi (731.76 km^{2})

Population (2021)
  - Total: 67,176
  - Density: 237.76/sq mi (91.801/km^{2})

Ethnicity (2021 Census)
  - White: 98.0% Asian= 0.8% Black=0.3% Multiracial=0.7% Other groups=0.3% Arab=0.1% Any other group 0.2%
- Time zone: UTC+0 (Greenwich Mean Time)
  - Summer (DST): UTC+1 (British Summer Time)
- Postcode areas: CA (14, 18, 19, 20, 21, 22, 23, 24, 25, 26, 27, 28); LA (18, 19, 20)
- Dialling codes: 01229 (Barrow-in-Furness/Millom); 01946 (Whitehaven)
- Vehicle registration prefix: P
- GSS code: E07000029
- NUTS 3 code: UKD11
- ONS code: 16UE
- Trunk primary routes: A595
- Police area: Cumbria
- Fire service: Cumbria
- Ambulance service: North West
- Website: copeland.gov.uk

The Borough of Copeland was a local government district with borough status in western Cumbria, England. Its council was based in Whitehaven. It was formed on 1 April 1974 by the merger of the Borough of Whitehaven, Ennerdale Rural District and Millom Rural District. The population of the Non-Metropolitan district was 69,318 according to the 2001 census, increasing to 70,603 at the 2011 Census.

The name was derived from an alternative name for the Cumberland ward of Allerdale above Derwent, which covered roughly the same area.

There are different explanations for the name. According to a document issued at the time of the borough's grant of arms, the name is derived from kaupland, meaning "bought land," referring to an area of the Forest bought from the estate of St Bees Priory.

In July 2021 the Ministry of Housing, Communities and Local Government announced that in April 2023, Cumbria would be reorganised into two unitary authorities. On 1 April 2023, Copeland Borough Council was abolished and its functions were transferred to the new unitary authority Cumberland, which also covers the former districts of Allerdale and Carlisle.

== Demographics ==
In 2014 the borough of Copeland was found to have the fattest population in England with a percentage of 75.9% being either overweight or obese (BMI greater than 25) according to official PHE statistics.

In 2018 Copeland had the third highest median income of UK local authorities, after the City of London and Tower Hamlets. However this median hides the wide differences in income between those who work at the Sellafield nuclear reprocessing site and elsewhere in the borough, leading to Copeland being described as 'a community of two-halves'.

== Governance ==
Elections to the borough council were held every four years, with 51 councillors being elected at each election. From the first election in 1973 the council had been under Labour control, apart from between 1976 and 1979 when it was under no overall control. At the time of the final election in 2019 the council was composed of the following councillors:

Party	Councillors
Labour Party	19
Conservative Party	10
Independent	4

== Directly elected mayor ==
On 22 May 2014 a referendum was carried out in the borough to change the style of governance in Copeland to a directly elected mayor, after campaigners from the Time For Change team successfully obtained enough signatures from 5% of the electorate in a petition. The referendum result was: For: 12,671; Against: 5,489.

The first election for mayor was held on 7 May 2015 and Mike Starkie (elected as an Independent candidate, but later joining the Conservative Party) was elected by 15,232 votes to the Labour Party candidate Steve Gibbon's 14,259 votes.

== Freedom of the Borough ==
The following people and military units have received the Freedom of the Borough of Copeland.

- Gary McKee: 21 October 2017.

== Map ==
Places in Copeland
