= James Alexander Smith =

- Born: 5 January 1881; Workington, Cumberland, England
- Died: 21 May 1968 (aged 87); Middlesbrough, North Riding of Yorkshire, England
- Military career
- Allegiance: United Kingdom
- Branch: British Army
- Service years: 1894–1900; 1906–1910; 1914–1919
- Rank: Private
- Service number: 6423
- Units: Border Regiment
- Conflicts: World War I: Western Front
- Awards: Victoria Cross

Private James Alexander Smith VC (5 January 1881 – 21 May 1968) was born in Workington, Cumberland and was an English recipient of the Victoria Cross, the highest and most prestigious award for gallantry in the face of the enemy that can be awarded to British and Commonwealth forces. His birth name was James Alexander Glenn.

He was 33 years old, and a private in the 3rd Battalion, Border Regiment, British Army, attached to the 2nd Battalion, during the First World War. Smith and Abraham Acton from Whitehaven, were both awarded their Victoria Cross (VC) for their actions on 21 December 1914 at Rouges Bancs, France.

For conspicuous bravery on 21st December, at Rouges Bancs, in voluntarily going from their trench and rescuing a wounded man who had been lying exposed against the enemy's trenches for 75 hours, and on the same day again leaving their trench voluntarily, under heavy fire, to bring into cover another wounded man. They were under fire for 60 minutes whilst conveying the wounded men into safety.

His VC is displayed at Cumbria's Museum of Military Life, Carlisle Castle, Cumbria, England. Smith died on 21 May 1968 in Middlesbrough, North Riding of Yorkshire, aged 87.

== Bibliography ==
- Buzzell, Nora, ed. (1997). The Register of the Victoria Cross. Cheltenham, Gloucestershire: This England Alma House. ISBN 0-906324-27-0.
- Whitworth, Alan (2015). VCs of the North: Cumbria, Durham & Northumberland. Pen and Sword Books. ISBN 978-1473848221.
