= Jane Pearson =

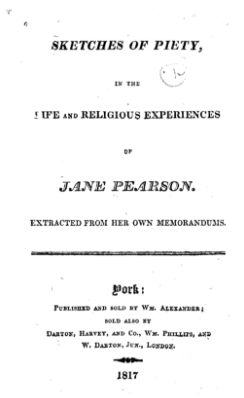
- her posthumous biography
- Born: Jane Sibson; 1735; Carlisle, Cumberland, England
- Died: 20 March 1816 (aged 80–81)
- Education: at home
- Occupation: minister
- Known for: her biography
- Spouse: John Pearson
- Children: 7

Jane Pearson or Jane Sibson (1735 – 20 March 1816) was a British Quaker minister and diarist.

== Life ==
Pearson was born in Newtown in Carlisle in about 1735. Her religious parents were Jonathan and Jane Sibson. She took notes on her life as she read the scriptures, which she found enjoyable. She wrote about the pain of losing her father and her understanding of God. Her mother was protective of her education and she employed a tutor so that she could be taught at home in line with their beliefs. Quakers were expected to have a "plainness of speech, behaviours and apparel".

Pearson's writings reveal that she was quiet and not confident, however she felt that she was intended to evangelise to others. Early in her twenties she married a fellow Quaker John Pearson. Her new husband was from Greysouthen in Cumbria and he made linen.

Pearson's husband was a comfort to her and when he died in June 1774 she recorded that she would have found it easier to lose her children than him. She was to lose all of them in time. Her youngest daughter died when she was nineteen and her last daughter died in 1806.

Pearson now began her ministry. For forty-two years she travelled and spoke at the meeting of Quaker women across Lancashire and Yorkshire. She wrote many letters including The correspondence with Thomas Wilkinson (1751–1836) and other Quaker ministers Esther Tuke, Deborah Darby whose family helped start the Industrial Revolution and the American born Rebecca Jones.

== Death and legacy ==
Pearson died in Whitehaven in 1816 having outlived her husband and all her children by ten years. Quaker funerals were sombre affairs. A note from Whitehaven dated 1800 warns fellow Quakers to only invite a select number to a funeral where the food should be sufficient. The aim was to allow those present to have "mournful yet instructive meditation."

In the year after her death, her writings were assembled into a book and published. This is the major source of her life. Some of her letters covering 1784 to 1821 are in the local records library.
