= Frank Schon, Baron Schon =

British manager and entrepreneur (1912–1995)

Frank Schon, Baron Schon (18 May 1912 – 7 January 1995) was an Austrian-born British industrialist and life peer, who served as Chairman of the National Research Development Corporation between 1969 and 1979.

== Biography ==
Schon was born in Vienna, the son of Dr Frederick Schon, a lawyer. He was educated at the Rainer Gymnasium. In 1931, he joined a chemicals firm with a subsidiary office in Prague, and studied law at the universities of Vienna and Prague as an external student.

In March 1939, ten days after the German invasion of Czechoslovakia, Schon, who was Jewish, escaped to Britain with his wife. He moved to Whitehaven and established Marchon Products, a chemicals firm, which became a leading supplier of detergent base. In 1956, he merged his firm with the rival firm Albright & Wilson, becoming a director of the latter. Due to a dispute with the board, he resigned from the firm in 1957.

Schon became a member of the Northern Economic Planning Council in 1965, the Industrial Reorganisation Corporation in 1966 and the advisory council of the Ministry of Technology in 1968. In 1969, Schon was appointed by Tony Benn to the chairmanship of the National Research Development Corporation, of which Schon had been a non-executive member since 1967. He held the office until 1979.

In the 1966 Queen's Birthday Honours, Schon was appointed a Knight Bachelor. On 27 January 1976, Schon was created a life peer, as Baron Schon of Whitehaven, in the county of Cumbria.

He is buried in the Liberal Jewish Cemetery, Willesden.

== Coat of arms ==
Coat of arms of Frank Schon, Baron Schon

Crest
In front of two factory chimneys smoking Proper on three mounts conjoined Proper a griffin segrant Argent.
Escutcheon
Per chevron chequly Vert and Or and lozengy of the same overall a comet in bend Argent on a bordure also Or six annulets Sable.
Supporters
Dexter a plant chemist wearing a white coat and protective eye shield and gloves holding in the dexter hand a beaker and in the sinister a flask, sinister a process worker habited in overalls and wearing a protective helmet and holding in the sinister hand a worksheet, all Proper.
Motto
Ad Honorem Industria Ducit
