= Charles Spackman =

English recipient of the Victoria Cross

Charles Edward Spackman
- Charles Spackman with the Prince of Wales (later King Edward VIII).
- Born: 11 January 1891; Fulham, London
- Died: 7 May 1969 (aged 78); Southampton, Hampshire
- Burial place: South Stoneham Crematorium, Southampton
- Military career
- Allegiance: United Kingdom
- Branch: British Army
- Rank: Sergeant
- Units: Border Regiment
- Conflicts: World War I
- Awards: Victoria Cross; Military Medal

Charles Edward Spackman VC, MM (11 January 1891 – 7 May 1969) was an English recipient of the Victoria Cross, the highest and most prestigious award for gallantry in the face of the enemy that can be awarded to British and Commonwealth forces.

He was 26 years old, and a sergeant in the 1st Battalion, Border Regiment, British Army during the First World War when the following deed took place for which he was awarded the VC.

On 20 November 1917 at Marcoing, France, the leading company was checked by heavy fire from a gun mounted on a position which covered the approaches. Sergeant Spackman, realising that it would be impossible for the troops to advance, went through heavy fire to the gun, where he succeeded in killing all but one of the gun crew and then captured the gun.

He was demobilised at the end of the war and rejoined the Border Regiment, as a part of the Territorial Force. He was issued serial number 3589576 in 1920.

Spackman was still a part of the Territorial Force when the Second World War broke out. He volunteered for duty at the outbreak of war in the Kings Royal Rifle Corps as a sergeant major.

== Bibliography ==
- Gliddon, Gerald (2004) [2012]. VCs of the First World War: Cambrai 1917. The History Press. ISBN 978-0-75-247668-1.
