= Abraham Acton =

Recipient of the Victoria Cross

Abraham Acton VC
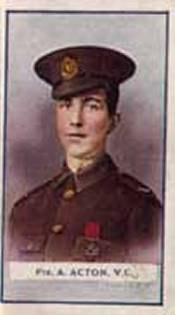
- Born: 17 December 1893; Whitehaven, Cumberland, United Kingdom
- Died: 16 May 1915 (aged 21); Festubert, France
- Military career
- Allegiance: United Kingdom
- Branch: British Army
- Service years: 1914–1915
- Rank: Private
- Unit: Border Regiment
- Conflicts: World War I: Western Front; Second Battle of Artois; Battle of Festubert †
- Awards: Victoria Cross

Abraham Acton VC (17 December 1893 – 16 May 1915) was an recipient of the Victoria Cross, the highest and most prestigious award for gallantry in the face of the enemy that can be awarded to and Commonwealth forces.

== Biography ==
Acton was born on 17 December 1893 to Robert and Elizabeth Eleanor Acton, of 4 Regent Square, Senhouse Street, Whitehaven in Cumberland.

He was 21 years old, and a private in the 2nd Battalion, The Border Regiment, British Army during the First World War. He and James Alexander Smith, were both awarded their Victoria Cross for their actions on 21 December 1914 at Rouges Bancs, France.

For conspicuous bravery on 21st December, at Rouges Bancs, in voluntarily going from their trench and rescuing a wounded man who had been lying exposed against the enemy's trenches for 75 hours, and on the same day again leaving their trench voluntarily, under heavy fire, to bring into cover another wounded man. They were under fire for 60 minutes whilst conveying the wounded men into safety.

He was killed in action at Festubert, France, on 16 May 1915, but his body was never found - he is commemorated on the Le Touret Memorial and the Orange Order memorial bench beside Ulster Tower.

His VC is displayed at The Beacon, Whitehaven, Cumbria, England. And he is mentioned at Cumbria's Museum of Military Life, Carlisle, England - where his friends VC is displayed.

== Bibliography ==
- Gliddon, Gerald (2011) [1994]. 1914. VCs of the First World War. Stroud, Gloucestershire: The History Press. ISBN 978-0752459080.
- Harvey, David (2000). Monuments to Courage. Naval & Military Press Ltd. ISBN 1-84342-356-1.
- Whitworth, Alan (2015). VCs of the North: Cumbria, Durham & Northumberland. Pen and Sword Books. ISBN 978-1473848221.
