= Malcolm Eccles =

Former Australian electrical executive and director

- Born: 1969 (age 56–57)
- Occupation: Utilities senior executive / Business owner

Malcolm Eccles (born 1969) is a utilities senior executive.

He retired in late 2022 and relocated from Australia to Northern Ireland. In 2023 he set-up his own consultancy business working part-time for various global energy projects, engagements have included projects in the UK, Germany, Morocco, Australia, Italy and UAE.

He was the chief executive officer and managing director of the Basslink group based in Melbourne, Australia from 2007 to 2022. Eccles was born in Whitehaven, Cumbria. In addition to his work with Basslink, he was non-executive director on the boards of City Gas (Singapore) from 2011 to 2015 and Gippsland Water (Australia) from 2011 to 2021. He was also a director and executive committee member of the International Cable Protection Committee (ICPC) from 2007 to 2022, he was Chair of the ICPC 2019-2022.

Eccles has been involved in high-voltage direct current and submarine cable technology since 2002. His engineering career commenced in 1986 when he served an apprenticeship with British Nuclear Fuels Ltd (BNFL). He stayed with BNFL for 16 years, leaving the organisation in 2002 to join Siemens PTD (power, transmission and distribution), now called Siemens Energy Sector. He worked with Siemens from 2002 until 2005, splitting his time between managing the O&M contract for the Moyle Interconnector and developing a services business. He joined National Grid (Basslink) in 2005 originally to recruit and train operational and engineering teams and to ensure the company was ready to operate in the Australian energy market.

National Grid plc sold the Basslink Interconector to CitySpring Infrastructure Trust on 31 August 2007. Eccles was appointed CEO of Basslink on 1 September 2007. After his appointment as CEO Basslink group expanded to include a wholesale telecoms business and an engineering consultancy businesses.

Eccles was actively engaged in the activities of the ICPC and International Council on Large Electric Systems.

== Personal life ==
Eccles grew up in Egremont and Whitehaven in Cumbria. He and his wife lived in Melbourne, Victoria 2005-2023. They relocated to Northern Ireland in 2023 when Eccles retired and spend time between homes in Northern Ireland and the Lake District.

Eccles is known as an active Freemason holding Grand rank and Provincial Grand rank in various Masonic orders.

He is also a known avid motorcyclist, owning several motorcycles.
