= Gerard Richardson (author) =

English author (born 1962)

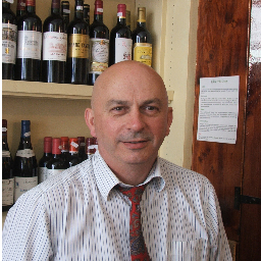
Gerard Richardson MBE DL

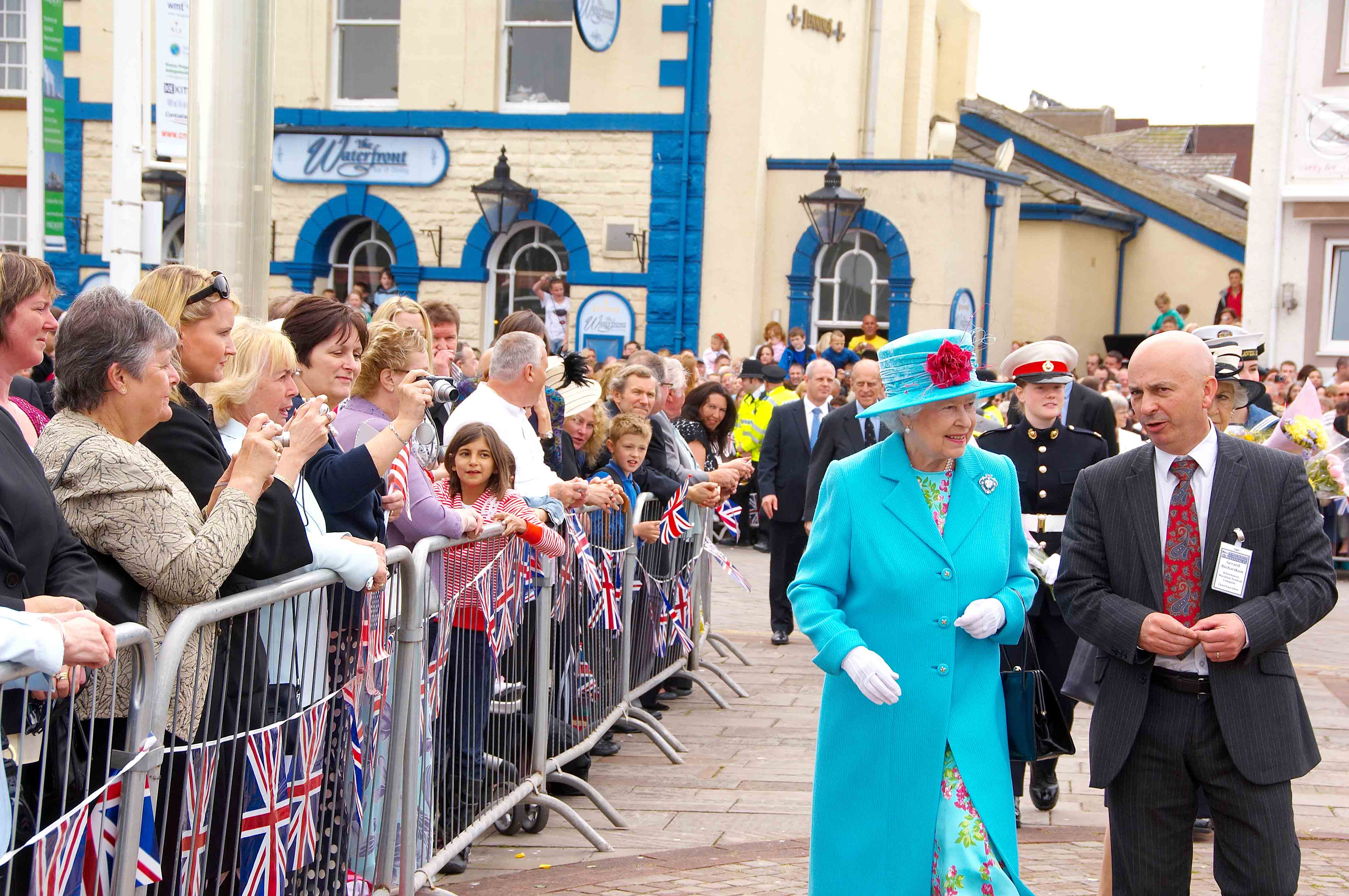
Royal Visit to Whitehaven 2008

Gerard Paul Richardson MBE DL born 4 January 1962 in Cleator Moor was the founder and CEO of the International Maritime Festivals which ran in Whitehaven from 1999 to 2013. He is also an author of two recipe books with Jean Christophe Novelli four local history books about Whitehaven & West Cumbria and a businessman in the town. He has served as a Magistrate since 1994 and was appointed as a Deputy Lieutenant for Cumbria on 29th April 2022.

He joined the Royal Navy as a Naval Air Engineer in 1981 and served until 1986 when he joined Sellafield, serving primarily as a Fireman. During this period he planned the Maritime Festivals, staging what was intended to be a one off event for up to 10,000 people in 1999. When an estimated 80,000 turned up, the Maritime Festival Company which ran the event decided to stage it every two years.

He is a drinks columnist for a number of Newquest newspapers in the UK.

== Whitehaven Maritime Festival Company ==
The festivals were held in 1999, 2001, 2003, 2005, 2007, 2009 and then annually until 2013. Between 2013 and 2015, the company organised two Home and Garden Festivals, a First World War Parade with air shows, and their final event was the Western Lakes Film Festival in June 2015. The latter event is credited with the temporary re-opening of the town's only cinema, the Gaiety, which closed 12 years earlier.

In addition to his work with the festivals, he also organised a number of other events during the same period. He announced his retirement from events in 2015, and the Festival Company closed down in 2016.

== Awards and honours ==
He was made a Member of the Order of the British Empire (MBE) in the Civil Division Medal for services to Cumbrian Tourism and services to the Community in the 2011 New Years Honours List.

Cumbrian News Lifetime Achievement in Business award 2012.

Cumbria Community Heroes Lifetime Achievement award 2015.

Commended by the United States Ambassador to the UK in 2010 for furthering relations between the UK and USA.

He was Appointed as a Deputy Lieutenant for the County of Cumbria on 18 April 2022. This gave him the Post Nominal Letters "DL" for Life.

== After retirement ==
He runs Richardson's of Whitehaven, a wine and coffee merchants, in the town and is working on his first novel.
