= Border Regiment =

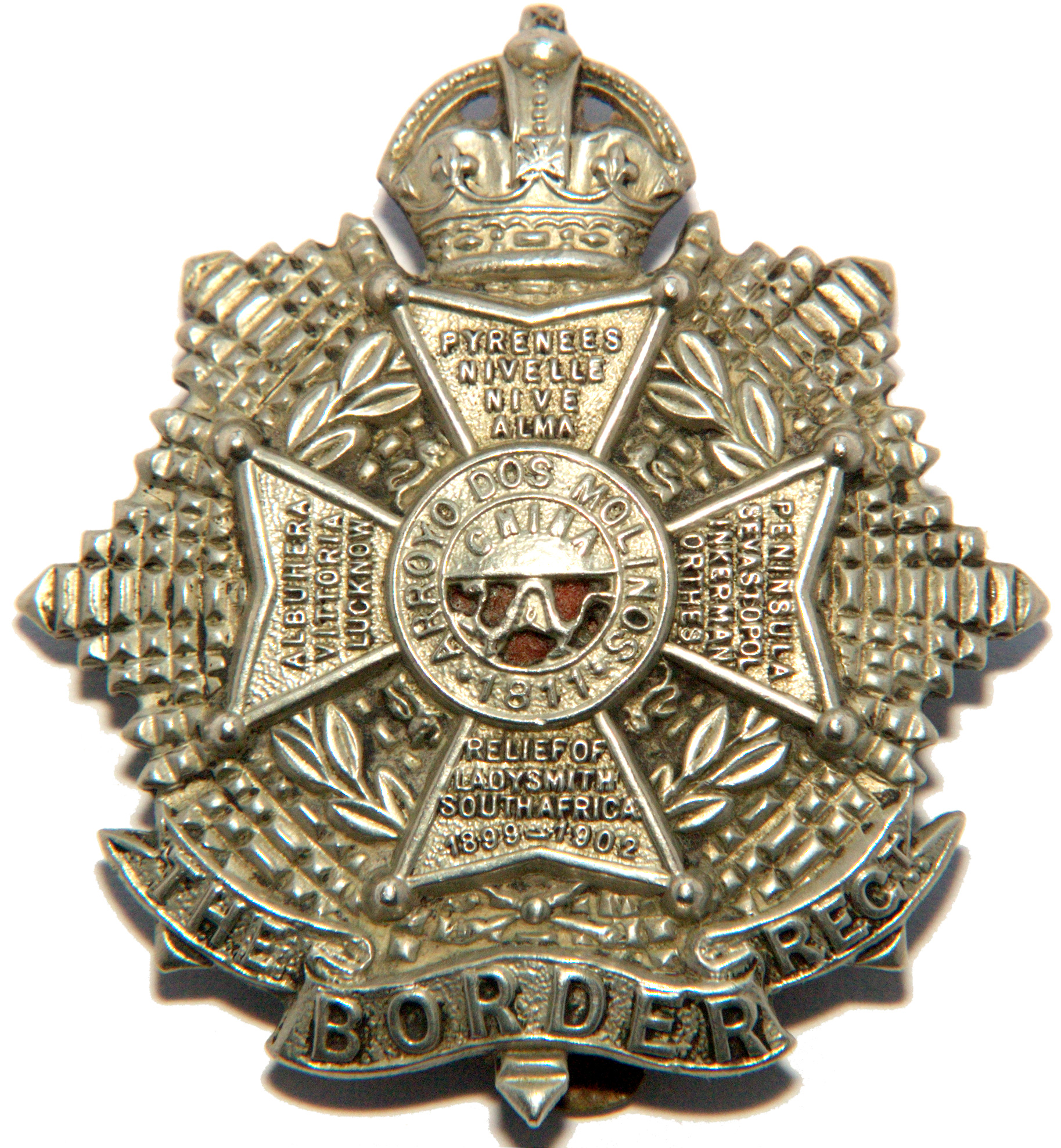
- Cap badge
- Active: 1881–1959
- Country: United Kingdom
- Branch: British Army
- Type: Infantry
- Role: Line infantry
- Size: 1–2 Regular battalions 1 Militia Battalion; 2 Territorial battalions Up to 12 Hostilities-only battalions
- RHQ: Carlisle Castle
- March: John Peel
- Anniversaries: 28 October Arroyo Day Commemorates an action in Spain when the 34th Foot captured the Drums of their French opposite numbers.
- Engagements: Second Boer War; World War I World War II

The Border Regiment was a line infantry regiment of the British Army, which was formed in 1881 under the Childers Reforms by the amalgamation of the 34th (Cumberland) Regiment of Foot and the 55th (Westmorland) Regiment of Foot.

After service in the Second Boer War, followed by both World War I and World War II, the regiment was amalgamated with the King's Own Royal Regiment (Lancaster) into the King's Own Royal Border Regiment in 1959, which was later merged with the King's Regiment (Liverpool and Manchester) and the Queen's Lancashire Regiment to form the present Duke of Lancaster's Regiment (King's, Lancashire and Border), which continues the lineage of the Border Regiment.

== History ==
=== 1881–1914 ===
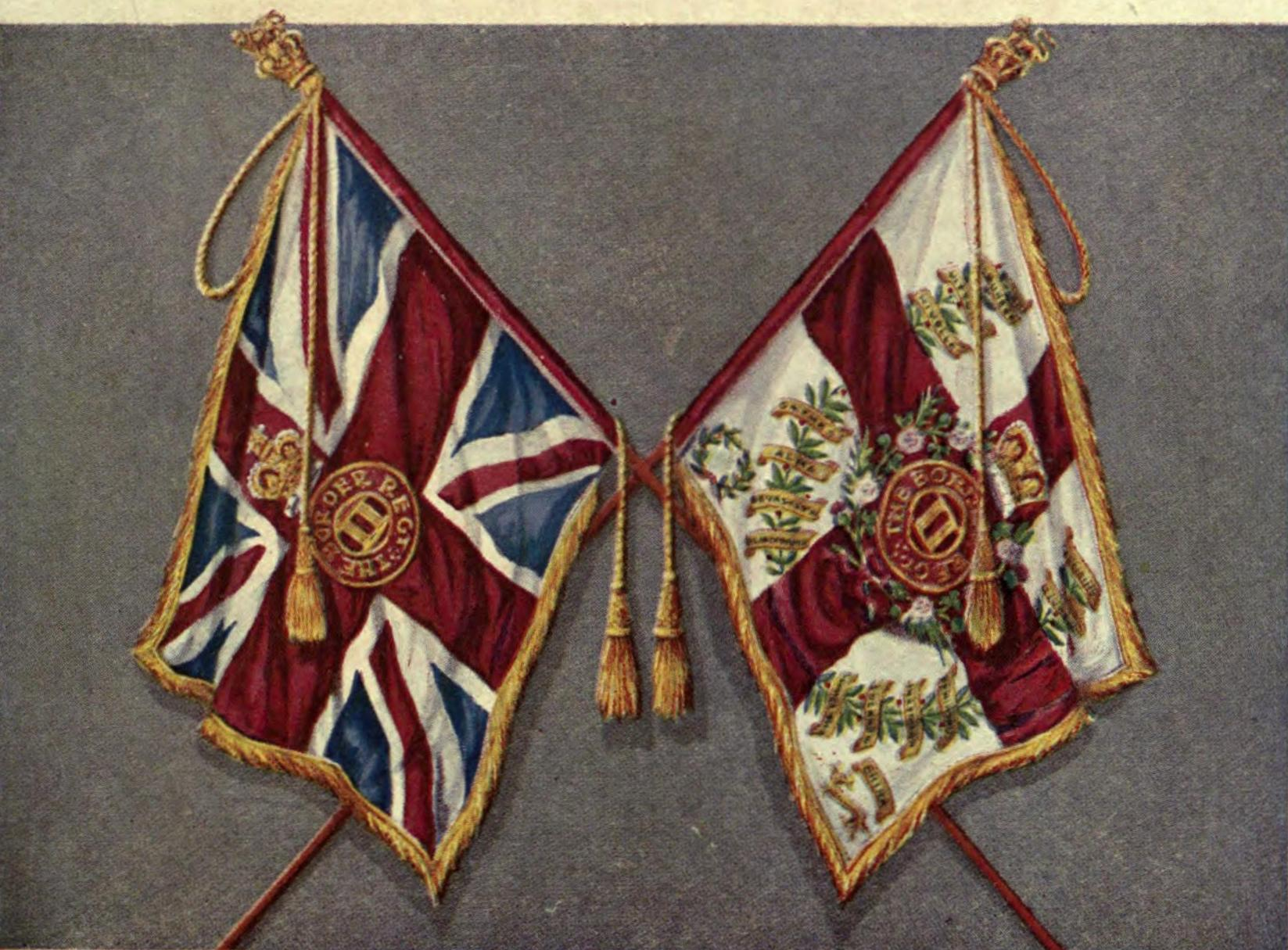
Colours of the Border Regiment

The regiment was formed on 1 July 1881 as part of the Childers Reforms by the amalgamation of the 34th (Cumberland) Regiment of Foot and the 55th (Westmorland) Regiment of Foot. Under the reforms, each line infantry regiment was to have a defined regimental district, with two regular battalions sharing a single permanent depot. At any one time, one battalion was to be on foreign service and one on "home" service.

In the case of the Border Regiment, the regimental district comprised the counties of Cumberland and Westmorland, with the depot established at Carlisle Castle. The outbreak of the Second Anglo-Boer War in 1899 found the British Army overstretched, and the 1st Battalion was one of many "home service" units dispatched to fight in the conflict. The battalion saw action at Colenso and Spion Kop as part of the campaign to relieve Ladysmith.

The two regular battalions were stationed as follows:

1st Battalion (ex 34th Foot)

- India and Burma 1881–1890
- England 1890–1897
- Malta 1897–1899
- South Africa 1899–1902
- England 1902–1908
- India and Burma 1908–1915

2nd Battalion (ex 55th Foot)

- Ireland, Channel Islands and Malta 1881–1890
- India and Burma 1890–1905 (Bareilly until late 1902, then Thayetmyo in Burma)
- South Africa 1905–1907
- England and Wales 1907–1914

The militia and rifle volunteers of Cumberland and Westmorland also became reserve battalions of the regiment in 1881: The Royal Cumberland Regiment of Militia and the Royal Westmorland Regiment of Militia became the 3rd and 4th Battalions respectively, while the rifle volunteers became the 1st (Cumberland) and 2nd (Westmorland) Volunteer Battalions. Detachments of these battalions saw service in the Boer War of 1899 – 1902, and a 3rd Volunteer Battalion was raised in 1900. In 1908, the Territorial and Reserve Forces Act 1907 reorganised the reserve battalions: the 4th Battalion was disbanded, while the 3rd was transferred to the Special Reserve, the volunteer battalions became units of the new Territorial Force as the 4th (Westmorland and Cumberland) Battalion at Strand Road in Carlisle and 5th (Cumberland) Battalion at Portland Square in Workington (since demolished).

=== First World War ===
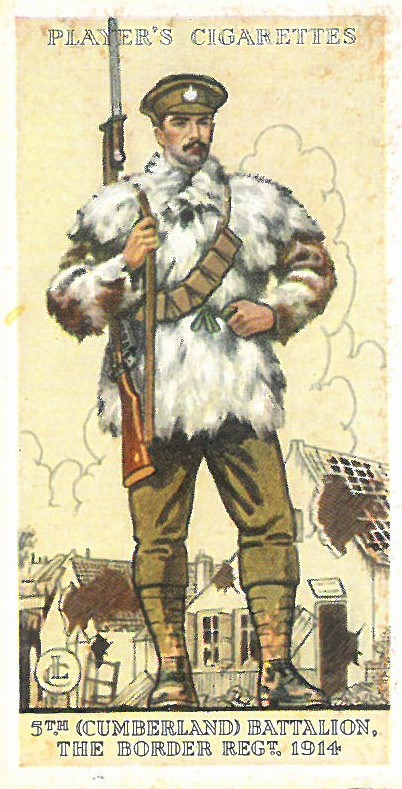
Player's cigarette card showing a lance corporal of the 5th (Cumberland) Battalion, The Border Regiment in 1914 while in France.

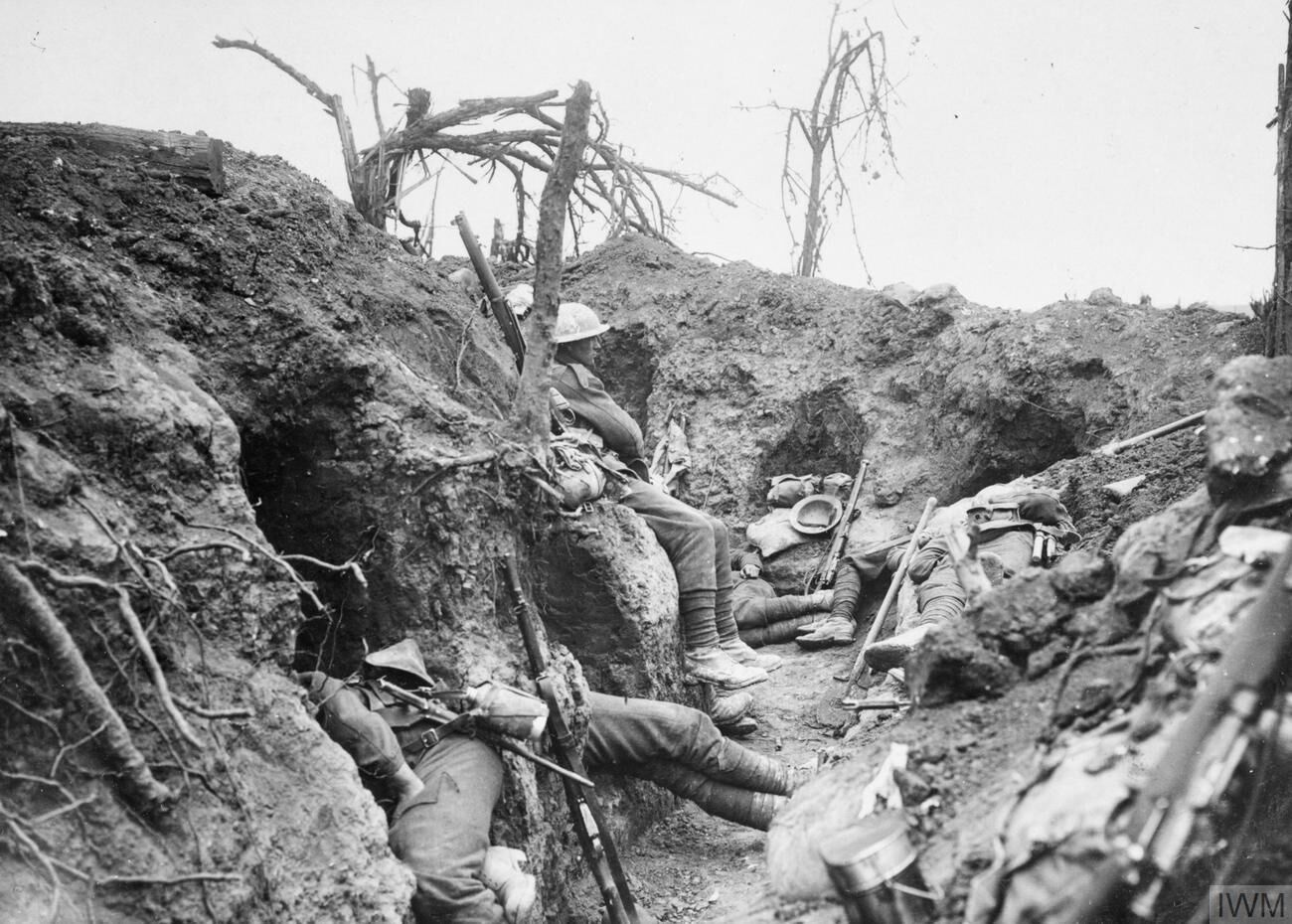
Troops of the Border Regiment resting in a front line trench in Thiepval Wood, France, August 1916.

In common with other infantry regiments, the Border Regiment was increased in size for the duration of the 1914–1918 war by the creation of additional battalions, either by the duplication of the existing territorial units or by the raising of new "service" battalions.

==== Victoria Crosses ====
Five men of the Border Regiment were awarded the Victoria Cross, all during the First World War:

- Private James Alexander Smith (21 December 1914)
- Private Abraham Acton (21 December 1914)
- Sergeant Edward John Mott (27 January 1917)
- Sergeant Charles Edward Spackman (20 November 1917)
- Captain (Acting Lieutenant-Colonel) James Forbes-Robertson (11/12 April 1918)

=== Inter War Period ===
By 1919, all the war-formed battalions had been disbanded and the system of rotating the two regular battalions had resumed. The 1st Battalion moved to the North West Frontier of India, where it was engaged in the Waziristan campaigns of 1919–1920 and 1921–1924. In 1924, it moved to Aden, returning to England in the following year. Apart from a brief spell in Shanghai in 1927, it remained in the United Kingdom until 1936, when it moved to Palestine to suppress the Arab revolt. It returned to England in the following year, and was based at Catterick Garrison when the Second World War broke out.

The 2nd Battalion was in Italy at the end of the First World War, remaining there until 1919. In that year, it moved to Ireland, where the War of Independence had broken out. Based in County Mayo, the battalion had few casualties, and returned to England at the end of the conflict in 1922. In the next few years, the 2nd Battalion was on garrison duty at various locations: Malta, The Sudan, Tientsin in China and Rawalpindi in India. The battalion was part of the force that suppressed the Afridi and Red Shirt Rebellions of 1930 – 1931. The battalion remained in India, and on the outbreak of the Second World War was stationed in Calcutta.

The 3rd (Reserve) Battalion was placed in "suspended animation" following the war, and was never embodied again. It was formally disbanded in 1953.

The two territorial battalions were reformed in 1920 as part of the renamed Territorial Army (TA). In April 1939, when it seemed clear war was likely to break out with Germany, the TA was doubled in size, with each existing unit forming a duplicate. When war broke out in September 1939, the four TA battalions were as follows:

- 4th (Westmorland and Cumberland) Battalion
- 5th (Cumberland) Battalion
- 6th (East Cumberland) Battalion
- 7th (Cumberland) Battalion

=== Second World War ===
==== Regular Army ====
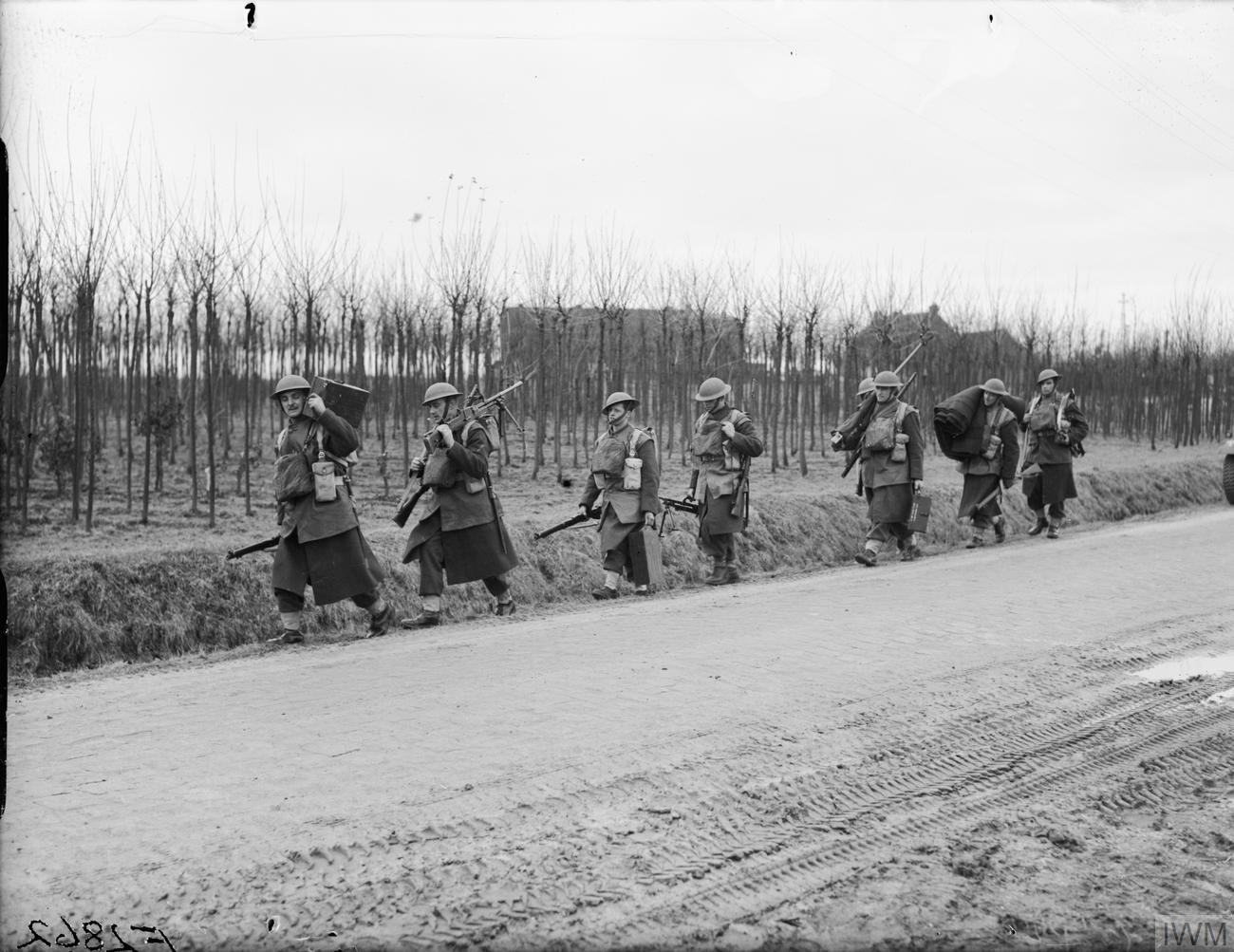
Men from the 1st Battalion, Border Regiment at Rumegies, France 29 February 1940.

The 1st Battalion, Border Regiment formed part of the British Expeditionary Force (BEF) in Europe from 1939 to 1940, under the command of Lieutenant Colonel Robert Horton Farrar. Originally part of the 4th Infantry Brigade of the 2nd Infantry Division, it was exchanged with the 1/8th Battalion, Lancashire Fusiliers and became part of the 125th Infantry Brigade of the 42nd (East Lancashire) Infantry Division. Following the Battle of France, it was evacuated from Dunkirk. After returning to the United Kingdom, the battalion, now under Lieutenant Colonel Roger Bower, was transferred to the mountain warfare trained 31st Independent Infantry Brigade. In October 1941, the brigade was selected to be converted to glider infantry, part of the British Army's newly-formed airborne forces, and became the 1st Glider Brigade, part of the 1st Airborne Division. In this role, the battalion went to North Africa in May 1943 and in July it took part in Operation Ladbroke, part of the Allied invasion of Sicily, in which the battalion suffered heavy casualties, with some gliders being cast off too early due to inexperienced pilots and, as a result, many men were drowned. The battalion, which had gone to Sicily with a strength of 796 officers and men, returned to North Africa with just 200. Due to the heavy casualties, the battalion, now commanded by Lieutenant Colonel Thomas Haddon in succession to Lieutenant Colonel G. C. Britten, did not participate in the Allied invasion of Italy and was sent to the United Kingdom towards the end of 1943. Not seeing action in Operation Overlord, in September 1944, the battalion, together with the rest of the 1st Airborne Division, fought in Operation Market Garden, a failed opening of an attempt to liberate the Netherlands and invade Germany before the end of 1944. The 1st Airborne Division was all but destroyed. The battalion suffered severe casualties and, for this reason, did not see active service for the rest of the war.

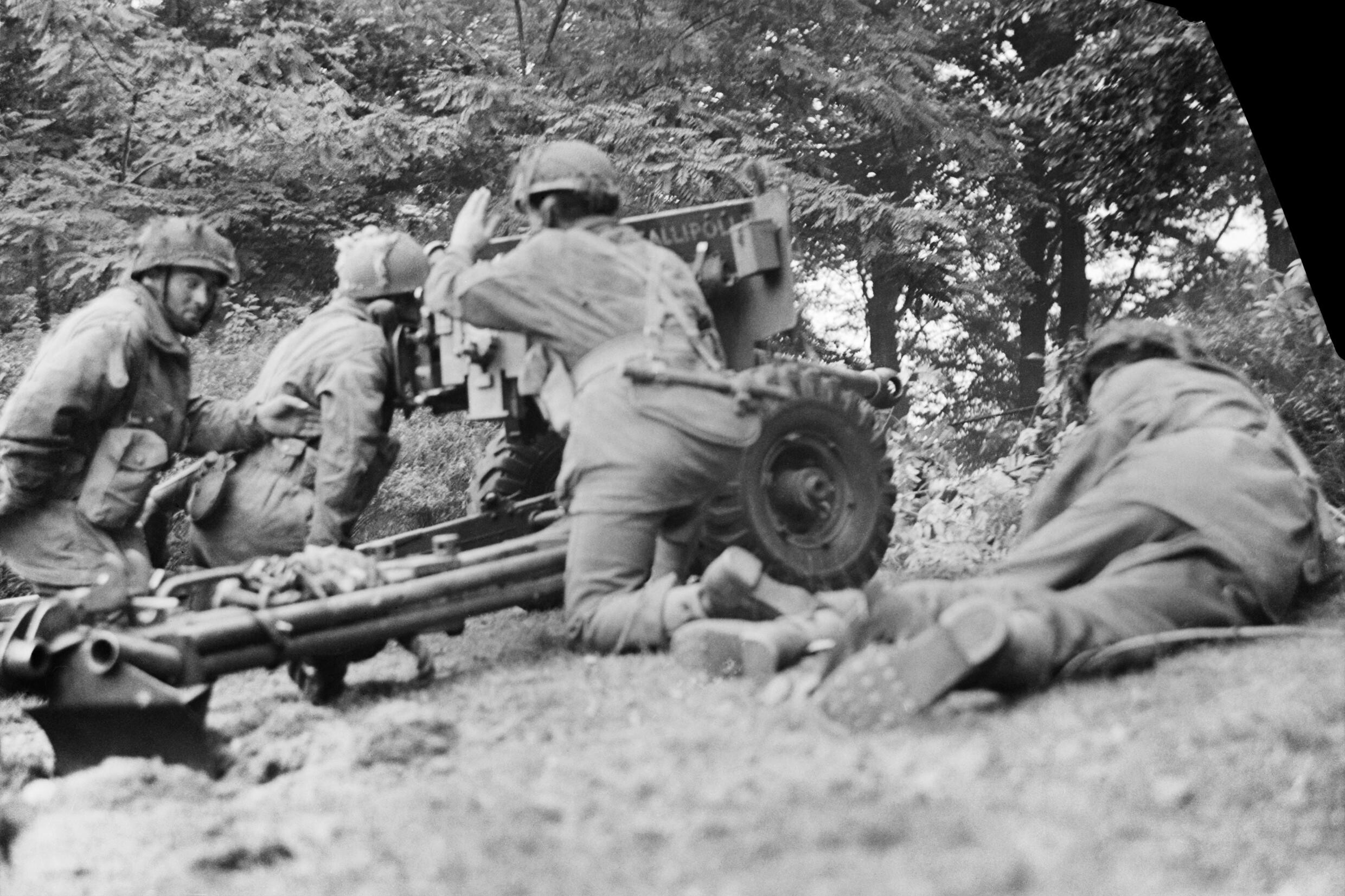
A 6-pdr anti-tank gun of No. 26 Anti-Tank Platoon, 1st Battalion, Border Regiment, during the Battle of Arnhem, 20 September 1944. The gun was at this moment engaging a German PzKpfw B2 (f) tank, and successfully knocked it out.

The 2nd Battalion was serving in British India on the outbreak of war. In 1942, it moved to Ceylon and later took part in the Burma Campaign from 1944 onward with the 100th Indian Infantry Brigade, part of 20th Indian Infantry Division. In April 1945, the battalion was transferred to the 36th British Infantry Division, which was previously an Indian Army formation, and became a Reconnaissance Regiment for the division.

==== Territorial Army ====
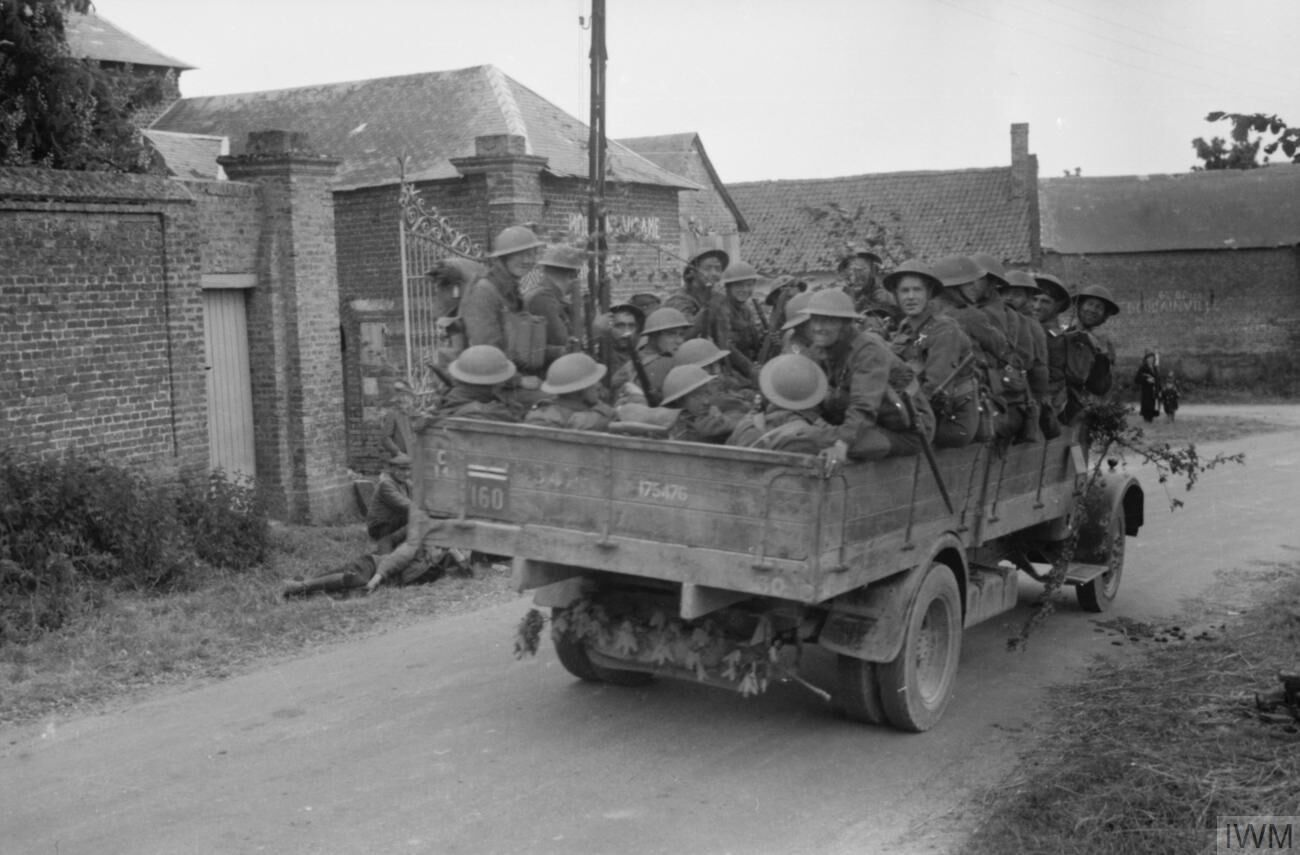
Men of the 4th Battalion, Border Regiment travel in the back of a lorry, France, May 1940.

The 4th Battalion was a 1st Line Territorial Army unit, originally assigned to the 126th Infantry Brigade, 42nd (East Lancashire) Infantry Division. However, the battalion left the brigade in November 1939, and was assigned to the newly raised 25th Infantry Brigade and served from 1939–40 in France on lines of communication duties before becoming part of the ill-fated "2nd BEF" that tried to maintain a presence in France after Dunkirk, finally leaving from the Cherbourg peninsular. After returning to the United Kingdom, it spent time in South Wales on Guard duties before being posted to North Africa in 1941. The battalion was then assigned to the 23rd Infantry Brigade, part of the 70th Infantry Division. Whilst in Africa, it spent some time fighting the Africa Korps, including taking part in the relief of Tobruk before being posted to British India in 1942–1943. In 1944, the entire division was broken up to become part of Brigadier Orde Wingate's 'Special Force' (the Chindits) and took part in the 2nd Chindit expedition in Burma, before finally returning to the United Kingdom in 1945.

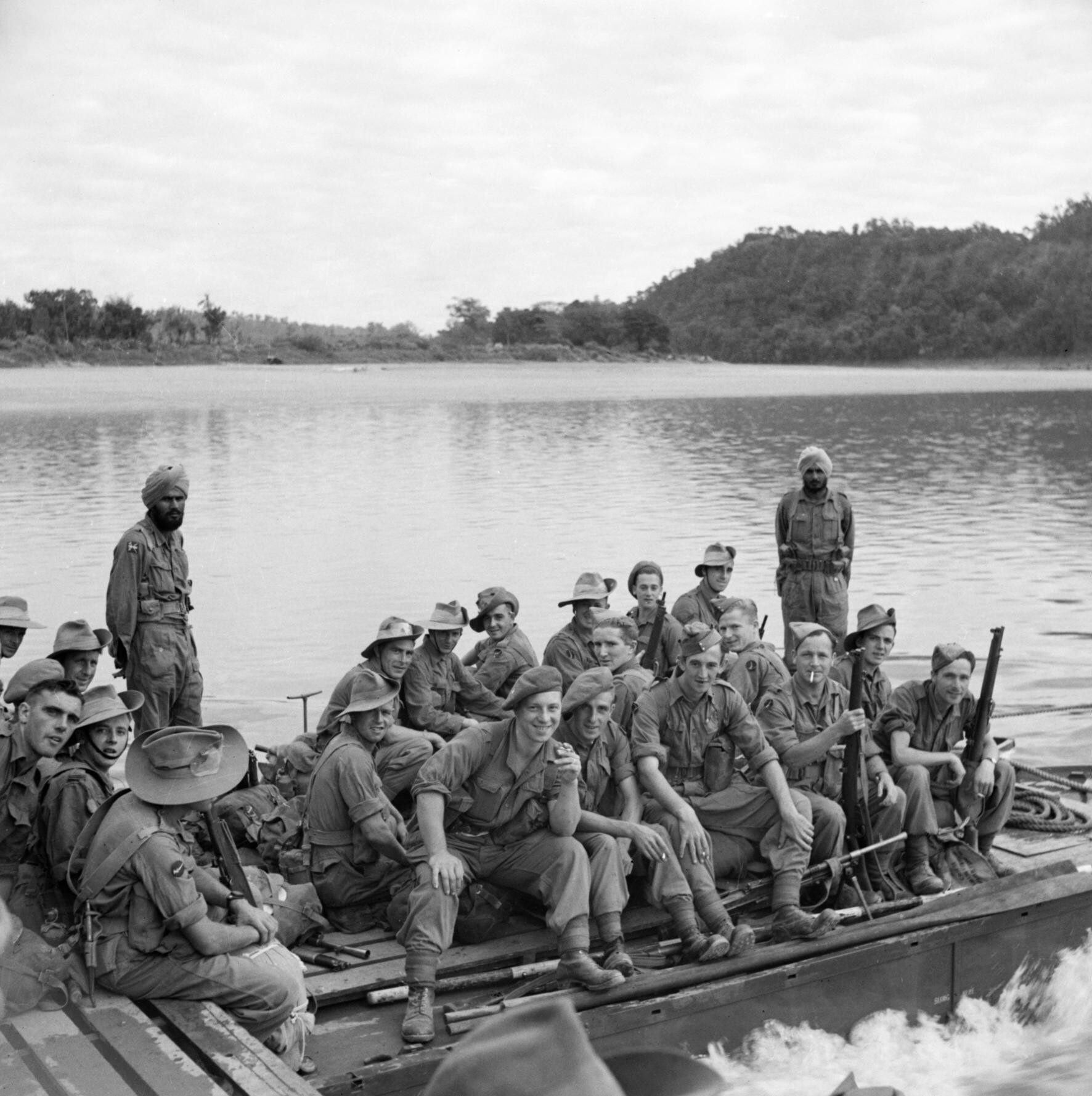
Men of the 9th Battalion, Border Regiment on a ferry ready to cross the Chindwin River, between Kalewa and Shwegying, Burma, January 1945.

The 5th Battalion was also a 1st-Line Territorial Army unit that was serving with the 42nd East Lancashire Infantry Division and was sent to join the BEF in France in 1940. Like the 1st and 4th battalions, it was also evacuated at Dunkirk. After returning to the United Kingdom, it served as home defence in the anticipation of a German invasion. In 1941, it was decided to convert the 42nd Division into an armoured division due to a shortage of armoured troops and the division became the 42nd Armoured Division. The 5th Battalion was converted to armour as the 110th Regiment Royal Armoured Corps. The men continued to wear their Border Regiment cap badge on the black beret of the RAC, as did all infantry units converted in the same way. 110 RAC was disbanded in 1943, and 5th Battalion, Border Regiment was reconstituted in April 1944 by redesignation of the 7th Battalion, a reserve battalion serving in 213th Infantry Brigade, originally created in 1939 as a 2nd Line duplicate of the 5th It spent the rest of the war as a training battalion, assigned to the 45th Infantry Brigade, which was initially part of the 80th Infantry (Reserve) Division and then the 38th Infantry (Reserve) Division.

==== Hostilities-only ====
The 50th (Holding) Battalion was raised in June 1940. In October, it was redesignated as the 9th Battalion and was assigned to the 225th Independent Infantry Brigade (Home). The author George MacDonald Fraser served with the 9th Battalion in Burma; this forms the subject of his memoir Quartered Safe Out Here (1993).

=== Post-war and amalgamation ===
In 1945, the 1st Battalion formed part of the force sent to disarm the German occupiers of Norway, moving on to become part of the Allied Occupation Force in Trieste. In 1947, it moved to Somaliland and in 1947 to Palestine, returning to the UK in 1950.

The 2nd Battalion returned to England in 1946.

On 28 October 1950, the two regular battalions were formally amalgamated into a single 1st Battalion. In 1951, the battalion moved to Egypt and in 1955 to Germany, where it remained for the rest of its existence.

In July 1957, the Defence White Paper outlined a substantial reduction in the size of the British Army, with a number of regiments being amalgamated. The Border Regiment was amalgamated with the King's Own Royal Regiment (Lancaster) to form the King's Own Royal Border Regiment on 1 October 1959.

== Regimental museum ==
The Border Regiment and its successors have a gallery at Cumbria's Museum of Military Life in Alma Block, Carlisle Castle.

== Battle honours ==
The regiment's battle honours were as follows:

- Early Wars
  - Havannah, St. Lucia 1778, Albuhera, Arroyo dos Molinos, Vittoria, Pyrenees, Nivelle, Nive, Orthes, Peninsula, Alma, Inkerman, Sevastopol, Lucknow, Relief of Ladysmith, South Africa 1899–1902, Afghanistan 1919
- First World War
  - Ypres 1914, '15, '17, '18, Langemark 1914, '17, Somme 1916 '18, Arras 1917 '18, Cambrai 1917, '18, Lys, France and Flanders 1914–18, Vittorio Veneto 1918, Macedonia 1915-18, Gallipoli 1915-16
- Second World War
  - Dunkirk 1940, Arnhem 1944, North West Europe 1940 '44, Tobruk 1941, Landing in Sicily, Imphal, Myinmu Bridgehead, Meiktila, Chindits 1944, Burma 1943–5

== Regimental Colonels ==
Regimental Colonels were:

- 1881–1889: (1st Bn.) Gen. Alexander Maxwell, CB
- 1881–1903: (2nd Bn.) Gen. Sir Henry Charles Barnston Daubeney, GCB
- 1889–1897: (1st Bn.) Gen. Sir Richard Denis Kelly, KCB
- 1903–1909: Lieut-Gen. Sir Robert Hume, GCB
- 1909–1919: Maj-Gen. William John Chads, CB
- 1915–1923: Gen. Sir Bruce Meade Hamilton, GCB, KCVO
- 1923–1936: Maj-Gen. Ewen George Sinclair-MacLagan, CB, CMG, DS
- 1936–1947: Brig-Gen. George Hyde Harrison, DSO
- 1947–1952: Maj-Gen. Philip James Shears, CB
- 1952–1959: Maj-Gen. Valentine Blomfield, CB, DSO

*1959 Regiment amalgamated with the King's Own Royal Regiment (Lancaster) to form the King's Own Royal Border Regiment
