= Edward John Mott =

- Born: 4 July 1893; Drayton, Vale of White Horse, Berkshire, England
- Died: October 1967 (aged 74); Witney, Oxfordshire, England
- Military career
- Allegiance: United Kingdom
- Branch: British Army
- Rank: Sergeant
- Service number: 9887
- Units: Border Regiment
- Conflicts: World War I
- Awards: Victoria Cross; Distinguished Conduct Medal

Sergeant Edward John Mott VC DCM (4 July 1893 – 20 October 1967) was an English recipient of the Victoria Cross, the highest and most prestigious award for gallantry in the face of the enemy that can be awarded to British and Commonwealth forces.

Born in Drayton he enlisted in The Border Regiment in 1910, and in 1915, took part in the ill-fated Dardanelles Expedition, after which he served in Egypt and then on the Western Front.

He was 23 years old and a Sergeant in the 1st Battalion, The Border Regiment, British Army when he was awarded the VC.

On 27 January 1917 south of Le Transloy, France, an attack by Sergeant Mott's company was held up at a strong-point by machine-gun fire. Although severely wounded in the eye, Sergeant Mott made a rush for the gun and after a fierce struggle seized the gunner and took him prisoner, capturing the gun. It was due to the dash and initiative of this NCO that the left flank attack succeeded.

== The Medal ==
His Victoria Cross is displayed in the Fitzwilliam Museum in Cambridge.

== Bibliography ==
- Gliddon, Gerald (2012) [1998]. Arras and Messines 1917. VCs of the First World War. Stroud, Gloucestershire: The History Press. ISBN 978-0-7524-6604-0.
