= Rebecca Jones (Quaker) =

1739–1818 , Quaker minister

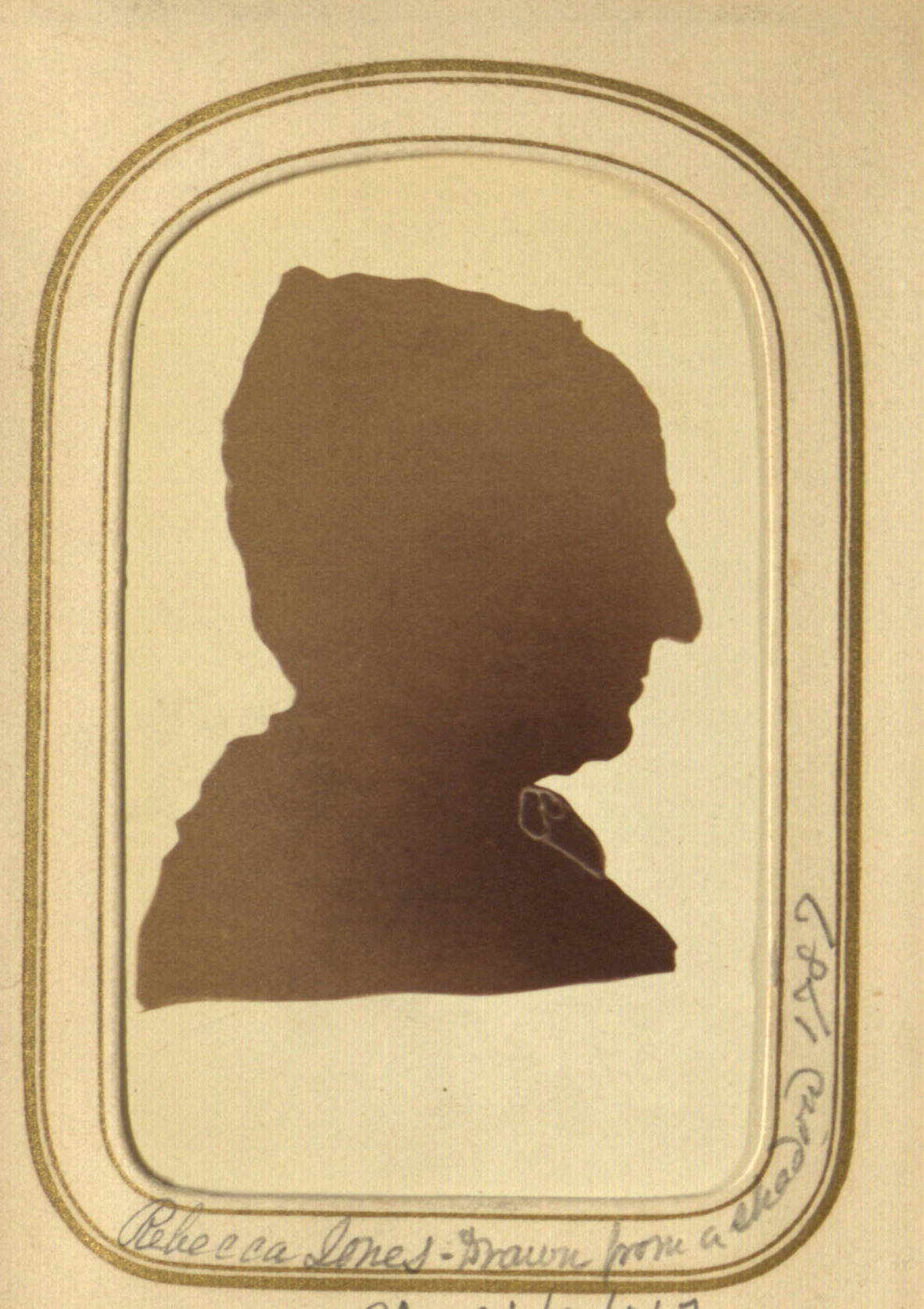
- Born: July 8, 1739; Philadelphia
- Died: April 15, 1818 (aged 78)
- Occupation: Quaker minister
- Years active: 1758-1813

Rebecca Jones (July 8, 1739 - April 15, 1818) was a Quaker minister and educator. She is known for having helped maintain the tradition of female preaching and leadership among American Quakers, and helping create it in Britain.

== Early life ==
Jones was born July 8, 1739, in Philadelphia, to William Jones, a seaman, and Mary Porter, a school mistress. Shortly after her birth, William died on a voyage. Mary Jones supported Rebecca and her older brother, Daniel, by running a school for young girls at No. 8 Drinker's Alley. As a child, she was referred to as "Romping Becky."

Although Jones was raised in the Anglican tradition, she showed an interest in the Quaker faith from twelve years old. At sixteen years of age, Jones began the conversion process after hearing minister Catherine Peyton preach. Despite ridicule and objection from family and friends, Jones became increasingly involved in the Quaker religion, becoming a regular speaker by 1758. Two years later, she became a minister.

== Professional Life and Ministry ==
Jones took over the school in 1761, when Mary Jones became ill. After Mary's death, another Quaker minister, Hannah Cathrall, joined the school as a teacher. They taught girls and boys. By 1764, their Quaker students' tuitions were subsidized by the William Penn Charter School. Jones taught while travelling to preach through the 1760s and 1770s.

In 1783, Jones closed the school and applied for a certificate as a traveling minister. At the London Yearly Meeting, Jones and her colleagues successfully advocated for English Quaker women to gain the right to hold a women's yearly meeting. Between 1784 and 1788, Jones continued to travel England, Ireland, Scotland, and Wales, with English Quaker Christina Hustler. She visited many English schools, including Ackworth School.

In 1788, Jones returned to Philadelphia, where she opened a small shop where she sold material, thread, and other sundries. Jones continued to preach in the Delaware Valley and New England, and regularly visited District families. In 1799, she helped establish the Westtown Friends' Boarding School.

== Personal life ==
Jones never married, but had particularly close relationships with Quaker women on both sides of the Atlantic. Notably, Bernice Chattin became Jones's adopted daughter. Chattin lived with Jones beginning in the 1790s, and cared for her household while Jones traveled.

== Illness and death ==
Jones fell ill Yellow Fever Epidemic of 1793. In 1813, she contracted Typhus, which she never fully recovered from. While this ended her traveling career, she was consulted for her expertise. She remained an invalid until her death in 1818.

== Legacy ==
Jones's life has been memorialized multiple times since her death. These include Memorials of Rebecca Jones, published by H. Longstreth around 1849, and The Life and Letters of Rebecca Jones, published by Friends Library Friends Library Publishing and updated in 2022.
