= Whitehaven =

Town in Cumbria, England

Coordinates: 54.5480°N 3.5855°W

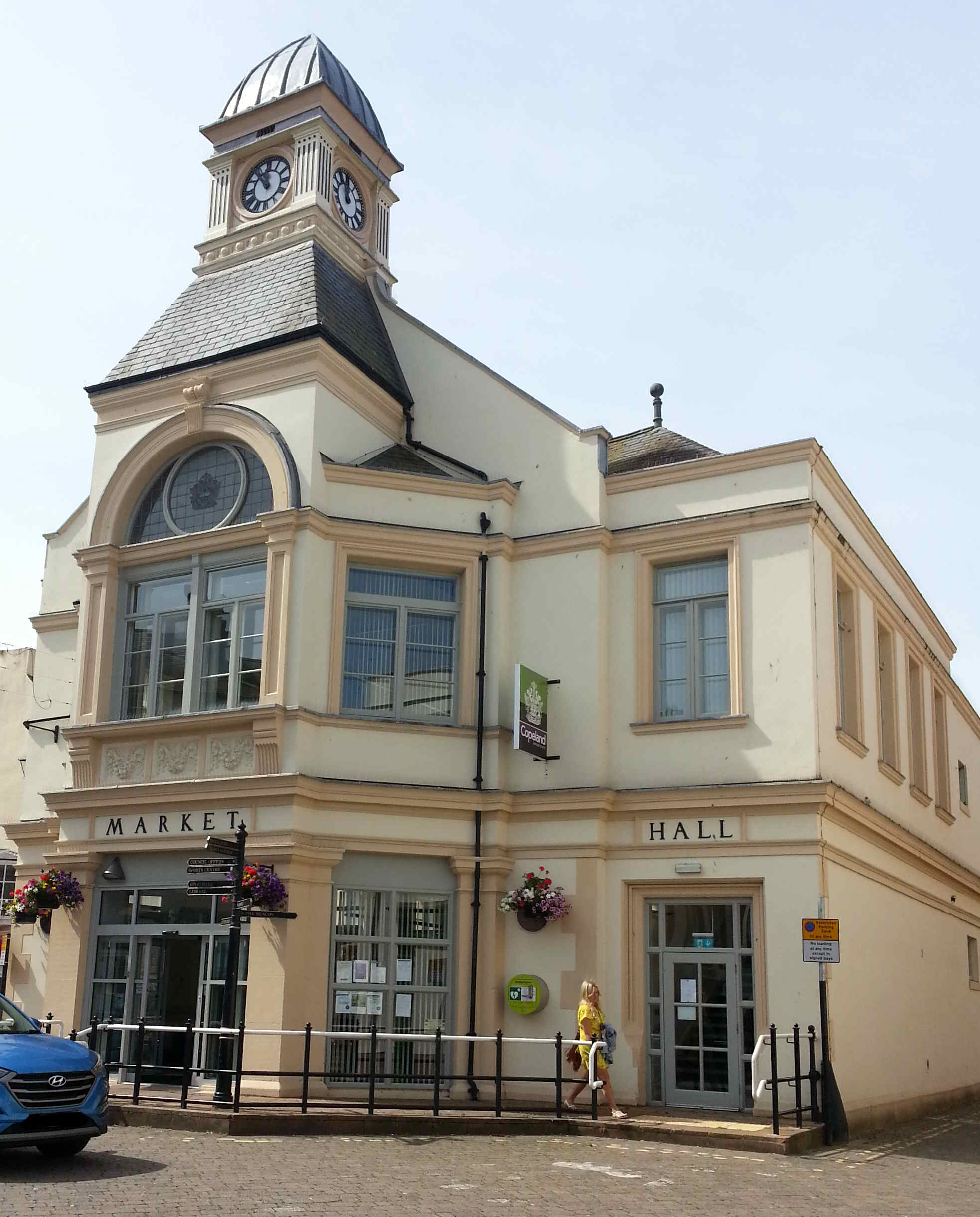
- Whitehaven Market Hall

- Location within Cumbria
- Population: 24,040 (Parish, 2021); 22,945 (Built up area, 2021)
- OS grid reference: NX974181
- Civil parish: Whitehaven
- Unitary authority: Cumberland
- Ceremonial county: Cumbria
- Region: North West
- Country: England
- Sovereign state: United Kingdom
- Post town: WHITEHAVEN
- Postcode district: CA28
- Dialling code: 01946
- Police: Cumbria
- Fire: Cumbria
- Ambulance: North West
- UK Parliament: Whitehaven and Workington

Whitehaven is a town and civil parish in the Cumberland district of Cumbria, England. It is a port on the north-west coast, and lies 4 miles (6 km) outside the Lake District National Park. It is 35 miles (56 km) south-west of Carlisle. The parish also includes the small village of Sandwith. At the 2021 census the parish had a population of 24,040 and the Whitehaven built up area had a population of 22,945.

The town's growth was largely due to the exploitation of the extensive coal measures by the Lowther family, driving a growing export of coal through the harbour from the 17th century onwards. It was also a major port for trading with the American colonies, and was, after London, the second busiest port of England by tonnage from 1750 to 1772. This prosperity led to the creation of a Georgian planned town in the 18th century which has left an architectural legacy of over 170 listed buildings.

Whitehaven was the site of a major chemical industry after World War II, but both that and the coal industry have disappeared, and today the major industry is the nearby Sellafield nuclear complex, which is the largest local employer of labour and has a significant administrative base in the town. Whitehaven includes a number of former villages, estates and suburbs, such as Mirehouse, Woodhouse, Kells and Hensingham, and is served by the Cumbrian Coast railway line and the A595 road.

== History ==
Although there was a Roman fort at Parton, around 1.2 miles (1.9 km) to the north, there is no evidence of a Roman settlement on the site of the present town of Whitehaven.

The area was settled by Irish-Norse Vikings in the 10th century. The area name of Copeland, which includes Whitehaven, indicates that the land was purchased from the Kingdom of Strathclyde, possibly with loot from Ireland.

Following the arrival of the Normans, in about 1120 St Bees Priory was founded by William de Meschin, which was granted a large tract of land from the coast at Whitehaven to the river Keekle, and then south down the River Ehen to the sea. This included the small fishing village of Whitehaven. Following Henry VIII's dissolution of the priory in 1539, ownership of this estate passed through a number of secular landlords until it passed into the hands of the Lowther family in the 17th century.

Whitehaven was historically a township within the parish of St Bees. The town's three Anglican churches of Holy Trinity, St Nicholas, and St James were chapels-of-ease to the parish church at St Bees until 1835 when each was given an ecclesiastical parish.

=== Growth and prosperity ===
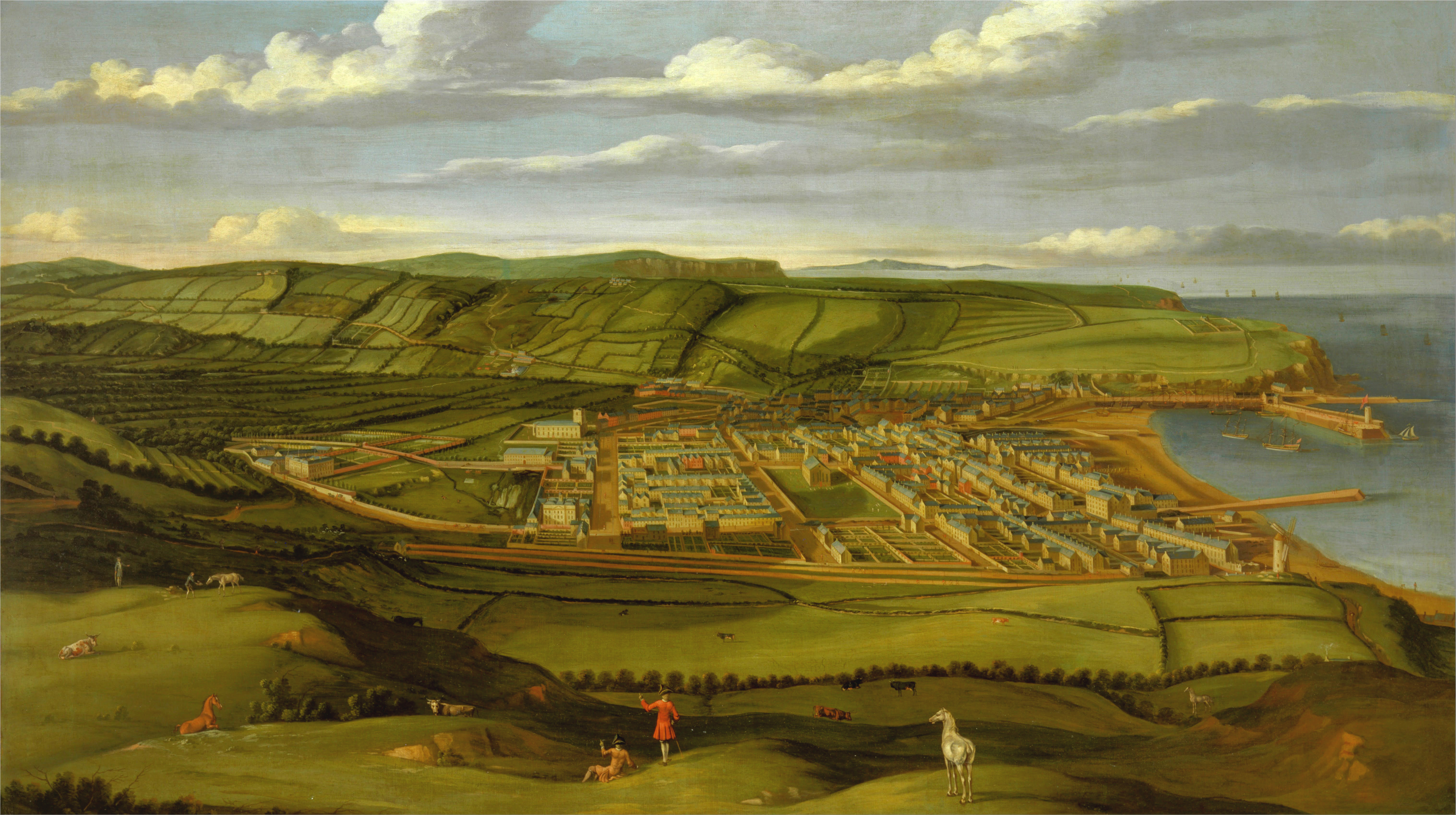
Matthias Read's view of Whitehaven, circa 1738, showing the planned town of Sir John Lowther.

The modern growth of Whitehaven started with the purchase by Sir Christopher Lowther of the Whitehaven estate in 1630 and the subsequent development of the port and the mines. In 1634 he built a stone pier providing shelter and access for shipping, enabling the export of coal from the Cumberland Coalfield, particularly to Ireland. This was a key event in the rapid growth of the town from a small fishing village to an industrial port.

In 1642 the manor of St Bees was inherited by Sir John Lowther, 2nd Baronet, of Whitehaven (1642–1706), who developed the town of Whitehaven, its coal industry and the trade with Ireland. He oversaw the rise of Whitehaven from a small fishing village (at his birth consisting of some fifty houses and a population of about 250) to a planned town three times the size of Carlisle. At his death the 'port of Whitehaven' had 77 registered vessels, totalling about four thousand tons, and was exporting more than 35,000 tons of coal a year.

Whitehaven's growing prosperity was also based on tobacco. By 1685 there were ships regularly bringing tobacco from the British colonies of Virginia, Maryland and Pennsylvania in America, and by the early 18th century about 10% of England's tobacco imports passed through Whitehaven. By the middle of the 18th century, it was the second or third port in England for tobacco imports. The tobacco was then sold on the domestic market or re-exported, e.g. to Ireland, France and the Netherlands.

However, after the Acts of Union 1707 united England with Scotland, thereby abolishing excise duties between them, the port of Glasgow began to take over Whitehaven's tobacco trade, leading to the later creation of Glasgow's Tobacco Lords. By the second half of the 18th century, there was a marked decline in shipping of tobacco via Whitehaven, and by 1820 the Customs Collector did not mention tobacco in his report on Whitehaven.

Daniel Defoe visited Whitehaven in the 1720s and wrote that the town had

grown up from a small place to be very considerable by the coal trade, that it is now the most eminent port in England for shipping off of coals, except Newcastle and Sunderland and even beyond the last. They have of late fallen into some merchandising also, occasioned by the strange great number of their shipping, and there are now some considerable merchants; but the town is yet but young in trade.

Whitehaven was involved with the transatlantic slave trade, and records show 64 known slaving voyages to Africa originating in Whitehaven between 1711 and 1768. That is about 0.5 per cent of all British slaving trips. Whitehaven was not a good base for ships in the slave trade as there was a limited supply of trade goods to be obtained from the port or its hinterland. The trade eventually moved to other ports where there were local industries that could supply the goods that were exchanged for those people bought in Africa. The only advantage Whitehaven had was during wartime, when ships setting out or returning were less likely to be intercepted by enemy privateers. In 2006, the Copeland Council (Whitehaven's local authority) issued a formal apology for Whitehaven's role in the slave trade.

Scottish-American naval officer John Paul Jones raided the town in 1778 during the American Revolutionary War, burning some merchant ships in the harbour.

The population in the 1841 census was 15,841 inhabitants.

During the 19th century the port of Whitehaven was overtaken by Bristol, Liverpool and Glasgow, as they had deep-water dock facilities and were closer to large centres of population and industry. The huge development of a national railway network had also reduced Whitehaven's 18th century competitive advantage of having coal extracted very close to a harbour for shipment by sea.

An 1888 legal case, Bush v Whitehaven Port and Town Trustees, was one of a series of legal cases involved in the development of the doctrine of frustration of contract in English law. Bush, the contractor in this case, had contracted to construct a water-main for a "slump sum" [sic]. His tender was submitted in June, and he was "given to understand" that he could begin the work at once, but part of the land was not available until October. This meant the work took place during the winter, when operations are more difficult and more costly. The jury in this case decided that the timing issue substantially affected the contract, and awarded damages to be paid to the contractor.

== Coal mining ==
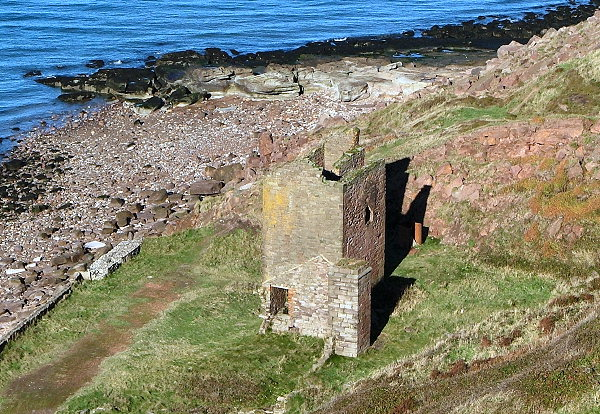
Saltom Pit 1729–1848, pioneer of undersea mining.

=== Early mining ===
The earliest reference to coal mining in the Whitehaven area is in the time of Prior Langton (1256–1282) of St Bees Priory, concerning the coal mines at Arrowthwaite. St Bees Priory was dissolved in 1539, and the lands and mineral rights passed to secular owners. The first of these, Sir Thomas Chaloner, granted leases of land in 1560 for digging coal, and in 1586 he granted St Bees School liberty "to take 40 loads of coal at his coal pits in the parish of St Bees for the use of the school". Such workings were small-scale and near the surface, using adits and bell pits. But the Lowther family later developed and dominated the coal industry in Whitehaven from the mid-17th century to the early 20th century.

=== The influence of the Lowthers ===
Sir John Lowther, 2nd Baronet (1642–1706) significantly developed the coal industry and the trade with Ireland. He spent over £11,000 in expanding the Lowther holdings in the area, and considerably improved the drainage of his pits; thus allowing mining at greater depths.

Sir James Lowther, 4th Baronet FRS (1673–1755) continued the work of his father and reputedly became the richest commoner in England. Between 1709 and 1754, over £46,000 was spent to extend the Lowther holdings of land and coal royalties in West Cumberland. (Note: Total is given by Wood; purchases (and price paid) are listed in appendices of) By the 1740s Lowther was the dominant supplier of coal exported from every harbour in the Cumberland coalfield and from the late 17th to the mid-19th centuries this coal represented 6%-7% of all English exports to Ireland; most of the coal burnt in Dublin came from here. However, Lowther was noted for his unscrupulous business practices, and a lease of the coal royalties owned by St Bees School was obtained in 1742 on manifestly unfair terms: an annual rent of £3.50, with no payment per ton raised, for 867 years. The lease was eventually quashed in 1827, with compensation of over £13,000 paid to the school.

=== Mining under the sea ===
Sir John, and after him Sir James, had concerns that there were few reserves of economically retrievable coal under dry land. They felt that exploration under the sea was necessary, but this carried the risk of flooding. However, Sir James had two very able managers, the brothers Carlisle and John Spedding, who were willing to explore new technology and techniques. In 1712 John Spedding urged Lowther to consider pumping by steam, and in 1715 he became one of the earliest customers for the newly invented Newcomen engine. Spedding concluded that such an engine would drain a flooded pit in two-thirds the time that horse gins would take, and would do so at a quarter of the cost. Consequently, a small (17-inch diameter cylinder) Engine No. 5, built by Thomas Newcomen and John Calley, was erected. It was so successful that in 1727 Lowther bought an additional pumping engine.

With this proven method of pumping Lowther was able to exploit the coal measures under the sea by sinking a pit at Saltom on land below the cliffs south of the harbour, to a depth of 456 ft (138m). Work began early in 1730, (Note: New Style; but (since this is before 1752) Lady Day Quarter of 1729 according to John Spedding's accounts.) and the pit was officially opened in May 1732 with great celebration. Carlisle Spedding had charge of the design and construction, and successfully sank only the second sub-sea pit in Britain. It was reported that "A shaft twelve foot by ten had been sunk seventy-seven fathoms" (141 metres) "(the deepest a pit had been sunk in any part of Europe) to a three-yard thick coal seam (the Main Band) in twenty-three months, using thirty barrels of gunpowder, and without any loss of life or limb by the workforce'. Saltom Pit ceased working coal in 1848, and is now a Scheduled Ancient Monument (SM 27801) and is the best known surviving example of an 18th-century colliery layout. Evidence of the shaft, horse gin, stable, winding engine house, boiler house and chimney, cottages, cart roads and retaining walls, all survives. Coal excavated from Saltom Pit was raised by horse gin to the surface, then transported by tramway through a tunnel to Ravenhill Pit for lifting to the cliff top. Saltom Pit was used as a central pumping station, draining many of the other local mines via a drift driven in the 1790s, and continued in use long after it had ceased to work coal.

=== Technical innovation ===
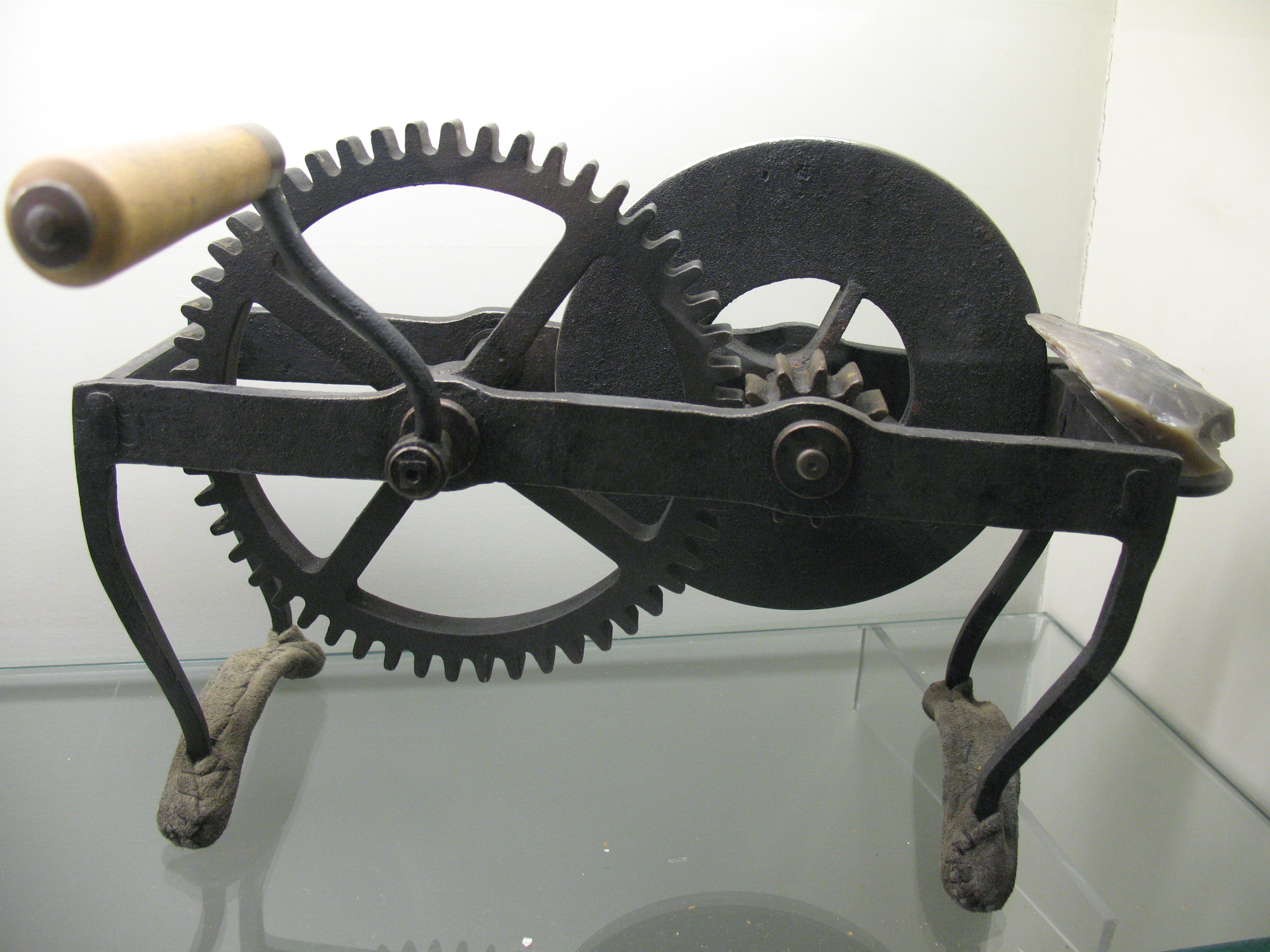
Carlisle Spedding's "steel mill"

To counter the considerable danger of methane gas explosion, Carlisle Spedding invented a forerunner to the Davy Lamp, known as the Spedding Wheel or Steel Mill. This used the sparks generated by a flint against a rotating steel wheel to provide light, on the basis the sparks were not quite hot enough to ignite the gas. On occasions it caused explosions or fires but it was a major improvement over the naked flame. Lowther also supported experimental work on firedamp by William Brownrigg, a local doctor and scientist, and he presented papers by Brownrigg at the Royal Society. Brownrigg had gas piped from a nearby pit to his workshop, which provided light and heat, and bladders of the gas were taken to London to be demonstrated at the Royal Society. Brownrigg was elected a Fellow of the Royal Society (FRS) for this work.

=== The decline of Lowther influence ===
After Sir James, there was a succession of Lowthers who inherited the coal interests but did not emulate his close interest. The Lowthers' direct involvement in coal diminished, and in 1888 the mines were leased to the Whitehaven Colliery Company. By 1893 nearly all the coal was being extracted from under the sea, and William pit extended 4 miles out under the Solway. In 1900 the output of the collieries was 536,000 tons. However they became less economic; the company failed in 1933, and the pits were sold to Priestman collieries. They in turn failed in 1935, and the pits were closed for 18 months. Work resumed with help from a Nuffield foundation, and the Cumberland Coal Company was formed, re-opening the pits in 1937. In 1947 the pits came under the nationalised body, the National Coal Board.

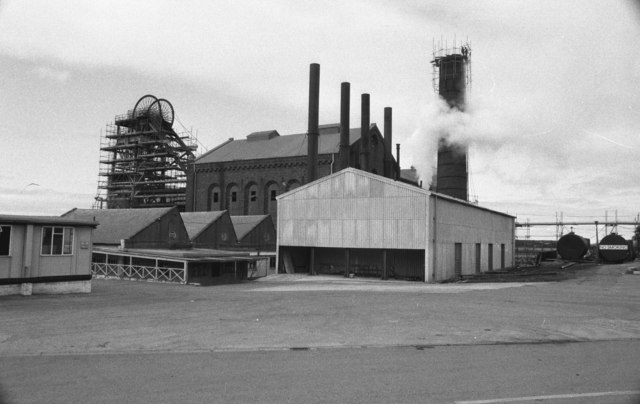
Haig Pit (closed 1986), the last pit in Whitehaven

=== Extent of mining ===
In 300 years over seventy pits were sunk in the Whitehaven area. During this period some five hundred or more people were killed in pit disasters and mining accidents. The largest disaster in the area was in 1910 at Wellington Pit, where 136 miners died. In another disaster in 1947 at William Pit, 104 men were killed. Four separate explosions over the period 1922–1931 at Haig Pit together killed 83. Haig was the last pit to operate in Whitehaven.

=== Temporary end of coal mining ===
Saltom Pit after conservation work

In 1983, a major geological fault was encountered at Haig pit which increased the difficulty of operation. This, combined with the political situation, and the miners' strike in 1984–85, contributed to problems at the colliery. The workforce attempted to open a new face, but a decision had been taken to close, and after two years of recovery work, Haig finally ceased mining on 31 March 1986. Today there is no mining carried out in Whitehaven though there is a proposal to sink a new mine out under the sea for coking coal. In November 2019 the UK government gave the green light for this mine to go ahead.

=== Preservation of Saltom pit ===
In 2007, Copeland Council declared that it could no longer afford to maintain the remaining Saltom Pit buildings, and preserve them from damage by the sea. But after an online campaign by myWhitehaven.net, the council changed their mind. They teamed up with the National Trust to try to save Saltom Pit, and obtained the necessary funding from various sources, including a 50% grant from the European Union. On Monday 8 December 2007, Saltom Pit was reopened as an historic monument. The pit buildings have been conserved and are now part of the 'Whitehaven Coast' project, a scheme to regenerate the coastal area of Whitehaven.

== Climate ==
Climate data for St Bees Head (1991–2020)
Month	Jan	Feb	Mar	Apr	May	Jun	Jul	Aug	Sep	Oct	Nov	Dec	Year
Mean daily maximum °C (°F)	6.3 (43.3)	6.5 (43.7)	8.2 (46.8)	10.7 (51.3)	13.9 (57.0)	16.1 (61.0)	17.7 (63.9)	17.6 (63.7)	15.8 (60.4)	12.7 (54.9)	9.4 (48.9)	7.1 (44.8)	11.8 (53.2)
Mean daily minimum °C (°F)	2.5 (36.5)	2.4 (36.3)	3.3 (37.9)	5.1 (41.2)	7.5 (45.5)	10.2 (50.4)	12.2 (54.0)	12.4 (54.3)	10.7 (51.3)	8.0 (46.4)	5.3 (41.5)	3.1 (37.6)	6.9 (44.4)
Average rainfall mm (inches)	98.2 (3.87)	81.1 (3.19)	76.6 (3.02)	60.1 (2.37)	65.6 (2.58)	74.9 (2.95)	84.9 (3.34)	99.8 (3.93)	98.0 (3.86)	132.3 (5.21)	123.9 (4.88)	114.0 (4.49)	1,109.4 (43.68)
Average rainy days (≥ 1 mm)	15.4	13.3	13.1	11.1	10.7	10.9	12.5	13.3	13.2	15.5	16.8	16.2	162.0
Source: Met Office

== Governance ==
There are two tiers of local government covering Whitehaven, at parish (town) and unitary authority level: Whitehaven Town Council and Cumberland Council. The town council is based at 148 Queen Street. Cumberland Council also has a customer service centre in the town at the Market Hall.

For national elections, Whitehaven forms part of the Whitehaven and Workington constituency, created for the 2024 general election, since when it has been represented by Josh MacAlister of the Labour Party.

=== Administrative history ===
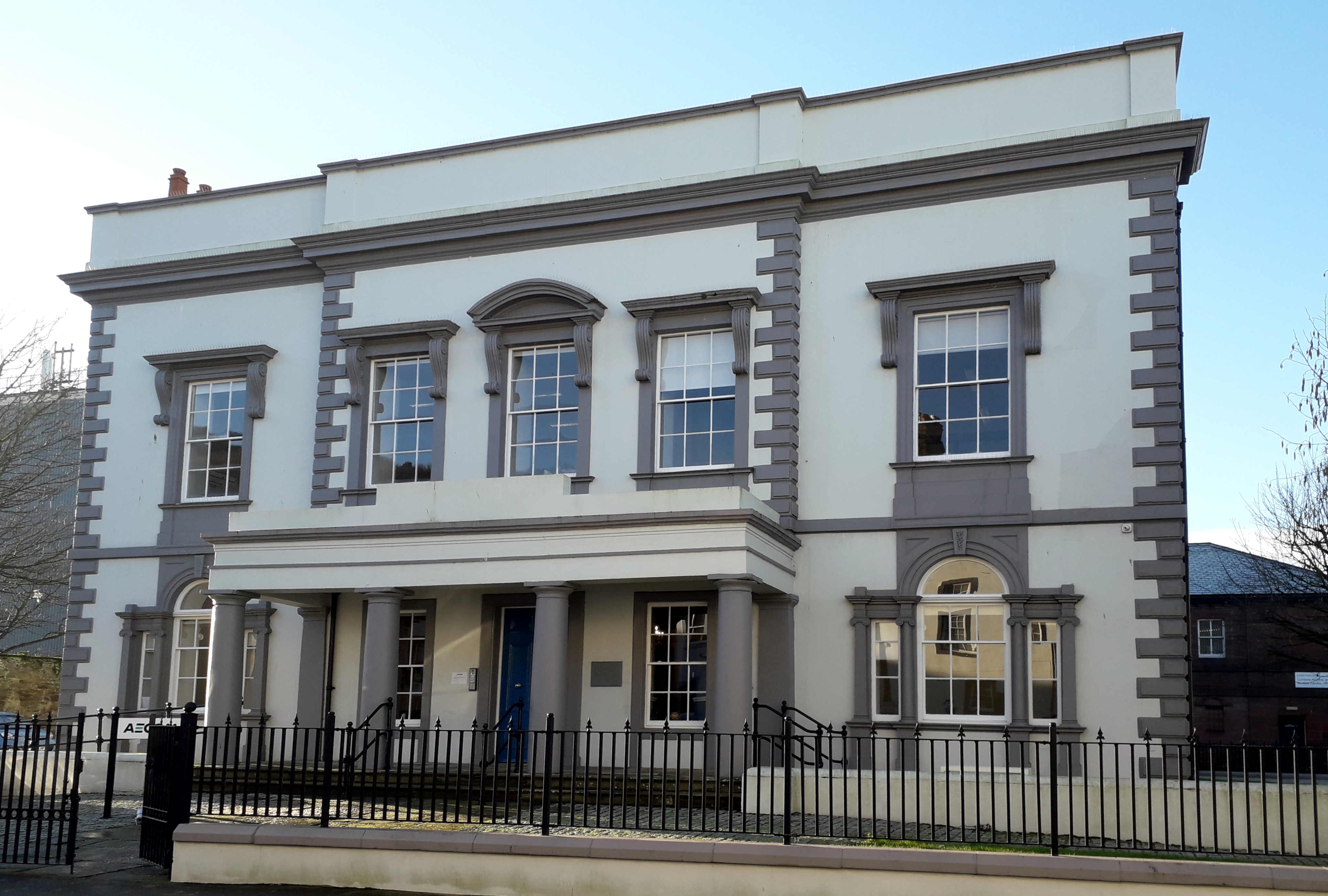
The former Whitehaven Town Hall on Duke Street, built 1710.

Whitehaven was historically a township in the ancient parish of St Bees, within the historic county of Cumberland. In 1709 a body known as the Trustees of the Town and Harbour of Whitehaven was established to administer both the harbour and the town. The trustees were heavily influenced by the Lowther family, who as lords of the manor had the right to appoint several of the trustees directly. In 1851 the trustees bought Cupola House, which had been built in 1710 as a private house for a merchant, and converted it into Whitehaven Town Hall.

In 1832 a Whitehaven constituency was created, covering the Whitehaven township and the northern part of Preston Quarter (another township of St Bees parish). The Whitehaven and Preston Quarter townships both took on civil functions under the poor laws, and so also became civil parishes in 1866 when the legal definition of 'parish' was changed to be the areas used for administering the poor laws.

The trustees' role in administering both the harbour and the town was brought to an end in 1894 when the town was incorporated to become a municipal borough with an elected town council. The area of the new borough matched the constituency. The trustees were thereafter only responsible for the harbour, and became the Whitehaven Harbour Commissioners.

The borough was enlarged in 1934 to take in Hensingham and Sandwith, alongside some adjustments to the borough's boundaries with other neighbouring parishes. The borough of Whitehaven was abolished in 1974 under the Local Government Act 1972. The area became part of the Borough of Copeland in the new county of Cumbria. The area of the pre-1974 borough of Whitehaven was an unparished area from 1974 until 2015, when a new civil parish of Whitehaven was created, with its parish council taking the name Whitehaven Town Council.

Copeland was abolished in 2023 when the new Cumberland Council was created, also taking over the functions of the abolished Cumbria County Council in the area.

== Harbour ==
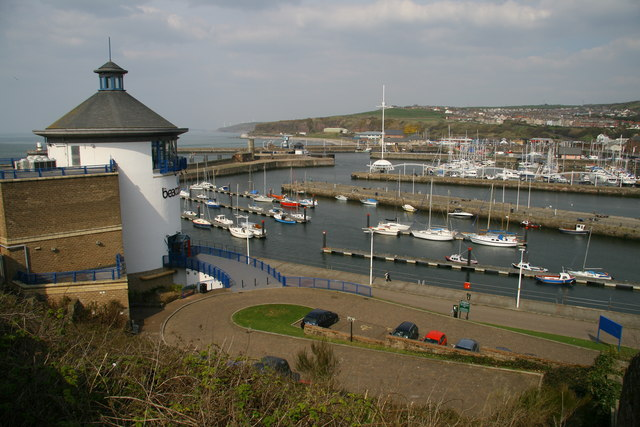
Whitehaven Harbour from Prospect showing Beacon museum at the left

Whitehaven Harbour Act 1708
- Act of Parliament
- Parliament of Great Britain
- Long title: An Act for preserving and enlarging the Harbour of Whitehaven, in the County of Cumberland.
- Citation: 7 Ann. c. 9 (Note: This is the citation in The Statutes of the Realm.); 7 Ann. c. 5 (Note: This is the citation in The Statutes at Large.)
- Territorial extent: Great Britain

Dates
- Royal assent: 23 March 1709
- Commencement: 16 November 1708 (Note: Start of session.)
Other legislation
Amended by	Whitehaven Harbour Act 1711; Whitehaven Harbour Improvement Act 1739; Whitehaven Improvement Act 1816; Whitehaven Waterworks Act 1849
Relates to	Whitehaven Improvement Act 1760; Whitehaven Junction Railway (Alteration and Extension) Act 1848; Whitehaven and Furness Junction Railway Amendment Act 1848; Whitehaven Harbour Act 2007

Status: Amended

Text of statute as originally enacted

Whitehaven Harbour Act 1711
- Act of Parliament
- Parliament of Great Britain
- Long title: An Act for enlarging the Term for Payment of certain Duties, granted in and by an Act of Parliament passed in the Seventh Year of Her Majesty's Reign, intituled, "An Act for preserving and enlarging the Harbour of Whitehaven, in the County of Cumberland."
- Citation: 10 Ann. c. 17; 10 Ann. c. 3 Pr.
- Territorial extent: Great Britain

Dates
- Royal assent: 3 March 1712
- Commencement: 7 December 1711
Other legislation
Amends	Whitehaven Harbour Act 1708
Amended by	Whitehaven Harbour Improvement Act 1739; Whitehaven Improvement Act 1806; Whitehaven Improvement Act 1816; Whitehaven Waterworks Act 1849
Relates to	Whitehaven Improvement Act 1760; Whitehaven Junction Railway (Alteration and Extension) Act 1848; Whitehaven and Furness Junction Railway Amendment Act 1848

Status: Amended

Text of statute as originally enacted

Whitehaven Harbour Improvement Act 1739
- Act of Parliament
- Parliament of Great Britain
- Long title: An Act for making more effectual Two Acts of Parliament, passed in the Seventh and Tenth Years of Her late Majesty Queen Anne, for preserving and enlarging the Harbour of Whitehaven, in the County of Cumberland; and for repairing and amending the High Roads leading to the said Harbour and Town of Whitehaven.
- Citation: 13 Geo. 2. c. 14
- Territorial extent: Great Britain

Dates
- Royal assent: 29 April 1740
- Commencement
Other legislation
Amends	Whitehaven Harbour Act 1708; Whitehaven Harbour Act 1711
Amended by	Whitehaven Improvement Act 1760; Whitehaven Roads Act 1806; Whitehaven Improvement Act 1816; Whitehaven Waterworks Act 1849
Relates to	Whitehaven Junction Railway (Alteration and Extension) Act 1848; Whitehaven and Furness Junction Railway Amendment Act 1848; Whitehaven Waterworks Act 1849

Status: Amended

Text of statute as originally enacted

Whitehaven Improvement Act 1760
- Act of Parliament
- Parliament of Great Britain
- Long title: An Act for continuing so much of an Act, passed in the Thirteenth Year of King George the Second, intituled, "An Act for making more effectual Two Acts of Parliament, passed in the Seventh and Tenth Years of Her late Majesty Queen Anne, for preserving and enlarging the Harbour of Whitehaven in the County of Cumberland, and for repairing and amending the High Roads leading to the said Harbour and Town of Whitehaven," as relates to the preserving and enlarging of the said Harbour.
- Citation: 1 Geo. 3. c. 44
- Territorial extent: Great Britain

Dates
- Royal assent: 19 March 1761
- Commencement: 26 October 1760
Other legislation
Amends	Whitehaven Harbour Improvement Act 1739
Amended by	Whitehaven Improvement Act 1816; Whitehaven Waterworks Act 1849

Status: Amended

Text of statute as originally enacted

Whitehaven Improvement Act 1816
- Act of Parliament
- Parliament of the United Kingdom
- Long title: An Act for altering and enlarging the Powers of several Acts passed for improving the Port, Harbour, and Town of Whitehaven, in the County of Cumberland; and for better supplying the said Town with Water.
- Citation: 56 Geo. 3. c. xliv
- Territorial extent: United Kingdom

Dates
- Royal assent: 31 May 1816
- Commencement: 31 May 1816 (Note: The Acts of Parliament (Commencement) Act 1793.)
Other legislation
Amends	Whitehaven Harbour Act 1708; Whitehaven Harbour Act 1711; Whitehaven Harbour Improvement Act 1739; Whitehaven Improvement Act 1760; Whitehaven (Improvement) Act 1762; Whitehaven Improvement Act 1788; Whitehaven Improvement Act 1792; Whitehaven Improvement Act 1806
Amended by	Whitehaven Harbour and Improvement Act 1818; Whitehaven Harbour Act 1858; Whitehaven Town and Harbour Act 1859; Whitehaven Dock and Railways Act 1871; Whitehaven Town and Harbour Act 1879
Relates to	Whitehaven Junction Railway (Alteration and Extension) Act 1848; Whitehaven and Furness Junction Railway Amendment Act 1848; Whitehaven Waterworks Act 1849

Status: Amended

Text of statute as originally enacted

Whitehaven Harbour Act 1858 (Note: Section 7.)
- Act of Parliament
- Parliament of the United Kingdom
- Long title: An Act to amend the Act, Fifty-sixth King George the Third, Chapter Forty-four, for improving the Port, Harbour, and Town of Whitehaven in the County of Cumberland, in relation to the Securities to be granted for borrowed Money.
- Citation: 21 & 22 Vict. c. ii
- Territorial extent: United Kingdom

Dates
- Royal assent: 11 May 1858
- Commencement: 11 May 1858
Other legislation
Amends	Whitehaven Improvement Act 1816
Relates to	Whitehaven Harbour Act 1708; Whitehaven Harbour Act 1711; Whitehaven Harbour Improvement Act 1739; Whitehaven Improvement Act 1760; Whitehaven Improvement Act 1762; Whitehaven Improvement Act 1788; Whitehaven Improvement Act 1792; Whitehaven Improvement Act 1806; Commissioners Clauses Act 1847

Text of statute as originally enacted

Whitehaven Harbour Act 1937
- Act of Parliament
- Parliament of the United Kingdom
- Long title: An Act to authorise the Whitehaven Harbour Commissioners to make arrangements with their Bondholders, and for other purposes.
- Citation: 1 Edw. 8 & 1 Geo. 6. c. xcvi
- Territorial extent: United Kingdom

Dates
- Royal assent: 20 July 1937
- Commencement: 20 July 1937
Other legislation
Amended by	Whitehaven Harbour Act 1981
Relates to	Whitehaven Town and Harbour (Incorporation) Act 1885

Status: Amended

Whitehaven Harbour Act 1962 (Note: Section 1(1).)
- Act of Parliament
- Parliament of the United Kingdom
- Long title: An Act to make provision in relation to the application of the revenue of the Whitehaven Harbour Commissioners and the payment of interest on bonds of the Commissioners; to authorise the creation of a reserve fund; and for other purposes.
- Citation: 10 & 11 Eliz. 2. c. ix
- Territorial extent: United Kingdom

Dates
- Royal assent: 18 April 1962
- Commencement: 18 April 1962
Other legislation
Amends	Whitehaven Town and Harbour (Incorporation) Act 1885; Whitehaven Harbour and Dock Act 1887; Pier and Harbour Order Confirmation (No. 1) Act 1930; Whitehaven Harbour Act 1937; Whitehaven Harbour Order 1954
Amended by	Whitehaven Harbour Act 1970; Whitehaven Harbour Act 1981
Relates to	Harbours, Docks, and Piers Clauses Act 1847; Whitehaven Town and Harbour (Incorporation) Act 1885

Text of statute as originally enacted

Whitehaven Harbour Act 1970 (Note: Section 1(1).)
- Act of Parliament
- Parliament of the United Kingdom
- Long title: An Act to authorise the Whitehaven Harbour Commissioners to construct further works; and for other purposes.
- Citation: 1970 c. lii
- Territorial extent: United Kingdom

Dates
- Royal assent: 23 July 1970
- Commencement: 23 July 1970
Other legislation
Amends	Whitehaven Harbour Act 1962
Amended by	Whitehaven Harbour Act 1981
Relates to	Land Clauses Consolidation Act 1845; Whitehaven Town and Harbour (Incorporation) Act 1885; Harbours Act 1964; Compulsory Purchase Act 1965

Text of statute as originally enacted

Whitehaven Harbour Act 1981 (Note: Section 1(1).)
- Act of Parliament
- Parliament of the United Kingdom
- Long title: An Act to increase the borrowing powers of the Whitehaven Harbour Commissioners; to confer on the Commissioners further powers pursuant to the Harbours, Docks, and Piers Clauses Act 1847; to make further provision for the regulation of the harbour; and for purposes connected therewith.
- Citation: 1981 c. xvi
- Territorial extent: United Kingdom

Dates
- Royal assent: 2 July 1981
- Commencement: 2 July 1981
Other legislation
Amends	Whitehaven Town and Harbour Act 1859; Whitehaven Dock and Railways Act 1871; Whitehaven Harbour and Town Improvement Act 1876; Whitehaven Town and Harbour Act 1879; Whitehaven Town and Harbour (Incorporation) Act 1885; Whitehaven Harbour Act 1937; Whitehaven Harbour Order 1954; Whitehaven Harbour Act 1962; Whitehaven Harbour Act 1970
Relates to	Harbours, Docks, and Piers Clauses Act 1847; Whitehaven Town and Harbour (Incorporation) Act 1885

Text of statute as originally enacted

Whitehaven Harbour Act 2007 (Note: Section 1(1).)
- Act of Parliament
- Parliament of the United Kingdom
- Long title: An Act to transfer to Whitehaven Harbour Commissioners all rights, properties, assets and obligations of W3M Charitable Foundation, Whitehaven Development Company Limited and W3M (Trading) Limited; to dissolve those companies; and for other purposes.
- Citation: 2007 c. i
- Territorial extent: United Kingdom

Dates
- Royal assent: 19 July 2007
- Commencement: 18 August 2007 (Note: Section 1(2).)
Other legislation
Relates to	Whitehaven Harbour Act 1708; Whitehaven Town and Harbour (Incorporation) Act 1885

Status: Current legislation

Text of statute as originally enacted

The existence of a harbour or landing place at Whitehaven can be traced back to 1517, when quay-dues, otherwise known as wharfage, were recorded.

The purchase of the manor of St Bees in 1630 by the Lowther family started the development of Whitehaven harbour primarily to export coal. Sir Christopher Lowther built a stone pier in 1631–1634, and it survives, albeit very modified, as the Old Quay.

By the 1660s the pier was suffering from storm damage and by the 1670s it was considered too small for the growing number of vessels wanting to use it. In 1677 a description refers to "a little pier, in shallow water, built with some wooden piles and stones".

The prospect of a rival pier being built at Parton to the north of Whitehaven galvanised Sir John Lowther into developing the harbour, and by 1679 further work was under way. In the late 17th and 18th century the harbour was extended by ballast walls, moles and piers to become one of the most complex pier harbours in Britain. April 1778 saw the harbour as the first site of an American attack on the British Isles during the American War of Independence.

The port's trade waned rapidly when ports with much larger shipping capacity, such as Bristol and Liverpool, began to take over its main trade. Its peak of prosperity was in the 19th century when West Cumberland experienced a brief boom because haematite found locally was one of the few iron ores that could be used to produce steel by the original Bessemer process. Improvements to the Bessemer process and the development of the open hearth process removed this advantage. In the 20th century, as in most mining communities, the inter-war Great Depression was severe; this was exacerbated for West Cumbria by Irish independence which suddenly placed tariff barriers on its principal export market.

The harbour lost its last commercial cargo handling operation in 1992 when Marchon ceased their phosphate rock import operations. Drivers Jonas and marine consulting engineers Beckett Rankine drew up a new master plan to impound the inner basins of the harbour to create a large marina and fishing harbour, and refocus the town on a renovated harbour.

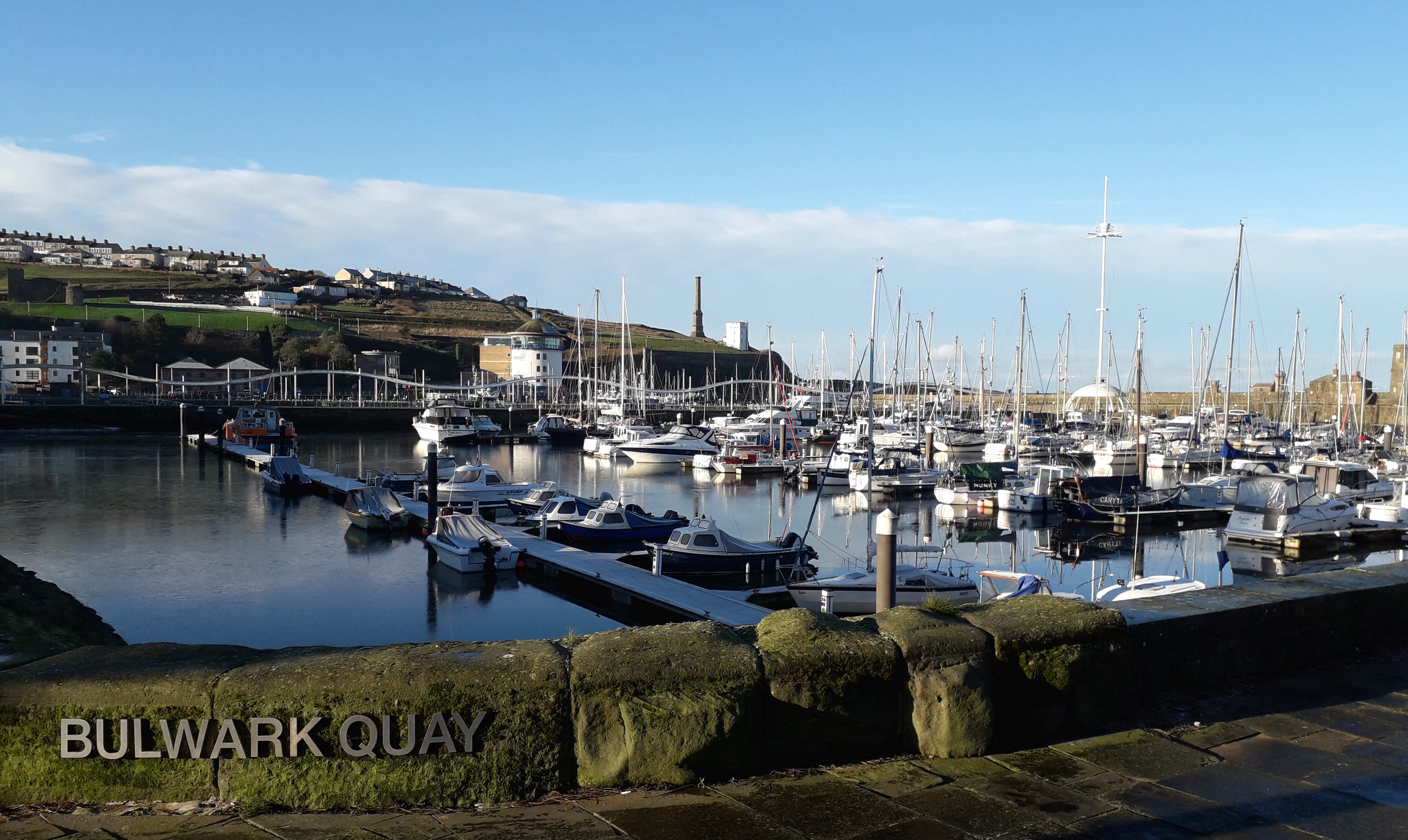
The marina, and in the background, the Beacon museum and the candlestick chimney

The harbour has seen much other renovation due to millennium developments, and the rejuvenation project cost an estimated £11.3 million. This has provided 100 more moorings within the marina. Another £5.5 million has been spent on developing a 40 m (130 ft) high crow's nest and a wave light feature that changes colour depending on the tide, together with The Rum Story on Lowther Street, voted Cumbria Tourism's small visitor attraction of the year 2007. A picture of the harbour was used on the front page of the Tate Modern's promotional material for an exhibition of Millennium Projects in 2003. In June 2008, Queen Elizabeth II visited Whitehaven as part of the 300th Anniversary Celebrations. The Queen and Prince Philip then officially re-opened the refurbished Beacon museum at the harbour; 10,000 people attended the event.

== Town planning ==
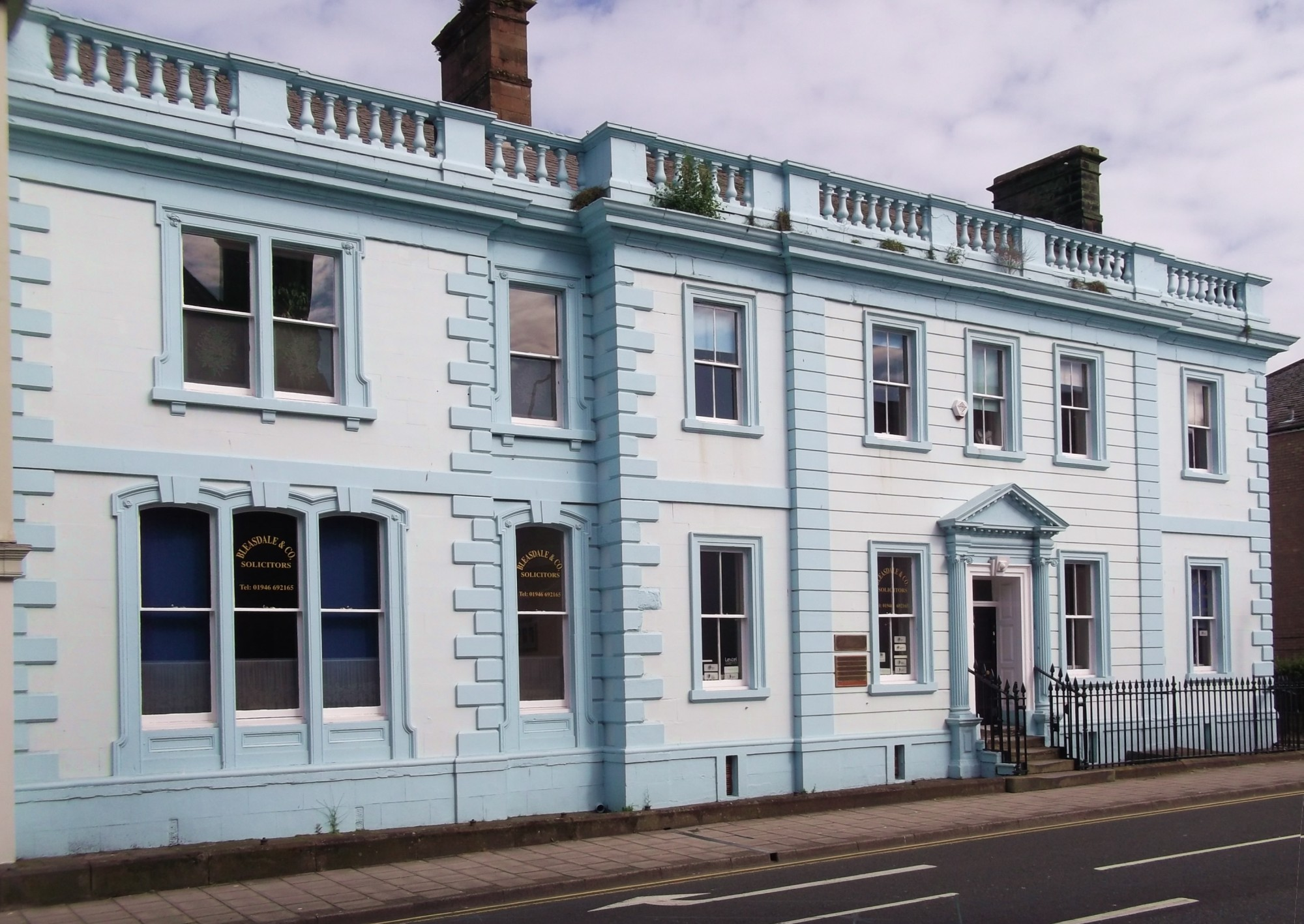
One of the fine terraces in the town – on Scotch Street

Whitehaven was, with Falmouth, the first post-medieval new planned town in England. It is the most complete example of planned Georgian architecture in Europe and there are over 170 listed buildings. Whitehaven's planned layout was with streets in a right-angled grid which it is thought was imitated by the new towns of the American Colonies, with which there were strong trade links.

Although Sir Christopher Lowther initially purchased Whitehaven it was his son, Sir John Lowther, 2nd Baronet, who was responsible for its growth and development. Sir John acquired a market charter in 1660 for the town, but the urban expansion did not start until the 1680s when he laid out a spacious rectangular grid of streets to the north east of the existing tiny hamlet.

Sir John specified that the houses were "to be three storeys high, not less than 28 feet from the street level to the square of the side walls, the windows of the first and second storeys to be transomed and the same, together with the doors to be of hewn stone." Ample provision was made for gardens.

One block was left vacant for a new church and in 1694 another site was given for a Presbyterian chapel. Most of the streets were relatively narrow, about ten yards, but the principal thoroughfare, Lowther Street, which ran through the town centre from the Lowther family residence to the waterfront, was 16 yards wide. The old St Nicholas chapel was demolished in 1693 to make way for Lowther Street, and its materials used to build a new school.

Whitehaven Castle was built in 1769 for Sir John Lowther as his private residence at the end of Lowther Street, replacing an earlier building destroyed by fire. In 1924, the Earl of Lonsdale sold Whitehaven Castle to Herbert Wilson Walker, a local industrialist. Walker donated the building to the people of West Cumberland, along with £20,000 to convert it into a hospital to replace the old Whitehaven Infirmary at Howgill Street, which was established in 1830.

In 1964, Whitehaven was identified as one of 51 gem towns by the Council for British Archaeology due to the historic quality of the town environment.

== Railways ==
Whitehaven is on the Cumbrian Coast Line which runs from Carlisle to Barrow-in-Furness. The town has two railway stations: Whitehaven (Bransty) and Corkickle, joined by a tunnel underneath the town.

=== Coming of the public railway ===
The first railway to reach Whitehaven was the Whitehaven Junction Railway (WJR) in 1847 from Maryport, which terminated at the Bransty Row station and allowed rail access to Carlisle and Newcastle upon Tyne. On the southern side of the town, the first section of the Whitehaven and Furness Junction Railway (W&FJR) opened on 1 June 1849 from a terminus at Whitehaven (Preston Street) to Ravenglass, and thereafter gradually in stages until Barrow in Furness and ultimately Carnforth were reached. This gave access to the south onto the main West Coast line, and later became the main line of the Furness Railway. The two lines were separated by the town centre, and a tramway was constructed through the market place allowing goods wagons to be horse-drawn from Preston Street to the harbour, but there was still no through route for passenger trains. In 1852, a tunnel 1,333 yards (1,219 m) long was built under the town, and in 1854 the W&FJR passenger trains ran through to the Bransty station from a new station at Corkickle. Preston Street became a goods-only station and served as the main goods depot for the town.

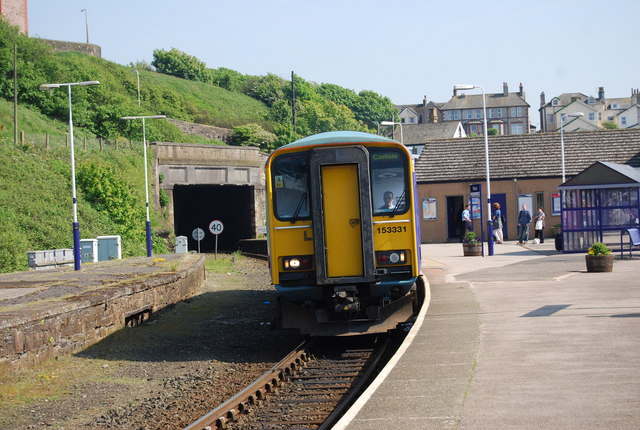
Whitehaven station, with the tunnel to Corkickle seen behind

=== Industrial networks ===
As in other colliery areas, horse-drawn tramways and then locomotive-powered railways were used extensively to move coal. The first steam locomotive made an early appearance in 1816, to a design similar to the noted Steam Elephant built by William Chapman of Newcastle. However this pioneering engine was not too successful and was converted to a pumping and winding engine. Nonetheless, the harbour and collieries eventually developed an extensive network of industrial railways within the constraints of the steep valley sides and the coast. The system had two roped inclines. The Howgill incline connected Ladysmith pit on the steep north-western side of the valley to Wellington pit at the harbour, and operated to the 1970s, and on the south of the town the Corkickle incline, known locally as "The Brake", was built in 1881 from the Furness Railway main line to Croft Pit. This closed in 1931 but was reopened in May 1955 to serve Marchon Products' chemical factory. The Brake closed for good on 31 October 1986, when it was the last commercial roped incline in Britain. It was 525 yards (480 m) in length with gradients of between 1 in 5.2 and 1 in 6.6.

=== Engineering ===
The nearby Lowca engineering works began to produce locomotives in 1843, including the first Crampton locomotives, which became the fastest locomotives of the day; one was reported to have reached 62 mph. Over the life of the works, some 260 locomotives were produced – mainly for industrial lines. The works entered shipbuilding in 1842–3, producing Lowca, the first iron ship launched in Cumberland.

== Industries ==
=== Marchon chemical complex ===
In 1941, Fred Marzillier and Frank Schon relocated Marchon Products Ltd from London to Whitehaven, which was a special development area, after their offices were destroyed by German bombing. At Whitehaven they started manufacturing firelighters, then in 1943 they moved production to the site of the Ladysmith pit coke ovens at Kells, where they formed a sister company, "Solway Chemicals", to produce liquid fertilisers and foaming agents. At the end of the war, a number of chemists and engineers were released after the closure of the Royal Ordnance Factories at Drigg and Sellafield. This helped drive the pioneering expansion into detergent bases to include some of the first soap-substitutes to reach the UK market.

The new detergents were a big success, as soap was in short supply after the war; however the original reason for moving to Whitehaven, remoteness from Europe, was now a serious handicap as the site was remote from raw materials. The answer was to manufacture as much processed raw material as possible on the site. New plants were built for the production of fatty alcohols in a pioneering process; tripolyphosphate was produced on site using phosphate rock from Casablanca imported via the harbour; and sulphuric acid was produced using anhydrite from the specially created Sandwith mine adjacent to the factory. Production diversified further into specialist additives and chemicals, and continued to expand to become the town's largest employer, with 2,300 employees.

In 1955 the companies were taken over by Albright and Wilson, and they in turn were taken over by the French company, Rhodia, in 1999. The decline of this site had started in the late 1980s, and finally in 2005 the site was closed down after a number of production processes had been terminated over the years.

=== Sekers Fabrics ===
To help counter the 50% unemployment in the area, John Adams, of the West Cumberland Industrial Development Company, invited Miki Sekers and his cousin, Tomi de Gara to establish the West Cumberland Silk Mills at Hensingham, Whitehaven in 1938. The intention was to manufacture high quality silk and rayon fabrics for the fashion trade, but during World War II they mainly produced parachute nylon. After the war, it became Sekers Fabrics and reverted to its original purpose. It supplied material to the great fashion houses such as Edward Molyneux and Bianca Mosca in London and Christian Dior, Pierre Cardin and Givenchy in Paris. At the same time it supplied luxury-style dress materials within the purchasing power of most home dressmakers working in nylon.

The company was awarded the Duke of Edinburgh prize for elegant design in 1962, 1965 and 1973, and a Royal warrant was awarded as suppliers of furnishing fabric to Her Majesty the Queen. In 1964, they established a large showroom at 190-192 Sloane Street, London.

Miki Sekers was appointed an MBE in 1955 for services to the fashion industry, and was knighted in 1965 for services to the arts.

The Whitehaven silk mill closed in 2006.

=== Cumberland Curled Hair Ltd ===
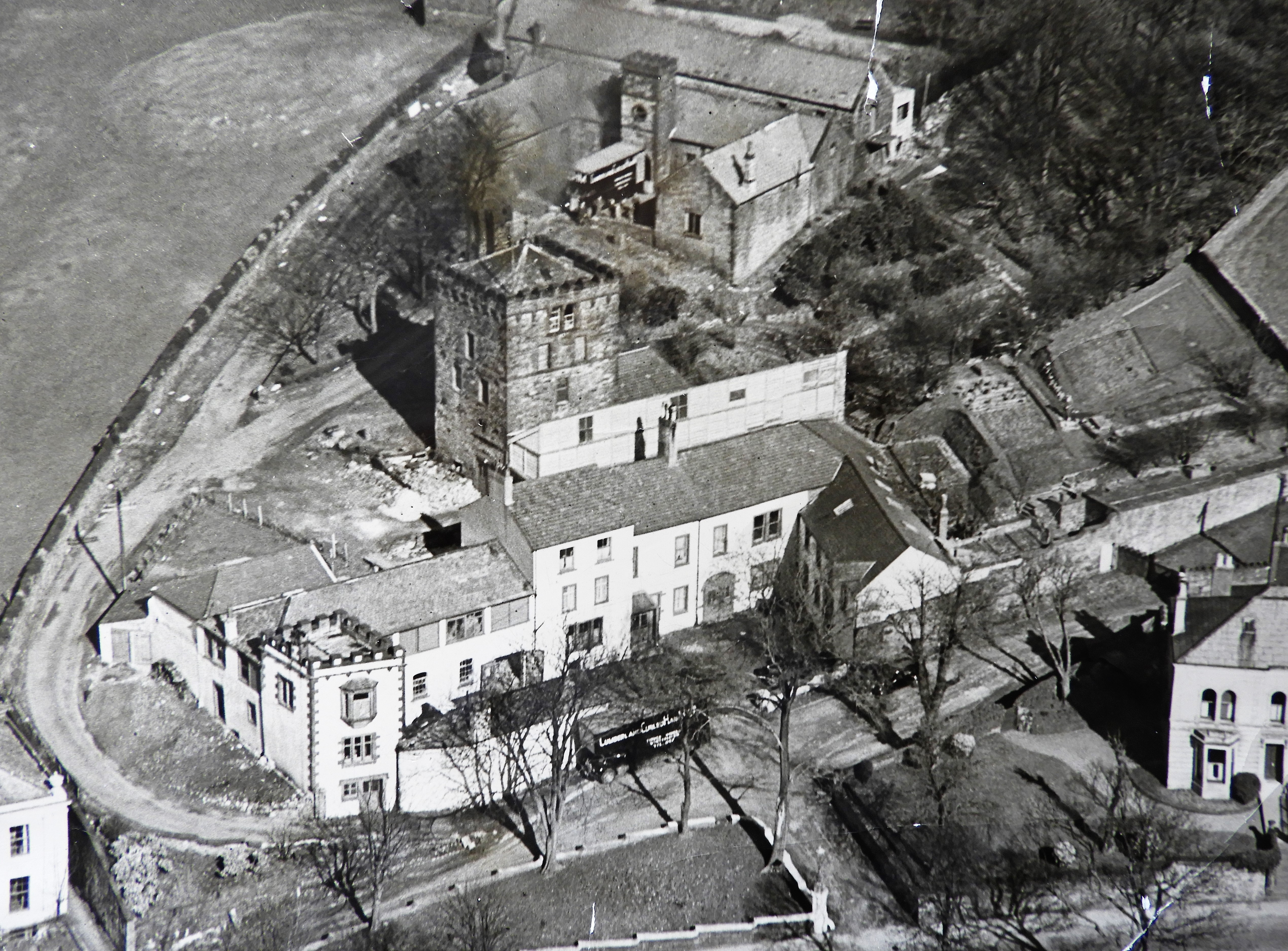
The old Tower Brewery in Whitehaven, with its tower

In 1945, Kurt Oppenheim, a 26-year-old refugee from Nazi Germany, bought the abandoned Whitehaven Brewery site on Inkerman Terrace and began using it as a home for the family and a factory to house the production of curled hair. Curled hair was utilised as part of the filling for bed mattresses, railway and carriage seating, car and domestic upholstery and when rubberised it was used in flooring.

Oppenheim's family had been in the curled hair manufacturing business for many generations in Kassel, Germany, with factories in Kassel and Basel, Switzerland. After the war, however, little of the business remained. Oppenheim started up again in Whitehaven on a small amount of borrowed funds. The product was manufactured from horse and cow hair sourced from China and Argentina. Hair was cleansed, spun into rope on machinery mainly produced in continental Europe and then the rope was broken up to produce the hair with a spring-like curl in it. This bulky product was bagged and sent off to customers all over the UK.

With the introduction of synthetic upholstery fillings in the late 1950s and early 1960s, the UK curled hair business began to contract and Cumberland Curled Hair consolidated the industry by buying up competitors that were closing down and moved their production to Whitehaven. The business expanded into a factory in the Hensingham industrial area and brought employment to about eighty people of the town.

The new foam business was called Cheri Foam. By the mid-1960s, the space requirements outgrew the factory in Hensingham and only the offices were kept in the original Tower Brewery in Whitehaven, whilst production of curled hair and flexile urethane foam was moved to an 11-acre site with two large aircraft hangars at Silloth Airfield.

== Sport ==
=== Rugby League ===
Whitehaven is a rugby league stronghold, its team Whitehaven R.L.F.C. play in the second tier of the British rugby league system. Their mascot is a lion called "Pride".

Other teams include;

- Kells A.R.L.F.C. play in the National Conference League Premier Division.
- Hensingham ARLFC are an Amateur Rugby league based in Whitehaven. Founded in 1900 It wasn't until 1920 that the Club changed its allegiances to Rugby League. Hensingham is one of the oldest rugby clubs in the country. They play their rugby in the National Conference League Division 3.
- There are several Whitehaven-based teams playing in the amateur Cumberland League.
- Whitehaven's female amateur R.L.F.C is named the "Wildcats".

=== Other sports ===
Whitehaven F.C. currently play in the West Lancashire Football League.

Whitehaven Cricket Club play in the Cumbria Cricket League and jointly share their pitch "The Playground" with Whitehaven RUFC.

The opening stage of the Tour of Britain Women's cycle race passed through Whitehaven in 2026.

== "Jam eater" ==
The term "jam eater" is often used by the people of neighbouring Workington to refer to the people of Whitehaven, or more generally to people from West Cumbria. When the Financial Times ran a light-hearted article on famous feuds in September 2008, featuring this, the local Whitehaven News published its own complementary feature, reporting that: "The common view is that the term is insulting because it implies people could not afford to buy meat for their sandwiches, so they had to eat jam instead."

The original article had summed up the situation in terms of the long-term rivalry between Whitehaven and nearby Workington: "Legend has it that one town's miners had jam on their sandwiches and the other did not, but no one agrees on which town it was or whether they did it because they were snobs or peasants." A reader from Maryport, a few miles further up the Cumbria coast (which, as occasionally mentioned in discussions on the topic, used to have a jam factory) reported that he had understood the term originally referred to people from Whitehaven, and this was echoed in the comments on the Whitehaven News article, suggesting that a former distinction between the Whitehaven "jam eaters" and Workington "high siders" had gradually been lost in the trading of insults across the rugby pitch.

== Maritime Festival ==
Whitehaven has also played host to a Maritime Festival, which started in 1999 and was held every two years, and then annually (the last being in 2013) attracting an estimated 350,000 people to the small town.

Attractions included tall ships, air displays which included the Red Arrows and various modern and old planes, street entertainment and firework displays. At the 2003, 2005 and 2007 festivals the local Sea Cadets were very much in evidence, conducting the traditional Evening Colours ceremony each evening aboard one of the visiting tall ships, and also taking part in the festival's official closing ceremony during the late Sunday afternoon each year.

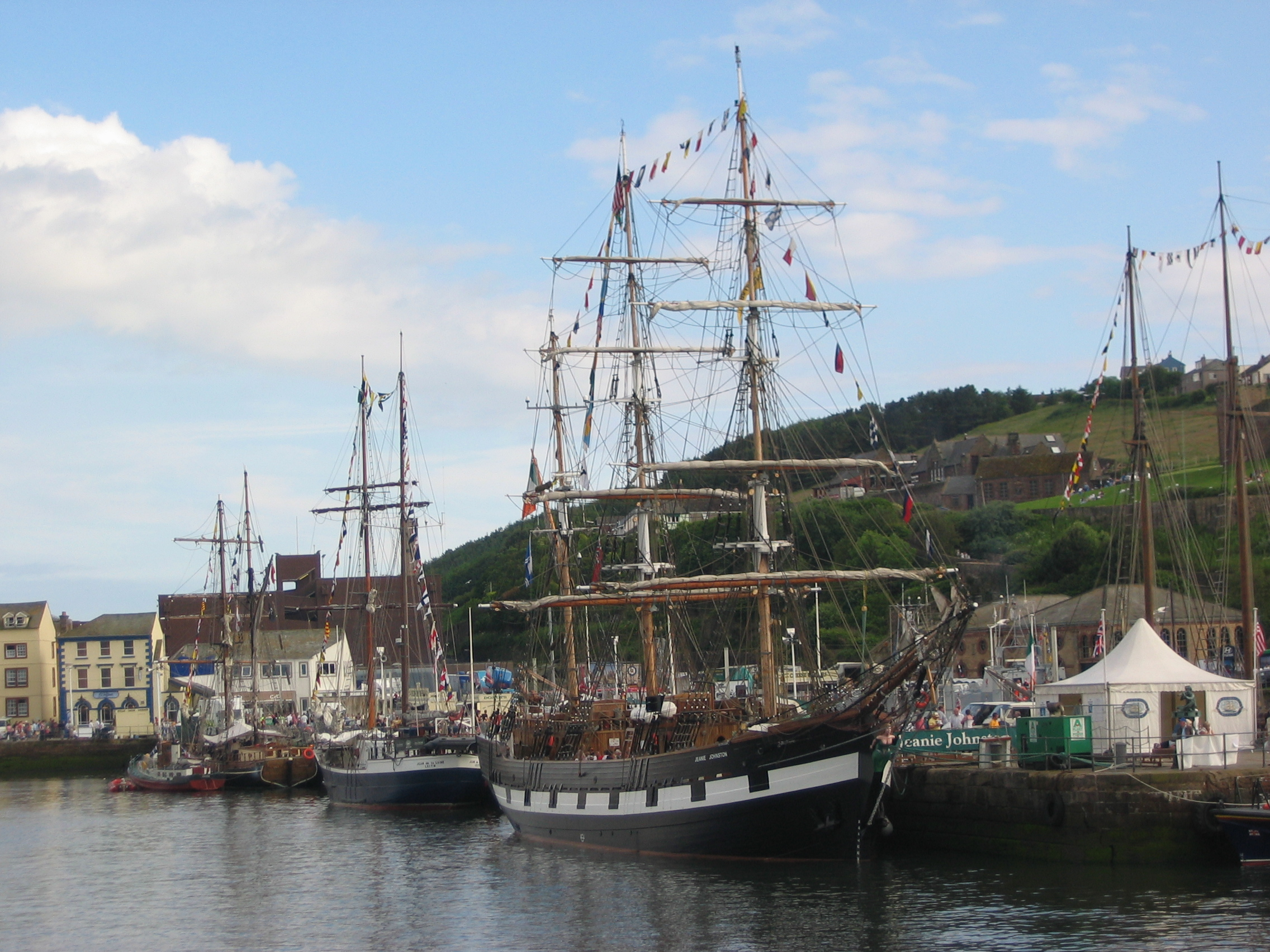
Whitehaven Maritime Festival 2005

The 2005 festival also marked the 60th anniversary of the end of the Second World War, in which Whitehaven had been designated Cumbria's official commemoration celebration. Up to 1,000 veterans and ex-service personnel took part in the parade from the town's Castle Park to the harbour side, led by members of three military bands. Services were held on the harbour side, and aircraft from the Royal Air Force provided a tribute display above the harbour.

The Maritime Festivals were founded by Gerard Richardson and organised by the Whitehaven Festival Company, made up of a board of volunteers, who organised 17 major events between 1999 and 2015. The company was closed in 2016. They organised the Queen's visit to Whitehaven in June 2008, followed by the Status Quo gig in August of that year. The company staged two events in August 2009. The first was the redesigned festival (known for this year as the Whitehaven Food Festival, although it did still feature tall ships) which offered the usual wide variety of attractions, both around the southern half of the harbour and at St. Nicholas' Church, on 8–9 August. The second event, the following week, was the Here and Now Gig (a music concert with 1980's pop icons). For the June 2010 festival, which was similar in format to 2009, the music performances (Status Quo, N-Dubz and Katherine Jenkins) were moved to the harbour area.

The 2011 festival (featuring Razorlight plus several 1980s acts including Madness) continued the successful culinary theme, with the return of Jean-Christophe Novelli and other favourites. In 2012 the date of the festival was changed to the first weekend in June, to make it part of the Queen's Diamond Jubilee celebration (with a red, white and blue themed firework display).

== Local media ==
Local news and television programmes are provided by BBC North East and Cumbria and ITV Border. Television signals are received from the local relay transmitter.

Whitehaven's local radio stations are BBC Radio Cumbria, Greatest Hits Radio Cumbria & South West Scotland ex and Hospital Radio Haven, a community based radio that broadcast from the West Cumberland Hospital in the town.

The Whitehaven News is the town's local newspaper.

== June 2010 shootings ==
On 2 June 2010, Whitehaven became a focus in the international media in relation to gun laws in the United Kingdom, following a killing spree targeting people living in the western area of the county. After killing his twin brother in Lamplugh, and his family solicitor in Frizington, taxi driver Derrick Bird began the spree in Whitehaven, shooting several people on the streets and at the taxi rank where he worked, killing 12.

== Digital switchover trial ==
On 20 July 2006, Broadcasting Minister Shaun Woodward and Industry Minister Margaret Hodge announced that Whitehaven would be the pilot site for the switchover to digital terrestrial television in the United Kingdom. The selection of a pilot site followed on from trial switchovers held in Ferryside and Bolton.

The switchover began when BBC Two was switched off at 02:00 on 17 October 2007. This was followed by the remaining analogue channels at 02:00, on 14 November 2007. As a result of the switchover, all televisions in the Whitehaven area had to have a digital terrestrial receiver (Freeview) or digital satellite alternative (Freesat, Sky, etc.) (Note: In other areas, additional alternatives to Freeview were available, such as the cable-based Virgin Media.) The switchover in the Whitehaven area was not entirely successful: in nearby Eskdale, poor signal quality left viewers with blank television screens and the digital switchover was supposed to give over 40 channels but certain areas received fewer than 20.

== Notable people ==
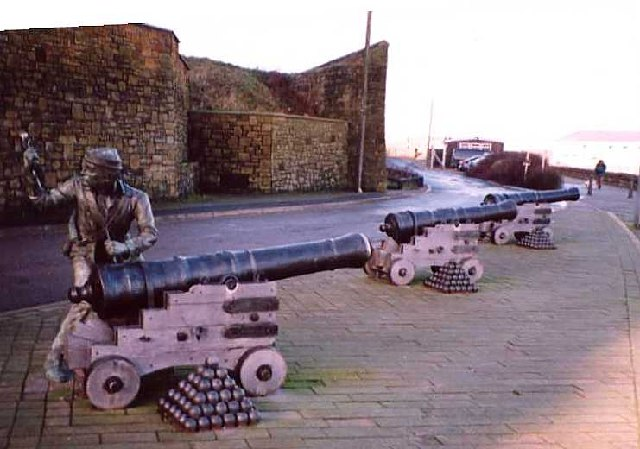
Modern sculpture commemorating the John Paul Jones raid in 1778

In alphabetical order:

- Abraham Acton (1893–1915), British Army recipient of the Victoria Cross in World War I
- Gilbert Smithson Adair (1896–1979), protein chemist born in Whitehaven
- Kyle Amor (born 1987), Ireland international rugby league footballer
- John Beck (b. 29 July 1961), keyboard player for It Bites
- John Benson (died 1798), clockmaker
- Dame Edith Mary Brown (1864–1956), doctor who founded the first medical training facility for women in Asia
- William Brownrigg (1711–1800), doctor and scientist
- Scott Carson (born 1985), footballer
- Taylor Charters (born 2001), footballer
- Jordan Clark (born 1990), cricketer
- Craig Cook (born1987), speedway rider
- Stuart Cummings (born 1960), rugby league referee
- Shepherd Dawson (1880–1935), author and psychologist
- Malcolm Eccles (born 1969), businessman
- Jonny Edgar (born 2004), racing driver in the European Le Mans Series
- Mildred Gale (1671–1701), paternal grandmother of George Washington, lived in Whitehaven and is buried in the graveyard of St Nicholas's Church
- Dean Henderson (born 1997), Premier League footballer with Crystal Palace
- Brian Higgins (born 1959), record producer
- Dick Huddart (1936–2021), rugby league player
- Milton Huddart (1960–2015), rugby league player
- John Paul Jones (1747–1792), slave trader and father of the American Navy, began his career in Whitehaven and returned in 1778 aboard the Ranger. He led a naval raid on the town in 1778 in the American War of Independence.
- Brad Kavanagh (born 1992), actor
- Jack Lawson (1881–1965), Lord Lawson of Beamish, British trade unionist and Labour politician
- Guy Lovell (born 1969), cricketer
- Jane Pearson (1735–1816), Quaker minister based here for 42 years
- Matthew Postlethwaite (born 1991), actor
- Gerard Richardson (born 1962), founder of the International Maritime Festival, author and businessman
- John "Sol" Roper (1936–2015), professional rugby league footballer and coach
- Robert Salmon, (1775–1844), maritime artist
- Frank Schon, Baron Schon (1912–1995), co-founder of Marchon Chemicals
- Miki Sekers (1910–1972), co-founder of Sekers Fabrics
- Jackie Sewell (1927–2016), footballer
- Adam Summerfield (born 1990), professional ice hockey player for Manchester Phoenix
- Jonathan Swift (1667–1745), claimed an over-fond nurse kidnapped and brought him to Whitehaven for three years in his infancy.
- William Thomson (1819–1890), Archbishop of York in 1862–1890
- Charlie Woods (born 1941), footballer (Cleator Moor Celtic, Newcastle United, Crystal Palace and Ipswich Town), coach and football scout. Woods became a football coach and scout working alongside England football manager Bobby Robson throughout most of Robson's career including England.
- William Wordsworth (1770–1850), Poet Laureate from 1843 to 1850, frequently visited Whitehaven

== Twin cities ==
- Kozloduy, Bulgaria

== See also ==
- Listed buildings in Whitehaven
- Lowther baronets
- The Whitehaven Academy
