= Cumbria County Council elections =

Local government elections in Cumbria, England

Cumbria County Council in England was elected every four years between 1973 and 2017. Since the last boundary changes in 2013, 84 councillors were elected from 84 wards for the last council before abolition in 2023.

== Political control ==
The first election to the council was held in 1973, initially operating as a shadow authority alongside the outgoing authorities until the new arrangements came into effect on 1 April 1974. Political control of the council from 1974 until its abolition in 2023 was as follows:

| Party in control | Years |
|---|---|
| No overall control | 1974–1977 |
| Conservative | 1977–1981 |
| Labour | 1981–1985 |
| No overall control | 1985–1997 |
| Labour | 1997–2001 |
| No overall control | 2001–2023 |

=== Leadership ===
The leaders of the council from 1986 until its abolition in 2023 were:

| Councillor | Party | From | To |
|---|---|---|---|
| Bill Minto | Labour | 1986 | 9 May 2000 |
| Stewart Young | Labour | 9 May 2000 | 21 Jun 2001 |
| Rex Toft | Conservative | 21 Jun 2001 | 16 Sep 2004 |
| Tim Stoddard | Conservative | 16 Sep 2004 | 10 Sep 2008 |
| Stewart Young | Labour | 10 Sep 2008 | Jun 2009 |
| Jim Buchanan | Conservative | 18 Jun 2009 | 8 Apr 2010 |
| Eddie Martin | Conservative | 22 Apr 2010 | May 2013 |
| Stewart Young | Labour | 16 May 2013 | 31 Mar 2023 |

== Council elections ==
- 1973 Cumbria County Council election
- 1977 Cumbria County Council election
- 1981 Cumbria County Council election (boundary changes increased the number of seats by 1)
- 1985 Cumbria County Council election
- 1989 Cumbria County Council election
- 1993 Cumbria County Council election
- 1997 Cumbria County Council election
- 2001 Cumbria County Council election (boundary changes reduced the number of seats by 1)
- 2005 Cumbria County Council election
- 2009 Cumbria County Council election
- 2013 Cumbria County Council election
- 2017 Cumbria County Council election

== Election results ==
| | Overall control | Conservative | Labour | Lib Dems (Note: Social and Liberal Democrats in 1989, SDP–Liberal Alliance in 1985, Liberal Party in 1981, 1977, and 1973.) | Socialist People's | Liberal | Independent |
| 2017 | NOC | 37 | 26 | 16 | - | - | 5 |
| 2013 | NOC | 26 | 35 | 16 | - | - | 7 |
| 2009 | NOC | 38 | 24 | 16 | 1 | - | 5 |
| 2005 | NOC | 32 | 39 | 11 | - | - | 2 |
| 2001 | NOC | 33 | 40 | 10 | - | - | 1 |
| 2001 | NOC | 33 | 40 | 10 | - | - | 1 |
| 1997 | Labour | 22 | 44 | 13 | - | - | 4 |
| 1993 | NOC | 28 | 39 | 13 | - | 1 | 2 |
| 1989 | NOC | 37 | 37 | 6 | - | - | 3 |
| 1985 | NOC | 36 | 39 | 5 | - | - | 3 |
| 1981 | NOC | 35 | 42 | 3 | - | - | 3 |
| 1977 | Conservative | 52 | 23 | - | - | - | 7 |
| 1973 | NOC | 31 | 38 | 1 | - | - | 12 |

== County result maps ==
2001 results map

2005 results map

2009 results map

2013 results map

2017 results map

== By-election results ==
=== 1993-1997 ===
Penrith South East By-Election 7 November 1996
| Party | Candidate | Votes | % | ±% |
|---|---|---|---|---|
| Conservative | | 616 | 41.0 | |
| Liberal Democrats | | 510 | 34.0 | |
| Labour | | 317 | 21.0 | |
| Independent | | 51 | 3.4 | |
| Majority | | 106 | 7.0 | |
| Turnout | | 1,494 | 25.0 | |
| Conservative hold | | Swing | | |

=== 1997-2001 ===
Far Cross By-Election 17 September 1998
| Party | Candidate | Votes | % | ±% |
|---|---|---|---|---|
| Liberal Democrats | | 908 | 62.6 | +11.8 |
| Conservative | | 328 | 22.6 | −5.4 |
| Labour | | 214 | 14.8 | −6.4 |
| Majority | | 580 | 40.0 | |
| Turnout | | 1,450 | | |
| Liberal Democrats hold | | Swing | | |

Hawcoat By-Election 11 March 1999
| Party | Candidate | Votes | % | ±% |
|---|---|---|---|---|
| Conservative | | 660 | 82.9 | +18.2 |
| Labour | | 136 | 17.1 | −18.2 |
| Majority | | 524 | 65.8 | |
| Turnout | | 796 | 17.9 | |
| Conservative hold | | Swing | | |

Upper Kent By-Election 6 May 1999
| Party | Candidate | Votes | % | ±% |
|---|---|---|---|---|
| Liberal Democrats | | 930 | 55.7 | −0.1 |
| Conservative | | 558 | 33.4 | −0.3 |
| Labour | | 182 | 10.9 | +0.4 |
| Majority | | 372 | 22.3 | |
| Turnout | | 1,670 | | |
| Liberal Democrats hold | | Swing | | |

Barrow Central By-Election 10 June 1999
| Party | Candidate | Votes | % | ±% |
|---|---|---|---|---|
| Labour | | 332 | 45.0 | −31.4 |
| Independent | | 255 | 34.6 | +34.6 |
| Conservative | | 151 | 20.5 | −3.1 |
| Majority | | 77 | 10.4 | |
| Turnout | | 738 | 20.5 | |
| Labour hold | | Swing | | |

Belle Vue By-Election 10 June 1999
| Party | Candidate | Votes | % | ±% |
|---|---|---|---|---|
| Conservative | | 346 | 37.4 | +9.8 |
| Labour | | 340 | 36.8 | −18.4 |
| Liberal Democrats | | 238 | 25.8 | +8.2 |
| Majority | | 6 | 0.6 | |
| Turnout | | 924 | | |
| Conservative gain from Labour | | Swing | | |

=== 2001-2005 ===
Alston and East Fellside By-Election 1 May 2003
| Party | Candidate | Votes | % | ±% |
|---|---|---|---|---|
| Conservative | Isa Henderson | 797 | 41.8 | +6.3 |
| Independent | Bryan Metz | 787 | 41.2 | +22.0 |
| Labour | Christopher Bagshaw | 324 | 17.0 | +7.6 |
| Majority | | 10 | 0.6 | |
| Turnout | | 1,908 | 41.0 | |
| Conservative hold | | Swing | | |

Grange By-Election 24 July 2003
| Party | Candidate | Votes | % | ±% |
|---|---|---|---|---|
| Conservative | | 1,229 | 66.2 | +6.0 |
| Liberal Democrats | | 556 | 30.0 | −9.8 |
| Labour | | 71 | 3.8 | +3.8 |
| Majority | | 673 | 36.2 | |
| Turnout | | 1,856 | 36.8 | |
| Conservative hold | | Swing | | |

St Michaels By-Election 16 October 2003
| Party | Candidate | Votes | % | ±% |
|---|---|---|---|---|
| Liberal Democrats | | 889 | 51.1 | +41.4 |
| Labour | | 851 | 48.9 | −26.2 |
| Majority | | 38 | 2.2 | |
| Turnout | | 1,740 | 44.4 | |
| Liberal Democrats gain from Labour | | Swing | | |

Mary Port East By-Election 4 March 2004
| Party | Candidate | Votes | % | ±% |
|---|---|---|---|---|
| Labour | | 645 | 57.5 | −25.5 |
| Liberal Democrats | | 476 | 42.5 | +42.5 |
| Majority | | 169 | 15.0 | |
| Turnout | | 1,121 | 22.0 | |
| Labour hold | | Swing | | |

Old Barrow By-Election 25 November 2004
| Party | Candidate | Votes | % | ±% |
|---|---|---|---|---|
| Independent | | 273 | 62.8 | +62.8 |
| Labour | | 162 | 37.2 | −17.2 |
| Majority | | 111 | 25.6 | |
| Turnout | | 435 | 13.3 | |
| Independent gain from Labour | | Swing | | |

=== 2005-2009 ===
St Johns By-Election 22 June 2006
| Party | Candidate | Votes | % | ±% |
|---|---|---|---|---|
| Labour | Joseph Holliday | 658 | 53.3 | −4.5 |
| Conservative | John Heathcote | 430 | 34.8 | −7.4 |
| Independent | John Bracken | 120 | 9.7 | +9.7 |
| Green | Lynn Bates | 26 | 2.1 | +2.1 |
| Majority | | 228 | 18.5 | |
| Turnout | | 1,234 | 32.3 | |
| Labour hold | | Swing | | |

Brampton and Gilsland By-Election 25 January 2007
| Party | Candidate | Votes | % | ±% |
|---|---|---|---|---|
| Conservative | Lawrence Fisher | 717 | 61.4 | +13.6 |
| Labour | Alex Faulds | 363 | 31.1 | +2.9 |
| BNP | David Fisher | 88 | 7.5 | +7.5 |
| Majority | | 354 | 30.3 | |
| Turnout | | 1,168 | 23.3 | |
| Conservative hold | | Swing | | |

Castle By-Election 22 February 2007
| Party | Candidate | Votes | % | ±% |
|---|---|---|---|---|
| Liberal Democrats | Olwyn Lockley | 653 | 64.0 | +20.2 |
| Labour | Joseph Hendry | 222 | 21.7 | −18.2 |
| Conservative | James Bainbridge | 117 | 11.5 | −4.8 |
| Green | Lynn Bates | 29 | 2.8 | +2.8 |
| Majority | | 431 | 42.3 | |
| Turnout | | 1,021 | 25.2 | |
| Liberal Democrats hold | | Swing | | |

Penrith East By-Election 25 October 2007
| Party | Candidate | Votes | % | ±% |
|---|---|---|---|---|
| Liberal Democrats | Patricia Bell | 800 | 59.8 | +14.7 |
| Conservative | Dawn Dixon | 380 | 28.4 | −2.2 |
| Independent | Keith Phillips | 123 | 9.2 | +3.6 |
| Green | Alan Marsden | 34 | 2.5 | +2.5 |
| Majority | | 420 | 31.4 | |
| Turnout | | 1,337 | 29.7 | |
| Liberal Democrats hold | | Swing | | |

Kells and Sandwith By-Election 18 December 2008
| Party | Candidate | Votes | % | ±% |
|---|---|---|---|---|
| Labour | Wendy Skillicorn | 434 | 41.7 | −24.1 |
| BNP | Simon Nicholson | 418 | 40.1 | +40.1 |
| Conservative | Brigid Anne Whiteside | 190 | 18.2 | +1.1 |
| Majority | | 16 | 1.5 | −47.1 |
| Turnout | | 1,042 | 26.6 | −26.7 |
| Labour hold | | Swing | | |

=== 2009-2013 ===
Longtown and Bewcastle By-Election 6 May 2010
| Party | Candidate | Votes | % | ±% |
|---|---|---|---|---|
| Conservative | Val Tarbitt | 1,718 | 48.4 | −13.8 |
| Liberal Democrats | Ian Highmore | 1,158 | 32.7 | +32.7 |
| Labour | Helen Horne | 495 | 14.0 | −8.9 |
| BNP | Tony Carvell | 175 | 4.9 | −10.0 |
| Majority | | 560 | 15.8 | |
| Turnout | | 3,546 | | |
| Conservative hold | | Swing | | |

Aspatria and Wharrels By-Election 9 September 2010
| Party | Candidate | Votes | % | ±% |
|---|---|---|---|---|
| Conservative | Mike Johnson | 823 | 70.6 | +13.8 |
| Green | Helen Graham | 342 | 29.4 | +29.4 |
| Majority | | 481 | 41.3 | |
| Turnout | | 1,165 | | |
| Conservative hold | | Swing | | |

Keswick and Derwent By-Election 5 May 2011
| Party | Candidate | Votes | % | ±% |
|---|---|---|---|---|
| Conservative | Ronald Munby | 827 | 32.3 | +0.7 |
| Independent | David Robinson | 650 | 25.4 | +25.4 |
| Liberal Democrats | Martin Pugmire | 619 | 24.2 | −17.8 |
| Labour | Brian Cope | 464 | 18.1 | +2.9 |
| Majority | | 177 | 6.9 | |
| Turnout | | 2,560 | | |
| Conservative gain from Liberal Democrats | | Swing | | |

Castle By-Election 1 March 2012
| Party | Candidate | Votes | % | ±% |
|---|---|---|---|---|
| Labour | Willie Whalen | 407 | 40.9 | +16.9 |
| Liberal Democrats | Olwyn Luckley | 369 | 37.1 | +2.8 |
| Conservative | Keith Meller | 93 | 9.3 | −10.2 |
| UKIP | Michael Owen | 72 | 7.2 | +7.2 |
| Green | Neil Boothman | 54 | 5.4 | +5.4 |
| Majority | | 38 | 3.8 | |
| Turnout | | 995 | | |
| Labour gain from Liberal Democrats | | Swing | | |

Kendal Strickland and Fell By-Election 3 May 2012
| Party | Candidate | Votes | % | ±% |
|---|---|---|---|---|
| Liberal Democrats | John McCreesh | 1,157 | 55.7 | −16.5 |
| Labour | Paul Braithwaite | 542 | 26.1 | +18.9 |
| Conservative | Patrick Birchall | 268 | 12.9 | −4.5 |
| UKIP | Malcolm Nightingale | 110 | 5.3 | +5.3 |
| Majority | | 615 | 29.6 | |
| Turnout | | 2,077 | | |
| Liberal Democrats hold | | Swing | | |

Aspatria and Wharrels By-Election 24 May 2012
| Party | Candidate | Votes | % | ±% |
|---|---|---|---|---|
| Conservative | Jim Lister | 625 | 34.7 | −22.1 |
| Labour | Brian Cope | 520 | 28.9 | +4.1 |
| Independent | Bill Finlay | 390 | 21.7 | +21.7 |
| Liberal Democrats | Phill Roberts | 206 | 11.5 | −6.9 |
| Green | David Bober | 58 | 3.2 | +3.2 |
| Majority | | 105 | 5.8 | |
| Turnout | | 1,799 | | |
| Conservative hold | | Swing | | |

=== 2013-2017 ===
Seaton By-Election 14 November 2013
| Party | Candidate | Votes | % | ±% |
|---|---|---|---|---|
| Labour | Celia Tibble | 628 | 46.8 | +14.8 |
| UKIP | Robert Hardon | 483 | 36.0 | +10.9 |
| Conservative | Mike Davidson | 107 | 8.0 | +3.3 |
| Independent | Tony North | 98 | 7.3 | +7.3 |
| Liberal Democrats | Frank Hollowell | 26 | 1.9 | +1.9 |
| Majority | | 145 | 10.8 | |
| Turnout | | 1,342 | | |
| Labour gain from Independent | | Swing | | |

Belle Vue By-Election 10 April 2014
| Party | Candidate | Votes | % | ±% |
|---|---|---|---|---|
| Labour | Christine Bowditch | 565 | 45.8 | −20.1 |
| Conservative | Nigel Christian | 435 | 35.3 | +1.2 |
| UKIP | John Stayner | 234 | 19.0 | +19.0 |
| Majority | | 130 | 10.5 | |
| Turnout | | 1,234 | | |
| Labour hold | | Swing | | |

Castle By-Election 11 September 2014
| Party | Candidate | Votes | % | ±% |
|---|---|---|---|---|
| Labour | Alan McGuckin | 389 | 37.7 | −2.8 |
| Conservative | James Bainbridge | 245 | 23.7 | +13.1 |
| UKIP | John Stanyer | 235 | 22.8 | +2.8 |
| Liberal Democrats | Lawrence Jennings | 112 | 10.9 | −12.3 |
| Green | Neil Boothman | 51 | 4.9 | +0.9 |
| Majority | | 144 | 14.0 | |
| Turnout | | 1,032 | | |
| Labour hold | | Swing | | |

Windermere By-Election 2 October 2014
| Party | Candidate | Votes | % | ±% |
|---|---|---|---|---|
| Liberal Democrats | Colin Jones | 1,061 | 51.6 | −10.5 |
| Conservative | James Bainbridge | 810 | 39.4 | +20.7 |
| Independent | Robert Judson | 123 | 6.0 | +6.0 |
| Green | Gwen Harrison | 61 | 3.0 | +3.0 |
| Majority | | 251 | 12.2 | |
| Turnout | | 2,055 | | |
| Liberal Democrats hold | | Swing | | |

Walney South By-Election 16 April 2015
| Party | Candidate | Votes | % | ±% |
|---|---|---|---|---|
| Labour | Frank Cassidy | 727 | 63.4 | +2.0 |
| UKIP | Graham Pritchard | 239 | 20.8 | +3.3 |
| Conservative | Greg Peers | 181 | 15.8 | −5.3 |
| Majority | | 488 | 42.5 | |
| Turnout | | 1,147 | | |
| Labour hold | | Swing | | |

Cartmel By-Election 7 May 2015
| Party | Candidate | Votes | % | ±% |
|---|---|---|---|---|
| Liberal Democrats | Sue Sanderson | 1,394 | 46.1 | −21.7 |
| Conservative | Greg Peers | 1,355 | 44.8 | +12.6 |
| Green | Gwen Harrison | 276 | 9.1 | +9.1 |
| Majority | | 39 | 1.3 | |
| Turnout | | 3,025 | | |
| Liberal Democrats hold | | Swing | | |

Greystoke and Hesket By-Election 16 July 2015
| Party | Candidate | Votes | % | ±% |
|---|---|---|---|---|
| Conservative | Thomas Wentworth Waites | 635 | 55.1 | +2.2 |
| Liberal Democrats | Judith Derbyshire | 518 | 44.9 | +22.1 |
| Majority | | 117 | 10.1 | |
| Turnout | | 1,153 | | |
| Conservative hold | | Swing | | |

Howgate By-Election 15 October 2015
| Party | Candidate | Votes | % | ±% |
|---|---|---|---|---|
| Labour | Gillian Troughton | 435 | 47.5 | −13.0 |
| Conservative | Andrew Wonnacott | 304 | 33.2 | +2.3 |
| UKIP | Eric Atkinson | 176 | 19.2 | +19.2 |
| Majority | | 131 | 14.3 | |
| Turnout | | 915 | | |
| Labour hold | | Swing | | |

Kendal Strickland and Fell By-Election 10 March 2016
| Party | Candidate | Votes | % | ±% |
|---|---|---|---|---|
| Liberal Democrats | Peter Thornton | 1,067 | 59.9 | +7.7 |
| Labour | Gillian Troughton | 307 | 17.2 | −9.7 |
| Conservative | Harry Taylor | 172 | 9.7 | −0.5 |
| Green | Andy Mason | 128 | 7.2 | +7.2 |
| UKIP | David Walker | 106 | 6.0 | −3.9 |
| Majority | | 760 | 42.7 | |
| Turnout | | 1,780 | | |
| Liberal Democrats hold | | Swing | | |

Windermere By-Election 13 October 2016
| Party | Candidate | Votes | % | ±% |
|---|---|---|---|---|
| Liberal Democrats | Steve Rooke | 1,009 | 52.3 | +0.7 |
| Conservative | Ben Berry | 785 | 40.7 | +1.3 |
| Labour | Penny Henderson | 88 | 4.6 | +4.6 |
| Green | Kate Threadgold | 46 | 2.4 | −0.6 |
| Majority | | 224 | 11.6 | |
| Turnout | | 1,928 | | |
| Liberal Democrats hold | | Swing | | |

=== 2017-2023 ===
Denton Holme By-Election 6 September 2018
| Party | Candidate | Votes | % | ±% |
|---|---|---|---|---|
| Labour | Karen Lockney | 625 | 59.1 | −0.9 |
| Conservative | Geoffrey Osborne | 292 | 27.6 | +0.6 |
| Green | Helen Davison | 94 | 8.9 | +1.9 |
| UKIP | Phil Douglass | 46 | 4.4 | −1.6 |
| Majority | | 333 | 31.5 | |
| Turnout | | 1,057 | | |
| Labour hold | | Swing | | |

Kent Estuary By-Election 20 December 2018
| Party | Candidate | Votes | % | ±% |
|---|---|---|---|---|
| Liberal Democrats | Phil Douglass | 1,381 | 62.0 | +9.0 |
| Conservative | Tom Harvey | 666 | 29.9 | −7.2 |
| Green | Jill Abel | 109 | 4.9 | −1.1 |
| Labour | Kate Love | 70 | 3.1 | −0.7 |
| Majority | | 715 | 32.1 | |
| Turnout | | 2,226 | | |
| Liberal Democrats hold | | Swing | | |

Thursby By-Election 2 May 2019
| Party | Candidate | Votes | % | ±% |
|---|---|---|---|---|
| Conservative | Tom Harvey | N/A | N/A | N/A |
| Majority | | N/A | N/A | |
| Turnout | | N/A | | |
| Conservative hold | | Swing | | |

Brampton By-Election 6 May 2021
| Party | Candidate | Votes | % | ±% |
|---|---|---|---|---|
| Conservative | Mike Mitchelson | 933 | 56.2 | +0.7 |
| Liberal Democrats | Roger Dobson | 272 | 16.4 | +7.7 |
| Labour | Chris Wills | 246 | 14.8 | −5.9 |
| Green | Joanne Bates | 208 | 12.5 | +4.4 |
| Majority | | 661 | 39.8 | |
| Turnout | | 1,659 | | |
| Conservative hold | | Swing | | |

Cockermouth North By-Election 6 May 2021
| Party | Candidate | Votes | % | ±% |
|---|---|---|---|---|
| Conservative | Catherine Bell | 807 | 41.3 | +11.4 |
| Labour | Alan Smith | 546 | 28.0 | +1.2 |
| Liberal Democrats | Fiona Jayatilaka | 411 | 21.0 | −18.8 |
| Green | Jill Perry | 135 | 6.9 | +3.5 |
| Independent | Nicky Cockburn | 54 | 2.8 | +2.8 |
| Majority | | 261 | 13.4 | |
| Turnout | | 1,953 | | |
| Conservative gain from Liberal Democrats | | Swing | | |

St John's and Great Clifton By-Election 6 May 2021
| Party | Candidate | Votes | % | ±% |
|---|---|---|---|---|
| Conservative | Debbie Garton | 621 | 36.8 | +15.8 |
| Labour | Antony McGuckin | 603 | 35.7 | −0.4 |
| Independent | Paul Scott | 368 | 21.8 | +21.8 |
| Liberal Democrats | Margaret Bennett | 54 | 3.2 | +3.2 |
| Green | Cathy Grout | 41 | 2.4 | −0.6 |
| Majority | | 18 | 1.1 | |
| Turnout | | 1,687 | | |
| Conservative gain from Independent | | Swing | | |

Ulverston West By-Election 6 May 2021
| Party | Candidate | Votes | % | ±% |
|---|---|---|---|---|
| Green | Judy Filmore | 885 | 39.6 | +32.4 |
| Conservative | Andrew Butcher | 869 | 38.9 | −16.1 |
| Labour | David Webster | 380 | 17.0 | −9.5 |
| Liberal Democrats | Loraine Birchall | 102 | 4.6 | −6.7 |
| Majority | | 16 | 0.7 | |
| Turnout | | 2,236 | | |
| Green gain from Conservative | | Swing | | |

Corby and Hayton By-Election 26 August 2021
| Party | Candidate | Votes | % | ±% |
|---|---|---|---|---|
| Liberal Democrats | Roger Dobson | 857 | 71.0 | +60.8 |
| Conservative | Tim Cheetham | 350 | 29.0 | −6.0 |
| Majority | | 507 | 42.0 | |
| Turnout | | 1,207 | | |
| Liberal Democrats gain from Independent | | Swing | | |
