= 1997 Cumbria County Council election =

1997 UK local government election

| ← 1993 | 1 May 1997 | 2001 → |

All 83 seats of Cumbria County Council 42 seats needed for a majority
| | First party | Second party |
|---|---|---|
| Party | Labour | Conservative |
| Last election | 39 seats, 40.1% | 28 seats, 38.9% |
| Seats won | 44 | 22 |
| Seat change | ▲5 | ▼6 |
| Popular vote | 103,969 | 94,524 |
| Percentage | 40.4% | 36.8% |
| Swing | ▲0.3% | ▼2.1% |
| | Third party | Fourth party |
| Party | Liberal Democrats | Independent |
| Last election | 13 seats, 18.0% | 2 seats, 2.2% |
| Seats won | 13 | 4 |
| Seat change | Steady | ▲2 |
| Popular vote | 49,777 | 7,619 |
| Percentage | 19.4% | 3.0% |
| Swing | ▲1.4% | ▲0.8% |
- The County of Cumbria within England
Council control before election
No overall control
Council control after election
Labour Party

Elections to Cumbria County Council were held on 1 May 1997. This was on the same day as other UK county council elections. The Labour Party gained control of the council, which had been under no overall control.

== Results ==
1997 Cumbria County Council election
| Party | Seats | Gains | Losses | Net gain/loss | Seats % | Votes % | Votes | +/− |
|---|---|---|---|---|---|---|---|---|
| Labour | 44 | | | ▲5 | 53.0 | 40.4 | 103,969 | ▲0.3 |
| Conservative | 22 | | | ▼6 | 26.5 | 36.8 | 94,524 | ▼2.1 |
| Liberal Democrats | 13 | | | Steady | 15.7 | 19.4 | 49,777 | ▲1.4 |
| Independent | 4 | | | ▲2 | 4.8 | 3.0 | 7,619 | ▲0.8 |
| Liberal | 0 | | | ▼1 | 0.0 | 0.2 | 551 | ▼0.6 |
| Green | 0 | | | Steady | 0.0 | 0.2 | 517 | New |
| UKIP | 0 | | | Steady | 0.0 | 0.0 | 89 | New |
