= 2005 Cumbria County Council election =

2005 UK local government election

- 5 May 2005

All 84 seats of Cumbria County Council 43 seats needed for a majority
	First party	Second party
Party	Labour	Conservative
Last election	40 seats, 37.5%	33 seats, 39.2%
Seats won	39	32
Seat change	▼1	▼1
Popular vote	84,482	90,794
Percentage	36.1%	38.7%
Swing	▼1.4%	▼0.5%
	Third party	Fourth party
Party	Liberal Democrats	Independent
Last election	10 seats, 17.6%	1 seat, 3.4%
Seats won	11	2
Seat change	▲1	▲1
Popular vote	45,885	11,035
Percentage	19.6%	4.7%
Swing	▲2.0%	▲1.3%
- Map showing the results of the 2005 Cumbria County Council elections.
Council control before election
No overall control
Council control after election
No overall control

Elections to Cumbria County Council were held on 5 May 2005. This was on the same day as other UK county council elections. The Labour Party remained the largest party with the council staying under no overall control.

== Results ==
2005 Cumbria County Council election
Party	Seats	Gains	Losses	Net gain/loss	Seats %	Votes %	Votes	+/−
Labour	39	3	4	▼1	46.4	36.1%	84,482	▼1.4
Conservative	32	3	3	▼1	38.1	38.7%	90,794	▼0.5
Liberal Democrats	11	3	3	▲1	13.1	19.6%	45,885	▲2.0
Independent	2	1	0	▲1	2.4	4.7%	11,035	▲1.3
Socialist People's Party	0	0	0	Steady	0.0	0.4%	826	▲3.0
Green	0	0	0	Steady	0.0	0.2%	499	0.0
UKIP	0	0	0	Steady	0.0	0.1%	312	New
English Democrat	0	0	0	Steady	0.0	0.1%	269	New
Local Community Party	0	0	0	Steady	0.0	0.1%	224	New

== Results by electoral division ==
=== Allerdale District ===
==== Aspatria & Wharrels ====
Aspatria & Wharrels (1 seat)
Party	Candidate	Votes	%
Conservative	James Buchanan	1,609	48.4%
Labour	Carneen McCarron-Holmes	997	30.0%
Liberal Democrats	Eric Burgess	717	21.6%
Majority		612	18.4%
Turnout		3,323	64.1%
Conservative hold			

==== Bowness Thursby & Caldbeck ====
Bowness Thursby & Caldbeck (1 seat)
Party	Candidate	Votes	%
Conservative	Duncan Fairbairn	1,969	62.2%
Liberal Democrats	Olwyn Luckley	1,195	37.8%
Majority		774	24.5%
Turnout		3,164	64.0%
Conservative hold			

==== Cockermouth East ====
Cockermouth East (1 seat)
Party	Candidate	Votes	%
Conservative	Eric Nicholson	1,789	54.9%
Labour	Alan Smith	1,471	45.1%
Majority		318	9.8%
Turnout		3,260	67.4%
Conservative hold			

==== Cockermouth West ====
Cockermouth West (1 seat)
Party	Candidate	Votes	%
Conservative	Timothy Heslop	1,550	55.9%
Labour	William Bacon	1,221	44.1%
Majority		329	11.9%
Turnout		2,771	65.6%
Conservative hold			

==== Dearham and Broughton ====
Dearham and Broughton (1 seat)
Party	Candidate	Votes	%
Labour	Alan Clark	2,031	59.0%
Conservative	Christopher Harris	1,412	41.0%
Majority		619	18.0%
Turnout		3,443	64.9%
Labour hold			

==== Harrington, Clifton and Stainburn ====
Harrington, Clifton and Stainburn (1 seat)
Party	Candidate	Votes	%
Liberal Democrats	Allan Caine	1,603	52.5%
Labour	Joseph Holliday	1,450	47.5%
Majority		153	5.0%
Turnout		3,053	60.3%
Liberal Democrats gain from Labour			

==== Keswick & Derwent ====
Keswick & Derwent (1 seat)
Party	Candidate	Votes	%
Liberal Democrats	Elizabeth Barraclough	1,602	45.6%
Conservative	Ronald Munby	1,099	31.3%
Labour	Denstone Kemp	810	23.1%
Majority		503	14.3%
Turnout		3,511	66.3%
Liberal Democrats gain from Conservative			

==== Maryport East ====
Maryport East (1 seat)
Party	Candidate	Votes	%
Labour	Keith Little	2,044	82.9%
Conservative	Derick Pattinson	421	17.1%
Majority		1,623	65.8%
Turnout		2,465	54.6%
Labour hold			

==== Maryport West ====
Maryport West (1 seat)
Party	Candidate	Votes	%
Labour	William Cameron	1,706	73.5%
Conservative	Neville Lishman	615	26.5%
Majority		1,091	47.0%
Turnout		2,321	58.1%
Labour hold			

==== Moorclose ====
Moss Bay and Moorclose (1 seat)
Party	Candidate	Votes	%
Labour	Gerald Humes	1,358	71.1%
Liberal Democrats	Christine Johanssen	551	28.9%
Majority		807	42.3%
Turnout		1,909	57.4%
Labour hold			

==== Moss Bay ====
Moss Bay (1 seat)
Party	Candidate	Votes	%
Labour	Barbara Cannon	1,172	78.8%
Liberal Democrats	Robert Hardon	316	21.2%
Majority		856	57.5%
Turnout		1,488	49.5%
Labour hold			

==== Seaton ====
Seaton (1 seat)
Party	Candidate	Votes	%
Independent	Trevor Fee	1,202	51.3%
Labour	John Ardron	1,140	48.7%
Majority		62	2.6%
Turnout		2,342	59.1%
Independent gain from Labour			

==== Solway Coast ====
Solway Coast (1 seat)
Party	Candidate	Votes	%
Conservative	Anthony Markley	1,269	40.3%
Labour	Robert Allison	1,127	35.8%
Independent	William Jefferson	749	23.8%
Majority		142	4.5%
Turnout		3,145	63.0%
Conservative gain from Labour			

==== St John's ====
St John's and Great Clifton (1 seat)
Party	Candidate	Votes	%
Labour	James Samson	1,345	57.8%
Conservative	John Heathcote	984	42.2%
Majority		361	15.5%
Turnout		2,329	59.5%
Labour hold			

==== St Michaels ====
St Michael's (1 seat)
Party	Candidate	Votes	%
Labour	Alan Barry	1,282	62.7%
Liberal Democrats	Ian Francis	763	37.3%
Majority		519	25.4%
Turnout		2,045	59.4%
Labour hold			

==== Wigton ====
Wigton (1 seat)
Party	Candidate	Votes	%
Labour	John Crouch	856	32.1%
Conservative	Stuart Moffat	804	33.9%
Independent	George Scott	711	30.0%
Liberal Democrats	Jacqueline Forsyth	299	12.6%
Majority		52	1.9%
Turnout		2,670	56.6%
Labour gain from Conservative			

=== Barrow-in-Furness ===
==== Dalton North ====
Dalton North (1 seat)
Party	Candidate	Votes	%
Labour	Peter Phizacklea	1,495	54.5%
Conservative	William James Crosthwaite	1,246	45.5%
Majority		249	9.1%
Turnout		2,741	58.1%
Labour hold			

==== Dalton South ====
Dalton South (1 seat)
Party	Candidate	Votes	%
Labour	William Smith	1,215	47.7%
Conservative	Frank Murray	985	38.7%
Independent	Helene Young	348	13.7%
Majority		230	9.0%
Turnout		2,548	57.9%
Labour hold			

==== Hawcoat ====
Hawcoat (1 seat)
Party	Candidate	Votes	%
Conservative	John Richardson	1,924	67.3%
Labour	Tricia Kegg	935	32.7%
Majority		989	34.6%
Turnout		2,859	67.9%
Conservative hold			

==== Hindpool ====
Hindpool (1 seat)
Party	Candidate	Votes	%
Conservative	Anne Burns	1,327	73.2%
Labour	John Murray	485	26.8%
Majority		842	46.5%
Turnout		1,812	46.5%
Conservative hold			

==== Newbarns ====
Newbarns (1 seat)
Party	Candidate	Votes	%
Labour	John Murphy	1,106	44.8%
Conservative	William Pears	1,067	43.2%
Independent	James Tongue	295	12.0%
Majority		39	1.6%
Turnout		2,468	60.0%
Labour gain from Conservative			

==== Old Barrow ====
Old Barrow (1 seat)
Party	Candidate	Votes	%
Labour	Clive Kitchen	657	43.4%
Independent	Eric Wood	645	42.6%
Socialist People's Party	Rosemarie Hamezeian	211	13.9%
Majority		12	0.8%
Turnout		1,513	47.9%
Labour hold			

==== Ormsgill ====
Ormsgill (1 seat)
Party	Candidate	Votes	%
Labour	Ernest Wilson	954	49.0%
Socialist People's Party	Jim Hamezeian	615	31.6%
Conservative	Tina Macur	376	19.3%
Majority		339	17.4%
Turnout		1,945	50.8%
Labour hold			

==== Parkside ====
Parkside (1 seat)
Party	Candidate	Votes	%
Labour	Alan Nicholson	1,307	58.9%
Conservative	Shirley Richardson	913	41.1%
Majority		394	17.7%
Turnout		2,220	58.0%
Labour hold			

==== Risedale ====
Risedale (1 seat)
Party	Candidate	Votes	%
Labour	Kevin Hamilton	1,654	71.9%
Conservative	Desmond English	645	28.1%
Majority		1,009	43.9%
Turnout		2,299	49.3%
Labour hold			

==== Roosecote ====
Roosecote (1 seat)
Party	Candidate	Votes	%
Labour	Norman Shaw	1,057	38.5%
Conservative	Kenneth Williams	1,052	38.3%
Liberal Democrats	Alan Titcombe	635	23.1%
Majority		5	0.2%
Turnout		2,744	63.2%
Labour hold			

==== Walney North ====
Walney North (1 seat)
Party	Candidate	Votes	%
Labour	Jane Murphy	1,315	58.6%
Conservative	Brenda Lauderdale	632	28.2%
Independent	Kenneth Arts	298	13.3%
Majority		683	30.4%
Turnout		2,245	54.8%
Labour hold			

==== Walney South ====
Walney South (1 seat)
Party	Candidate	Votes	%
Labour	Jeffrey Garnett	1,211	50.1%
Conservative	Graham Pritchard	786	32.5%
Independent	Stephen Smart	315	13.0%
Independent	Thomas Weall	103	4.3%
Majority		425	17.6%
Turnout		2,415	58.5%
Labour hold			

=== Carlisle ===
==== Belah ====
Belah (1 seat)
Party	Candidate	Votes	%
Conservative	Alan Toole	1,644	53.9%
Labour	Joseph Hendry	1,284	42.1%
Local Community Party	Mark Gibson	124	4.1%
Majority		360	11.8%
Turnout		3,052	63.4%
Conservative hold			

==== Belle Vue ====
Belle Vue (1 seat)
Party	Candidate	Votes	%
Labour	Cyril Weber	1,200	49.7%
Conservative	George Bain	745	30.9%
Liberal Democrats	James Tootle	411	17.0%
Local Community Party	John Peacock	57	2.4%
Majority		455	18.9%
Turnout		2,413	57.4%
Labour hold			

==== Botcherby ====
Botcherby (1 seat)
Party	Candidate	Votes	%
Labour	Anne Glendinning	1,456	71.1%
Conservative	Teresa Cartner	591	28.9%
Majority		865	42.3%
Turnout		2,047	45.5%
Labour hold			

==== Brampton & Gilsland ====
Brampton & Gilsland (1 seat)
Party	Candidate	Votes	%
Conservative	Philip Howard	1,370	47.8%
Labour	Alex Faulds	809	28.2%
Liberal Democrats	Alan Marsden	689	24.0%
Majority		561	19.6%
Turnout		2,868	55.1%
Conservative hold			

==== Castle ====
Castle (1 seat)
Party	Candidate	Votes	%
Liberal Democrats	Thomas Hodgson	937	43.8%
Labour	Jessica Riddle	853	39.9%
Conservative	Pamela Smith	349	16.3%
Majority		84	3.9%
Turnout		2,139	50.6%
Liberal Democrats hold			

==== Currock ====
Corby and Hayton (1 seat)
Party	Candidate	Votes	%
Labour	Heather Bradley	1,414	61.7%
Conservative	Lawrence Fisher	510	22.3%
Liberal Democrats	Marjorie Richardson	366	16.0%
Majority		904	39.5%
Turnout		2,290	52.7%
Labour hold			

==== Dalston & Cummersdale ====
Dalston and Burgh (1 seat)
Party	Candidate	Votes	%
Conservative	John Collier	2,057	50.6%
Labour	Ann Warwick	1,042	25.6%
Liberal Democrats	William Wyllie	968	23.8%
Majority		1,015	25.0%
Turnout		4,067	68.4%
Conservative hold			

==== Denton Holme ====
Denton Holme (1 seat)
Party	Candidate	Votes	%
Labour	Hugh McDevitt	1,587	61.7%
Conservative	Doreen Parsons	543	21.1%
Liberal Democrats	Ronald Struthers	442	17.2%
Majority		1,044	40.6%
Turnout		2,572	55.1%
Labour hold			

==== Harraby ====
Harraby North (1 seat)
Party	Candidate	Votes	%
Labour	Michael Richardson	1,423	56.1%
Conservative	Andrew Stevenson	691	27.2%
Liberal Democrats	Olive Hall	423	16.7%
Majority		732	28.9%
Turnout		2,537	55.1%
Labour hold			

==== Longtown & Bewcastle ====
Longtown & Bewcastle (1 seat)
Party	Candidate	Votes	%
Conservative	Geoffrey Prest	1,417	52.6%
Labour	Robert Dodds	769	28.5%
Liberal Democrats	Jennifer Gallagher	509	18.9%
Majority		648	24.0%
Turnout		2,695	53.1%
Conservative hold			

==== Morton ====
Morton (1 seat)
Party	Candidate	Votes	%
Labour	John Bell	1,540	49.9%
Conservative	John Farmer	1,102	35.7%
Liberal Democrats	John Farmer	404	13.1%
Local Community Party	Lezley Gibson	43	1.4%
Majority		438	14.2%
Turnout		3,089	63.9%
Labour gain from Liberal Democrats			

==== St Aidans ====
St Aidans (1 seat)
Party	Candidate	Votes	%
Labour	Reginald Watson	1,518	63.3%
Conservative	James Bainbridge	880	36.7%
Majority		638	26.6%
Turnout		2,398	53.1%
Labour hold			

==== Stanwix & Irthington ====
Stanwix & Irthington (1 seat)
Party	Candidate	Votes	%
Conservative	John Mallinson	1,760	51.9%
Independent	William Graham	1,632	48.1%
Majority		128	3.8%
Turnout		3,392	66.5%
Conservative hold			

==== Stanwix Urban ====
Stanwix Urban (1 seat)
Party	Candidate	Votes	%
Conservative	Elizabeth Mallinson	1,736	54.1%
Labour	George Stothard	1,475	45.9%
Majority		261	8.1%
Turnout		3,211	66.8%
Conservative hold			

==== Upperby ====
Upperby (1 seat)
Party	Candidate	Votes	%
Labour	Stewart Young	1,297	60.5%
Conservative	Michael Clarke	448	20.9%
Liberal Democrats	James Osler	398	18.6%
Majority		849	39.6%
Turnout		2,143	53.2%
Labour hold			

==== Wetheral ====
Wetheral (1 seat)
Party	Candidate	Votes	%
Conservative	John Robinson	2,206	64.7%
Labour	Roger Horne	1,205	35.3%
Majority		1,001	29.3%
Turnout		3,411	61.3%
Conservative hold			

==== Yewdale ====
Yewdale (1 seat)
Party	Candidate	Votes	%
Labour	Helen Marion Horne	1,890	61.1%
Conservative	Gareth Ellis	1,202	38.9%
Majority		688	22.3%
Turnout		3,092	63.1%
Labour hold			

=== Copeland ===
==== Bransty ====
Bransty (1 seat)
Party	Candidate	Votes	%
Labour	Bernard William Kirk	1,746	64.4%
Conservative	David Hill	964	35.6%
Majority		782	28.9%
Turnout		2,710	55.7%
Labour hold			

==== Cleator Moor North and Frizington ====
Cleator Moor North and Frizington (1 seat)
Party	Candidate	Votes	%
Labour	Timothy Knowles	2,082	71.4%
Conservative	Alexander Carroll	834	28.6%
Majority		1,248	42.8%
Turnout		2,916	55.0%
Labour hold			

==== Cleator Moor South & Egremont ====
Cleator Moor South & Egremont (1 seat)
Party	Candidate	Votes	%
Labour	Simon Leyton	1,990	63.9%
Conservative	Jean Lewthwaite	1,126	36.1%
Majority		864	27.7%
Turnout		3,116	59.8%
Labour hold			

==== Distington & Moresby ====
Distington & Moresby (1 seat)
Party	Candidate	Votes	%
Labour	Archibald Ross	1,522	65.1%
Conservative	George Higgins	817	34.9%
Majority		705	30.1%
Turnout		2,339	55.5%
Labour hold			

==== Gosforth & Ennerdale ====
Gosforth & Ennerdale (1 seat)
Party	Candidate	Votes	%
Conservative	Norman Clarkson	1,467	50.2%
Labour	Peter Watson	897	30.7%
Liberal Democrats	Mike Minogue	561	19.2%
Majority		570	19.5%
Turnout		2,925	68.0%
Conservative hold			

==== Hensingham & Arlecdon ====
Hensingham & Arlecdon (1 seat)
Party	Candidate	Votes	%
Labour	Ronald Calvin	1,712	67.2%
Conservative	Marie Simpson	836	32.8%
Majority		876	34.4%
Turnout		2,548	57.0%
Labour hold			

==== Hillcrest ====
Hillcrest and Hensingham (1 seat)
Party	Candidate	Votes	%
Labour	Judith Andersen	1,237	46.9%
Conservative	Alistair Norwood	984	37.3%
Liberal Democrats	Francis Hollowell	419	15.9%
Majority		253	9.6%
Turnout		2,640	59.7%
Labour hold			

==== Kells and Sandwith ====
Kells and Sandwith (1 seat)
Party	Candidate	Votes	%
Labour	Joseph McAllister	1,367	65.8%
Independent	Gordon Brown	357	17.2%
Conservative	Leah Higgins	355	17.1%
Majority		1,010	48.6%
Turnout		2,079	53.3%
Labour hold			

==== Millom ====
Millom (1 seat)
Party	Candidate	Votes	%
Conservative	Raymond Cole	1,700	50.03%
Labour	Roland Woodward	1,698	49.97%
Majority		2	0.06%
Turnout		3,398	60.2%
Conservative hold			

==== Mirehouse ====
Mirehouse (1 seat)
Party	Candidate	Votes	%
Labour	John Woolley	1,357	74.2%
Conservative	Marcus Swift	473	25.8%
Majority		884	48.3%
Turnout		1,830	51.0%
Labour hold			

==== Seascale & Whicham ====
Seascale & Whicham (1 seat)
Party	Candidate	Votes	%
Conservative	Susan Brown	2,321	71.0%
Labour	Allan Holliday	946	29.0%
Majority		1,375	42.1%
Turnout		67.63,267	%
Conservative hold			

==== St Bees & Egremont ====
St Bees & Egremont (1 seat)
Party	Candidate	Votes	%
Labour	David Southward	1,411	53.9%
Conservative	Adrian Davis-Johnston	940	35.9%
English Democrat	Alan Mossop	269	10.3%
Majority		471	18.0%
Turnout		2,620	60.6%
Labour hold			

=== Eden ===
==== Alston and East Fellside ====
Alston and East Fellside (1 seat)
Party	Candidate	Votes	%
Conservative	Isa Henderson	1,257	35.7%
Independent	Bryan Metz	1,028	29.2%
Liberal Democrats	George Collinge	775	22.0%
Labour	Christopher Bagshaw	463	13.1%
Majority		229	6.5%
Turnout		3,523	71.5%
Conservative hold			

==== Appleby ====
Appleby (1 seat)
Party	Candidate	Votes	%
Conservative	Mary Warburton	1,474	51.0%
Liberal Democrats	Andrew Connell	1,418	49.0%
Majority		56	1.9%
Turnout		2,892	65.2%
Conservative hold			

==== Eden Lakes ====
Eden Lakes (1 seat)
Party	Candidate	Votes	%
Conservative	Roger Bird	1,315	44.8%
Liberal Democrats	Neil Hughes	1,152	39.2%
Independent	Jean Wildish	470	16.0%
Majority		163	5.5%
Turnout		2,937	67.0%
Conservative hold			

==== Greystoke and Hesket ====
Greystoke and Hesket (1 seat)
Party	Candidate	Votes	%
Conservative	Albert Richardson	1,775	54.9%
Liberal Democrats	David Leonard	1,063	32.9%
Independent	Peter Huddleston	395	12.2%
Majority		3,233	68.6%
Turnout		712	22.0%
Conservative hold			

==== Kirkby Stephen ====
Kirkby Stephen (1 seat)
Party	Candidate	Votes	%
Conservative	Timothy Stoddard	1,334	42.4%
Liberal Democrats	John Raw	954	30.3%
Independent	Jane Brook	861	27.3%
Majority		3,149	64.8%
Turnout		380	12.1%
Conservative hold			

==== Penrith East ====
Penrith East (1 seat)
Party	Candidate	Votes	%
Liberal Democrats	Michael Ash	1,129	45.1%
Conservative	Gordon Nicolson	765	30.6%
Labour	Keith Dovaston	467	18.7%
Independent	John Nicholson	141	5.6%
Majority		364	14.5%
Turnout		2,502	55.7%
Liberal Democrats hold			

==== Penrith North ====
Penrith North (1 seat)
Party	Candidate	Votes	%
Conservative	Philip Chappelhow	1,132	39.0%
Liberal Democrats	Andrew Bell	1,034	35.6%
Labour	Geoffrey Rockliffe-King	432	14.9%
Independent	Mary Robinson	304	10.5%
Majority		98	3.4%
Turnout		2,902	63.8%
Conservative hold			

==== Penrith Rural ====
Penrith Rural (1 seat)
Party	Candidate	Votes	%
Conservative	Gary Strong	1,793	57.7%
Liberal Democrats	Stuart Hughes	850	27.4%
Labour	Alison Crompton	464	14.9%
Majority		943	30.4%
Turnout		3,107	69.4%
Conservative hold			

==== Penrith West ====
Penrith West (1 seat)
Party	Candidate	Votes	%
Independent	Colin Nineham	754	33.8%
Conservative	John Thompson	663	29.7%
Liberal Democrats	Roger Burgin	455	20.4%
Labour	Eric Wilson	360	16.1%
Majority		91	4.1%
Turnout		2,232	54.3%
Independent hold			

=== South Lakeland ===
==== Cartmel ====
Cartmel (1 seat)
Party	Candidate	Votes	%
Conservative	Edward Walsh	1,332	44.3%
Liberal Democrats	David Birchall	1,302	43.3%
Labour	Marilyn Molloy	374	12.4%
Majority		30	1.0%
Turnout		3,008	68.3%
Conservative gain from Liberal Democrats			

==== Grange ====
Grange (1 seat)
Party	Candidate	Votes	%
Conservative	William Wearing	1,973	53.7%
Liberal Democrats	Jane Hall	1,374	37.4%
Labour	Laurence Scullard	328	8.9%
Majority		599	16.3%
Turnout		3,675	74.0%
Conservative hold			

==== High Furness ====
High Furness (1 seat)
Party	Candidate	Votes	%
Conservative	Oliver Pearson	1,426	46.7%
Liberal Democrats	Edward Davies	1,265	41.5%
Labour	Rae Cross	360	11.8%
Majority		161	5.3%
Turnout		3,051	71.8%
Conservative hold			

==== Kendal Castle ====
Kendal Castle (1 seat)
Party	Candidate	Votes	%
Liberal Democrats	Thomas Clare	1,941	57.6%
Conservative	Enid Robinson	1,034	30.7%
Labour	Charles Batteson	395	11.7%
Majority		907	26.9%
Turnout		3,370	71.2%
Liberal Democrats hold			

==== Kendal Highgate ====
Kendal Highgate (1 seat)
Party	Candidate	Votes	%
Liberal Democrats	Geoffrey Cook	1,167	43.6%
Labour	Martyn Jowett	900	33.6%
Conservative	Jaine Chisholm Caunt	611	22.8%
Majority		267	10.0%
Turnout		2,678	62.5%
Liberal Democrats gain from Labour			

==== Kendal Nether ====
Kendal Nether (1 seat)
Party	Candidate	Votes	%
Liberal Democrats	Leslie Lishman	1,506	48.9%
Labour	Paul Braithwaite	791	25.7%
Conservative	Karen Patrick	781	25.4%
Majority		715	23.2%
Turnout		3,078	66.0%
Liberal Democrats hold			

==== Kendal South ====
Kendal South (1 seat)
Party	Candidate	Votes	%
Conservative	Alan Bobbett	1,480	42.2%
Liberal Democrats	Graham Vincent	1,443	41.2%
Labour	Robert Rothwell	478	13.6%
Independent	Andrew Billson-Page	103	2.9%
Majority		37	1.1%
Turnout		3,504	73.8%
Conservative hold			

==== Kendal Strickland and Fell ====
Kendal Strickland and Fell (1 seat)
Party	Candidate	Votes	%
Labour	David Clarke	1,434	45.3%
Liberal Democrats	Stephen Coleman	1,149	36.3%
Conservative	Melvin Mackie	582	18.4%
Majority		285	9.0%
Turnout		3,165	68.5%
Labour hold			

==== Kent Estuary ====
Kent Estuary (1 seat)
Party	Candidate	Votes	%
Liberal Democrats	Ian Stewart	2,038	52.5%
Conservative	Andrew Coates	1,526	39.3%
Labour	Andrew Strang	319	8.2%
Majority		512	13.2%
Turnout		3,883	75.0%
Liberal Democrats hold			

==== Lakes ====
Lakes (1 seat)
Party	Candidate	Votes	%
Conservative	Brian Barton	1,025	40.5%
Liberal Democrats	Mandi Abrahams	908	35.9%
Independent	George Middleton	324	12.8%
Labour	Maureen Colquhoun	275	10.9%
Majority		117	4.6%
Turnout		2,532	61.0%
Conservative gain from Liberal Democrats			

==== Low Furness ====
Lower Kentdale (1 seat)
Party	Candidate	Votes	%
Conservative	John Hemingway	1,636	53.4%
Liberal Democrats	David Steel	1,425	46.6%
Majority		211	6.9%
Turnout		3,061	65.2%
Conservative hold			

==== Lower Kentdale ====
Lyth Valley (1 seat)
Party	Candidate	Votes	%
Conservative	Roger Bingham	2,209	64.5%
Liberal Democrats	Antony Jolley	925	27.0%
Labour	Peter Horner	292	8.5%
Majority		1,284	37.5%
Turnout		3,426	74.3%
Conservative hold			

==== Lyth Valley ====
Lyth Valley (1 seat)
Party	Candidate	Votes	%
Conservative	James Bland	1,745	58.1%
Liberal Democrats	Maureen Horner	1,048	34.9%
Labour	Robin Yates	212	7.1%
Majority		697	23.2%
Turnout		3,005	73.0%
Conservative hold			

==== Sedbergh and Kirkby Lonsdale ====
Sedbergh and Kirkby Lonsdale (1 seat)
Party	Candidate	Votes	%
Conservative	Joseph Nicholson	1,914	57.1%
Liberal Democrats	Sydney McLennan	1,150	34.3%
Labour	Diane Horner	289	8.6%
Majority		764	22.8%
Turnout		3,353	71.5%
Conservative hold			

==== Ulverston East ====
Ulverston East (1 seat)
Party	Candidate	Votes	%
Labour	Wendy Kolbe	1,397	55.2%
Conservative	Brian Wilkinson	823	32.5%
UKIP	Alan Beach	312	12.3%
Majority		574	22.7%
Turnout		2,532	57.5%
Labour hold			

==== Ulverston West ====
Ulverston West (1 seat)
Party	Candidate	Votes	%
Conservative	Pauline Halfpenny	1,682	54.7%
Labour	Bharath Rajan	896	29.1%
Green	Simon Filmore	499	16.2%
Majority		786	25.5%
Turnout		3,077	69.3%
Conservative hold			

==== Upper Kent ====
Upper Kent (1 seat)
Party	Candidate	Votes	%
Liberal Democrats	Stanley Collins	1,755	54.5%
Conservative	Patricia Bell	1,189	36.9%
Labour	Avril Dobson	277	8.6%
Majority		566	17.6%
Turnout		3,221	72.5%
Liberal Democrats hold			

==== Windermere ====
Windermere (1 seat)
Party	Candidate	Votes	%
Liberal Democrats	Joan Stocker	1,858	55.0%
Conservative	David Williams	1,211	35.8%
Labour	Yvonne Stewart-Taylor	309	9.1%
Majority		647	19.2%
Turnout		3,378	69.2%
Liberal Democrats hold			
