= 1985 Cumbria County Council election =

1985 UK local government election

← 1981	2 May 1985	1989 →

All 83 seats of Cumbria County Council 42 seats needed for a majority
	First party	Second party
Party	Labour	Conservative
Last election	42 seats, 49.0%	35 seats, 40.4%
Seats won	39	36
Seat change	▼3	▲1
Popular vote	59,045	55,398
Percentage	41.5%	38.9%
Swing	▼7.5%	▲3.0%
	Third party	Fourth party
Party	Alliance	Independent
Last election	3 seats, 8.6%	3 seats, 1.5%
Seats won	5	3
Seat change	▲2	0
Popular vote	21,928	4,975
Percentage	15.4%	3.5%
Swing	▲6.8%	▲2.0%
- The County of Cumbria within England
Council control before election
Labour Party
Council control after election
No overall control

Elections to Cumbria County Council were held on 2 May 1985. This was on the same day as other UK county council elections. The whole council of 83 members was up for election and the Labour Party lost control of the council, which fell under no overall control.

== Results ==
1985 Cumbria County Council election
Party	Seats	Gains	Losses	Net gain/loss	Seats %	Votes %	Votes	+/−
Labour	39			▼3	47.0	41.5	59,045	▼7.5
Conservative	36			▲1	43.4	38.9	55,398	▲3.0
Alliance	5			▲2	6.0	15.4	21,928	▲6.8
Independent	3			0	3.6	3.5	4,975	▲2.0
Ecology	0			0	0.0	0.5	704	0.0
Independent Labour	0			0	0.0	0.3	389	New
