= 1973 Cumbria County Council election =

1973 UK local government election

12 April 1973	1977 →

All 82 seats of Cumbria County Council 42 seats needed for a majority
	First party	Second party
Party	Labour	Conservative
Seats won	38	31
Popular vote	62,155	59,912
Percentage	41.0%	39.5%
	Third party	Fourth party
Party	Independent	Liberal
Seats won	12	1
Popular vote	24,059	5,392
Percentage	15.9%	3.6%
- The County of Cumbria within England
Council control after election
No overall control

Elections to Cumbria County Council were held on 12 April 1973. This was on the same day as other UK county council elections. The whole council of 82 members was up for election and the council fell under no overall control.

The election was the first to take place to the new non-metropolitan county council of Cumbria as defined by the Local Government Act 1972, which had reformed local government in England and Wales. The council acted as a "shadow authority" until 1 April 1974, when it gained control from its predecessor county councils, Cumberland, Westmorland County Council, and parts of Lancashire and the West Riding of Yorkshire.

== Results ==
1973 Cumbria County Council election
Party	Seats	Gains	Losses	Net gain/loss	Seats %	Votes %	Votes	+/−
Labour	38				46.3	41.0	62,155	
Conservative	31				37.8	39.5	59,912	
Independent	12				14.6	15.9	24,059	
Liberal	1				1.2	3.6	5,392	
Ind. Conservative	0				0.0	0.1	139	
