= 1977 Cumbria County Council election =

1977 English local election

← 1973	5 May 1977	1981 →

All 82 seats of Cumbria County Council 42 seats needed for a majority
	First party	Second party	Third party
Party	Conservative	Labour	Independent
Last election	31 seats, 39.5%	38 seats, 41.0%	12 seats, 15.9%
Seats won	52	23	7
Seat change	▲21	▼15	▼5
Popular vote	76,439	53,892	13,506
Percentage	52.1%	36.7%	9.2%
Swing	▲12.6%	▼4.3%	▼6.9%
- The County of Cumbria within England
Council control before election
No overall control
Council control after election
Conservative Party

Elections to Cumbria County Council were held on 5 May 1977. This was on the same day as other UK county council elections. The whole council of 82 members was up for election and the Conservative Party gained control of the council, which had previously been under no overall control.

== Results ==
1977 Cumbria County Council election
Party	Seats	Gains	Losses	Net gain/loss	Seats %	Votes %	Votes	+/−
Conservative	52			▲21	63.4	52.1	76,439	▲12.6
Labour	23			▼15	28.0	36.7	53,892	▼4.3
Independent	7			▼5	8.5	9.2	13,506	▼6.9
Liberal	0			▼1	0.0	2.0	2,927	▼1.6
