= 1989 Cumbria County Council election =

1989 UK local government election

← 1985	4 May 1989	1993 →

All 83 seats of Cumbria County Council 42 seats needed for a majority
	First party	Second party
Party	Labour	Conservative
Last election	39 seats, 41.5%	36 seats, 38.9%
Seats won	37	37
Seat change	▼2	▲1
Popular vote	59,863	59,671
Percentage	42.3%	42.1%
Swing	▲0.8%	▲3.2%
	Third party	Fourth party
Party	SLD	Independent
Last election	5 seats, 15.4%	3 seats, 3.5%
Seats won	6	3
Seat change	▲1	Steady
Popular vote	15,278	6,623
Percentage	10.8%	4.7%
Swing	▼4.6%	▲1.2%
- The County of Cumbria within England
Council control before election
No overall control
Council control after election
No overall control

Elections to Cumbria County Council were held on 4 May 1989. This was on the same day as other UK county council elections. The whole council of 83 members was up for election and the council remained under no overall control.

== Results ==
1989 Cumbria County Council election
Party	Seats	Gains	Losses	Net gain/loss	Seats %	Votes %	Votes	+/−
Labour	37			▼2	44.6	42.3	59,863	▲0.8
Conservative	37			▲1	44.6	42.1	59,671	▲3.2
SLD	6			▲1	7.2	10.8	15,278	▼4.6
Independent	3			Steady	3.6	4.7	6,623	▲1.2
Green	0			Steady	0.0	0.1	152	▼0.4
