= 1981 Cumbria County Council election =

1981 UK local government election

← 1977	7 May 1981	1985 →

All 83 seats of Cumbria County Council 42 seats needed for a majority
	First party	Second party
Party	Labour	Conservative
Last election	23 seats, 36.7%	52 seats, 52.1%
Seats won	42	35
Seat change	▲19	▼17
Popular vote	74,286	61,242
Percentage	49.0%	40.4%
Swing	▲12.3%	▼11.7%
	Third party	Fourth party
Party	Liberal	Independent
Last election	0 seats, 2.0%	7 seats, 9.2%
Seats won	3	3
Seat change	▲3	▼4
Popular vote	13,053	2,242
Percentage	8.6%	1.5%
Swing	▲6.6%	▼7.7%
- The County of Cumbria within England
Council control before election
Conservative Party
Council control after election
Labour Party

Elections to Cumbria County Council were held on 7 May 1981. This was on the same day as other UK county council elections. The council size was increased to 83 members following a boundary review. The Labour Party gained control of the council from the Conservative Party.

== Results ==
1981 Cumbria County Council election
Party	Seats	Gains	Losses	Net gain/loss	Seats %	Votes %	Votes	+/−
Labour	42			▲19	50.6	49.0	74,286	▲12.3
Conservative	35			▼17	42.2	40.4	61,242	▼11.7
Liberal	3			▲3	3.6	8.6	13,053	▲6.6
Independent	3			▼4	3.6	1.5	2,242	▼7.7
Ecology	0			Steady	0.0	0.5	683	New
PARA	0			Steady	0.0	0.1	134	New
National Front	0			Steady	0.0	0.0	59	New
