= 1993 Cumbria County Council election =

1993 UK local government election

← 1989	6 May 1993	1997 →

All 83 seats of Cumbria County Council 42 seats needed for a majority
	First party	Second party	Third party
Party	Labour	Conservative	Liberal Democrats
Last election	37 seats, 42.3%	37 seats, 42.1%	6 seats, 10.8%
Seats won	39	28	13
Seat change	▲2	▼9	▲7
Popular vote	53,100	51,543	23,790
Percentage	40.1%	38.9%	18.0%
Swing	▼2.2%	▼3.2%	▲7.2%
	Fourth party	Fifth party
Party	Independent	Liberal
Last election	3 seats, 4.7%	Did not stand
Seats won	2	1
Seat change	▼1	▲1
Popular vote	2,911	1,101
Percentage	2.2%	0.8%
Swing	▼2.5%	N/A
- The County of Cumbria within England
Council control before election
No overall control
Council control after election
No overall control

Elections to Cumbria County Council were held on 6 May 1993. This was on the same day as other UK county council elections. The whole council of 83 members was up for election and the council remained under no overall control.

== Results ==
1993 Cumbria County Council election
Party	Seats	Gains	Losses	Net gain/loss	Seats %	Votes %	Votes	+/−
Labour	39			▲2	47.0	40.1	53,100	▼2.2
Conservative	28			▼9	33.7	38.9	51,543	▼3.2
Liberal Democrats	13			▲7	15.7	18.0	23,790	▲7.2
Independent	2			▼1	2.4	2.2	2,911	▼2.5
Liberal	1			▲1	1.2	0.8	1,101	New
