= 2001 Cumbria County Council election =

2001 UK local government election

- 7 June 2001

All 84 seats of Cumbria County Council 43 seats needed for a majority
	First party	Second party
Party	Labour	Conservative
Last election	44 seats, 40.4%	22 seats, 36.8%
Seats won	40	33
Seat change	▼4	▲11
Popular vote	90,011	93,931
Percentage	37.5%	39.2%
Swing	▼2.9%	▲2.4%
	Third party	Fourth party
Party	Liberal Democrats	Independent
Last election	13 seats, 19.4%	4 seats, 3.0%
Seats won	10	1
Seat change	▼3	▼3
Popular vote	42,137	8,245
Percentage	17.6%	3.4%
Swing	▼1.8%	▲0.4%
- Map showing the results of the 2001 Cumbria County Council elections.
Council control before election
Labour Party
Council control after election
No overall control

Elections to Cumbria County Council were held on 7 June 2001. This was on the same day as other UK county council elections. The Labour Party lost control of the council, and was now under no overall control.

== Results ==
2001 Cumbria County Council election
Party	Seats	Gains	Losses	Net gain/loss	Seats %	Votes %	Votes	+/−
Labour	40			▼4	47.6	37.5	90,011	▼2.9
Conservative	33			▲11	39.3	39.2	93,931	▲2.4
Liberal Democrats	10			▼3	11.9	17.6	42,137	▼1.8
Independent	1			▼3	1.2	3.4	8,245	▲0.4
Socialist People's Party	0			Steady	0.0	1.7	4,194	New
Liberal	0			Steady	0.0	0.3	748	▲0.1
Green	0			Steady	0.0	0.2	363	0.0
Legalise Cannabis	0			Steady	0.0	0.1	286	New

== Results by electoral division ==
=== Allerdale ===
==== Aspatria & Wharrels ====
Aspatria & Wharrels (1 seat)
Party	Candidate	Votes	%
Conservative	Kathleen Elizabeth Brandwood	1,467	42.6%
Labour	Colin Harold Ainsworth	1,447	42.1%
Liberal Democrats	Charles Arthur Alfred Miles	527	15.3%
Turnout		3,441	65.3%
Conservative win (new seat)			

==== Bowness Thursby & Caldbeck ====
Bowness Thursby & Caldbeck (1 seat)
Party	Candidate	Votes	%
Conservative	Duncan Stewart Fairbairn	1,916	56.3%
Liberal Democrats	Agnes Mary Martin	865	25.4%
Labour	Gordon Hanning	623	18.3%
Turnout		3,404	66.9%
Conservative win (new seat)			

==== Cockermouth East ====
Cockermouth East (1 seat)
Party	Candidate	Votes	%
Conservative	Eric William Nicholson	1,706	49.8%
Labour	Martin Trevor Mundahl Harris	1,131	33.0%
Liberal Democrats	Margaret Patricia Burgess	588	17.2%
Turnout		3,425	67.3%
Conservative win (new seat)			

==== Cockermouth West ====
Cockermouth West (1 seat)
Party	Candidate	Votes	%
Conservative	Timothy Heslop	1,223	46.6%
Labour	Isabel Jeanette Burns	959	36.5%
Liberal Democrats	John Morley	442	16.8%
Turnout		2,624	63.9%
Conservative win (new seat)			

==== Dearham and Broughton ====
Dearham and Broughton (1 seat)
Party	Candidate	Votes	%
Labour	Alan Clark	2,245	62.6%
Conservative	Maureen Betty Wood	1,342	37.4%
Turnout		3,587	65.6%
Labour win (new seat)			

==== Harrington ====
Harrington (1 seat)
Party	Candidate	Votes	%
Labour	Joseph Simon Holliday	1,723	53.8%
Liberal Democrats	Ian William Francis	1,480	46.2%
Turnout		3,203	62.2%
Labour win (new seat)			

==== Keswick & Derwent ====
Keswick & Derwent (1 seat)
Party	Candidate	Votes	%
Conservative	Stanley Hinde	1,503	40.2%
Liberal Democrats	Elizabeth Dick Barraclough	1,229	32.8%
Labour	Denstone John Thornton Kemp	1,010	27.0%
Turnout		3,742	63.6%
Conservative win (new seat)			

==== Maryport East ====
Maryport East (1 seat)
Party	Candidate	Votes	%
Labour	Derek Holmes	2,384	83.0%
Conservative	James Lawson	487	17.0%
Turnout		2,871	58.2%
Labour win (new seat)			

==== Maryport West ====
Maryport West (1 seat)
Party	Candidate	Votes	%
Labour	William Cameron	1,830	66.2%
Independent	Michael John Innes Bird	612	22.1%
Conservative	Helene Ann Hargreaves	323	11.7%
Turnout		2,765	62.3%
Labour win (new seat)			

==== Moorclose ====
Moorclose (1 seat)
Party	Candidate	Votes	%
Labour	Gerald Humes	1,547	67.7%
Liberal Democrats	Allan Caine	737	32.3%
Turnout		2,284	58.9%
Labour win (new seat)			

==== Moss Bay ====
Moss Bay (1 seat)
Party	Candidate	Votes	%
Labour	Barbara Ann Cannon	1,555	80.0%
Liberal Democrats	Christine Johansson	389	20.0%
Turnout		1,944	54.0%
Labour win (new seat)			

==== Seaton ====
Seaton (1 seat)
Party	Candidate	Votes	%
Labour	Nicholas John Findley	1,716	71.0%
Conservative	William Derwent Newton	701	29.0%
Turnout		2,417	59.2%
Labour win (new seat)			

==== Solway Coast ====
Solway Coast (1 seat)
Party	Candidate	Votes	%
Labour	Robert William Allison	1,208	37.4%
Conservative	Anthony James Markley	1,162	36.0%
Independent	William Hayton Jefferson	739	22.9%
Legalise Cannabis	John Peacock	121	3.7%
Turnout		3,230	62.3%
Labour win (new seat)			

==== St John's ====
St John's (1 seat)
Party	Candidate	Votes	%
Labour	James Stewart Samson	1,633	60.2%
Conservative	Robert Gibson Hardon	1,081	39.8%
Turnout		2,714	62.1%
Labour win (new seat)			

==== St Michaels ====
St Michae's (1 seat)
Party	Candidate	Votes	%
Labour	Tracy Dawn Stainton	1,897	75.1%
Conservative	Kenneth Reid Steel	386	15.3%
Liberal Democrats	Mark Frederick Joseph Hayton	244	9.7%
Turnout		2,527	61.6%
Labour win (new seat)			

==== Wigton ====
Wigton (1 seat)
Party	Candidate	Votes	%
Conservative	Robert Seivewright Johnstone Edgar	1,457	53.1%
Labour	William Peter Walton	756	27.6%
Liberal Democrats	Anne Holmes	531	19.4%
Turnout			%
Conservative win (new seat)			

=== Barrow-in-Furness ===
==== Dalton North ====
Dalton North (1 seat)
Party	Candidate	Votes	%
Labour	Peter Phizacklea	1,417	50.5%
Conservative	William James Crosthwaite	987	35.2%
Socialist People's Party	Thomas Weall	400	14.3%
Turnout		2,804	59.7%
Labour win (new seat)			

==== Dalton South ====
Dalton South (1 seat)
Party	Candidate	Votes	%
Labour	William Smith	1,327	50.3%
Conservative	Alan Rothery	948	35.9%
Independent	Helene Young	188	7.1%
Socialist People's Party	Dorothy Rita Turner	177	6.7%
Turnout		2,640	57.3%
Labour win (new seat)			

==== Hawcoat ====
Hawcoat (1 seat)
Party	Candidate	Votes	%
Conservative	John Robert Richardson	1,774	60.9%
Labour	Rebecca Jane Melling	908	31.2%
Socialist People's Party	Margaret Ann Arts	231	7.9%
Turnout		2,913	65.9%
Conservative win (new seat)			

==== Hindpool ====
Hindpool (1 seat)
Party	Candidate	Votes	%
Labour	Anne Burns	1,421	63.0%
Socialist People's Party	Rosemarie Hamezeian	450	20.0%
Conservative	Daniel Christopher Edwards	384	17.0%
Turnout		2,255	49.4%
Labour win (new seat)			

==== Newbarns ====
Newbarns (1 seat)
Party	Candidate	Votes	%
Conservative	William Pears	1,264	46.7%
Labour	Jeffrey Harold Garnett	1,207	44.6%
Socialist People's Party	Norman Sidney Graham	237	8.8%
Turnout		2,708	61.8%
Conservative win (new seat)			

==== Old Barrow ====
Old Barrow (1 seat)
Party	Candidate	Votes	%
Labour	Michael Anthony Hubbold	1,018	54.4%
Socialist People's Party	Eric James Wood	612	32.7%
Conservative	William Francis Palmer	241	12.9%
Turnout		1,871	50.5%
Labour win (new seat)			

==== Ormsgill ====
Ormsgill (1 seat)
Party	Candidate	Votes	%
Labour	Ernest Roland Wilson	1,153	51.5%
Socialist People's Party	Jim Hamezeian	719	32.1%
Conservative	Kristina Louise Bell	367	16.4%
Turnout		2,239	54.8%
Labour win (new seat)			

==== Parkside ====
Parkside (1 seat)
Party	Candidate	Votes	%
Labour	Alan David Nicholson	1,392	55.7%
Conservative	Tina Macur	830	33.2%
Socialist People's Party	Kenneth Arts	279	11.2%
Turnout		2,501	59.6%
Labour win (new seat)			

==== Risedale ====
Risedale (1 seat)
Party	Candidate	Votes	%
Labour	Kevin Robert Hamilton	1,785	65.1%
Conservative	Desmond English	517	18.8%
Socialist People's Party	Alexander John Dacre	442	16.1%
Turnout		2,744	52.9%
Labour win (new seat)			

==== Roosecote ====
Roosecote (1 seat)
Party	Candidate	Votes	%
Labour	Norman Maurice Shaw	1,361	52.5%
Conservative	John William Joughin	1,232	47.5%
Turnout		2,593	62.5%
Labour win (new seat)			

==== Walney North ====
Walney North (1 seat)
Party	Candidate	Votes	%
Labour	Jane Amelia Murphy	1,622	65.3%
Conservative	Shirley Richardson	564	22.7%
Socialist People's Party	William David Tucker	298	12.0%
Turnout		2,484	58.5%
Labour win (new seat)			

==== Walney South ====
Walney South (1 seat)
Party	Candidate	Votes	%
Labour	Alfred Malcolm Horne	1,631	61.9%
Conservative	David Roberts	655	24.9%
Socialist People's Party	Deborah Morris	349	13.2%
Turnout		2,635	59.6%
Labour win (new seat)			

=== Carlisle ===
==== Belah ====
Belah (1 seat)
Party	Candidate	Votes	%
Conservative	Alan Toole	1,731	55.5%
Labour	Joseph Norman David Weedall	1,387	44.5%
Turnout		3,118	64.9%
Conservative win (new seat)			

==== Belle Vue ====
Belle Vue (1 seat)
Party	Candidate	Votes	%
Labour	Cyril Frederick Weber	1,172	50.3%
Conservative	George Arthur Taylor Bain	802	34.4%
Liberal Democrats	George Robinson	358	15.4%
Turnout		2,332	54.5%
Labour win (new seat)			

==== Botcherby ====
Botcherby (1 seat)
Party	Candidate	Votes	%
Labour	Anne Glendinning	1,361	60.2%
Conservative	Gareth Michael Ellis	581	25.7%
Liberal Democrats	John Martin	320	14.1%
Turnout		2,262	50.4%
Labour win (new seat)			

==== Brampton & Gilsland ====
Brampton & Gilsland (1 seat)
Party	Candidate	Votes	%
Conservative	Kevan Wilkinson	1,875	60.2%
Labour	John Christopher Hale	1,241	39.8%
Turnout		3,116	61.8%
Conservative win (new seat)			

==== Castle ====
Castle (1 seat)
Party	Candidate	Votes	%
Liberal Democrats	Ralph Elliot Aldersey	994	44.6%
Labour	Peter Bradley	786	35.3%
Conservative	Charlotte Anne Fisher	448	20.1%
Turnout			51.4%
Liberal Democrats win (new seat)			

==== Currock ====
Currock (1 seat)
Party	Candidate	Votes	%
Labour	Brian Hall	1,469	61.9%
Conservative	Judith Lorraine Pattinson	611	25.7%
Liberal Democrats	John Michael Guest	294	12.4%
Turnout		2,374	54.9%
Labour win (new seat)			

==== Dalston & Cummersdale ====
Dalston & Cummersdale (1 seat)
Party	Candidate	Votes	%
Conservative	John Richard Collier	1,982	56.1%
Labour	Raymond Warwick	822	23.3%
Liberal Democrats	David McMillan	562	15.9%
Green	Peter Strong	167	4.7%
Turnout		3,533	66.8%
Conservative win (new seat)			

==== Denton Holme ====
Denton Holme (1 seat)
Party	Candidate	Votes	%
Labour	Christopher John Southward	1,423	59.7%
Conservative	Andrew John Stevenson	619	26.0%
Liberal Democrats	Eileen Aldersey	341	14.3%
Turnout		2,383	53.3%
Labour win (new seat)			

==== Harraby ====
Harraby (1 seat)
Party	Candidate	Votes	%
Labour	Michael Louis Richardson	1,596	62.8%
Conservative	Michele Dawn Gwillim	946	37.2%
Turnout		2,542	55.9%
Labour win (new seat)			

==== Longtown & Bewcastle ====
Longtown & Bewcastle (1 seat)
Party	Candidate	Votes	%
Conservative	John Donald Jefferson	1,864	62.0%
Labour	Robert Dodds	772	25.7%
Liberal Democrats	Raymond Langstone	369	12.3%
Turnout		3,005	61.3%
Conservative win (new seat)			

==== Morton ====
Morton (1 seat)
Party	Candidate	Votes	%
Liberal Democrats	John Peter Farmer	1,342	43.9%
Conservative	Anne Quilter	1,224	40.1%
Labour	Donald Norman Joscelyne	488	16.0%
Turnout		3,054	62.2%
Liberal Democrats win (new seat)			

==== St Aidans ====
St Aidans (1 seat)
Party	Candidate	Votes	%
Labour	Reginald Watson	1,284	49.1%
Conservative	Anthony Richard Fontes	933	35.7%
Liberal Democrats	Judith Edmondson	399	15.3%
Turnout		2,616	57.8%
Labour win (new seat)			

==== Stanwix & Irthington ====
Stanwix & Irthington (1 seat)
Party	Candidate	Votes	%
Conservative	John Mallinson	1,670	52.3%
Independent	William James Graham	1,521	47.7%
Turnout			65.9%
Conservative win (new seat)			

==== Stanwix Urban ====
Stanwix Urban (1 seat)
Party	Candidate	Votes	%
Conservative	Elizabeth Anne Mallinson	1,810	57.2%
Labour	Keith Aitken	1,355	42.8%
Turnout		3,165	67.7%
Conservative win (new seat)			

==== Upperby ====
Upperby (1 seat)
Party	Candidate	Votes	%
Labour	Stewart Farries Young	1,565	70.6%
Conservative	Jean Watson	653	29.4%
Turnout		2,218	53.3%
Labour win (new seat)			

==== Wetheral ====
Wetheral (1 seat)
Party	Candidate	Votes	%
Conservative	John Robert Dalton Robinson	2,255	66.3%
Labour	Roger Nicholson Horne	1,146	33.7%
Turnout		3,401	66.8%
Conservative win (new seat)			

==== Yewdale ====
Yewdale (1 seat)
Party	Candidate	Votes	%
Labour	Helen Marion Horne	1,453	49.7%
Conservative	Bryan Hodgson	1,068	36.5%
Liberal Democrats	Thomas Geoffrey Hodgson	404	13.8%
Turnout		2,925	61.5%
Labour win (new seat)			

=== Copeland ===
==== Bransty ====
Bransty (1 seat)
Party	Candidate	Votes	%
Labour	Bernard William Kirk	1,694	59.3%
Conservative	Mary Simon	1,164	40.7%
Turnout		2,858	62.7%
Labour win (new seat)			

==== Cleator Moor North and Frizington ====
Cleator Moor North and Frizington (1 seat)
Party	Candidate	Votes	%
Labour	Timothy John Knowles	2,014	65.7%
Conservative	Hilda Joyce Morris	659	21.5%
Liberal Democrats	Mike Minogue	392	12.8%
Turnout		3,065	59.5%
Labour win (new seat)			

==== Cleator Moor South & Egremont ====
Cleator Moor South & Egremont (1 seat)
Party	Candidate	Votes	%
Labour	Simon Arthur John Leyton	2,102	61.5%
Conservative	Doreen Platt	897	26.3%
Liberal Democrats	Gabrielle Maureen Minogue	418	12.2%
Turnout		3,417	65.2%
Labour win (new seat)			

==== Distington & Moresby ====
Distington & Moresby (1 seat)
Party	Candidate	Votes	%
Labour	Archibald Campbell Ross	1,417	55.8%
Conservative	Leah Higgins	718	28.3%
Liberal Democrats	Francis Graeme Hollowell	406	16.0%
Turnout		2,541	61.3%
Labour win (new seat)			

==== Gosforth & Ennerdale ====
Gosforth & Ennerdale (1 seat)
Party	Candidate	Votes	%
Conservative	Ashton Reginald Marson Toft	1,641	55.6%
Labour	Christina Margaret Cornall	788	26.7%
Liberal Democrats	Lucille Eleanor Dunn	525	17.8%
Turnout		2,954	68.9%
Conservative win (new seat)			

==== Hensingham & Arlecdon ====
Hensingham & Arlecdon (1 seat)
Party	Candidate	Votes	%
Labour	Ronald Calvin	1,879	68.4%
Conservative	Gareth Richard Charles Maley	870	31.6%
Turnout		2,749	61.3%
Labour win (new seat)			

==== Hillcrest and Hensingham ====
Hillcrest and Hensingham (1 seat)
Party	Candidate	Votes	%
Labour	Judith Andersen	1,489	54.2%
Conservative	Dorothy Anne Wonnacott	1,256	45.8%
Turnout		2,745	63.3%
Labour win (new seat)			

==== Kells and Sandwith ====
Kells and Sandwith (1 seat)
Party	Candidate	Votes	%
Labour	Joseph Benedict McAllister	1,774	76.5%
Conservative	George Edward Mitchell Higgins	545	23.5%
Turnout		2,319	60.9%
Labour win (new seat)			

==== Millom ====
Millom (1 seat)
Party	Candidate	Votes	%
Conservative	Peter Hodgson	1,473	40.0%
Labour	John Park	1,459	39.6%
Liberal	Anthony Baines	748	20.3%
Turnout		1,413	65.5%
Conservative win (new seat)			

==== Mirehouse ====
Mirehouse (1 seat)
Party	Candidate	Votes	%
Labour	John Woolley	1,714	81.1%
Conservative	Jean Lewthwaite	399	18.9%
Turnout		2,113	59.2%
Labour win (new seat)			

==== Seascale & Whicham ====
Seascale & Whicham (1 seat)
Party	Candidate	Votes	%
Conservative	Susan Elizabeth Brown	1,778	53.2%
Liberal Democrats	Roger Charles Putnam	920	27.5%
Labour	George William Usher	642	19.2%
Turnout		3,340	69.7%
Conservative win (new seat)			

==== St Bees & Egremont ====
St Bees & Egremont (1 seat)
Party	Candidate	Votes	%
Labour	David Edward Southward	1,530	57.3%
Conservative	John Postlethwaite Holmes	1,142	42.7%
Turnout		2,672	63.5%
Labour win (new seat)			

=== Eden ===
==== Alston and East Fellside ====
Alston and East Fellside (1 seat)
Party	Candidate	Votes	%
Conservative	Dennis Youngman	1,164	35.5%
Liberal Democrats	George Winston Collinge	670	20.4%
Independent	Bryan Metz	629	19.2%
Independent	Richard Vincent Turner	341	10.4%
Labour	Lewis Moncrieff	309	9.4%
Legalise Cannabis	Mark Gibson	165	5.0%
Turnout		3,278	68.5%
Conservative win (new seat)			

==== Appleby ====
Appleby (1 seat)
Party	Candidate	Votes	%
Conservative	Mary Margaret Warburton	2,011	73.7%
Labour	Edward Robertson	719	26.3%
Turnout		2,730	63.9%
Conservative win (new seat)			

==== Eden Lakes ====
Eden Lakes (1 seat)
Party	Candidate	Votes	%
Conservative	Roger Andrew Bird	1,269	44.0%
Liberal Democrats	Neil Hughes	786	27.3%
Independent	John James Moffat	477	16.5%
Labour	Jeanette Bradley	352	12.2%
Turnout		2,884	66.6%
Conservative win (new seat)			

==== Greystoke and Hesket ====
Greystoke and Hesket (1 seat)
Party	Candidate	Votes	%
Conservative	Albert Pearson Richardson	1,391	45.1%
Independent	Gordon Richard Savage	614	19.9%
Liberal Democrats	David Treharne Leonard	535	17.3%
Labour	Elsie Coleman	351	11.4%
Green	Neville Bradshaw	196	6.3%
Turnout		3,087	69.6%
Conservative win (new seat)			

==== Kirkby Stephen ====
Kirkby Stephen (1 seat)
Party	Candidate	Votes	%
Conservative	Timothy Crispin Stoddard	1,257	40.9%
Independent	John Malcolm Smith	845	27.5%
Liberal Democrats	Nicholas James Pemberton	709	23.0%
Labour	Andrew Stevenson	266	8.6%
Turnout		3,077	65.2%
Conservative win (new seat)			

==== Penrith East ====
Penrith East (1 seat)
Party	Candidate	Votes	%
Liberal Democrats	Michael Ash	914	37.4%
Conservative	Helen Jane Fearon	824	33.7%
Labour	Christopher Merchant	416	17.0%
Independent	Graeme Collingwood	290	11.9%
Turnout		2,444	56.5%
Liberal Democrats win (new seat)			

==== Penrith North ====
Penrith North (1 seat)
Party	Candidate	Votes	%
Conservative	Philip Guy Chappelhow	1,328	47.1%
Liberal Democrats	David John Crouchley	963	34.1%
Labour	Ann Ellams	529	18.8%
Turnout		2,820	62.5%
Conservative win (new seat)			

==== Penrith Rural ====
Penrith Rural (1 seat)
Party	Candidate	Votes	%
Conservative	Gary Brian Strong	1,636	56.9%
Independent	David Ian Addison Nattrass	721	25.1%
Labour	Christopher Bagshaw	520	18.1%
Turnout		2,877	68.2%
Conservative win (new seat)			

==== Penrith West ====
Penrith West (1 seat)
Party	Candidate	Votes	%
Independent	Colin Nineham	713	33.1%
Conservative	John George Thompson	670	31.1%
Liberal Democrats	Geoffrey Charles Mason	409	19.0%
Labour	Geoffrey Rockliffe-King	362	16.8%
Turnout		2,154	53.1%
Independent win (new seat)			

=== South Lakeland ===
==== Cartmel ====
Cartmel (1 seat)
Party	Candidate	Votes	%
Liberal Democrats	Ronald Mein	1,564	54.1%
Conservative	William John Wearing	1,327	45.9%
Turnout		2,891	64.3%
Liberal Democrats win (new seat)			

==== Grange ====
Grange (1 seat)
Party	Candidate	Votes	%
Conservative	Peter Craig Jackson	2,090	60.2%
Liberal Democrats	Gwyneth Raymond	1,381	39.8%
Turnout		3,471	68.0%
Conservative win (new seat)			

==== High Furness ====
High Furness (1 seat)
Party	Candidate	Votes	%
Conservative	Oliver Henry Pearson	1,565	51.3%
Liberal Democrats	Edward Colin Davies	1,488	48.7%
Turnout		3,053	69.0%
Conservative win (new seat)			

==== Kendal Castle ====
Kendal Castle (1 seat)
Party	Candidate	Votes	%
Liberal Democrats	Thomas Clare	2,167	67.1%
Conservative	Olga Vyacheslavna Lewis	1,064	32.9%
Turnout		3,231	74.6%
Liberal Democrats win (new seat)			

==== Kendal Highgate ====
Kendal Highgate (1 seat)
Party	Candidate	Votes	%
Labour	Martyn Geoffrey Jowett	1,117	40.5%
Liberal Democrats	Brendan Jameson	990	35.9%
Conservative	Frank Brooks	648	23.5%
Turnout		2,755	61.0%
Labour win (new seat)			

==== Kendal Nether ====
Kendal Nether (1 seat)
Party	Candidate	Votes	%
Liberal Democrats	Leslie Lishman	1,273	41.9%
Labour	Paul Michael Braithwaite	953	31.4%
Conservative	Melvin Mackie	810	26.7%
Turnout		3,036	62.5%
Liberal Democrats win (new seat)			

==== Kendal South ====
Kendal South (1 seat)
Party	Candidate	Votes	%
Conservative	Alan Denis Bobbett	1,393	43.0%
Liberal Democrats	Graham Jeffrey Vincent	1,332	41.1%
Labour	Charles Henry Batteson	512	15.8%
Turnout		3,237	69.0%
Conservative win (new seat)			

==== Kendal Strickland and Fell ====
Kendal Strickland and Fell (1 seat)
Party	Candidate	Votes	%
Labour	David Thompson Clarke	1,469	51.3%
Liberal Democrats	Neil Anthony Mackereth	742	25.9%
Conservative	Elizabeth Muriel Graham	650	22.7%
Turnout		2861	62.9%
Labour win (new seat)			

==== Kent Estuary ====
Kent Estuary (1 seat)
Party	Candidate	Votes	%
Liberal Democrats	Ian Stewart	1,965	53.3%
Conservative	Richard William Rollins	1,725	46.7%
Turnout		3,690	70.6%
Liberal Democrats win (new seat)			

==== Lakes ====
Lakes (1 seat)
Party	Candidate	Votes	%
Liberal Democrats	Anne Parker	1,144	41.5%
Conservative	Brian Barton	1,059	38.4%
Independent	George Middleton	555	20.1%
Turnout		2,758	58.9%
Liberal Democrats win (new seat)			

==== Low Furness ====
Low Furness (1 seat)
Party	Candidate	Votes	%
Conservative	Robert James Webster	1,864	62.0%
Liberal Democrats	Noel Roy Spendlove	772	25.7%
Labour	Richard Scott	369	12.3%
Turnout		3,028	61.3%
Conservative win (new seat)			

==== Lower Kentdale ====
Lower Kentdale (1 seat)
Party	Candidate	Votes	%
Conservative	Roger Kenneth Bingham	2,207	69.0%
Liberal Democrats	Antony Jolley	991	31.0%
Turnout		3,198	72.2%
Conservative win (new seat)			

==== Lyth Valley ====
Lyth Valley (1 seat)
Party	Candidate	Votes	%
Conservative	James Bland	1,500	53.4%
Liberal Democrats	Stanley Bernard Collins	1,307	46.6%
Turnout		4,278	65.6%
Conservative win (new seat)			

==== Sedbergh and Kirkby Lonsdale ====
Sedbergh and Kirkby Lonsdale (1 seat)
Party	Candidate	Votes	%
Conservative	Joseph Nicholson	2,066	64.8%
Liberal Democrats	Sydney Charles McLennan	1,120	35.2%
Turnout		3,186	66.7%
Conservative win (new seat)			

==== Ulverston East ====
Ulverston East (1 seat)
Party	Candidate	Votes	%
Labour	Wendy Anne Kolbe	1,691	63.1%
Conservative	Christopher Mark Hornby	987	36.9%
Turnout		2,678	56.5%
Labour win (new seat)			

==== Ulverston West ====
Ulverston West (1 seat)
Party	Candidate	Votes	%
Conservative	Pauline Margaret Halfpenny	1,774	58.4%
Labour	Bharath Sundara Rajan	1,265	41.6%
Turnout		3,039	65.8%
Conservative win (new seat)			

==== Upper Kent ====
Upper Kent (1 seat)
Party	Candidate	Votes	%
Liberal Democrats	Lawson Short	1,640	53.1%
Conservative	Stephen Proctor	1,448	46.9%
Turnout		3,088	69.6%
Liberal Democrats win (new seat)			

==== Windermere ====
Windermere (1 seat)
Party	Candidate	Votes	%
Liberal Democrats	Joan Elizabeth Stocker	1,928	57.9%
Conservative	Ernest George Fallowfield	1,404	42.1%
Turnout		3,332	65.1%
Liberal Democrats win (new seat)			
