= 2017 Cumbria County Council election =

2017 UK local government election

- 4 May 2017

All 84 seats to Cumbria County Council 43 seats needed for a majority
	First party	Second party	Third party
Leader	James Airey	Stewart Young	Patricia Anne Bell
Party	Conservative	Labour	Liberal Democrats
Last election	25	35	16
Seats won	37	26	16
Seat change	▲12	▼10	0
Popular vote	62,696	37,276	25,308
Percentage	44.3%	26.3%	17.9%
Swing	▲13.3%	▼2.0%	▼0.1%
- Map showing the results of the 2017 Cumbria County Council elections.
Council control before election
No overall control
Council control after election
No overall control

The 2017 Cumbria County Council election took place on 4 May 2017 as part of the 2017 local elections in the United Kingdom. All 84 Cumbria county councillors were elected from electoral divisions which returned one county councillor each by first-past-the-post voting for a four-year term of office.

== Result summary ==
Party	Councillors				Votes		
Party		Of total	Net			Of total	Net
Conservative Party	37	44.0%	+14	37 / 84	62,696	44.3%	+13.1%
Labour Party	26	31.0%	-10	26 / 84	32,276	26.3%	-2.0%
Liberal Democrats	16	19.0%	+1	16 / 84	25,308	17.9%	-0.1%
Independent	5	6.0%	-2	5 / 84	7,797	5.5%	-0.9%
Green	0	0.0%	0	0 / 84	5,632	4.0%	+1.8%
UKIP	0	0.0%	0	0 / 84	2,791	2.0%	-9.7%

== Results by electoral division ==
=== Allerdale District ===
(16 seats, 16 electoral divisions)

Allerdale District
Party	Candidates						Votes		
Party	Stood	Elected	Gained	Unseated	Net	% of total	%	No.	Net %
Conservative	16	6	1	1	0		38.7	10,381	
Labour	15	6	1	2	-1		35.0	9,379	
Independent	4	3	1	0	1		10.0	2,689	
Liberal Democrats	5	1	1	0	1		6.6	1,767	
Green	14	0	0	0	0		6.4	1,724	-
UKIP	3	0	0	0	0		3.6	969	

==== Aspatria ====
Aspatria (1 seat)
Party	Candidate	Votes	%	±%
Conservative	Jim Lister	593	39.3	+1.1
Liberal Democrats	Phil Roberts	548	36.4	+33.5
Labour	Gregory Peter Kendall	262	17.4	−6.7
UKIP	David Wilson	211	6.7	n/a
Turnout		1,507	36.5	+6.5
Conservative hold		Swing		

==== Bothel and Wharrels ====
Bothel and Wharrels (1 seat)
Party	Candidate	Votes	%	±%
Conservative	Alan Bowness	1,235	66.4	+5.8
Green	Jill Perry	615	33.1	+12.2
Turnout		1,860	45.7	+8.1
Conservative hold		Swing		

==== Cockermouth North ====
Cockermouth North (1 seat)
Party	Candidate	Votes	%	±%
Liberal Democrats	Rebecca Charlotte Hanson	811	39.8	+34.3
Conservative	Peter Andrew Hardie Nicholson	609	29.9	−14.7
Labour	Isabel Jeanette Burns	546	26.8	−12.2
Green	Flic Crowley	70	3.4	−6.4
Turnout		2,040	40.4	+7.0
Liberal Democrats gain from Conservative		Swing		

==== Cockermouth South ====
Cockermouth South (1 seat)
Party	Candidate	Votes	%	±%
Conservative	Alan Kennon	1,117	56.2	+22.7
Labour	Andrew Irving Semple	579	29.1	+7.2
Liberal Democrats	Roger Peck	204	10.3	−13.0
Green	Jane Christine Roy	86	4.3	−1.8
Turnout		1,989	43.5	+5.4
Conservative hold		Swing		

==== Dearham and Broughton ====
Dearham and Broughton (1 seat)
Party	Candidate	Votes	%	±%
Conservative	Hugo George Greenbank Graham	805	48.9	+17.0
Labour	Alan Clark	641	38.9	+2.4
UKIP	Richard Mawdsley	112	6.8	−14.6
Green	Helen Hilda Smith	85	5.2	+1.9
Turnout		1,646	36.1	+1.0
Conservative gain from Labour		Swing		

==== Harrington ====
Harrington (1 seat)
Party	Candidate	Votes	%	±%
Independent	Marjorie Rae	613	46.7	−4.8
Labour	Janet Mary King	425	32.4	+7.7
Conservative	Neville John Lishman	189	14.4	n/a
Liberal Democrats	Reece Fleming	84	6.4	+4.5
Turnout		1,313	29.1	−2.3
Independent hold		Swing		

==== Keswick ====
Keswick (1 seat)
Party	Candidate	Votes	%	±%
Labour	Tony Lywood	933	51.5	+39.0
Conservative	Ronald Munby	608	33.6	+17.0
Green	Jack Frederick Lenox	268	14.8	+7.7
Turnout		1,811	42.4	+8.1
Labour gain from Independent		Swing		

==== Maryport North ====
Maryport North (1 seat)
Party	Candidate	Votes	%	±%
Labour	Carni McCarron-Holmes	663	38.6	+4.9
UKIP	George Masterton Kemp	646	37.6	+27.7
Conservative	Sarah Jane Pagan	318	18.5	+13.3
Green	Clare Brown	86	5.0	+0.7
Turnout		1,719	35.1	−4.6
Labour hold		Swing		

==== Maryport South ====
Maryport South (1 seat)
Party	Candidate	Votes	%	±%
Labour	Keith Anthony Little	983	72.7	+27.8
Conservative	Antony Armstrong Todd	285	21.1	+18.0
Green	Laura Rumney	84	6.2	+5.1
Turnout		1,353	29.5	−10.3
Labour hold		Swing		

==== Moss Bay and Moorclose ====
Moss Bay and Moorclose (1 seat)
Party	Candidate	Votes	%	±%
Independent	Stephen Stoddart	847	55.1	+8.4
Labour	Barbara Ann Cannon	484	31.5	−16.5
Conservative	Louise Mary Donnelly	188	12.2	+7.5
Green	Douglas Maw	17	1.1	n/a
Turnout		1,538	32.5	+2.1
Independent gain from Labour		Swing		

==== Seaton ====
Seaton (1 seat)
Party	Candidate	Votes	%	±%
Labour	Celia Tibble	755	48.4	+1.6
Conservative	Mark Ian Jenkinson	727	46.6	+38.6
Green	Alistair John Grey	74	4.7	n/a
Turnout		1,560	33.5	
Labour hold		Swing		

==== Solway Coast ====
Solway Coast (1 seat)
Party	Candidate	Votes	%	±%
Conservative	Tony Markley	884	50.3	−3.2
Independent	John Cook	525	29.9	n/a
Labour	Caroline Richardson	274	15.6	−1.5
Green	Richard Clive Rawson	70	4.0	−1.7
Turnout		1,758	41.2	+4.6
Conservative hold		Swing		

==== St John's and Great Clifton ====
St John's and Great Clifton (1 seat)
Party	Candidate	Votes	%	±%
Independent	Joe Holliday	704	40.0	−3.3
Labour	Anthony David McGuckin	635	36.1	+9.3
Conservative	Ann Vipond McKerrell	369	21.0	n/a
Green	Fliss Watts	52	3.0	+0.7
Turnout		1,761	34.7	+1.7
Independent hold		Swing		

==== St Michael's ====
St Michael's (1 seat)
Party	Candidate	Votes	%	±%
Labour	Alan Lawrence Barry	798	64.4	+13.3
Conservative	Gladys Wilson	277	22.3	+15.8
Liberal Democrats	Margaret Bennett	120	9.8	n/a
Green	Peter George Rowland Rigg	36	2.9	+0.4
Turnout		1,240	27.9	−0.6
Labour hold		Swing		

==== Thursby ====
Thursby (1 seat)
Party	Candidate	Votes	%	±%
Conservative	Duncan Stewart Fairbairn	1,294	72.9	+4.9
Labour	Bill Goldsmith	343	19.3	+1.7
Green	Dianne Estelle Standen	128	7.2	+0.2
Turnout		1,776	42.4	+8.6
Conservative hold		Swing		

==== Wigton ====
Wigton (1 seat)
Party	Candidate	Votes	%	±%
Labour	Roger John Liddle	1,058	53.0	+14.7
Conservative	Malcolm Grainger	883	44.2	+14.1
Green	Patricia Anne Ackred	53	2.7	−0.6
Turnout		1,998	38.3	+5.0
Labour hold		Swing		

=== Barrow-in-Furness ===
Barrow-in-Furness District
Party	Candidates						Votes		
Party	Stood	Elected	Gained	Unseated	Net	% of total	%	No.	Net %
Labour	11	6	0	4	-4		39.5	5,712	
Conservative	11	5	4	0	4		46.5	6,715	
UKIP	6	0	0	0	0		5.1	739	
Independent	1	0	0	0	0		1.0	148	
Liberal Democrats	1	0	0	0	0		0.4	63	

==== Dalton North ====
Dalton North (1 seat)
Party	Candidate	Votes	%	±%
Conservative	Ben Shirley	884	55.2	+31.2
Labour	Barry Doughty	569	35.5	−17.1
Independent	Glen David Higgins	148	9.2	n/a
Turnout		1,602	32.3	+8.9
Conservative gain from Labour		Swing		

==== Dalton South ====
Dalton South (1 seat)
Party	Candidate	Votes	%	±%
Conservative	Des English	683	49.7	+24.7
Labour	Ernie Wilson	508	37.0	−10.9
UKIP	Dick Young	115	8.4	−12.8
Liberal Democrats	Raymond George Beecham	63	4.6	n/a
Turnout		1,373	28.4	+5.5
Conservative gain from Labour		Swing		

==== Hawcoat ====
Hawcoat (1 seat)
Party	Candidate	Votes	%	±%
Conservative	Roy Worthington	1,245	74.1	+20.4
Labour	Connor James Lambton	429	25.5	+2.4
Turnout		1,681	35.1	+7.0
Conservative hold		Swing		

==== Hindpool ====
Hindpool (1 seat)
Party	Candidate	Votes	%	±%
Labour	Anne Burns	714	62.0	−5.8
Conservative	Anne Denise English	300	26.0	+12.3
UKIP	Dave Roberts	136	11.8	−5.8
Turnout		1,152	22.9	+3.5
Labour hold		Swing		

==== Newbarns and Parkside ====
Newbarns and Parkside (1 seat)
Party	Candidate	Votes	%	±%
Conservative	Sol Wielkopolski	683	49.6	+24.9
Labour	John Murphy	600	43.5	−3.1
UKIP	Karl Darrell Hunt	90	6.5	−16.3
Turnout		1,378	26.7	+3.2
Conservative gain from Labour		Swing		

==== Old Barrow ====
Old Barrow (1 seat)
Party	Candidate	Votes	%	±%
Labour	Helen Wall	577	60.0	−9.1
Conservative	Brenda Joyce Lauderdale	290	30.1	n/a
UKIP	Colin John Rudd	94	9.8	−20.2
Turnout		962	19.9	+1.9
Labour hold		Swing		

==== Ormsgill ====
Ormsgill (1 seat)
Party	Candidate	Votes	%	±%
Labour	Bill McEwan	660	51.7	+2.1
Conservative	Terri-Anne Gibney	398	31.2	+17.9
UKIP	Theresa Marie McMeekin	216	16.9	+2.6
Turnout		1,277	25.2	+2.9
Labour hold		Swing		

==== Risedale ====
Risedale (1 seat)
Party	Candidate	Votes	%	±%
Labour	Kevin Robert Hamilton	667	63.2	+1.4
Conservative	Jamie Samson	382	36.2	+25.8
Turnout		1,055	23.0	+2.5
Labour hold		Swing		

==== Roosecote ====
Roosecote (1 seat)
Party	Candidate	Votes	%	±%
Conservative	Derek Gawne	898	56.4	+21.3
Labour	Fred Chatfield	606	38.0	−9.6
UKIP	Pete Richards	88	5.5	−11.7
Turnout		1,593	30.6	−0.9
Conservative gain from Labour		Swing		

==== Walney North ====
Walney North (1 seat)
Party	Candidate	Votes	%	±%
Labour	Mel Worth	720	63.4	−7.6
Conservative	Martin David McLeavy	413	36.4	n/a
Turnout		1,135	26.0	0.0
Labour hold		Swing		

==== Walney South ====
Walney South (1 seat)
Party	Candidate	Votes	%	±%
Labour	Frank Cassidy	739	57.7	−5.6
Conservative	Rory McClure	539	42.1	+21.1
Turnout		1,280	30.5	+4.5
Labour hold		Swing		

=== Carlisle ===
Carlisle District
Party	Candidates						Votes		
Party	Stood	Elected	Gained	Unseated	Net	% of total	%	No.	Net %
Labour	17	8	0	1	-1		32.1	9,106	
Conservative	18	7	2	0	2		44.9	12,733	
Independent	5	2	0	1	-1		8.4	2,384	
Liberal Democrats	8	1	0	0	0		7.6	2,168	
Green	13	0	0	0	0		3.8	1,084	
UKIP	9	0	0	0	0		3.1	868	

==== Belah ====
Belah (1 seat)
Party	Candidate	Votes	%	±%
Conservative	Gareth Michael Ellis	951	48.1	+2.1
Labour	Paul Leslie Birks	538	27.2	+0.8
Independent	Alan Toole	478	24.2	n/a
Turnout		1,978	41.5	+5.7
Conservative gain from Independent		Swing		

==== Belle Vue ====
Belle Vue (1 seat)
Party	Candidate	Votes	%	±%
Labour	Christine Bowditch	742	46.0	−19.0
Conservative	Geoffrey Osbourne	722	44.8	+11.2
UKIP	Susan Riley	91	5.6	n/a
Green	Helen Elizabeth Atkinson	52	3.2	n/a
Turnout		1,612	35.7	+11.2
Labour hold		Swing		

==== Botcherby ====
Botcherby (1 seat)
Party	Candidate	Votes	%	±%
Independent	Robert William Betton	807	49.9	+11.3
Labour	Helen Anne Fisher	431	26.7	−1.7
Conservative	Paul Nedved	337	20.8	+1.5
Green	Deb Brown	40	2.5	n/a
Turnout		1,617	37.0	+7.3
Independent hold		Swing		

==== Brampton ====
Brampton (1 seat)
Party	Candidate	Votes	%	±%
Conservative	Lawrence Fisher	860	55.4	+7.0
Labour	Lesley Begley	321	20.7	−3.1
Liberal Democrats	Olwyn Doreen Luckley	135	8.7	+2.5
Green	Colin Luhrs	126	8.1	n/a
UKIP	John James Harding	107	6.9	−15.2
Turnout		1,553	37.1	+7.9
Conservative hold		Swing		

==== Castle ====
Castle (1 seat)
Party	Candidate	Votes	%	±%
Labour	Alan Robert McGuckin	469	43.3	+2.8
Conservative	James Bainbridge	364	33.6	+23.0
Liberal Democrats	David John Wood	117	10.8	−12.3
UKIP	Robbie Reid-Sinclair	77	7.1	−12.9
Green	Richard Sebastian Hunt	53	4.9	+0.9
Turnout		1,084	28.0	+4.4
Labour hold		Swing		

==== Corby and Hayton ====
Corby and Hayton (1 seat)
Party	Candidate	Votes	%	±%
Independent	William James Graham	830	47.6	−25.4
Conservative	Keith Meller	608	34.9	+8.6
Liberal Democrats	Alison Elizabeth Hobson	177	10.2	n/a
Green	Charmian Jess McCutcheon	124	7.1	n/a
Turnout		1,742	46.3	+8.9
Independent hold		Swing		

==== Currock ====
Currock (1 seat)
Party	Candidate	Votes	%	±%
Labour	Reg Watson	562	54.4	+1.4
Conservative	Geoff Mitchell	309	29.9	+15.1
Independent	Jeffrey Bomford	96	9.3	n/a
Green	Sky Fiona Higgins	64	6.2	−2.8
Turnout		1,033	24.5	+3.5
Labour hold		Swing		

==== Dalston and Burgh ====
Dalston and Burgh (1 seat)
Party	Candidate	Votes	%	±%
Liberal Democrats	Trevor Allison	1,048	46.8	+7.6
Conservative	Katharine Oliver	936	41.8	+9.4
Labour	Ray Warwick	248	11.1	−1.8
Turnout		2,239	42.8	+4.7
Liberal Democrats hold		Swing		

==== Denton Holme ====
Denton Holme (1 seat)
Party	Candidate	Votes	%	±%
Labour	Hugh McDevitt	800	59.9	+3.4
Conservative	Syed Ali	360	26.9	+15.2
Green	Neil Boothman	93	7.0	−1.3
UKIP	Kerryanne Mckay Wilde	80	6.0	−12.8
Turnout		1,336	29.9	+4.7
Labour hold		Swing		

==== Harraby North ====
Harraby North (1 seat)
Party	Candidate	Votes	%	±%
Labour	Cyril Frederick Weber	737	66.5	+2.1
Conservative	Barbara Eden	358	32.3	+20.4
Turnout		1,108	25.2	+1.5
Labour hold		Swing		

==== Harraby South ====
Harraby South (1 seat)
Party	Candidate	Votes	%	±%
Labour	Deborah Anne Earl	671	44.7	+0.4
Conservative	Michael Randall	655	43.6	+16.7
Independent	Jack Paton	173	11.5	n/a
Turnout		1,501	36.8	+8.2
Labour hold		Swing		

==== Houghton and Irthington ====
Houghton and Irthington (1 seat)
Party	Candidate	Votes	%	±%
Conservative	John Mallinson	1,112	65.5	+13.1
Labour	Maggie Robinson	262	15.4	−3.7
Liberal Democrats	Brendan Murphy	140	8.2	n/a
UKIP	Fiona Rachel Mills	90	5.3	−22.7
Green	Hazel Jane Graham	88	5.2	n/a
Turnout		1,697	39.7	+5.9
Conservative hold		Swing		

==== Longtown ====
Longtown (1 seat)
Party	Candidate	Votes	%	±%
Conservative	Val Tarbitt	921	73.9	+26.8
Labour	Stephen Ronald Sidgwick	215	17.3	−3.7
UKIP	Graham Moore	109	8.7	−19.8
Turnout		1,246	33.2	+5.3
Conservative hold		Swing		

==== Morton ====
Morton (1 seat)
Party	Candidate	Votes	%	±%
Labour	John Bell	804	58.7	+0.9
Conservative	David Shepherd	477	34.8	+20.8
Green	Rob Morrison	84	6.1	n/a
Turnout		1,369	31.3	−0.5
Labour hold		Swing		

==== Stanwix Urban ====
Stanwix Urban (1 seat)
Party	Candidate	Votes	%	±%
Conservative	Elizabeth Mallinson	1,123	57.0	+16.3
Labour	Tim Linford	548	27.8	−2.5
Green	Helen Davison	216	11.0	+3.8
UKIP	Phil Douglass	83	4.2	−13.3
Turnout		1,970	45.2	+5.0
Conservative hold		Swing		

==== Upperby ====
Upperby (1 seat)
Party	Candidate	Votes	%	±%
Labour	Stewart Farries Young	703	52.4	−10.4
Conservative	Fiona Robson	415	30.9	+14.6
UKIP	John Gordon Denholm	120	8.9	n/a
Liberal Democrats	James Ernest Osler	70	5.2	−4.2
Green	Penelope Bothepa Foster	31	2.3	n/a
Turnout		1,341	30.2	+1.3
Labour hold		Swing		

==== Wetheral ====
Wetheral (1 seat)
Party	Candidate	Votes	%	±%
Conservative	Nick Marriner	1,297	65.2	+25.9
Liberal Democrats	Michael Anthony Gee	307	15.4	+5.3
Labour	Stephen John William Bowditch	300	15.1	−5.2
Green	Dallas Jane Brewis	85	4.3	+0.1
Turnout		1,990	45.3	+6.6
Conservative hold		Swing		

==== Yewdale ====
Yewdale (1 seat)
Party	Candidate	Votes	%	±%
Conservative	Stephen Haraldsen	928	46.3	+20.9
Labour	Beth Furneaux	755	37.6	−10.2
Liberal Democrats	Jeff Coates	174	8.7	n/a
UKIP	Malcolm Fraser Craik	111	5.5	−21.1
Green	Henry Bryson Goodwin	28	1.4	n/a
Turnout		2,006	43.6	+8.7
Conservative gain from Labour		Swing		

=== Copeland ===
Copeland District
Party	Candidates						Votes		
Party	Stood	Elected	Gained	Unseated	Net	% of total	%	No.	Net %
Conservative	12	8	5	0	6		48.9	8,377	
Labour	12	4	0	5	-5		40.2	6,887	
Independent	6	0	0	0	0		8.4	1,287	
Green	5	0	0	0	0		2.2	379	
UKIP	2	0	0	0	0		0.8	140	
Liberal Democrats	1	0	0	0	0		0.4	66	

==== Bransty ====
Bransty (1 seat)
Party	Candidate	Votes	%	±%
Conservative	Graham Robert Phillip Melville Roberts	607	42.6	−6.2
Labour	Rachel Margaret Holliday	561	39.3	−10.6
Independent	Charles Edward Maudling	220	15.4	n/a
Green	Meggie Bedford	38	2.7	−n/a
Turnout		1,426	33.1	+7.4
Conservative gain from Labour		Swing		

==== Cleator Moor East and Frizington ====
Cleator Moor East and Frizington (1 seat)
Party	Candidate	Votes	%	±%
Conservative	Arthur William Creighton Lamb	629	46.9	+17.9
Labour	Tim Knowles	612	45.6	−3.0
Green	Allan Franciscus Todd	93	6.9	+0.9
Turnout		1,341	30.7	+3.7
Conservative gain from Labour		Swing		

==== Cleator Moor West ====
Cleator Moor West (1 seat)
Party	Candidate	Votes	%	±%
Labour	Frank Irving Morgan	567	50.6	−14.0
Conservative	Genna Elaine Haraldsen	309	27.6	+12.4
Independent	Christopher Patrick Ross	112	10.0	n/a
Liberal Democrats	Mike Monigue	66	5.9	n/a
UKIP	Nicholas Frederick Ford	65	5.8	n/a
Turnout		1,120	25.2	+2.7
Labour hold		Swing		

==== Egremont ====
Egremont (1 seat)
Party	Candidate	Votes	%	±%
Labour	David Edward Southward	789	53.8	+3.2
Conservative	Alistair William Millar Norwood	677	46.1	+28.1
Turnout		1,470	31.5	+4.9
Labour hold		Swing		

==== Egremont North and St Bees ====
Egremont North and St Bees (1 seat)
Party	Candidate	Votes	%	±%
Conservative	Chris Whiteside	626	42.6	+7.1
Labour	Henry Wormstrup	469	31.9	−4.8
Independent	Wammo Walmsley	208	14.2	n/a
Independent	Jayne Anne Laine	163	11.1	n/a
Turnout		1,469	33.8	+9.9
Conservative gain from Labour		Swing		

==== Gosforth ====
Gosforth (1 seat)
Party	Candidate	Votes	%	±%
Conservative	Christopher Paul Turner	1,144	60.8	−11.4
Independent	Sam Meteer	366	19.4	n/a
Labour	Peter Kane	311	16.5	−9.3
Green	Daniel James Nixon	57	3.0	n/a
Turnout		1,882	40.1	+6.7
Conservative hold		Swing		

==== Hillcrest and Hensingham ====
Hillcrest and Hensingham (1 seat)
Party	Candidate	Votes	%	±%
Conservative	Andrew William Wonnacott	816	50.3	+5.5
Labour	Christine Wharrier	801	49.4	−5.1
Turnout		1,623	36.7	+6.5
Conservative gain from Labour		Swing		

==== Howgate ====
Howgate (1 seat)
Party	Candidate	Votes	%	±%
Conservative	Martin Steven Barbour	623	47.6	+17.0
Labour	Gillian Ruth Troughton	566	43.2	−16.7
UKIP	Eric William Atkinson	75	5.7	−n/a
Green	Sharon Josephine Watson	44	3.4	−5.1
Turnout		1,309	29.3	+4.1
Conservative gain from Labour		Swing		

==== Kells and Sandwith ====
Kells and Sandwith (1 seat)
Party	Candidate	Votes	%	±%
Labour	Emma Louise Williamson	684	51.7	−7.4
Conservative	Brigid Anne Whiteside	419	31.7	+13.7
Independent	Michael Patrick Anthony Guest	218	16.5	−n/a
Turnout		1,322	28.0	+2.1
Labour hold		Swing		

==== Millom ====
Millom (1 seat)
Party	Candidate	Votes	%	±%
Conservative	Doug Wilson	967	68.4	+26.8
Labour	Denise Barbara Burness	442	31.3	−1.7
Turnout		1,413	31.4	+3.2
Conservative hold		Swing		

==== Millom Without ====
Millom Without (1 seat)
Party	Candidate	Votes	%	±%
Conservative	Keith Haigh Hitchen	1,150	72.7	+10.3
Labour	Ryan Woods	281	17.8	−5.4
Green	Sally Millar	147	9.3	−3.4
Turnout		1,582	39.6	+7.9
Conservative hold		Swing		

==== Mirehouse ====
Mirehouse (1 seat)
Party	Candidate	Votes	%	±%
Labour	Mike Hawkins	804	66.0	+4.1
Conservative	Jane Margaret Micklethwaite	410	33.6	+19.0
Turnout		1,219	28.5	+3.2
Labour hold		Swing		

=== Eden ===
Eden District
Party	Candidates						Votes		
Party	Stood	Elected	Gained	Unseated	Net	% of total	%	No.	Net %
Conservative	9	5	0	1	-1		48.1	7,948	
Liberal Democrats	9	3	1	0	1		30.0	4,954	
Labour	6	1	1	0	1		8.9	1,476	
Independent	3	0	0	1	-1		7.8	1,289	
Green	6	0	0	0	0		3.1	510	
UKIP	2	0	0	0	0		0.9	142	

==== Alston and East Fellside ====
Alston and East Fellside (1 seat)
Party	Candidate	Votes	%	±%
Labour	Claire Susan Driver	836	35.1	+24.7
Conservative	Walter Walker	688	28.9	+2.7
Independent	Mary Robinson	624	26.2	−9.8
Liberal Democrats	Deb Holden	116	4.9	n/a
Green	Alan William Marsden	114	4.8	−8.6
Turnout		2,380	46.1	+14.0
Labour gain from Independent		Swing		

==== Appleby ====
Appleby (1 seat)
Party	Candidate	Votes	%	±%
Liberal Democrats	Andy Connell	909	48.1	+19.4
Conservative	John Mervyn Owen	844	44.7	−2.7
Labour	John Potts	78	4.1	n/a
Green	Kimberly Jane Lawson	56	3.0	n/a
Turnout		1,888	41.6	+8.6
Liberal Democrats gain from Conservative		Swing		

==== Eden Lakes ====
Eden Lakes (1 seat)
Party	Candidate	Votes	%	±%
Liberal Democrats	Neil Hughes	1,129	54.6	+6.5
Conservative	Laura Elizabeth Kay	931	45.1	+2.1
Turnout		2,066	48.0	+8.5
Liberal Democrats hold		Swing		

==== Greystoke and Hesket ====
Greystoke and Hesket (1 seat)
Party	Candidate	Votes	%	±%
Conservative	Tom Wentworth Waites	1,009	57.2	+5.5
Liberal Democrats	Roger Burgin	255	14.5	−7.8
Green	Doug Lawson	205	11.6	n/a
Labour	Ruth Ann Wood	201	11.4	n/a
UKIP	David Benson Ryland	89	5.0	−18.7
Turnout		1,763	36.3	+7.2
Conservative hold		Swing		

==== Kirkby Stephen ====
Kirkby Stephen (1 seat)
Party	Candidate	Votes	%	±%
Conservative	Phil Dew	1,605	70.1	+15.1
Liberal Democrats	Kelvyn Justin Simon James	407	17.8	−8.3
Labour	Ian Daniel Simkins	194	8.5	n/a
Green	Richard Kevin O'Brien	77	3.4	n/a
Turnout		2,289	45.2	+9.4
Conservative hold		Swing		

==== Penrith East ====
Penrith East (1 seat)
Party	Candidate	Votes	%	±%
Liberal Democrats	Patricia Ann Bell	955	60.8	+4.6
Conservative	John Forrester	445	28.3	+10.3
Labour	Hilary Jane Snell	85	5.4	−6.0
UKIP	Mary Elizabeth Dixon	53	3.4	−8.8
Green	Ali Ross	29	1.8	n/a
Turnout		1,570	34.3	+4.6
Liberal Democrats hold		Swing		

==== Penrith North ====
Penrith North (1 seat)
Party	Candidate	Votes	%	±%
Conservative	Hilary Frances Carrick	1,031	64.2	+24.1
Liberal Democrats	Virginia Christine Taylor	574	35.8	+1.8
Turnout		1,617	35.9	+1.3
Conservative hold		Swing		

==== Penrith Rural ====
Penrith Rural (1 seat)
Party	Candidate	Votes	%	±%
Conservative	David Whipps	888	51.3	−22.6
Independent	Michael Christopher Tonkin	405	23.4	n/a
Liberal Democrats	Lorna Ann Baker	290	16.8	−6.8
Green	Wade Tidbury	143	8.3	
Turnout		1,731	37.9	+6.6
Conservative hold		Swing		

==== Penrith West ====
Penrith West (1 seat)
Party	Candidate	Votes	%	±%
Conservative	Helen Jane Fearon	507	40.6	+7.8
Liberal Democrats	Judith Margaret Derbyshire	319	25.6	−4.2
Independent	Lee Quinn	260	16.8	n/a
Labour	Dave Knaggs	160	12.8	+2.9
Turnout		1,248	28.9	+5.1
Conservative hold		Swing		

=== South Lakeland ===
==== Cartmel ====
Cartmel (1 seat)
Party	Candidate	Votes	%	±%
Liberal Democrats	Sue Sanderson	1,111	53.4	−14.0
Conservative	Steve Chambers	873	42.0	+9.9
Green	Robin Smallwood Le Mare	94	4.5	n/a
Turnout		2,080	50.8	+7.7
Liberal Democrats hold		Swing		

==== Grange ====
Grange (1 seat)
Party	Candidate	Votes	%	±%
Conservative	Bill Wearing	1,318	62.0	+3.1
Liberal Democrats	Dave Khan	586	27.6	−11.9
Labour	Nicola Kennedy	135	6.3	n/a
Green	Laura Miller	83	3.9	n/a
Turnout		2,126	47.4	+7.1
Conservative hold		Swing		

==== High Furness ====
High Furness (1 seat)
Party	Candidate	Votes	%	±%
Conservative	Matt Brereton	1,059	48.4	+11.9
Liberal Democrats	David William Norman Fletcher	798	36.5	−2.8
Labour	Gerry Scott	222	10.2	+1.6
Green	Chris Loynes	103	4.7	n/a
Turnout		2,186	48.8	+5.9
Conservative gain from Liberal Democrats		Swing		

==== Kendal Castle ====
Kendal Castle (1 seat)
Party	Candidate	Votes	%	±%
Liberal Democrats	Chris Hogg	1,267	57.9	−14.7
Conservative	Harry James Albert Taylor	703	32.1	+14.6
Labour	Jim Ring	133	6.1	−3.3
Green	Gwen Harrison	83	3.8	n/a
Turnout		2,188	46.0	+7.9
Liberal Democrats hold		Swing		

==== Kendal Highgate ====
Kendal Highgate (1 seat)
Party	Candidate	Votes	%	±%
Liberal Democrats	Geoff Cook	922	53.9	−4.9
Conservative	Emma Therese Marie Hines	426	24.9	+15.9
Labour	Paul Braithwaite	251	14.8	−5.2
Green	Phil Whiting	107	6.3	n/a
Turnout		1,710	37.7	+6.6
Liberal Democrats hold		Swing		

==== Kendal Nether ====
Kendal Nether (1 seat)
Party	Candidate	Votes	%	±%
Liberal Democrats	Shirley Amelia Evans	1,234	60.0	−4.7
Conservative	Pamela Mary Flitcroft	531	25.8	+5.8
Labour	Eli Aldridge	188	9.1	−5.6
Green	Andy Mason	100	4.9	n/a
Turnout		2,056	43.2	+9.4
Liberal Democrats hold		Swing		

==== Kendal South ====
Kendal South (1 seat)
Party	Candidate	Votes	%	±%
Liberal Democrats	Brenda Clare Gray	1,195	48.5	−14.6
Conservative	Andrew John Lucas	1,025	41.6	+13.0
Labour	Jackson Softley Stubbs	131	5.3	−2.5
Green	Meg Hill	109	4.4	n/a
Turnout		2,463	52.0	+8.0
Liberal Democrats hold		Swing		

==== Kendal Strickland and Fell ====
Kendal Strickland and Fell (1 seat)
Party	Candidate	Votes	%	±%
Liberal Democrats	Peter Carlyle Thornton	1,170	54.6	+2.5
Conservative	Michael Patrick Nicholson	443	20.7	+10.5
Labour	Virginia Elizabeth Branney	353	16.5	−13.4
Green	Ian Rodham	167	7.8	n/a
Turnout		2,141	44.2	+6.0
Liberal Democrats hold		Swing		

==== Kent Estuary ====
Kent Estuary (1 seat)
Party	Candidate	Votes	%	±%
Liberal Democrats	Ian Stewart	1,422	52.9	−10.9
Conservative	Tom Harvey	995	37.0	+8.1
Green	Jill Abel	162	6.0	n/a
Labour	Lois Katherine Sparling	103	3.8	−3.0
Turnout		2,686	52.4	+7.6
Liberal Democrats hold		Swing		

==== Lakes ====
Lakes (1 seat)
Party	Candidate	Votes	%	±%
Liberal Democrats	Will Clark	782	52.9	−1.8
Conservative	Tim Brown	564	38.2	−0.2
Labour	Alison Faith Gilchrist	79	5.3	−1.2
Green	Chris Rowley	49	3.3	n/a
Turnout		1,477	46.3	+3.2
Liberal Democrats hold		Swing		

==== Low Furness ====
Low Furness (1 seat)
Party	Candidate	Votes	%	±%
Liberal Democrats	Janet Willis	994	47.6	−2.5
Conservative	Andrew Butcher	861	41.2	+7.3
Labour	Shirley-Anne Wilson	191	9.1	−6.9
Green	Peter Howlett	45	2.2	n/a
Turnout		2,093	45.8	+8.2
Liberal Democrats hold		Swing		

==== Lower Kentdale ====
Lower Kentdale (1 seat)
Party	Candidate	Votes	%	±%
Conservative	Roger Kenneth Bingham	1,715	69.6	+10.1
Liberal Democrats	Gordon Victor Higton	510	20.7	−7.3
Labour	Paul John Casson	139	5.6	+0.0
Green	Simon Blunden	97	3.9	n/a
Turnout		2,463	52.4	−4.3
Conservative hold		Swing		

==== Lyth Valley ====
Lyth Valley (1 seat)
Party	Candidate	Votes	%	±%
Conservative	James Bland	1,247	65.0	+3.6
Liberal Democrats	Bex Cooper	530	27.6	−0.2
Green	Adam Mark Rubinstein	99	5.2	n/a
UKIP	Stephen Willmott	43	2.2	−8.3
Turnout		1,919	47.5	+5.5
Conservative hold		Swing		

==== Sedbergh and Kirkby Lonsdale ====
Sedbergh and Kirkby Lonsdale (1 seat)
Party	Candidate	Votes	%	±%
Liberal Democrats	Nick Cotton	1,253	48.7	−2.2
Conservative	Kevin John Lancaster	1,163	45.2	−2.6
Labour	Nick Cross	91	3.5	n/a
Green	Daphne Mary Jackson	60	2.3	n/a
Turnout		2,571	55.1	+5.6
Liberal Democrats hold		Swing		

==== Ulverston East ====
Ulverston East (1 seat)
Party	Candidate	Votes	%	±%
Labour	John Mark Wilson	758	46.0	−3.2
Conservative	Helen Irving	620	37.6	−6.0
Liberal Democrats	Andrew Hudson	168	10.2	−0.8
Green	Bob Gerry	98	6.0	−2.8
Turnout		1,647	36.3	+10.0
Labour hold		Swing		

==== Ulverston West ====
Ulverston West (1 seat)
Party	Candidate	Votes	%	±%
Conservative	James Airey	1,146	54.9	+8.6
Labour Co-op	David John Webster	552	26.5	−4.4
Liberal Democrats	Loraine Birchall	235	11.3	+7.9
Green	Judy Filmore	149	7.1	+1.2
Turnout		2,086	45.9	+6.3
Conservative hold		Swing		

==== Upper Kent ====
Upper Kent (1 seat)
Party	Candidate	Votes	%	±%
Liberal Democrats	Stan Collins	1,104	51.9	−15.7
Conservative	Margaret Bond	756	35.5	+4.3
Green	Adrian Robert Porter	158	7.4	n/a
Labour	Andy Windsor	109	5.1	n/a
Turnout		2,129	46.1	+10.9
Liberal Democrats hold		Swing		

==== Windermere ====
Windermere (1 seat)
Party	Candidate	Votes	%	±%
Conservative	Ben Berry	1,097	47.9	+29.3
Liberal Democrats	Steve Rooke	1,009	44.1	−17.8
Labour	Penny Henderson	124	5.4	+1.7
Green	Kate Threadgold	58	2.5	n/a
Turnout		2,290	48.2	+8.1
Conservative gain from Liberal Democrats		Swing		

== By-elections between 2019 and 2021 ==
The consultation on local reorganisation in Cumbria meant that Cumbria County Council elections did not go ahead as planned in 2021. However, elections for the vacant seats on councils were held on Thursday 6 May 2021. These were - Brampton, Cockermouth North, St John's & Great Clifton and Ulverston West.

On 17 June 2020, a by-election of Corby & Hayton was announced after the resignation of Independent councillor William Graham. A by-election took place on 26 August to fill the vacant seat, and was won by the Liberal Democrats.

=== Brampton ===
Brampton
Party	Candidate	Votes	%	±%
Conservative	Mike Mitchelson	933	56.2	+0.8
Liberal Democrats	Roger Dobson	272	16.4	+7.7
Labour	Chris Willis	246	14.8	−5.9
Green	Joanne Bates	208	12.5	+4.4
Turnout		1,659	37.8	
Conservative hold		Swing		

=== Cockermouth North ===
Cockermouth North
Party	Candidate	Votes	%	±%
Conservative	Catherine Bell	807	41.3	+11.4
Labour	Alan Smith	546	28.0	+1.1
Liberal Democrats	Fiona Jayatilaka	411	21.0	−18.8
Green	Jill Perry	135	6.9	+3.5
Independent	Nicky Cockburn	54	2.8	+2.8
Majority				
Turnout		1,953	36.9%	−
Conservative gain from Liberal Democrats		Swing		

=== St John's & Great Clifton ===
St John's & Great Clifton
Party	Candidate	Votes	%	±%
Conservative	Debbie Garton	621	36.8	+15.8
Labour	Anthony McGuckin	603	35.8	+0.3
Independent	Paul Scott	368	21.8	+21.8
Liberal Democrats	Margaret Bennett	54	3.2	+3.2
Green	Cathy Grout	41	2.4	−0.6
Majority				
Turnout		1,687	33.4	−
Conservative gain from Independent		Swing		

=== Ulverston West ===
Ulverston West
Party	Candidate	Votes	%	±%
Green	Judy Filmore	885	39.6	+32.5
Conservative	Andrew Butcher	869	38.9	−16
Labour	David Webster	380	17.0	−9.5
Liberal Democrats	Lorraine Birchall	102	4.6	−6.7
Majority				
Turnout		2,236	48.4	−
Green gain from Conservative		Swing		

=== Corby and Hayton ===
Corby & Hayton
Party	Candidate	Votes	%	±%
Liberal Democrats	Roger Dobson	857	71.0	+60.8
Conservative	Tim Cheetham	350	29.0	−6.0
Majority		507	42.0	
Turnout		1207	30.4	−
Liberal Democrats gain from Independent		Swing		
