= 2009 Cumbria County Council election =

2009 UK local government election

- 4 June 2009

All 84 seats to Cumbria County Council 43 seats needed for a majority
	First party	Second party	Third party
Party	Conservative	Labour	Liberal Democrats
Last election	32 seats, 38.7%	39 seats, 36.1%	11 seats, 19.6%
Seats won	38	24	16
Seat change	▲6	▼15	▲5
Popular vote	62,488	33,281	38,250
Percentage	40.1%	21.4%	24.6%
Swing	▲1.4%	▼14.7%	▲5.0%
	Fourth party	Fifth party
Party	Independent	Socialist People's Party
Last election	2 seats, 4.7%	0 seats, 0.4%
Seats won	5	1
Seat change	▲3	▲1
Popular vote	7,626	1,395
Percentage	4.9%	0.9%
Swing	▼%	▲0.5%
- 2009 local election results in Cumbria
Council control before election
No Overall Control
Council control after election
No Overall Control

An election to Cumbria County Council took place on 2 May 2009 as part of the 2009 United Kingdom local elections. All 84 councillors were elected from various electoral divisions, which returned one or two county councillors each by first-past-the-post voting for a four-year term of office. They coincided with an election for the European Parliament. All 84 seats in the Council were up for election, and a total of 301 candidates stood. The total number of people registered to vote was 392,931. Prior to the election local Conservatives were leading a coalition with the Liberal Democrats with the Labour party as the council's official opposition.

All locally registered electors (British, Irish, Commonwealth and European Union citizens) who were aged 18 or over on Thursday 2 May 2013 were entitled to vote in the local elections. Those who were temporarily away from their ordinary address (for example, away working, on holiday, in student accommodation or in hospital) were also entitled to vote in the local elections, although those who had moved abroad and registered as overseas electors cannot vote in the local elections. It is possible to register to vote at more than one address (such as a university student who had a term-time address and lives at home during holidays) at the discretion of the local Electoral Register Office, but it remains an offence to vote more than once in the same local government election.

== Background ==
In the previous election, held on 5 May 2005, the Labour Party won 39 seats, the Conservative Party 32, the Liberal Democrats 11, and independents two. By the end of this term, the Liberal Democrats had lost one councillor, and there were three independents. As in the 2001 election, the Council was left hung. For most of these eight years, the Conservatives and Liberal Democrats formed a coalition, although Labour is running a minority administration going into the election. On a national level, the Conservative Party are polling well and have targeted Carlisle and Barrow-in-Furness, although Richard Moss, BBC Political Editor for the North East and Cumbria, has said that an absolute majority is unlikely. It is considered to be a "safer area" than some of the other councils up for election in 2009, but the Liberal Democrats have also been making a push in the region.

In 2008, the Council rejected the idea of having a directly elected mayor, instead opting for a cabinet-style administration that resembled the previous system. The new model will be adopted after this election. A proposal for the Council to become a unitary authority was made in 2007, and Cumbria went into consultation stage, although the idea was rejected. The plan was opposed by the district councils—which would have disappeared under the arrangement—of Carlisle, Allerdale, Eden, Copeland, South Lakeland, and Barrow-in-Furness, and Carlisle MP Eric Martlew, who believed that a referendum should have been held on the same day as the district council elections of 3 May 2007.

Other parties fielding candidates in the election included the British National Party (BNP), the Green Party, the United Kingdom Independence Party (UKIP), and the People's Party, which had seen success in Barrow previous years, where all six of its candidates were standing. The BNP is set to stand in 42 wards, after fielding none in the 2005 election. The leaders of the Council's Conservative, Labour, Liberal Democrat and People's Party groups all said that they felt the BNP would be unsuccessful. Christian church leaders also criticised the BNP for appealing to Christians in its campaigns, saying that the party was trying to stir up "racial and religious hatred." Mike Ashburner, Barrow and South Lakeland organiser for the BNP and the party's Hawcoat candidate, denied that the BNP was a racist party, and said that the reason for standing in Cumbria was "simply that our policies are so popular with people." In a 2007 by-election for the Kells and Sandwith (Whitehaven) ward, the party's candidate gained 40.1% of the vote, narrowly losing to the Labour candidate. Coming into the European elections, the BNP was perceived as having the best chance, nationally, to win a seat in the North West England constituency, where party leader Nick Griffin is running.

In the Labour Party's manifesto, plans were set out to cap council tax increases at three per cent in each of the next four years; Council leader Stewart Young justified this by saying that people were not prepared to pay above the rate of inflation any more. The party promised improvements to schooling and roads, and Young said that he hoped the party would be judged on its record in office, and not by the performances for the incumbent UK Labour government. The Conservatives pledged to have a blanket 30 mph speed limit in any village big enough to display a name sign, improved roads, and said that they would "remodel" Cumbria Care so that fewer elderly people felt the need to move into care homes. The Liberal Democrats said that they would introduce cheaper bus fees for young people, a clampdown on speeding, a review of road maintenance and the introduction of four new transport schemes, and schemes designed to give communities greater access to the Council.

2005 Cumbria County Council election
Party	Seats
Labour	39
Conservative	32
Liberal Democrats	11
Independent	2

== Results ==
2009 Cumbria County Council election
Party	Seats	Gains	Losses	Net gain/loss	Seats %	Votes %	Votes	+/−
Conservative	38			▲6	45.2	40.1	62,488	▲6.5
Labour	24			▼15	28.6	21.4	33,281	▼14.7
Liberal Democrats	16			▲5	19.0	24.6	38,250	▲5.0
Independent	5			▲3	6.0	4.9	7,626	▲0.2
Socialist People's Party	1			▲1	1.2	0.9	1,395	▲0.5
BNP	0			Steady	0.0	5.2	8,151	New
Green	0			Steady	0.0	2.2	3,377	▲2.0
UKIP	0			Steady	0.0	0.8	1,188	▲0.7
