= Cumbria County Council =

Former local authority in England

- Arms of Cumbria County Council

- Council logo

Type
- Type: Non-metropolitan county council

Leadership
- Chairman: Tim Westoll (first); Tony Markley (last)

Elections
- Voting system: First-past-the-post
- Last election: 4 May 2017

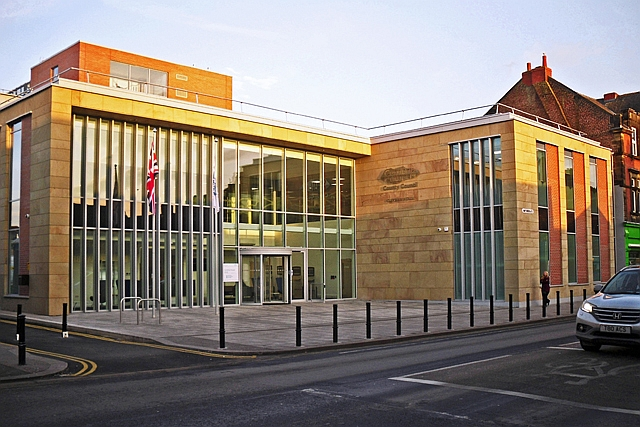
Main offices: Cumbria House, Botchergate, Carlisle

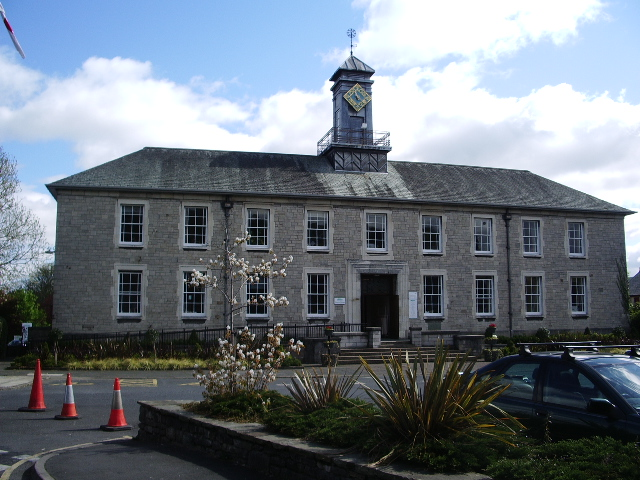
Meeting place: County Offices, Kendal

Cumbria County Council was the county council for the non-metropolitan county of Cumbria in the North West of England between 1974 and 2023. It was responsible for county-level services, including schools, roads, and social services. It worked in a two-tier arrangement with the county's six district councils.

On 1 April 2023, the county council and six district councils were abolished. In their place two new councils were created, with local government functions transferred to the two new unitary authorities: Cumberland Council and Westmorland and Furness Council. Cumbria continues to exist as a ceremonial county, but no longer has a county-wide elected council.

== Creation ==
In 1974, under the Local Government Act 1972, the administrative counties of Cumberland and Westmorland and the county borough of Carlisle were abolished, and the areas they covered were combined with parts of Lancashire and the West Riding of Yorkshire to form a new non-metropolitan county called Cumbria.

== Functions ==
Cumbria County Council was responsible for the more strategic local services of the county, including education (schools, both primary and secondary), libraries and youth services, social services, highway maintenance, waste disposal, emergency planning, consumer protection, and town and country planning for minerals matters, waste and for highways. This made it a substantial employer.

The former Cumberland County Council's final major road scheme, an A66 bypass for Keswick, was prepared by Scott Wilson Kirkpatrick, consulting engineers, in 1972, and construction began in the summer of 1974, with the new authority completing the scheme.

The Council operated various recycling and waste disposal facilities across the area. In January 2012, the Council announced plans to close six of these centres. The six sites identified by the review as most suitable for closure are at Ambleside, Brampton, Grange-over-Sands, Kirkby Stephen, Millom and Wigton.

The administrative offices were at Cumbria House in Botchergate, Carlisle, and full council meetings were held at the County Offices in Kendal.

== History ==
Control of the council swung back and forth. In its first four years (1973–1977) there was no overall control, but in 1977 the Conservatives gained a majority. In 1981, this became a majority for Labour, and from 1985 there was again no one-party control. In 1997, Labour again took control, but they lost it in 2001. In the final years of its existence there again was no party with a majority.

A proposal for Cumbria to become a unitary authority was made in 2007, and Cumbria went into consultation, with opposition coming from the district councils which would be abolished: Allerdale, Barrow-in-Furness, Carlisle, Copeland, Eden, and South Lakeland. In the event, the county was left out of the 2009 structural changes to local government in England.

In 2008, the county council rejected a proposal to introduce a directly elected mayor, opting instead for a cabinet-style administration that resembled the status quo. During the same year, an administration of Conservatives and Liberal Democrats collapsed, suffering not least from lacking a majority in the council. Thirty-nine Labour members and three Independents exactly equalled the total of thirty-two Conservatives and ten Liberal Democrats. A minority Labour administration then took over running the council until the June 2009 elections, when a net gain of one seat from the Independents led to the creation of a new Conservative and Labour coalition.

In 2020 the council approved Whitehaven coal mine for a third time. It will be the first deep coal mine in the UK in 30 years. The approval was widely criticised for its environmental damage and carbon emissions. Westmorland and Lonsdale MP Tim Farron described the coal mine as a "complete disaster for our children's future".

In July 2021 the Ministry of Housing, Communities and Local Government announced that in April 2023, the county would be reorganised into two unitary authorities. Cumbria County Council was to be abolished and its functions transferred to the new authorities. An eastern authority, known as Westmorland and Furness Council, now covers the former districts of Barrow-in-Furness, Eden, and South Lakeland, and a new western authority, known as Cumberland Council, covers the former districts of Allerdale, Carlisle, and Copeland.

== Elections ==
The first election to the council was held in 1973. For its first year, the council acted as a shadow authority alongside the area's outgoing authorities until the new arrangements formally came into effect on 1 April 1974. Political control of the council from 1974 until its abolition in 2023 was as follows:

Party in control	Years
No overall control	1974–1977
Conservative	1977–1981
Labour	1981–1985
No overall control	1985–1997
Labour	1997–2001
No overall control	2001–2023

Elections were held every four years on the "first past the post" system.

From boundary changes in 2001 until the council's abolition, 84 councillors were elected from 84 single-member electoral divisions.

At the June 2009 elections, the outcome was 38 Conservatives members, 24 Labour, 16 Liberal Democrats and six Independents. A Labour-Conservative coalition was formed.

Following the May 2013 elections the outcome was 35 Labour members, 26 Conservative, 16 Liberal Democrats and 7 Independents. A Labour-Lib Dem coalition was formed. Following the May 2017 elections, the outcome was 37 Conservative, 26 Labour, 16 Liberal Democrats and 5 Independents, resulting in a Labour-Lib Dem coalition with support from Independent members.

The 2021 election was postponed on 10 April 2021. In view of the council's abolition there was no election to the council in 2022.

== Notable members ==
- Tim Westoll, first chairman of the council, previously chairman of Cumberland County Council from 1959 to 1974.

== Symbols and emblems ==
Heraldic banner of Cumbria County Council

The arms of Cumbria County Council were granted by the College of Arms on 10 October 1974. The arms represent the areas from which the new county council's area was put together; the shield's green border has Parnassus flowers representing Cumberland interspersed with roses; red for Lancashire (the Furness district) on white for Yorkshire (Sedbergh is from the West Riding). The crest is a ram's head crest, found in the arms of both Westmorland County Council and Barrow County Borough, with Cumberland's Parnassus flowers again. The supporters are the legendary Dacre Bull (Cumberland) and a red dragon, redolent of Cumbria's Brittonic origin (Westmorland). They stand on a base compartment representing Hadrian's Wall (in Cumberland), crossed with two red bars (from the Westmorland arms). The county council's motto, "Ad Montes Oculos Levavi" is Latin, from Psalm 121; ("I shall lift up mine eyes unto the hills"). The county council's flag was a heraldic banner of its arms.

== See also ==
- 2009 Cumbria Council election
