= Sankey Photography Collection =

Sankey Photography Collection is a large collection of photographs that was created by two generations of photographers based in Barrow in Furness, Cumbria. The collection is currently being catalogued before being deposited in Cumbria Archives, where they will be available through their online catalogue CASCAT.

== Sankey History ==
=== Edward Sankey ===
Edward Sankey was a Barrow in Furness photographer whose work records the changing scenes of Barrow and the Lake District over a period of 50 years. Having trained as a master printer on a local newspaper, he left to start his own printing works. His first premises in Buccleuch Street were opened about 1895 with a shop selling his printed goods and also books and stationery. In the 1900s he moved to Ramsden Square and later to 88 Duke Street. By 1921 there were several retail outlets including one at 78 Duke St which sold newspapers and housed a lending library. In 1948 he moved to 81 Duke Street which was large enough to house the retail and printing sides of the business in the same building. The firm remained here until 1970. Edward retired about 1955 and died in 1965.

=== Raymond Sankey ===
Edward’s elder son Raymond joined the business in 1924 and became a capable photographer in his own right. His brother Eric was more concerned with the books and stationery part of the business. Raymond left the business for the duration of the second world war to take up a post as civil defence controller at Vickers Shipbuilding and Engineering. He took over the business around 1955 after his father’s retirement. By the early 1960s postcard sales were decreasing, but the company remained active in the production of souvenir cards for convalescing miners at Conishead Priory, then owned by the Durham Miners Welfare Committee. Demand grew for prints from the historic negatives and Raymond provided the material for several books of old photographs produced after his retirement from the retail business in 1970. These are listed in the bibliography below.

== Sankey’s patent printer ==
In the 1920s Edward Sankey designed and patented a postcard printing machine capable of producing 1000 postcards an hour. It was licensed for sale by J. Halden & Co. Its capacity enabled Sankey to print postcards for other small publishers. Postcards produced on this machine were at first marked “Sankey High Speed Machine Real Photo” on the back. The printer remained in use for over 40 years.

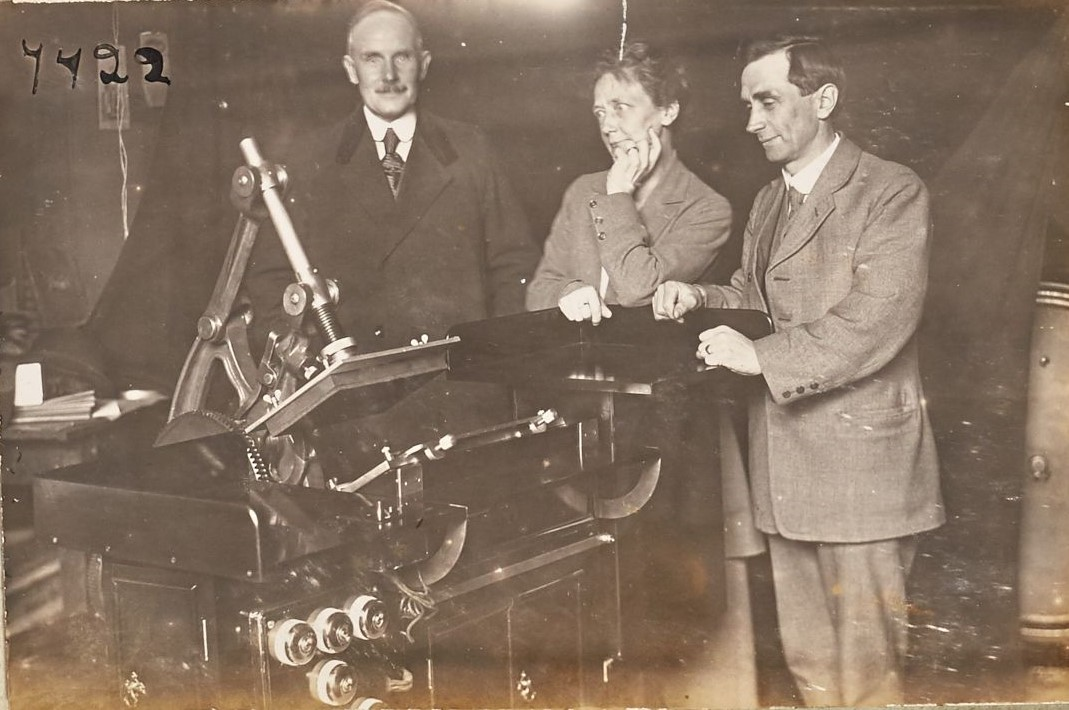
The Sankey patent postcard printing machine

== The postcard business ==
Postcards were approaching the height of their popularity at the time when Edward Sankey began printing from his own negatives. His first pictures were taken with a Sanderson half plate stand camera with an f6.3 Ross lens over which was fitted a small roller blind shutter giving “instantaneous” exposures of 1/25th and 1/50th of a second. He used “Imperial” brand glass plates which were then individually processed and contact printed at postcard size using a printing box of his own design built by his brother in law. The earliest known Sankey postcards date from about 1902.

The streets of Barrow were a frequent subject of his earlier postcards. Sporting events, hospital parades and the opening of public buildings were also popular. A good part of the photography business came from day trippers. Sankey would photograph trippers coming over from Fleetwood and have the prints ready before their return from the Lakes in the evening.

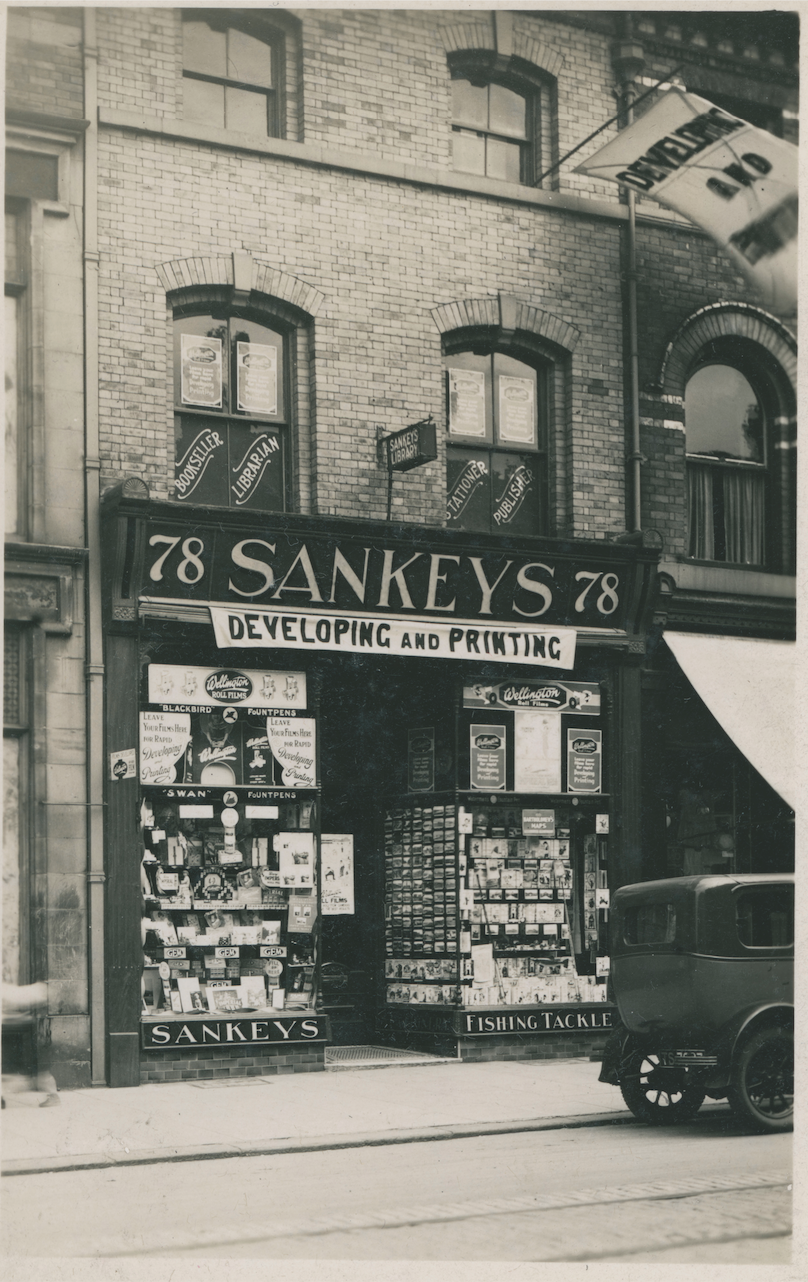
Edward Sankey's shop in Duke Street, Barrow in Furness

Edward Sankey was appointed an official photographer to the Furness Railway Company, which led to recording disasters such as the Vedra explosion of 1914 and the Millom train wreck of 1913. It also enabled him to extend his range. The “Tours Through Lakeland” series of postcards covers towns and beauty spots throughout the Lakes. The Furness Railway’s paddle steamers allowed him to reach the Fylde Coast; a large part of the collection is devoted to beach scenes from Fleetwood to Lytham. Many of the maritime photographs in the collection were taken from these steamers. The maritime albums include a large selection of the steam trawlers then sailing out of Fleetwood and the sailing trawlers which they displaced. Vickers called on Sankey to supplement their own photographers so most of the ships launched at Barrow are recorded. The first motor car owned by the business was a bull nosed Morris bought in 1925. It took the two photographers to more remote parts of the Lake District and it can be seen in some of their cards on unmade roads and in snowbound passes. At the same time lightweight folding cameras and roll film made photography possible for amateurs. Cameras and film were added to the range of goods sold in the shop and from 1930 they began a processing and developing service which continued for 40 years. Postcard production peaked at about 100,000 printed in 1938 and 1939 but the outbreak of war restricted the supply of photographic materials. It took until the mid-1950s before this level of sales was reached again. From the early 1960s, the colour postcard replaced the real photograph monochrome cards produced by the Sankeys. Photographic paper manufacturers ceased to supply the double sided paper with pre-printed back used by the autoprinter, which was replaced by a proprietary colour printing machine. There were few Sankey postcards printed after 1965. The business was wound up and the premises sold in 1970.

== The collection today ==
Raymond Sankey kept more than 15,000 negatives, mostly on glass plates, together with albums containing a copy of a large number of the postcards, and cashbooks indexing the entire collection. The negatives are in store at Carlisle Records Office and the postcard albums at Barrow Archive and Local Studies Centre. They are in the care of Cumbria Archives Service while the albums are being catalogued by Signal Film and Media

== Bibliography ==
- Raymond Sankey’s Ulverston and Furness Album, Silver Link Publishing Ltd, 1989 ISBN 0-947971-31-9
- Barrow and Morecambe Bay, Sankey, Raymond, Silver Link Publishing, 1986 ISBN 0947971076
- Furness and Cartmel: a Photographic recollection, Sankey, Raymond Dalesman publishing Co, 1976 ISBN 0852063490
- Life in Bygone Barrow Sankey, Raymond ISBN 0852068816
- The Furness Railway, Volume 1, Norman, KJ, Silver Link Publishing, 2000, ISBN 9781857941456
- The Furness Railway, a photographic recollection Sankey, Raymond and Norman, KJ, Dalesman publishing Co Ltd, 1977 ISBN 0852064241
- Maritime Heritage – Barrow and Morecambe Bay, Sankey, Raymond, Silver Link Publishing, 1986, ISBN 0947971076
- Life in Bygone Barrow, Sankey, Raymond, Dalesman 1986, ISBN 9780852068816
- South Cumbria Past and Present, Sankey, Raymond and Broughton, John, Carnforth Silver Link, 1990
- Furness Railway, a photographic recollection, Sankey, Raymond and Norman, K J, Dalesman Publishing Co, 1977, ISBN 9780852064245
- Blackpool and Fleetwood, Sankey, Raymond, Dalesman Publishing Co, 1989, ISBN 9780852069882
- Barrow in Furness, a Photographic Record, Sankey, Raymond, Dalesman Books, 1974, ISBN 9780852062241
- Barrow in Furness, a Second Photographic Recollection, Sankey, Raymond, Dalesman Books, 1978,
- South Cumbria Past and Present, Broughton, John, Silver Link Publishing, 1990, ISBN 9780947971472
