= Anna Dean =

British fiction writer

Anna Dean, the pseudonym for writer Marian Veevers (born 1956), is the listed author of the Dido Kent series of mystery novels.

== Biography ==
Marian Veevers was born in Cumberland (now part of Cumbria) in England in 1956. She moved to the Midlands as a child but as she grew older she became determined to return to the Lake District and, after a few years living in Wales, she moved back to Cumbria in 1984. She lives near Ambleside with her husband.

Veevers has worked as an assistant to a psychologist, she has worked for the National Trust, she has taught Creative Writing and worked for the Wordsworth Trust at Grasmere in the Lake District. The one constant throughout her life has been her writing. She has said,

“I write compulsively. It all started with a mistake. When I was taught to write at the age of five I assumed that I must write books. By the time I realised my mistake and understood that it was not actually compulsory to create stories - the habit was too deeply ingrained to give up.”

Veevers has an MA in Creative Writing.

== Literary career ==
Veevers adopted the pen name “Anna Dean” for the Dido Kent series of historical crime novels set in the Regency period – the time of Jane Austen.

Under her ‘real name’, Veevers has published an historical novel, ‘Bloodlines’ in 1996 and has also written short stories and monologues for BBC Radio 4 and BBC Radio Cumbria. In 2017, she published 'Jane and Dorothy: A True Tale of Sense and Sensibility', which compares the lives of Jane Austen and Dorothy Wordsworth.

The Dido Kent mysteries are written partly in the form of letters and Veevers has a particular interest in old letters and documents. In 2002–2003, she worked as Writer in Residence for the Cumbria Archive Service where she developed the use of archive material as a source for creative writing.

== Bibliography ==
As Anna Dean:

- A Moment of Silence (2008) Published in the US as Bellfield Hall (2010)
- A Gentleman of Fortune (2009)
- A Woman of Consequence (2010)
- A Place of Confinement (2012)

As Marian Veevers:

- Bloodlines (1996)
- Voices from the Archives (2003)
- Jane and Dorothy: A True Tale of Sense and Sensibility (2017)
