= South Lakes Safari Zoo =

- Interactive map of South Lakes Safari Zoo
- 54.1666°N 3.1686°W
- Date opened: 28 May 1994
- Location: Dalton-in-Furness, Cumbria, England
- Land area: 51-acre (21 ha)
- No. of animals: 1,000+ (pre expansion)
- No. of species: 150+ (pre expansion)
- Memberships: EAZA
- Website: southlakessafarizoo.com

South Lakes Safari Zoo (formerly South Lakes Wild Animal Park) was a 51-acre (21 ha) zoo established in 1994 by David Gill, and located in Cumbria, England. Its name refers to its proximity to the Lake District, though it lies entirely within the Borough of Barrow-in-Furness on the outskirts of Dalton.

After an initial rapid growth, the zoo became one of Cumbria's most successful tourist attractions. However, under Gill's ownership the zoo had a number of controversies, emerging both from his personal life and his management of the zoo. Significant concerns over animal welfare and the death of an employee eventually led to Gill losing his license to operate the zoo in 2017.

The zoo closed permanently in December 2024 with animals expected to be re-homed in the new year.

== Ownership ==
Since 2017 the zoo has been operated by Cumbria Zoo Company Ltd, of which Karen Brewer is the manager. Prior to this, it had been operated by its founder, David S. Gill. Gill retained ownership of the land on which the zoo sits until January 2021 when it was sold to the Zoo Investment Company. In 2018 his company was placed into administration following financial difficulties.

=== Founder ===
David Gill founded the zoo in 1994 on converted farmland. In 2001, Gill relocated to Australia, opening a second zoo in North Queensland; however, following its closure in 2005 with debts of more than £2 million, he returned to be based at the South Lakes Zoo.

In 2007, Gill stood for election for the local Borough of Barrow-in-Furness council representing the Conservative Party, but narrowly lost out. In 2008, he was stabbed in his home on the edge of the zoo by Richard Creary, a former professional rugby league footballer, who found him in bed with his wife. Creary admitted aggravated burglary and was jailed for five years. Gill later entered into a relationship with Frieda Rivera-Schreiber, who worked as a veterinary coordinator at the zoo after her 2014 marriage to Gill, despite being ineligible to operate on animals in the UK as she is not associated with the Royal College of Veterinary Surgeons. An inspector's report noted that "The provision of veterinary care [at the zoo] ... has historically been poor", and her position as veterinary coordinator came under question. Until 2015, Gill also operated a "dude ranch" in Wyoming, United States, which charged guests up to £1,627 per week to pretend to be cowboys. Following the legalisation of same-sex marriage, Gill garnered controversy when he described same-sex marriage as "sick" and commented that "the end is certainly nigh ... when nature is twisted and society accepts totally abnormal and anti natural [sic] behaviours in humans" on Facebook. Cumbria Police investigated the comments for alleged homophobia. Gill told his life story, with co-author Paul Stenning in a 600 page memoir, titled Nine Lives and released in 2011.

== History ==
=== 1994–2000: Opening and expansion ===
The zoo was opened by David S Gill and his family in 1994 on converted farmland. Construction started in 1993, and the park was officially opened on 28 May 1994. The park gradually expanded over the next few years, growing from 55,000 visitors in 1995 to 220,000 visitors in 1999. Major attractions in early years included its then-unique in Britain holding of the world's smallest (Sumatran) and largest (Siberian) tiger subspecies. It created a successful breeding programme for the critically endangered Sumatran tiger. The zoo had its first major incident in 1997, when a three-ton white rhino escaped from its pen and was subsequently shot dead by owner David Gill in an adjacent field. Gill was later fined £10,000 for failing to keep the animal adequately enclosed.

=== 2001–2012: Continued growth and disputes ===
In 2001, Lara Kitson, a pregnant employee of the zoo, won a case of sexual discrimination and constructive dismissal at a tribunal in Carlisle after she claimed that she was advised to terminate her pregnancy rather than fall short in her job. The park continued to grow, with a wider range of African animals, penguins and a cheetah coming to the park in the early 2000s. In 2004, the park's owner David Gill first suggested moving the park away from its site in Dalton to one closer to the M6 in south-eastern Cumbria. In 2006, a car-park was constructed to cope with the zoo's expansion, though without planning permission: after a long struggle with Barrow-in-Furness Borough Council, permission was eventually granted in 2007 following a complaint by Gill to the Secretary of State for Communities and Local Government, who heavily criticised the Council. In 2006, the park itself was also criticised by inspectors following the escapes of lemurs and a coyote. In August 2007, Gill was stabbed in his home next to the zoo by Richard Creary, the estranged husband of his then-partner: Creary was later jailed for five years for stabbing Mr Gill in the neck.

2008 would be equally eventful for the park. The introduction of female rhinos led to the birth of white rhino Nyala at the park born on 1 June 2008, and Zimba, on 11 September 2008. In the same year, 31 of the park's 120 lemurs died in a fire. The fire destroyed three of the wooden huts in which they were enclosed. A spokesman for the fire service said it was believed the lemurs died as a result of smoke inhalation, and park owner David Gill said that the fire was probably caused by a faulty electrical heater. The lemurs were usually allowed to roam the park at night, but had been enclosed because of the cold weather. Gill was able to save 13, including the belted ruffed and Alaotran gentle species, but many of ring tailed, red ruffed, white-fronted, and black species died in the blaze. Gill said that for staff, who knew many of the lemurs by name, the loss was "devastating", and also that the deaths were "not just a massive blow for the park but for the European Breeding Programmes the animals were involved with." In the same year, Gill once again threatened to leave the zoo's Dalton site, following further conflict with the Council. Gill again stood unsuccessfully for election, losing by one vote.

In May 2009, the zoo announced an expansion plan that would increase the park size from 17 acres (6.9 ha) to about 51 acres (21 ha). The expansion was required in order to introduce new species of animals, and create larger enclosures for the animals at the zoo. Added revenues helped the zoo increase its donations to its two conservation charities. Plans for the expansion were initially rejected by Barrow Borough Council's planning committee in 2010, largely due to concerns about traffic problems due to the proposed new entrance from the U6097, a minor road off the A590. After an appeal to the Planning Inspectorate, the expansion was approved in February 2012. Following work to the road, work began on expansion to the park in 2014. In 2013, the zoo was renamed the South Lakes Safari Zoo.

=== 2013–2017: Death of Sarah McClay and concerns over animal welfare ===
On 24 May 2013, Sarah McClay, a 24-year-old woman who had been working at the park, was mauled by a tiger during public feeding time and suffered serious injuries to her head and neck. She died later the same day at the Royal Preston Hospital. Gill initially appeared to blame McClay for the incident. A statement issued by the Cumbria Police said that there was no suggestion of any foul play or any issue of suicide or self-harm. In 2014, during the investigation an environmental officer from Barrow Borough Council stated that a bolt on the door between the dark den and the keepers' corridor was found to be defective after the attack. A "narrative verdict" was delivered in 2014 at the inquest into McClay's death, stating that she had entered the enclosure but that it was not at that time possible to determine how this had happened. In June 2016, the zoo pleaded guilty to breaches of Health and Safety at Work etc. Act 1974, for failing to maintain the bolt and for allowing the door to be unlocked. Gill was acquitted of personal charges of negligence. The Zoo was fined £450,000 for its breaches a few days later.

Alongside the death of McClay, the zoo continued to have several other incidents. In 2015 David Gill received an official warning, after Barrow Borough Council considered closing the park as a result of a flock of sacred ibis escaping in July and October 2013. 13 to 18 of the birds were shot, and Gill was found guilty of three offences of allowing a protected animal under the Wildlife and Countryside Act 1981 to escape into the wild. The birds are harmful to British fauna, and have been viewed as an invasive species within Britain. This conviction formed part of the reason as to why Gill's licence was not renewed in 2017, according to the head of Barrow Borough Council's licensing subcommittee. In the same year local media covered sightings of two capuchin monkeys that also escaped from the zoo.

On 17 December 2015 it was announced via the park's Facebook page that it would be closing as of 9 January 2016. Park management stated this was due to ongoing disagreements with Barrow Borough Council including concerns over the safety of the park's walkways. This, alongside two other issues, was the subject of discussion during a meeting by the Council's Regulatory Licensing Committee. The decision was reversed in January 2016, with the zoo staying open while the walkways were repaired. At the same time, park owner David Gill announced his intention to retire from his managerial position, handing over responsibility to the Safari Zoo Nature Foundation. The zoo was transferred in May 2016, before a report for the Barrow council zoo licensing committee in July 2016 criticised Gill and the park for "out-of-date practices", and the deaths of over 100 animals, including some from hypothermia. The Zoo was subsequently refused a licence, with Gill again suggesting a move to a site in South Lakeland District Council. The zoo remained open while appealing the licensing decision, and Gill initially followed his previous statement and stood down in order to transfer running of the Zoo to a management team, before being reappointed as director at the end of July 2016. Gill reapplied for a licence in November 2016, although inspectors in the same month said that giraffes at the park were at danger of dying due to inadequate facilities. At the same time, a separate licence application was received from Cumbria Zoo Company Ltd, a company led by Karen Brewer, a director to whom Gill had promised to pass control.

A report to Barrow Borough Council's licensing committee was released on 27 February 2017 ahead of a final decision over the licence. The report contained a long list of concerns about animal welfare, including over 500 animal deaths in four years (12% of its animals per year). The deaths included an African spurred tortoise dying after being electrocuted in fencing, the decomposing body of a squirrel monkey being found behind a radiator, a leopard tortoise dying from the cold, two snow leopards found partially eaten in their enclosure, a white ruffed lemur killed after accessing the wolf enclosure, lions and baboons euthanized due to a lack of space to keep the animals, and a jaguar euthanised after it chewed off its own paw. The Captive Animals' Protection Society (CAPS), who called South Lakes one of the worst zoos it had ever seen, stated that many of these deaths were preventable. A number of animals had "died from exposure, emaciation, hypothermia and had even been run over."

On 6 March 2017, Barrow Borough Council refused to grant Gill a licence renewal, though the zoo remained in business while the Cumbria Zoo Ltd licence application was assessed. Over 10,000 people online signed an e-petition urging the council not to grant approval to Gill. The licence application of Cumbria Zoo Company Ltd was heard in May 2017, and the new operators were granted a licence, following a report that inspectors were “impressed and highly encouraged by the improvements made".

=== 2017–2024: New ownership and closure ===
In January 2018, the RSPCA ended its investigations into the Zoo, happy that the new owners had made significant improvements to it. The Zoo was the subject of a BBC Two programme 'Trouble at the Zoo' on 8 February 2018, which documented the new managements efforts to reform the zoo. A further inspection in May 2018 was satisfied that further improvements had been achieved, with a "marked improvement" in animal welfare.

In 2024, the zoo announced its closure for December 31st of that year. The zoo plans to continue to care for the animals until new homes can be found for them.
