= Flag of Cumbria =

Flag of English county

- Proportion: 3:5
- Adopted: 5 September 2025
- Design: Green and gold chevrons on a blue field with a gold crown above
- Designed by: Ben Walker

The flag of Cumbria is a community flag designed to represent the English ceremonial county of Cumbria. It was chosen following a competition and public vote in 2025, and is intended to be an emblem for the county that can be freely used by any individual or organisation.

== Design and symbolism ==
The field of the flag is blue. There are three green triangles at the base, above which are three zigzags in the order gold, green, gold. The top third contains a gold ancient crown in the centre.

The vexillologist Philip Tibbets, speaking at the ceremony to reveal the flag, stated that the zig-zags represent the rugged Cumbrian landscape. He also said that the crown represents the area's history as a kingdom in its own right, that Scafell Pike is the tallest English mountain, and that the area around Alston in the east of the county is the "roof of England".

The Pantone colours for the flag are:

- Blue 280
- Yellow 123
- Green 356
- Gold 1235

== History and use ==
The flag was chosen in September 2025 following a competition and public vote. The competition was held in March and April 2025 and attracted nearly 200 entries. A panel of judges including representatives of the Lord Lieutenant of Cumbria and Carlisle Cathedral shortlisted six designs, which were then put to a public vote. The winner of the vote was announced on 6 September 2025 at a ceremony at Carlisle Cathedral, and the new flag flown from the cathedral tower.

The flag is intended to be used by "everyone who chooses to embrace it”, and has been described by the lord-lieutenant's office as "for everyone, a public emblem anyone can use, from schools and sports teams to local businesses and individuals." This is in contrast to flags based on coats of arms, which are restricted in use.

== Competition finalists ==
The five non-winning finalists of the competition to decide the flag were:

Design	Flag	Symbolism
B: Janice Brown		The two crossed swords symbolise Cumbria's position on a contested border and the conflict of the Border Reivers. The checkered background of red and white (the colours of England) represent the patchwork of communities in the area, and the stones that make up Hadrian's Wall and the peace and bloodshed associated with it.
C: Chris Brown		The wyvern is a reference to the Welsh origins of the name "Cumbria" and also to the various dragon legends and symbols associated with the region. The blue and green stripes symbolise the region's landscape, with the dragon being coloured gold to contrast against them.
D: Daniel Greenwood Mason and James Hodgson		The design is a simplified form of the banner of arms of the former Cumbria County Council. The zig-zags represent the landscape of the county.
E: Shaun Toal		The black cross on white is a reference to the arms of the Diocese of Carlisle, to the cross of the English flag, and to the crosses used by the Celtic regions of Cornwall, Brittany, and Wales. The Celtic cross shape and central triskelion are another reference to the Celtic heritage of the region.
F: Gavin Chapman		The yellow disk symbolises the Three Shire Stone, which marks the point where the boundaries of the historic counties of Cumberland, Westmorland, and Lancashire converge.

== See also ==
The flags which represent Cumbria's predecessors:

- Flag of Cumberland
- Flag of Westmorland
- Flag of Lancashire
- Flag of Yorkshire
