= Cumbria Archive Service =

English archive service

Cumbria Archive Service was established to serve the English county of Cumbria. Rather than having just one county record office, Cumbria County Council operated four local record offices, now known as archive centres, in Barrow-in-Furness, Carlisle, Kendal and Whitehaven.

On 1 April 2023, the county council and 6 district councils were abolished. In their place two new councils were created, with local government functions transferred to the two new unitary authorities: Cumberland Council and Westmorland and Furness Council.

== The four archive centres ==
Carlisle Archive Centre was officially opened in 1962, although archives had been collected before that date and archive staff had been appointed from c.1944 onwards. For many years, it operated from the Alma Block within the grounds of Carlisle Castle. It moved to newly converted premises at Petteril Bank House, on the south side of the city and about two miles from its centre, in 2011. Important collections include family and estate records of the Earls of Lonsdale from the 12th-20th centuries. The staff provide administrative assistance for the Egremont Estate Office at Cockermouth Castle.

Kendal Archive Centre was also established in 1962 under a joint archives committee for the former counties of Cumberland and Westmorland and the City of Carlisle. Few archives other than local authority records had been collected before this date. As at 2024 the office operates from the County Offices in the town, but the long-term use of this 1930s building is uncertain, as the new unitary authority will close the building on 30 September 2024, and the Centre will then be closed to the public for an indeterminate period. Important collections include Appleby Castle estate records (containing papers relating to Lady Anne Clifford, 1590-1676), and the business records of Thomas Mawson, landscape architect, 19th-20th centuries.

Barrow Archive Centre was opened in purpose-built premises in 1979 (following local government reorganisation and the creation of the new county of Cumbria). Records had been collected locally in temporary premises at Dalton-in-Furness since 1975 and the new office also absorbed records from the Furness Collection, gathered from 1948 onwards by the Central Library in Barrow. Following building extensions the record office joined with the local studies library in 1998 to provide a unified service within a joint search room. Important collections include records from the Furness estate office of the Duke of Buccleuch.

Whitehaven Archive and Local Studies Centre was officially opened within specially converted premises in August 1996. It collects archives mainly from the south and west portions of the former county of Cumberland.

All four archive centres are recognised by the Lord Chancellor as places of deposit for public records. They are also designated as diocesan record offices by the Bishop of Carlisle. A specialist unit for the conservation and repair of records operates from within the archive centre at Petteril Bank House, Carlisle.

== See also ==
- Anna Dean
