= Gary McKee =

British marathon runner

Gary McKee (also known as Marathon Man) is a marathon runner and fund raiser who ran a marathon every day of 2022.

== Personal life ==
He was born in Cumbria to Victor McKee. He is 53 years old and lives in Cleator Moor. He routinely woke at 5 am to run his marathon, before starting work at 2 pm. On 23 June 1997, his father was diagnosed with cancer. His father died in 2005 from an unrelated illness. In October 2017, he was honoured with Freedom of Copeland by Copeland Borough Council. He is married to Susan McKee and father of three children, Alfie, Beau, and Minnie. In honor to him, Ennerdale Brewery of Cumbria has created a beer named Marathon Man.

== Running ==
He started his run on 1 January 2022 and has run 365 marathons in the year 2022. He has raised more than 1 million pounds to Macmillan Cancer Support and West Cumbria Hospice at Home. He has run more than 9,500 miles. He began his mission at 8:30 GMT and finished it at 14:00 GMT. Kevin Sinfield said that his challenge is “mind-blowing”. He ran 26.2 miles each day. He has run from Cleator Moor to London.

== Milestones ==
He started his challenge on 1 January 2022. On February 19, 2022, he completed his 50th run. On 12 March 2022, St Gregory & St Patrick's Catholic Infant School raised 3,658 pounds to him. On 10 April 2022, he completed his 100th run. On 27 October 2022, he completed his 300th run. On 20 December 2022, Kevin Sinfield joined him. On 30 December 2022, Sellafield Ltd donated 55,000 pounds to him.
