= Cumbria =

Ceremonial county of England

- Ceremonial county
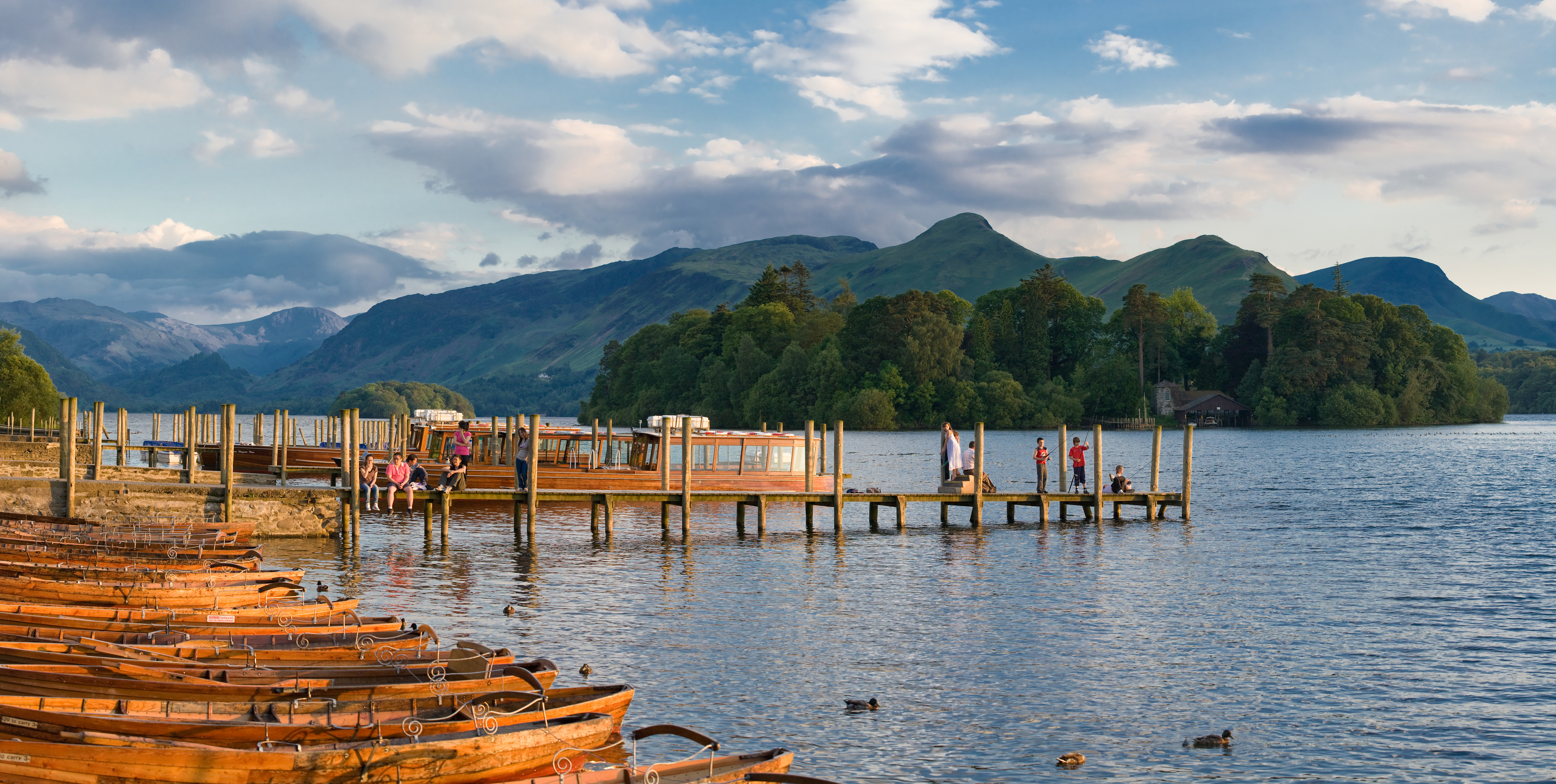
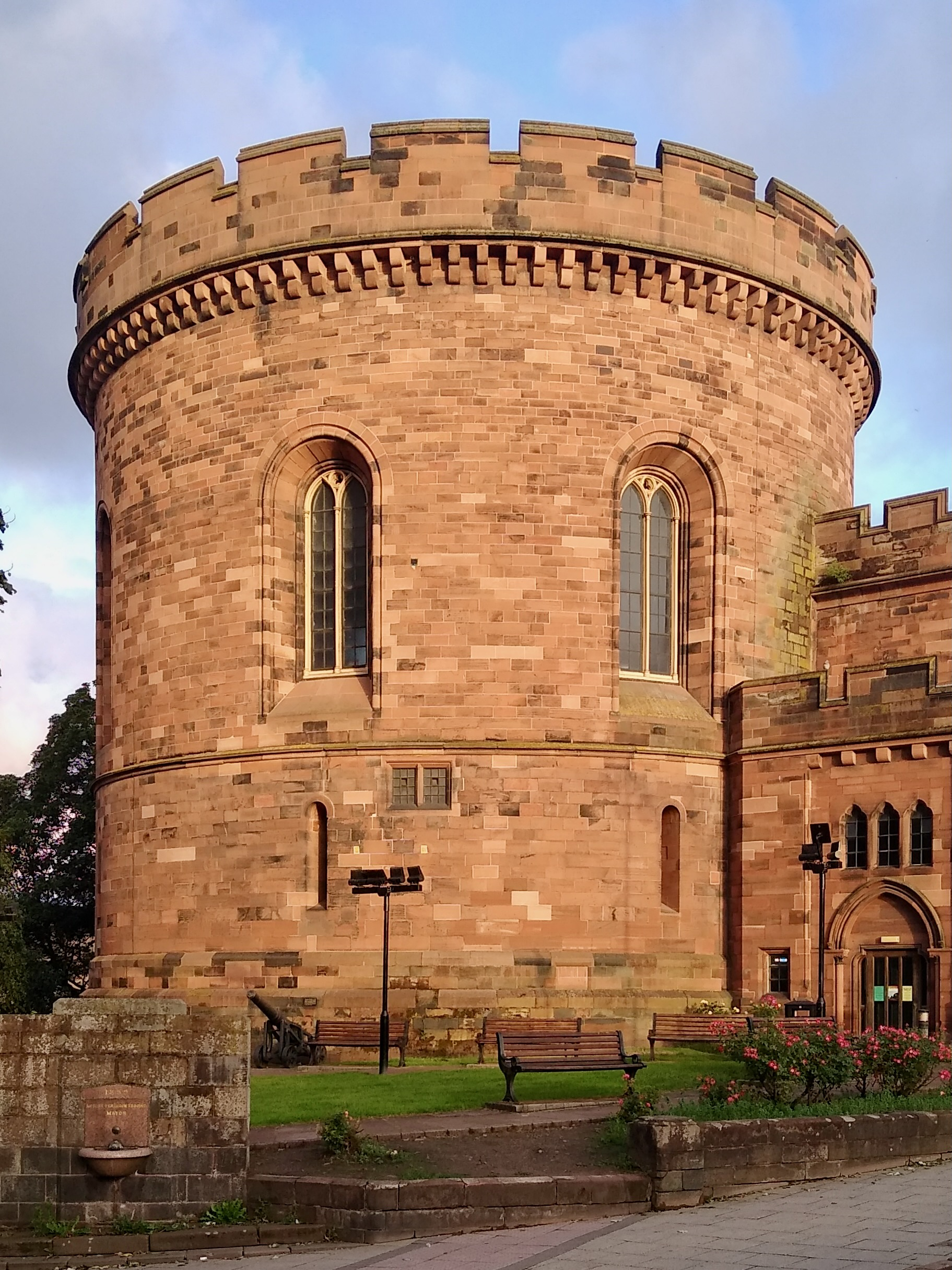
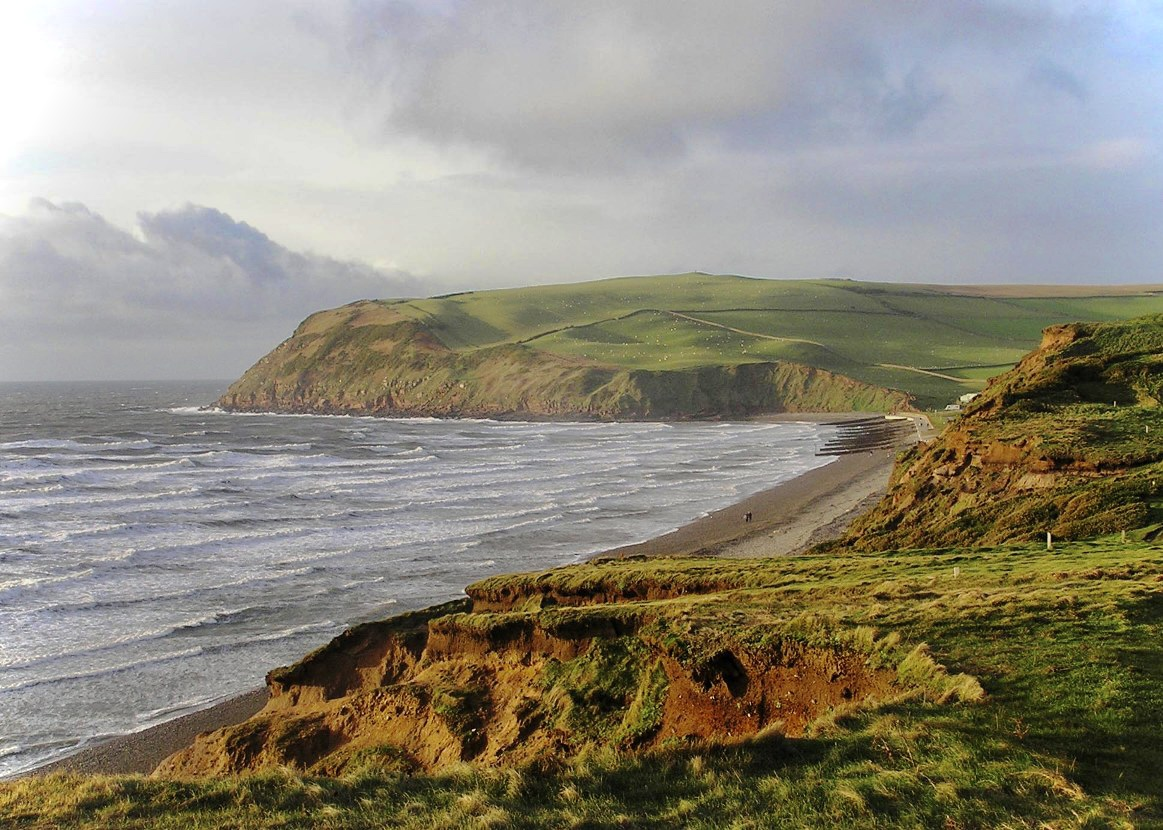
- Derwentwater in the Lake District, a tower of Carlisle Citadel and St Bees Head

- Location of Cumbria within England
- Coordinates: 54°30′N 3°15′W
- Sovereign state: United Kingdom
- Constituent country: England
- Region: North West England
- Established: 1 April 1974
- Established by: Local Government Act 1972
- Time zone: UTC+0 (GMT)
  - Summer (DST): UTC+1 (BST)
- UK Parliament: 6 MPs (Note: Morecambe and Lunesdale, represented in the House of Commons by Lizzi Collinge, is a cross-county constituency with Lancashire.): Markus Campbell-Savours (L); Lizzi Collinge (L); Tim Farron (LD); Josh MacAlister (L); Julie Minns (L); Michelle Scrogham (L)
- Police: Cumbria Constabulary
- Largest city: Carlisle
- Ceremonial county
- Lord Lieutenant: Alexander Scott
- High Sheriff: Shirley Fawcett
- Area: 6,768 km^{2} (2,613 sq mi)
  - Rank: 3rd of 48
- Population (2024): 510,680
  - Rank: 42nd of 48
  - Density: 75/km^{2} (190/sq mi)
- Districts
- Districts of Cumbria; Unitary
- Districts: 1. Cumberland; 2. Westmorland and Furness

Cumbria (/ˈkʌmbriə/ KUM-bree-ə) is a ceremonial county in North West England. It borders the Scottish council areas of Dumfries and Galloway and Scottish Borders to the north; the English ceremonial counties of Northumberland and County Durham to the east, North Yorkshire to the south-east, and Lancashire to the south; and the Irish Sea to the west. Its largest settlement is the city of Carlisle.

Cumbria is predominantly rural, with an area of 6,769 km^{2} (2,614 sq mi) and an estimated population of 510,680 in 2024. Carlisle is in the north of the county; the towns of Workington and Whitehaven lie on the west coast, Barrow-in-Furness on the south coast, and Penrith and Kendal in the east. For local government purposes the county comprises two unitary authority areas, Westmorland and Furness and Cumberland, established in April 2023. Both councils are constituent members of the Cumbria Combined Authority which was established in February 2026. Cumbria was created in 1974 from Cumberland, Westmorland, the Furness area of Lancashire, and a small part of Yorkshire.

The interior of Cumbria contains several upland areas. Together they fringe the Vale of Eden, the wide valley of the River Eden, which runs south-east to north-west across the county and broadens into the Solway Plain near Carlisle. To the north-east are part of the Border Moors, and to the east part of the North Pennines; the latter have been designated a national landscape. South of the vale are the Orton Fells, Howgill Fells, and part of the Yorkshire Dales, which are all within the Yorkshire Dales national park. The south-west contains the Lake District, a large upland area which has been designated a national park and UNESCO World Heritage Site. It includes England's highest mountain, Scafell Pike; its longest and largest lake, Windermere; and its deepest lake, Wast Water. The county has a long coast to the west which is bordered by a plain for most of its length. The north-west coast is part of the Solway Firth, a national landscape, and the south coast includes the Cartmel and Furness peninsulas. East of the peninsulas, the county contains part of Arnside and Silverdale, another national landscape.

The county contains several Neolithic monuments, such as Mayburgh Henge. The region was on the border of Roman Britain, and Hadrian's Wall runs through the north of the county. In the Early Middle Ages parts of the region successively belonged to Rheged, Northumbria, and Strathclyde, and there was also a Viking presence. It became the border between England and Scotland, and was unsettled until the Union of the Crowns in 1603. During the Industrial Revolution mining took place on the Cumberland coalfield and Barrow-in-Furness became a shipbuilding centre, but the county was not heavily industrialised and the Lake District became valued for its sublime and picturesque qualities, notably by the Lake Poets.

== Toponymy ==
The place names Cumbria and Cumberland both mean "land of the Cumbrians" and are names derived from the term that had been used by the inhabitants of the area to describe themselves. In the period c. 400 – c. 1100, it is likely that any group of people living in Britain who identified as 'Britons' called themselves by a name similar to 'Cum-ri' which means "fellow countrymen" (and has also survived in the Welsh name for Wales which is Cymru). The first datable record of the place name as Cumberland is from an entry in the Anglo-Saxon Chronicle for the year AD 945. This record refers to a kingdom known to the Anglo-Saxons as Cumbraland and in Latin as Cumbria, often also known as Strathclyde, which in the 10th century may have stretched from Loch Lomond to Leeds. The first king to be unequivocally described as king of the Cumbrians is Owain ap Dyfnwal, who ruled from c. 915 – c. 937.

== History ==
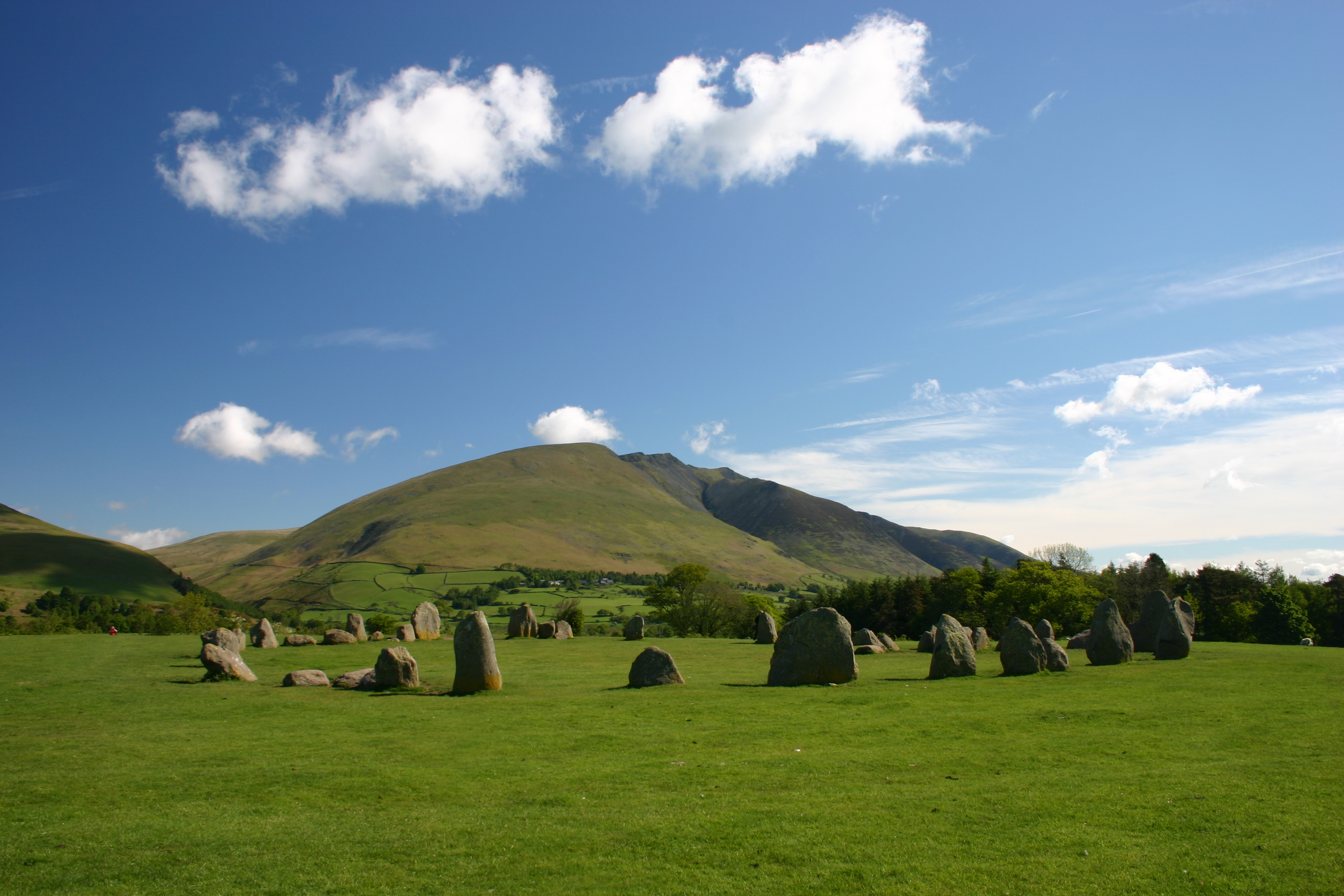
The Castlerigg stone circle dates from the late Neolithic age and was constructed by some of the earliest inhabitants of Cumbria

During the Neolithic period what is now Cumbria area contained an important centre of stone axe production (the so-called Langdale axe factory), products of which have been found across Great Britain. During this period, stone circles and henges were built across the county, and today, Cumbria has one of the largest number of preserved field monuments in England'.

While not part of the region conquered in the Romans' initial conquest of Britain in AD 43, most of modern-day Cumbria was later conquered in response to a revolt deposing the Roman-aligned ruler of the Brigantes in AD 69. The Romans built a number of fortifications in the area during their occupation, the most famous being UNESCO World Heritage Site Hadrian's Wall which passes through northern Cumbria.

At the end of the period of British history known as Roman Britain (c. AD 410) the inhabitants of Cumbria were Cumbric-speaking native Celtic Britons who were probably descendants of the Brigantes and Carvetii (sometimes considered to be a sub-tribe of the Brigantes) that the Roman Empire had conquered in about AD 85. Based on inscriptional evidence from the area, the Roman civitas of the Carvetii seems to have covered portions of Cumbria. The names Cumbria, Cymru (the native Welsh name for Wales), Cambria, and Cumberland are derived from the name these people gave themselves, *kombroges in Common Brittonic, which originally meant "compatriots".

Although Cumbria was previously believed to have formed the core of the Early Middle Ages Brittonic kingdom of Rheged, more recent discoveries near Galloway appear to contradict this. For the rest of the first millennium, Cumbria was contested by several entities who warred over the area, including the Brythonic Celtic Kingdom of Strathclyde and the Anglian Kingdom of Northumbria. Most of modern-day Cumbria was a principality in the Kingdom of Scotland at the time of the Norman Conquest of England in 1066 and thus was excluded from the Domesday Book survey of 1086.

In 1092 the region was invaded by William II and incorporated into England. In 1133 the diocese of Carlisle was founded, cementing Cumbria's position within the English church. Cumbria left Scottish hands for the last time in 1157. Nevertheless, the region was dominated by the many Anglo-Scottish Wars of the latter Middle Ages and early modern period and the associated Border Reivers who exploited the dynamic political situation of the region. There were at least three sieges of Carlisle fought between England and Scotland, and two further sieges during the Jacobite risings.

After the Jacobite Risings of the 18th century, Cumbria became a more stable place and, as in the rest of Northern England, the Industrial Revolution caused a large growth in urban populations. In particular, the west coast towns of Workington, Millom and Barrow-in-Furness saw large iron and steel mills develop, with Barrow also developing a significant shipbuilding industry. Kendal, Keswick and Carlisle all became mill towns, with textiles, pencils and biscuits among the products manufactured in the region.

The early 19th century saw the county gain fame when the Lake Poets and other artists of the Romantic movement, such as William Wordsworth and Samuel Taylor Coleridge, lived among, and were inspired by, the lakes and mountains of the region. Later, the children's writer Beatrix Potter wrote in the region and became a major landowner, granting much of her property to the National Trust on her death. The large amount of land owned by the National Trust assisted in the formation in 1951 of the Lake District National Park, which remains the largest National Park in England and has come to dominate the identity and economy of the county.

The Windscale fire of 10 October 1957 was the worst nuclear accident in Great Britain's history.

Cumbria was created in 1974 from the administrative counties of Cumberland and Westmorland; the county boroughs of Carlisle and Barrow-in-Furness; the districts of North Lonsdale, Grange, Ulverston, and Dalton-in-Furness from Lancashire; and the Sedbergh Rural District from the West Riding of Yorkshire. Cumbria County Council and the seven district councils were abolished in 2023 and replaced by two new unitary authorities, Cumberland Council and Westmorland and Furness Council.

On 2 June 2010, taxi driver Derrick Bird killed 12 people and injured 11 others in a shooting spree that spanned over 24 kilometres (15 mi) along the Cumbrian coastline.

== Geography ==
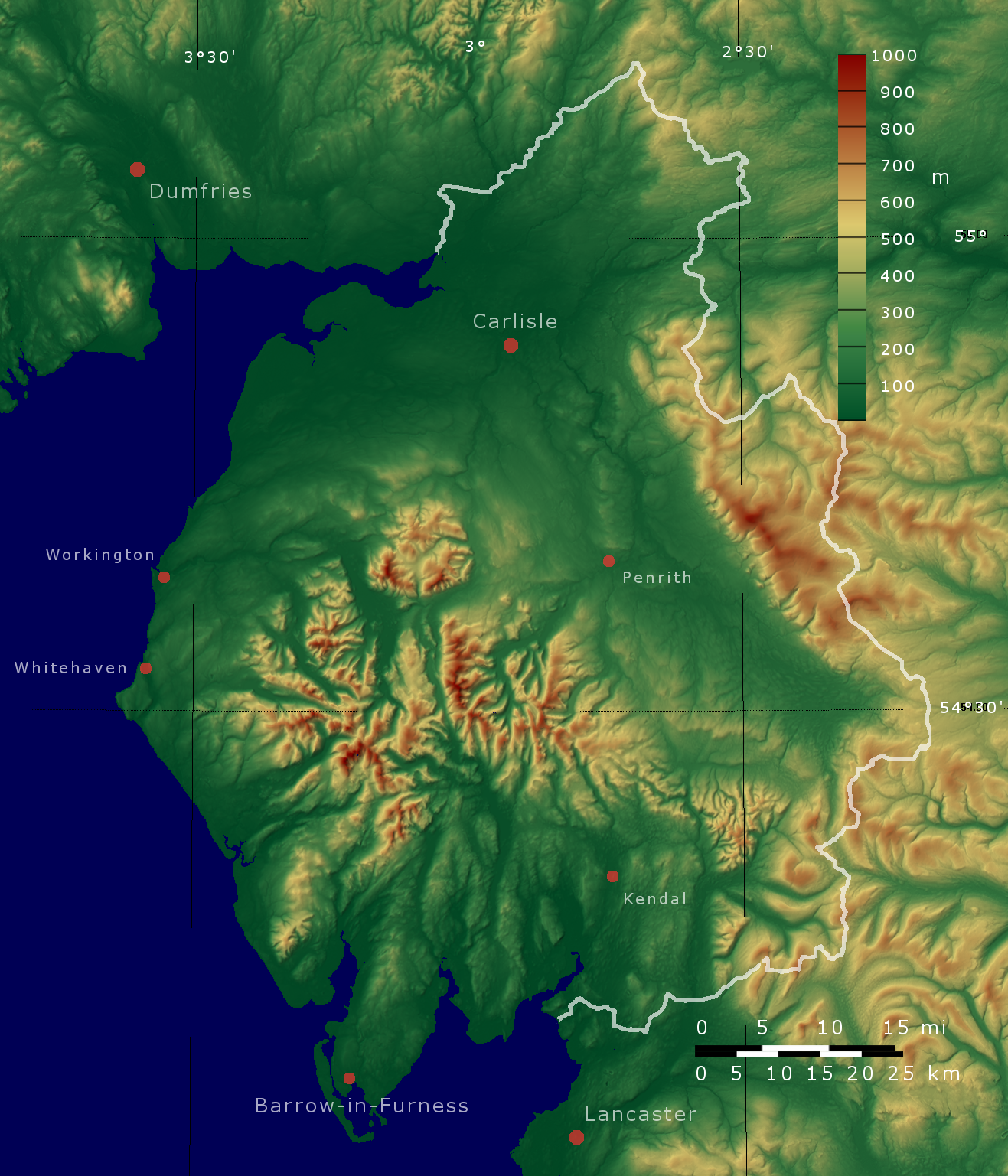
A topographic map of Cumbria

Cumbria is the most northwesterly ceremonial county of England and is mostly mountainous, with large upland areas to the south-west and east. The south-west contains the Lake District, a national park and UNESCO world heritage site which includes Scafell Pike, England's highest mountain at 978 metres (3,209 ft), and Windermere, its longest and largest lake. The Border Moors and North Pennines lie along the county's eastern border. The south-east contains the Orton Fells, Howgill Fells and part of the Yorkshire Dales, which are all within the Yorkshire Dales national park.

The Vale of Eden, the valley of the River Eden, runs south-east to north-west between these upland areas, and broadens into the Solway Plain near Carlisle. The county has long coast to the west, which is bordered by a plain for most of its length. In the north-west it borders the Solway Firth, a national landscape, and to the south are the Cartmel and Furness peninsulas.

East of the peninsulas, the county contains part of Arnside and Silverdale, also a national landscape. The Lancaster Canal runs from Preston into southern Cumbria and is partly in use. The Ulverston Canal which once reached to Morecambe Bay is maintained although it was closed in 1945.

The county contains a number of Sites of Special Scientific Interest, several of which are grouped into the Lake District High Fells, which is a designated Special Area of Conservation.

=== Boundaries and divisions ===
The northernmost and southernmost points in Cumbria are just west of Deadwater, Northumberland and South Walney respectively. Kirkby Stephen (close to Tan Hill, North Yorkshire) and St Bees Head are the most easterly and westerly points of the county. The boundaries are along the Irish Sea to Morecambe Bay in the west, and along the Pennines to the east. Cumbria's northern boundary stretches from the Solway Firth from the Solway Plain eastward along the border with Scotland.

Cumbria is bordered by Northumberland, County Durham, North Yorkshire, Lancashire in England, and Dumfries and Roxburgh, Ettrick and Lauderdale in Scotland.

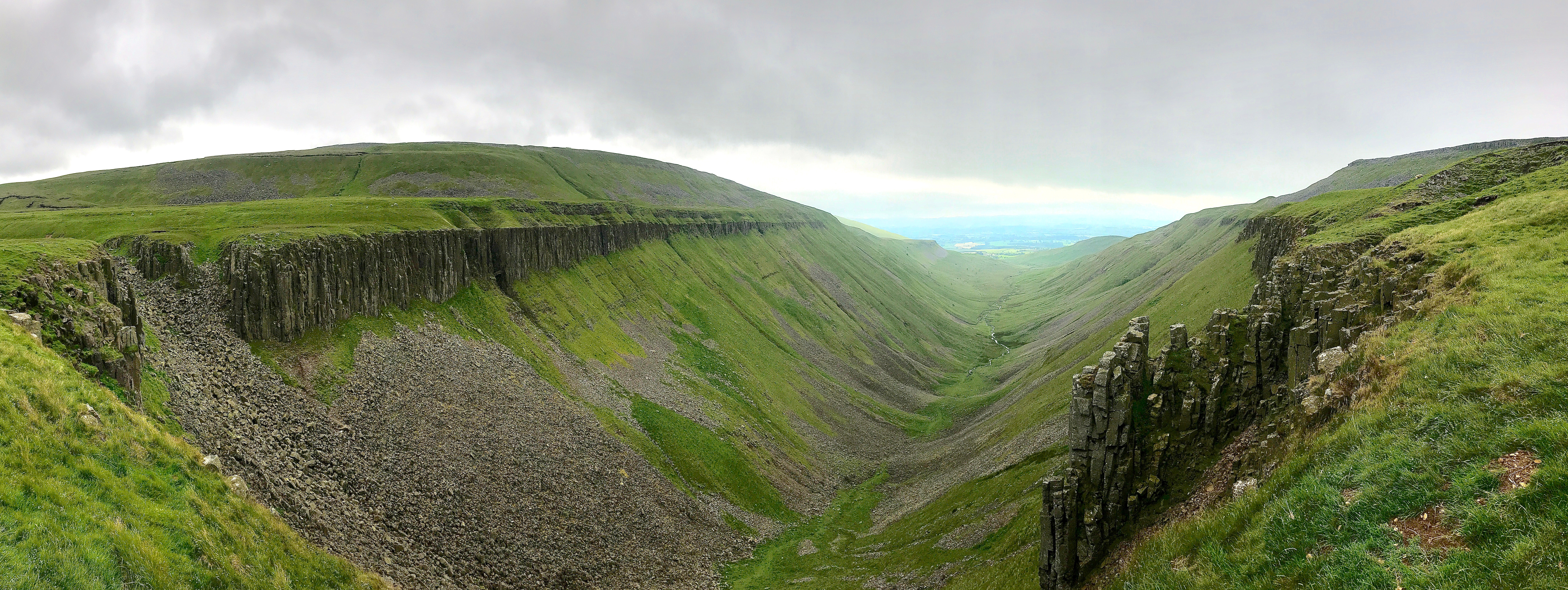
High Cup Nick, in the North Pennines

== Economy ==
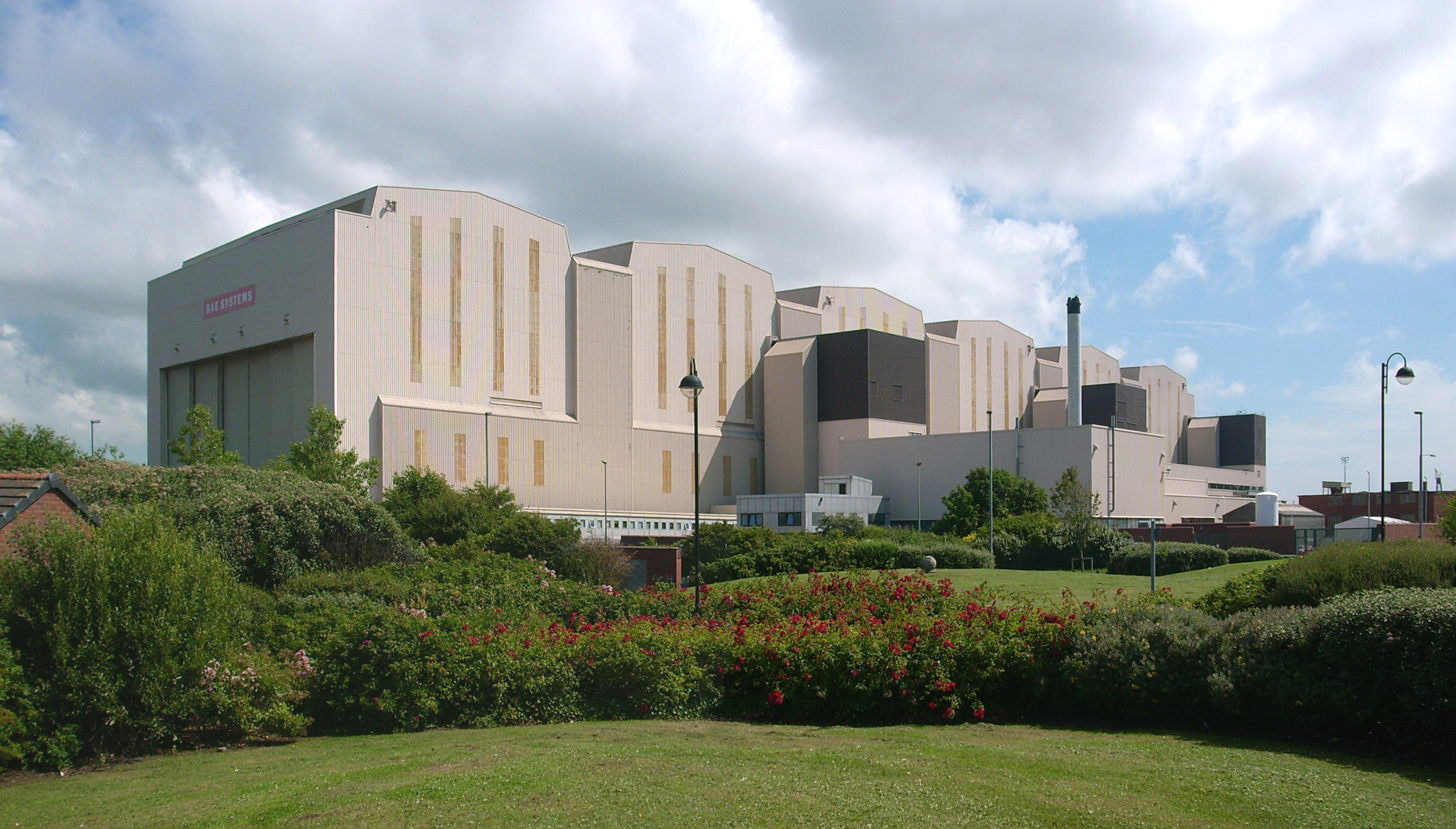
BAE Systems Submarine Solutions in Barrow-in-Furness has a workforce of around 14,500 people

Many large companies and organisations are based in Cumbria. The county council itself employs around 17,000 individuals, while the largest private employer in Cumbria, BAE Systems in Barrow employs around 14,500 with further job growth associated with new contracts expected, the Sellafield nuclear processing site, has a workforce of 10,000.

=== Tourism ===
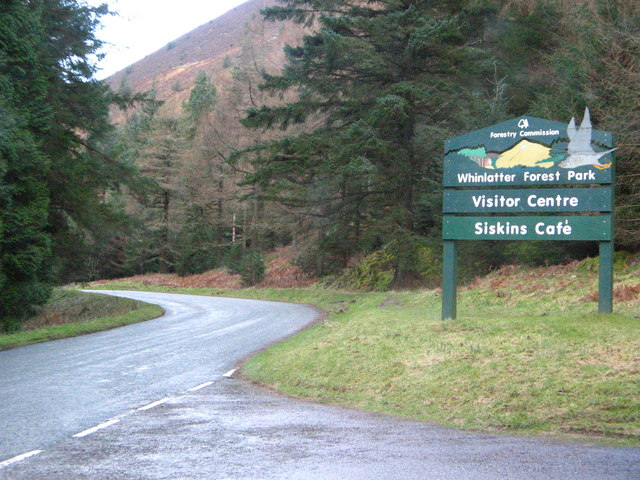
The entrance to Whinlatter Forest Park

Sizergh Castle

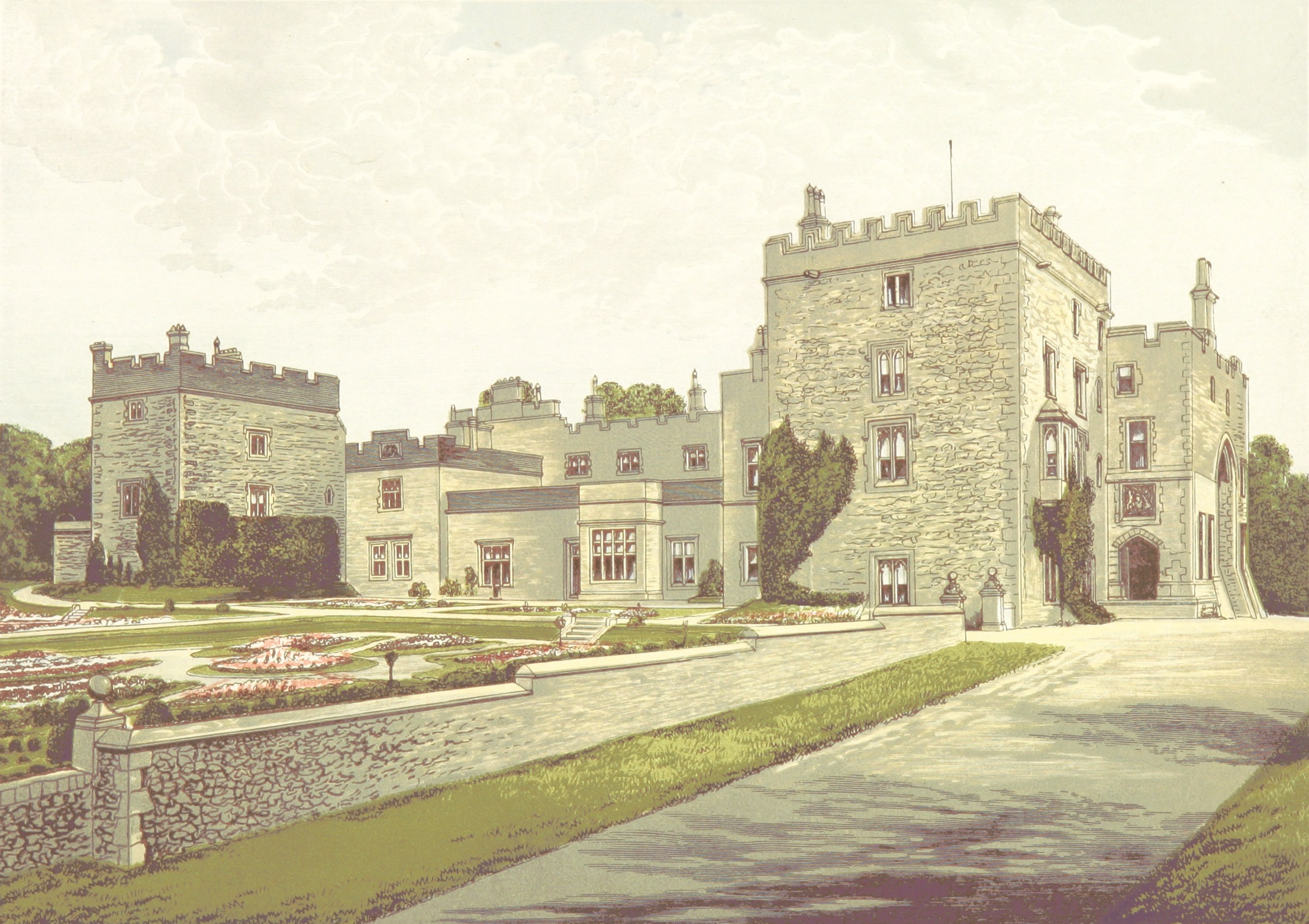
Muncaster Castle

The largest and most widespread industry is tourism. In 2025, the county attracted nearly 41 million visitors, of which 7.25 million spent at least one night there. The Lake District National Park alone receives some 15.8 million visitors every year. Despite this, fewer than 50,000 people reside permanently within the Lake District: mostly in Ambleside, Bowness-on-Windermere, Coniston, Gosforth, Grasmere, Keswick, and Windermere. As of 2025 over 41,000 people (full-time equivalents) are employed in the tourism industry, which adds £1.1 billion a year to the county's economy. The Lake District and the county as a whole attract visitors from across the UK, Europe, North America and the Far East, particularly Japan.

The tables below show the twenty most-visited attractions in Cumbria in 2009. Not all visitor attractions provided data to Cumbria Tourism who collated the list. Those who did not included Furness Abbey, the Lakes Aquarium and South Lakes Safari Zoo, the last of which would almost certainly rank within the top five.

Rank	Attraction	Location	Visitors
1	Windermere Lake Cruises	Bowness-on-Windermere	1,313,807
2	Rheged	Penrith	439,568
3	Ullswater Steamers	Glenridding	348,000
4	Whinlatter Forest Park and Visitor Centre	Whinlatter	252,762
5	Tullie House Museum and Art Gallery	Carlisle	251,808
6	Grizedale Forest Park and Visitor Centre	Grizedale	175,033
7	Carlisle Cathedral	Carlisle	166,141
8	Brockhole Lake District Visitor Centre	Windermere	135,539
9	Hill Top	Hawkshead	103,682
10	Sizergh Castle	Sizergh Castle	90,063

Rank	Attraction	Location	Visitors
11	Cumberland Pencil Museum	Keswick	80,100
12	Muncaster Castle	Ravenglass	78,474
13	Dock Museum	Barrow-in-Furness	73,239
14	The Beacon	Whitehaven	71,602
15	Holker Hall	Cartmel	58,060
16	Carlisle Castle	Carlisle	56,957
17	Beatrix Potter Gallery	Hawkshead	47,244
18	Lake District Wildlife Park	Bassenthwaite	45,559
19	The Homes of Football	Ambleside	49,661
20	Cartmel Priory	Cartmel	43,672

=== Economic output ===
GVA and GDP by local authority district in 2022
District	GVA (£ billions)	GVA per capita (£)	GDP (£ billions)	GDP per capita (£)
Cumberland	6.5	23,737	7.5	27,305
Westmorland and Furness	6.7	29,546	7.6	33,242
Cumbria	13.3	26,366	15.1	29,992

== Governance ==
=== Local ===
Cumbria comprises two unitary authority areas: Cumberland, which covers the north and west of the county, and Westmorland and Furness, which covers the south and east. They are named after the historic counties of Cumberland and Westmorland, although they have different boundaries, and the Furness region, which was historically part of Lancashire. The Cumbria Combined Authority is the strategic authority for the area.

The two areas are governed by Cumberland Council and Westmorland and Furness Council, respectively. They are unitary authorities, with the powers and responsibilities of both a non-metropolitan county council and non-metropolitan district council. Cumberland has had a Labour majority administration since the 2022 Cumberland Council election, and Westmorland and Furness has had a Liberal Democrat majority administration since the 2022 Westmorland and Furness Council election.

The Duchy of Lancaster, the private estate of the sovereign, exercises some rights of the Crown in the County Palatine of Lancaster, which includes the Furness area of Cumbria.

==== History ====
The historic counties within what is now Cumbria Boundary of Cumbria Historic Cumberland Historic Westmorland Historic Lancashire West Riding of Yorkshire

The Local Government Act 1888 reformed English local government. Cumberland, Westmorland, Lancashire, and the West Riding of Yorkshire were reconstituted as administrative counties, with elected county councils. Barrow-in-Furness was considered to be within Lancashire, but was made a county borough in the same act and therefore had independent local government. Carlisle was made a county borough within Cumberland in 1914.

The Local Government Act 1972 reformed English local government again, and in 1974 the non-metropolitan county of Cumbria was created from all of Cumberland and Westmorland, the Furness area of Lancashire, and the Sedbergh district of the West Riding. The new county was divided into six non-metropolitan districts: Allerdale, Barrow-in-Furness, Carlisle, Copeland, Eden, and South Lakeland. The provision of local government services was divided between Cumbria County Council and the district councils of the six non-metropolitan districts.

In 2023, the non-metropolitan county of Cumbria, its six districts, and their respective councils were abolished. They were replaced by two unitary authority areas: Cumberland, which replaced the districts of Allerdale, Copeland, and Carlisle; and Westmorland and Furness, which replaced Barrow-in-Furness, Eden, and South Lakeland.

=== Regional ===
Cumberland Council and Westmorland and Furness Council collaborate through the Cumbria Combined Authority, which was established in February 2026. It will elect its first mayor on 10 May 2027.

=== National ===
Cumbria contains five constituencies of the Parliament of the United Kingdom, and part of a sixth. Barrow and Furness, Carlisle, Penrith and Solway, Westmorland and Lonsdale, and Whitehaven and Workington are entirely within the county, and Morecambe and Lunesdale is shared with Lancashire. As of the 2024 United Kingdom general election, Westmorland and Londsale is held by the Liberal Democrats and the remainder of the constituencies by the Labour Party.

Constituency history since 1983
Constituency	1983	1987	1992	1997	2001	2005	2010	2015	2017	2019	2024
Barrow and Furness	CON Cecil Franks		LAB John Hutton				LAB John Woodcock			CON Simon Fell	LAB Michelle Scrogham
Carlisle	LAB Ronald Lewis	LAB Eric Martlew					CON John Stevenson				LAB Julie Minns
Copeland	LAB Jack Cunningham					LAB Jamie Reed			CON Trudy Harrison		Constituency abolished. See: Penrith and Solway and Whitehaven and Workington.
Morecambe and Lunesdale	Lancashire constituency										LAB Lizzi Collinge
Penrith and the Border	CON David Maclean						CON Rory Stewart			CON Neil Hudson	Constituency abolished. See: Penrith and Solway and Whitehaven and Workington.
Penrith and Solway	–										LAB Markus Campbell-Savours
Westmorland and Lonsdale	CON Michael Jopling			CON Tim Collins		LD Tim Farron					
Whitehaven and Workington	–										LAB Josh MacAlister
Workington	LAB Dale Campbell-Savours				LAB Tony Cunningham			LAB Sue Hayman		CON Mark Jenkinson	Constituency abolished. See: Penrith and Solway and Whitehaven and Workington.

2019 General Election results in Cumbria
Party	Votes	%	Change from 2017	Seats	Change from 2017
Conservative	143,615	52.4%	▲3.6%	5	▲2
Labour	79,402	28.9%	▼7.3%	0	▼2
Liberal Democrats	39,426	14.4%	▲2.6%	1	0
Greens	4,223	1.5%	▲0.8%	0	0
Brexit	3,867	1.4%	new	0	0
Others	3,044	1.1%	▲0.7%	0	0
Total	274,313	100%		6	

=== Politics ===
Conservatives and the Liberal Democrats are strongest in rural areas, and Labour is strongest in the industrial towns.

== Education ==
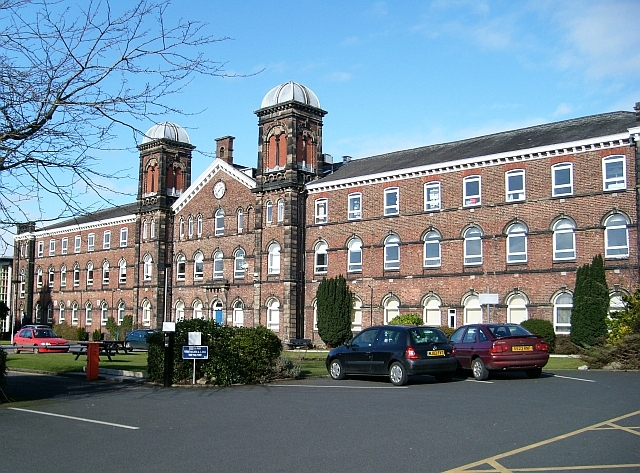
The University of Cumbria's Fusehill Campus in Carlisle

Secondary schooling in Cumbria has a comprehensive system almost fully. There is one state grammar school in Penrith. There are 42 state secondary schools and 10 independent schools. The more rural secondary schools tend to have sixth forms. This is the same for three schools in Allerdale and South Lakeland, and one in the other districts.

In Barrow-in-Furness district, no schools have sixth forms, due to the only sixth form college in Cumbria being located in the town. Chetwynde is the only school in Barrow to educate children from nursery all the way to year 11.

Colleges of further education in Cumbria include:

- Carlisle College
- Furness College which includes Barrow Sixth Form College
- Kendal College
- Lakes College

The University of Cumbria is one of the UK's newest universities, established in 2007. It is the only university based in Cumbria and has campuses across the county, together with Lancaster and London.

== Transport ==
=== Road ===
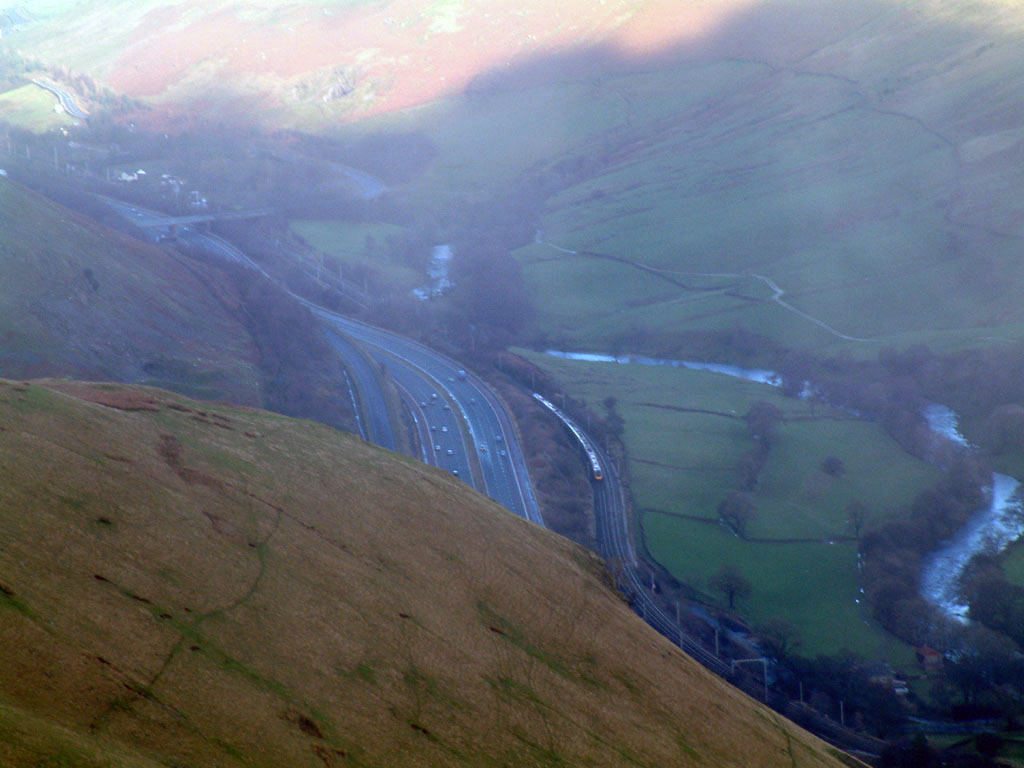
The M6 motorway and West Coast Main Line near Grayrigg Forest

The M6 is the only motorway that runs through Cumbria. Kendal and Penrith are amongst its primary destinations. Further north it becomes the A74(M) at the border with Scotland north of Carlisle. Major A roads within Cumbria include:

- A6 (Luton, Bedfordshire to Carlisle via Kendal and Penrith)
- A66 (Workington to Middlesbrough, North Yorkshire via Keswick and M6 Junction 40)
- A69 (Carlisle to Newcastle upon Tyne via Brampton and Hexham)
- A590 (M6 Junction 36 to Barrow-in-Furness via Ulverston)
- A591 (Sizergh to Bothel via Kendal, Windermere, Ambleside, Grasmere and Keswick)
- A592 (Penrith to Newby Bridge via M6 Junction 40, Windermere and Bowness)
- A595 (Carlisle to Dalton-in-Furness via Whitehaven and Workington)
- A596 (Carlisle to Workington)

Several bus companies run services in Cumbria serving the main towns and villages in the county, with some services running to neighbouring areas such as Lancaster. Stagecoach Cumbria & North Lancashire is the largest; it has depots in Barrow-in-Furness, Carlisle, Kendal and Workington. Stagecoach's flagship X6 route connects Barrow-in-Furness and Kendal in south Cumbria.

=== Air ===
There are two airports in the county: Carlisle Lake District and Barrow/Walney Island. Both airports formerly served scheduled passenger flights and both are proposing expansions and renovations to handle domestic and European flights in the near future. The nearest international airports to south Cumbria are Blackpool, Manchester, Liverpool John Lennon and Teesside. North Cumbria is closer to Newcastle, Glasgow Prestwick and Glasgow International.

=== Ports ===
Barrow-in-Furness is one of the country's largest shipbuilding centres. The Port of Barrow is minor, operated by Associated British Ports alongside the Port of Silloth in Allerdale. There are no ferry links from any port or harbour along the Cumbria coast.

=== Rail ===
The busiest railway stations in Cumbria are Carlisle, Barrow-in-Furness, Penrith and Oxenholme Lake District. The 399 miles (642 km) West Coast Main Line runs through the Cumbria countryside, adjacent to the M6 motorway. The Cumbrian Coast Line connects Barrow-in-Furness to Carlisle and is a vital link in the west of the county. Other railways in Cumbria are the Windermere Branch Line, most of the Furness Line and much of the Settle-Carlisle Railway.

== Demography ==
The largest settlements in Cumbria

=== Population ===
Cumbria's largest settlement and only city is Carlisle, in the north of the county. The largest town, Barrow-in-Furness, in the south, is slightly smaller. The county's population is largely rural: it has the second-lowest population density among English counties, and only five towns with over 20,000 people. Cumbria is one of the country's most ethnically homogeneous counties, with 95% categorised as White British (around 471,000 of the 500,000). The larger towns have ethnic makeups closer to the national average. The 2001 census indicated Christianity was the religion with the most adherents in the county.

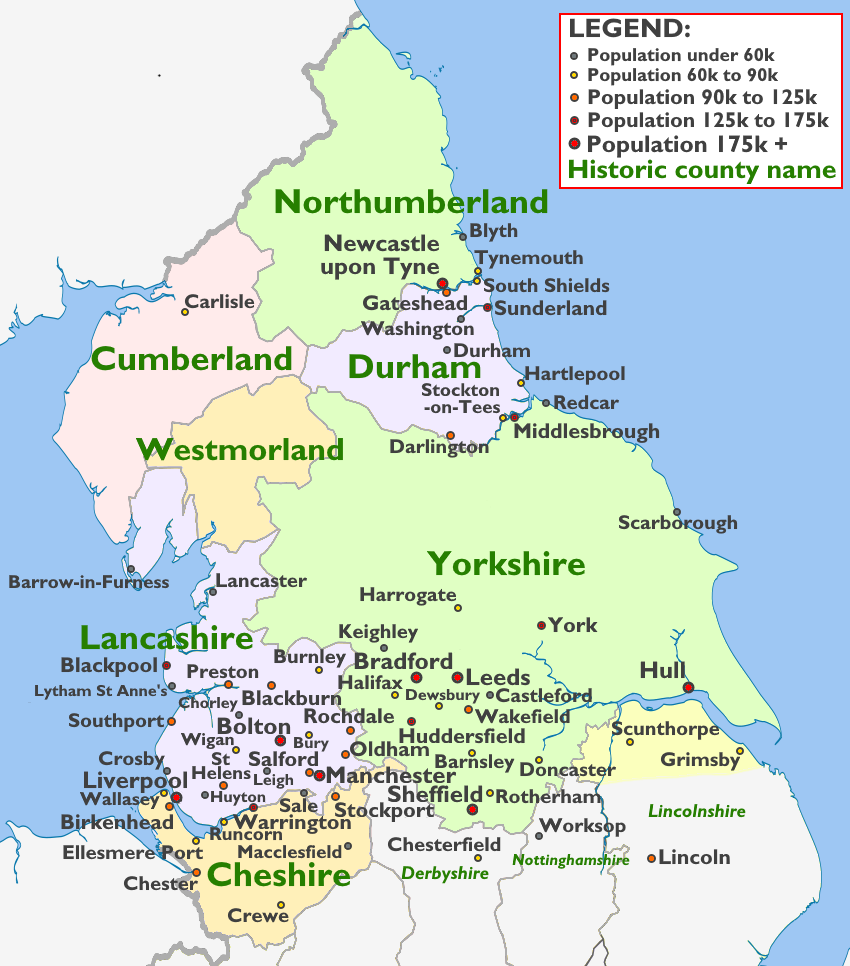
This map of cities and towns of Northern England shows the relative lack of urbanisation in Cumbria (shown here as the historic counties of Cumberland and Westmorland) compared to the rest of the region

2010 ONS estimates placed the number of foreign-born (non-United Kingdom) people living in Cumbria at around 14,000 and foreign nationals at 6,000. Population trends indicate a gradual decline in younger demographics, with an increasing proportion of elderly residents. The 2001 UK Census showed the following most common countries of birth for residents of Cumbria that year:

- England, 454,137
- Scotland, 16,628
- Wales, 3,471
- Northern Ireland, 2,289
- Germany, 1,438
- Republic of Ireland, 1,359
- South Africa, 603
- Canada, 581
- Australia, 531
- United States, 493
- India, 476
- Hong Kong, 417
- Italy, 249
- New Zealand, 241
- France, 197
- Poland, 193
- Cyprus, 174
- Netherlands, 167
- Spain, 166
- Singapore, 160

Population totals for Cumbria

Year	Pop.	±% p.a.
1801	173,017	—
1811	193,139	+1.11%
1821	225,555	+1.56%
1831	242,320	+0.72%
1841	255,603	+0.54%
1851	274,957	+0.73%

Year	Pop.	±% p.a.
1861	320,257	+1.54%
1871	365,556	+1.33%
1881	410,856	+1.18%
1891	434,867	+0.57%
1901	437,364	+0.06%
1911	440,485	+0.07%

Year	Pop.	±% p.a.
1921	441,483	+0.02%
1931	442,693	+0.03%
1941	456,833	+0.31%
1951	471,897	+0.32%
1961	473,706	+0.04%
1971	475,669	+0.04%

Year	Pop.	±% p.a.
1981	471,693	−0.08%
1991	489,191	+0.36%
2001	487,607	−0.03%
2011	499,900	+0.25%
2014	499,800	−0.01%

Pre-1974 statistics were gathered from local government areas that are now comprised by Cumbria
Source: Great Britain Historical GIS.

Population of Cumbria by district (2025)
District	Land area		Population		Density (/km^{2})
District	(km^{2})	(%)	People	(%)	Density (/km^{2})
Cumberland	3,012	45%	282,343	55%	94
Westmorland and Furness	3,756	55%	231,307	45%	62
Cumbria	6,768	100%	513,650	100%	76

== Settlements ==
- Alston
- Ambleside
- Appleby-in-Westmorland
- Arlecdon and Frizington
- Askam and Ireleth
- Aspatria
- Barrow-in-Furness
- Bowness-on-Windermere
- Brampton
- Carlisle
- Cleator Moor
- Cockermouth
- Coniston
- Dalston
- Dalton-in-Furness
- Egremont
- Grasmere
- Harrington
- Hawkshead
- Keswick
- Kirkby Lonsdale
- Kirkby Stephen
- Kirkoswald
- Longtown
- Maryport
- Millom
- Milnthorpe
- Sedbergh
- Shap
- Silloth
- St Bees
- Ulverston
- Walney Island
- Whitehaven
- Wigton
- Windermere
- Workington

== Sport ==
=== Running ===
Fell running is a popular sport in Cumbria, with an active calendar of competitions taking place throughout the year. Cumbria is also home to several of the most active orienteering clubs in the UK as well as the Lakes 5 Days competition that takes place every four years.

=== Football codes ===
Workington is home to the ball game known as Uppies and Downies, a traditional version of football, with its origins in medieval football or an even earlier form. Players from outside Workington also take part, especially fellow West Cumbrians from Whitehaven and Maryport.

Cumbria formerly had minor American football clubs, the Furness Phantoms (the club is now defunct, its last name was Morecambe Bay Storm) and the Carlisle Kestrels.

==== Association ====
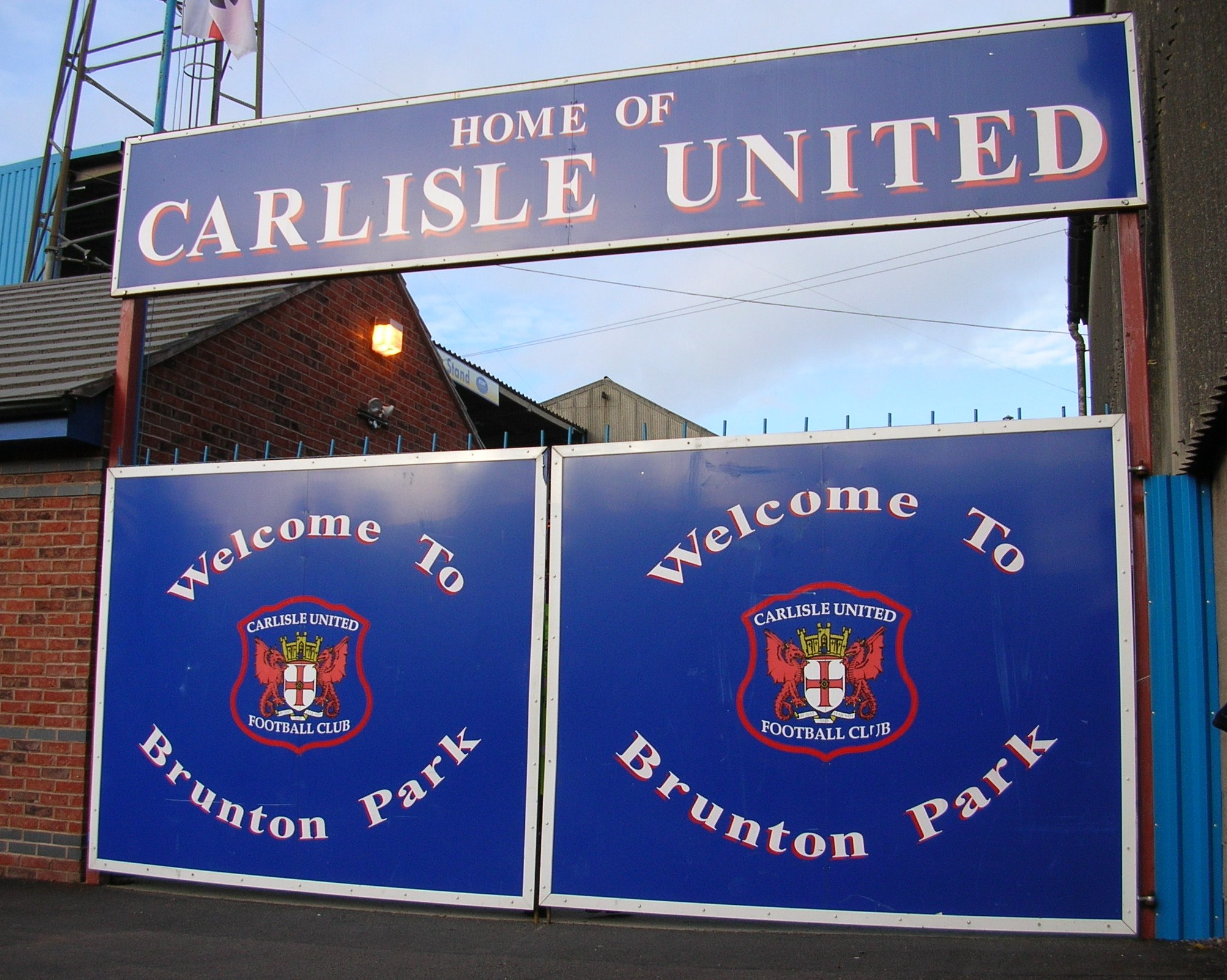
Brunton Park, the home of Carlisle United

Barrow and Carlisle United are the only professional football teams in Cumbria. Carlisle United attract support from across Cumbria and beyond, with many Cumbrian "ex-pats" travelling to see their games, both home and away.

Workington—who are always known locally as "the reds"—are a well-supported non-league team, having been relegated from the Football League in the 1970s. Workington made a rapid rise up the non league ladder and in 2007/08 competed with Barrow in the Conference North. Barrow were then promoted to the Conference Premier in 2007/08. In 2020, Barrow were promoted to the Football League as a result of winning the National League.

==== Rugby codes ====
Rugby union is popular in the county's north and east with teams such as Furness RUFC & Hawcoat Park RUFC (South Cumbria), Workington RUFC (Workington Zebras), Whitehaven RUFC, Carlisle RUFC, Creighton RUFC, Aspatria RUFC, Wigton RUFC, Kendal RUFC, Kirkby Lonsdale RUFC, Keswick RUFC, Cockermouth RUFC, Upper Eden RUFC and Penrith RUFC.

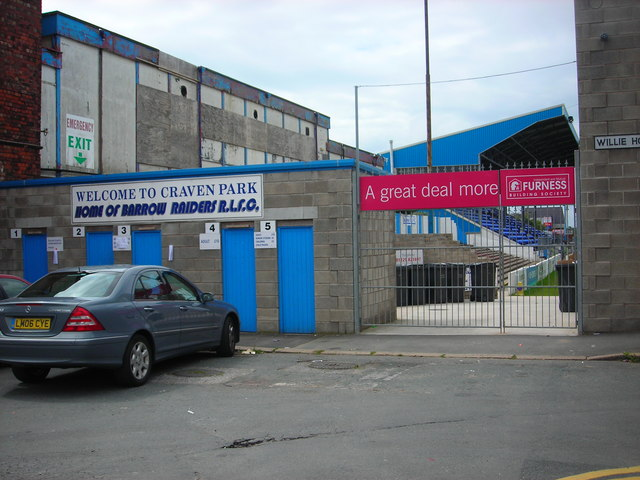
Craven Park, home of Barrow Raiders

Rugby league is a very popular sport in south and West Cumbria. Barrow, Whitehaven and Workington play in the Rugby League Championships. Amateur teams; Wath Brow Hornets, Askam, Egremont Rangers, Kells, Barrow Island, Hensingham and Millom play in the National Conference.

=== Bat-and-ball ===
Cumbria County Cricket Club is one of the cricket clubs that constitute the National Counties in the English domestic cricket structure. The club, based in Carlisle, competes in the National Counties Cricket Championship and the NCCA Knockout Trophy. The club also play some home matches in Workington, as well as other locations. Cumbrian club cricket teams play in the North Lancashire and Cumbria League.

Cumbria is home to the Cartmel Valley Lions, an amateur baseball team based in Cartmel.

=== Wrestling ===
Cumberland and Westmorland wrestling is an ancient and well-practised tradition in the county with a strong resemblance to Scottish Backhold.

In the 21st century Cumberland and Westmorland wrestling along with other aspects of Lakeland culture are practised at the Grasmere Sports and Show, an annual meeting held every year since 1852 on the August Bank Holiday.

The origin of this form of wrestling is a matter of debate, with some describing it as having evolved from Norse wrestling brought over by Viking invaders, while other historians associate it with the Cornish and Gouren styles indicating that it may have developed out of a longer-standing Celtic tradition.

=== Racing ===
Cumbria Kart Racing Club is based at the Lakeland Circuit, Rowrah, between Cockermouth and Egremont Lakeland Circuit. The track is a venue for rounds of both major UK national karting championships About Cumbria Kart Racing Club. Formula One world champions Lewis Hamilton and Jenson Button both raced karts at Rowrah many times in the formative stages of their motor sport careers. Other F1 drivers, past and present, to have competed there include Johnny Herbert, Anthony Davidson, Allan McNish, Ralph Firman, and Paul di Resta. David Coulthard hailed from just over the nearby Anglo-Scottish border and regarded Rowrah as his home circuit, becoming Cumbria Kart Racing Club Champion in 1985 in succession to McNish, di Resta taking the CKRC title subsequently.

Workington Comets were a Workington-based professional speedway team, which competed in the British Speedway Championship.

The World Rally Championship team Ford World Rally Team were based in Cumbria until their withdrawal after the 2012 season. A successful team, they won the Championship for manufacturers three times. The M-Sport Ford World Rally Team succeeded this team and have since won the Championship for manufacturers in 2017.

== Food ==
Cumbria is the UK county with the highest number of Michelin-starred restaurants, with seven in this classification in the Great Britain and Ireland Michelin Guide of 2021. Traditional Cumbrian cuisine has been influenced by the spices and molasses that were imported into Whitehaven in the 18th century. The Cumberland sausage, which has a protected geographical status, is a well-recognised result of this. Other regional specialities include Herdwick mutton and the salt-marsh raised lamb of the Cartmel Peninsula.

== Dialect influences ==
=== Celtic ===
- Cumbria was mostly Celtic speaking until the Viking invasion, if not later (Cymry)
- English spoken in parts of Cumbria; relatively sparsely populated until 12th/13th centuries
- The invading Angles and Saxons forced the indigenous Celtic peoples back to the western highlands of Cumbria, Wales and Cornwall, with little linguistic consequence, apart from a residual scattering of place-names.
- Northwest – possibility of direct influence from Irish Gaelic across Irish Sea via Whitehaven until 10th century
- Celtic influence/kingdoms may have confirmed perception of difference between the north–south
- Linguistic interaction between Celts and English underrated: effectively Celtic influence marked the beginnings of a linguistic divide between English and other West Germanic dialects.
- Lexis – Celtic influence left specifically on the sound pattern of sheep-scoring numerals of Cumbrian and West Yorkshire
- Loss of inflections may be explained by contact with Celtic tribes and inter-marriage.

=== Anglo-Saxon/Viking ===
- Earliest Anglo-Saxon settlements in the east of England. Took over 200 years to establish a frontier in the west where the displaced British had settled
- Morphology – Old Northumbrian (little evidence) signs of loss of inflexions long before southern dialects below the Humber, precede Viking settlements and dialect contact situation

=== Scandinavian/Norse/Dane ===
- Lack of extent of Old English written evidence
- Main attacks/raids on the North-East coast at Lindisfarne and Jarrow in 793/ 794
- Settlement patterns (Danes) contributed to emerging differences over time between Northumberland. Durham and Yorkshire dialects
- Norwegian settlers via Ireland to Isle of Man, Mersey estuary (901) and the Cumbrian/ Lancashire coasts (900–50) – dialectal differences (Danes/ Norwegians) often lumped together in standard histories – MUST have confirmed emerging dialectal differences east and west of the Pennines
- Danelaw – land of north and east of land ruled under Danish law and Danish customs (978–1016)
- Scandinavian influences vocabulary – common words gradually diffused/ entered word stock (borrowings) which survive in regional use – fell ('hillside'), lug ('ear'), loup ('jump'), aye ('yes')
- Influence on grammatical structure – Middle English texts reveal that present participle form -and, and possible that use of at and as as relative pronouns from Cumbria to East Yorkshire
- Phonetically /g/, /k/ and cluster /sk/ have a northern/ Norse pronunciation /j/, /ʧ/ and /ʃ/ which are West Saxon – hard vs. soft consonants of north–south dialects – e.g. give/ rigg ('ridge'), skrike ('shriek'), kist ('chest') and ik ('I')
- 'Interdialect forms' in Danelaw area (diffuse > focussed situation) – no clear idea about what language they were speaking – mixture of Old English and Norse e.g. she (3rd person pronoun) is claimed by both languages
- Bilingualism was norm in areas under Danelaw (plausible)
- Norse runic inscriptions survive from 11th century in Cumbria – therefore may only been after Norman Conquest that 'Norse as a living language died out'
- Norse surviving longest in closed communities

=== Normans ===
- Jewell (1994: 20) – Northumbria retained relative independence until 13th century – effective government of North by Normans 'petered-out' at Lake District and North of Tees (not recorded in Domesday Book)
- Carlisle retaken by Scots in 1136

=== Cumbric ===
- Early 10th century – The grip from Northumbrian on the former territory of Rheged was that of Britons of Strathcylde reoccupied southwest Scotland and northwest England as far south as Derwent and Penrith. which was held until Carlisle retaken by Scots in 1136
- Cumbric perhaps survived until it faded in the early 12th century throughout Cumbria.
- Cumbric score – counting sheep – Welsh correspondence Welsh ("un, dau, tri") – Cumberland ("yan, tyan, tethera") – Westmorland ("yan, than, teddera") – Lancashire ("yan, taen, tedderte") – West Yorkshire ("yain, tain, eddero") – survived 7–8 centuries after the language itself had died – Brittonic origin
- Not one single complete phrase in Cumbric survives, evidence to suggest strong literary tradition, probably oral, some of this early material is known in a Welsh version

== Media ==
Two evening newspapers are published daily in Cumbria. The News and Star focuses largely on Carlisle and the surrounding areas of north and west Cumbria, and the North-West Evening Mail is based in Barrow-in-Furness and covers news from across Furness and the South Lakes. The Cumberland and Westmorland Herald and The Westmorland Gazette are weekly newspapers based in Penrith and Kendal respectively.

The Egremont 2Day newspaper, formerly Egremont Today when affiliated with the Labour Party, was a prominent monthly publication – founded by Peter Watson (and edited by him until his death in 2014) in 1990 until July 2018. In February 2020 The Herdwick News, run by the last editor of The Egremont 2Day, was launched and is an independent online news publication covering the county of Cumbria and the North West.

Due to the size of Cumbria the county spans two television zones: BBC North East and Cumbria and ITV Border in the north and centre, and BBC North West and ITV Granada in the south. Heart North West, Greatest Hits Radio Cumbria & South West Scotland and Smooth Lake District are the most popular local radio stations throughout the county, with BBC Radio Cumbria being the only station that is aimed at Cumbria as a whole. BBC Radio Lancashire can also be received in southern parts of the county.

Cumbria is host to a number of festivals, including Kendal Calling (actually held in Penrith since 2009) and Kendal Mountain Festival.

== Places of interest ==
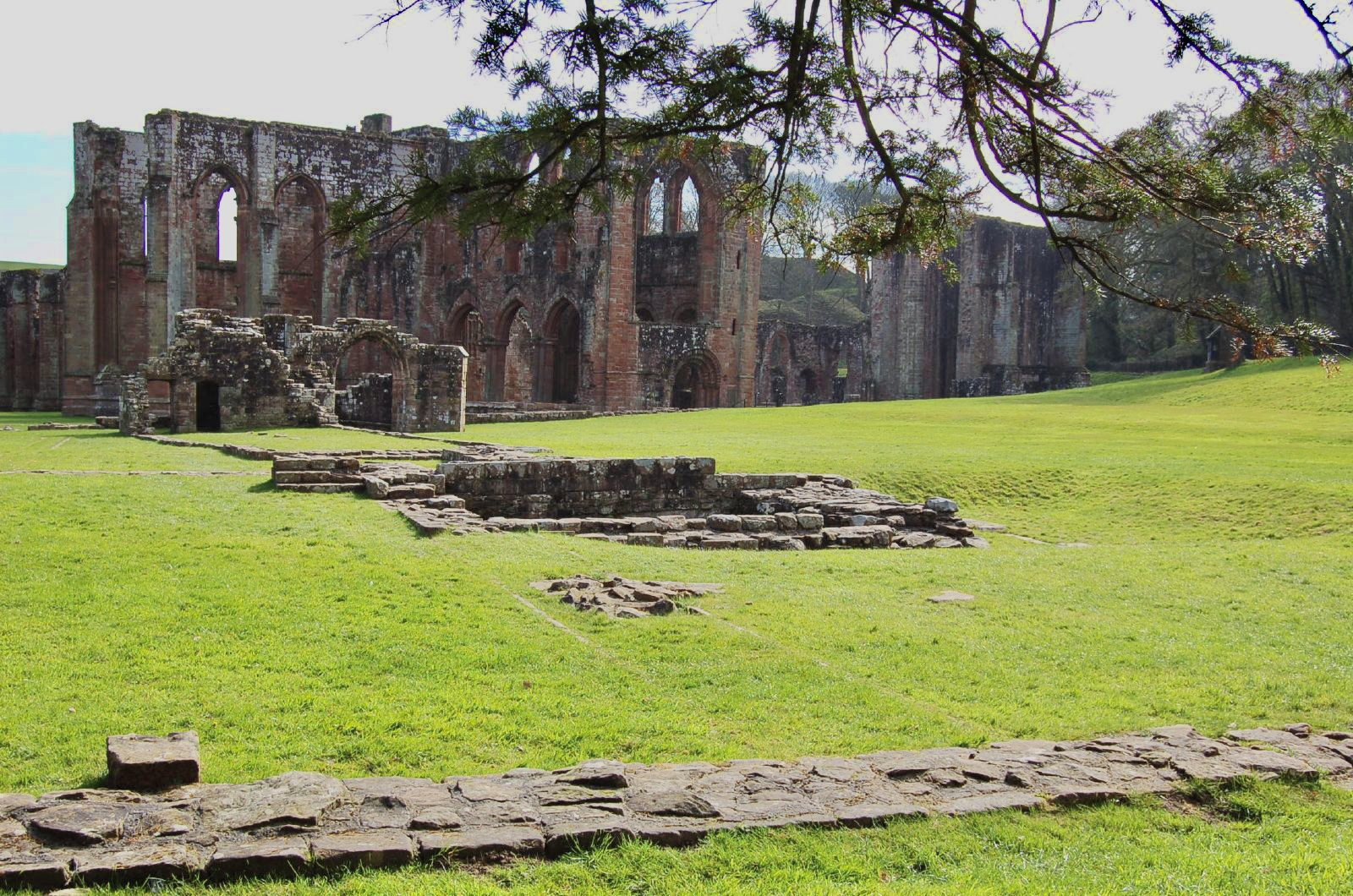
Furness Abbey

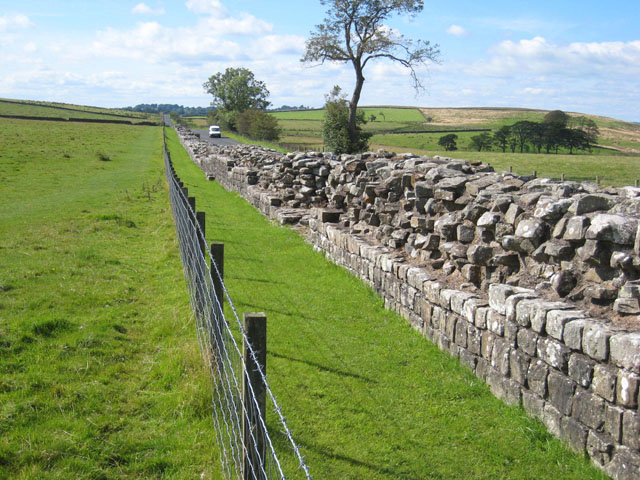
Hadrian's Wall

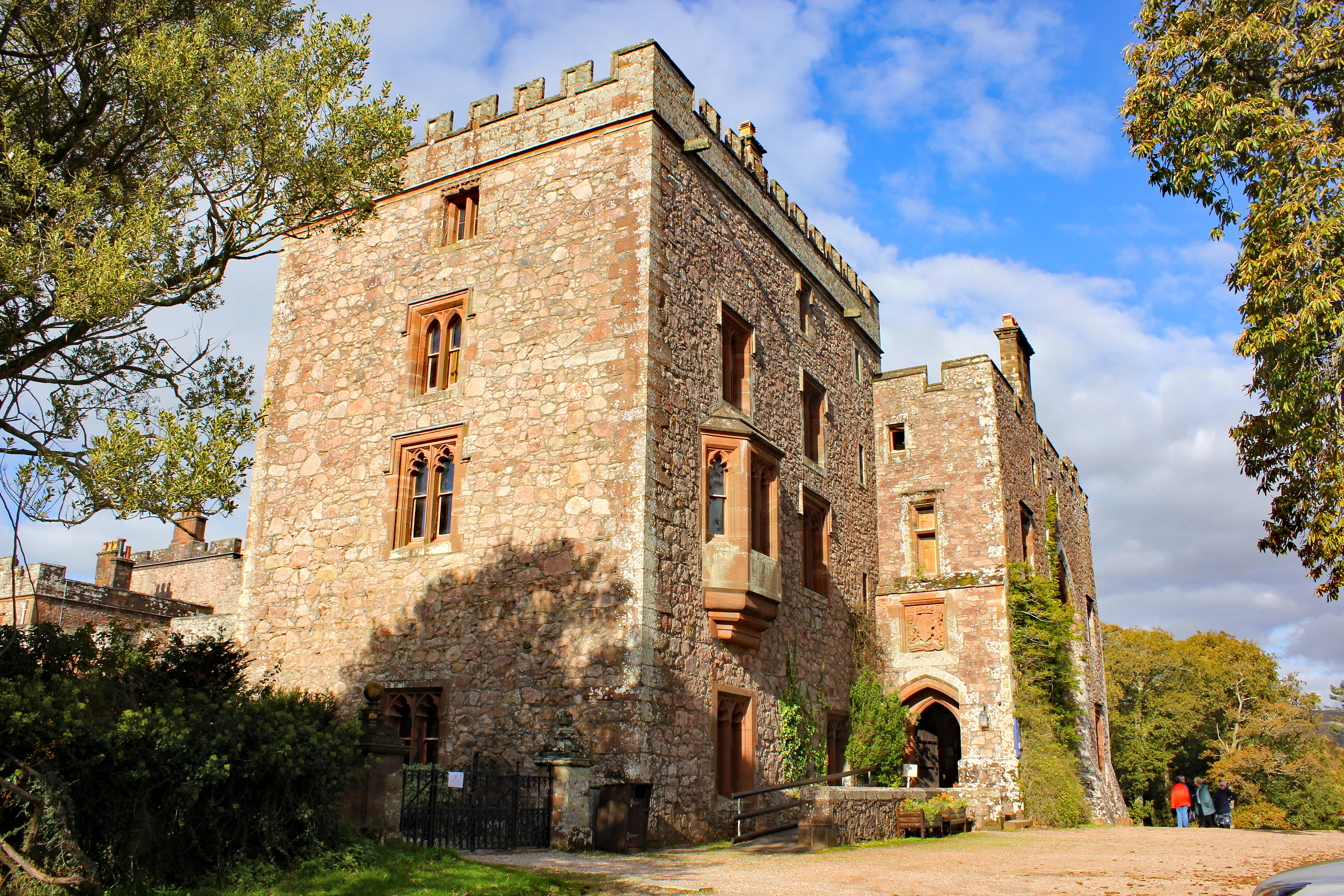
Muncaster Castle

Key
	Abbey/Priory/Cathedral
Accessible open space	Accessible open space
	Amusement/Theme Park
	Castle
Country Park	Country Park
	English Heritage
	Forestry Commission
Heritage railway	Heritage railway
Historic house	Historic House
Places of Worship	Places of Worship
Museum (free) Museum	Museum (free/not free)
National Trust	National Trust
	Theatre
	Zoo

- Appleby Horse Fair (Romani fair)
- Armitt Museum and Library, Ambleside
- Bassenthwaite Lake
- Black Combe fell
- Blackwell house
- Brantwood house and museum
- Cartmel Priory
- Carlisle Cathedral
- Carlisle Citadel
- Castles
  - Appleby
  - Brough
  - Brougham
  - Carlisle
  - Dalton
  - Egremont
  - Hartley
  - Kendal
  - Muncaster
  - Penrith
  - Fouldry on Piel Island
  - Sizergh with garden
- Castlerigg Stone Circle
- Church of St Olaf, Wasdale
- Wainwright's Coast to Coast Walk
- Dock Museum
- Dove Cottage
- Eden Valley Railway
- Fell Foot Park
- Firbank Fell
- Furness Abbey
- Haig Colliery Mining Museum
- Harrison Stickle
- Hadrian's Wall
- Halls
  - Abbot, art gallery and museum
  - Brough
  - Holker
  - Levens
  - Swarthmoor
- Hawkshead Grammar School Museum
- Hill Top house museum
- Hoad Monument
- Hodbarrow Nature Reserve
- Killington Reservoir
- Lakeside & Haverthwaite Railway
- Langwathby railway station
- Lakeland Wildlife Oasis
- Lanercost Priory
- Long-distance footpaths
  - Cumbria Coastal Way
  - Cumbria Way
  - Dales Way
  - Pennine Way
- Meres
  - Buttermere
  - Kentmere
  - Thirlmere
  - Windermere
- Millom Heritage and Arts Centre
- Museum of Lakeland Life & Industry
- National Nature Reserves in Cumbria
- Quaker tapestry
- Ravenglass & Eskdale Railway – heritage railway
- Rey Cross
- Sea to Sea Cycle Route
- Seathwaite Tarn
- Sellafield Nuclear Reprocessing Facility
- Skelton Transmitting Station (UK's tallest structure)
- South Lakes Safari Zoo
- St Bees Priory
- St Bees Head
- Stott Park Bobbin Mill
- Waters:
  - Coniston
  - Crummock
  - Derwent
  - Ennerdale
  - Haweswater
  - Rydal
  - Wast
  - Ullswater
- Whinfell Forest
- Windermere Steamboat Museum

=== Gallery ===
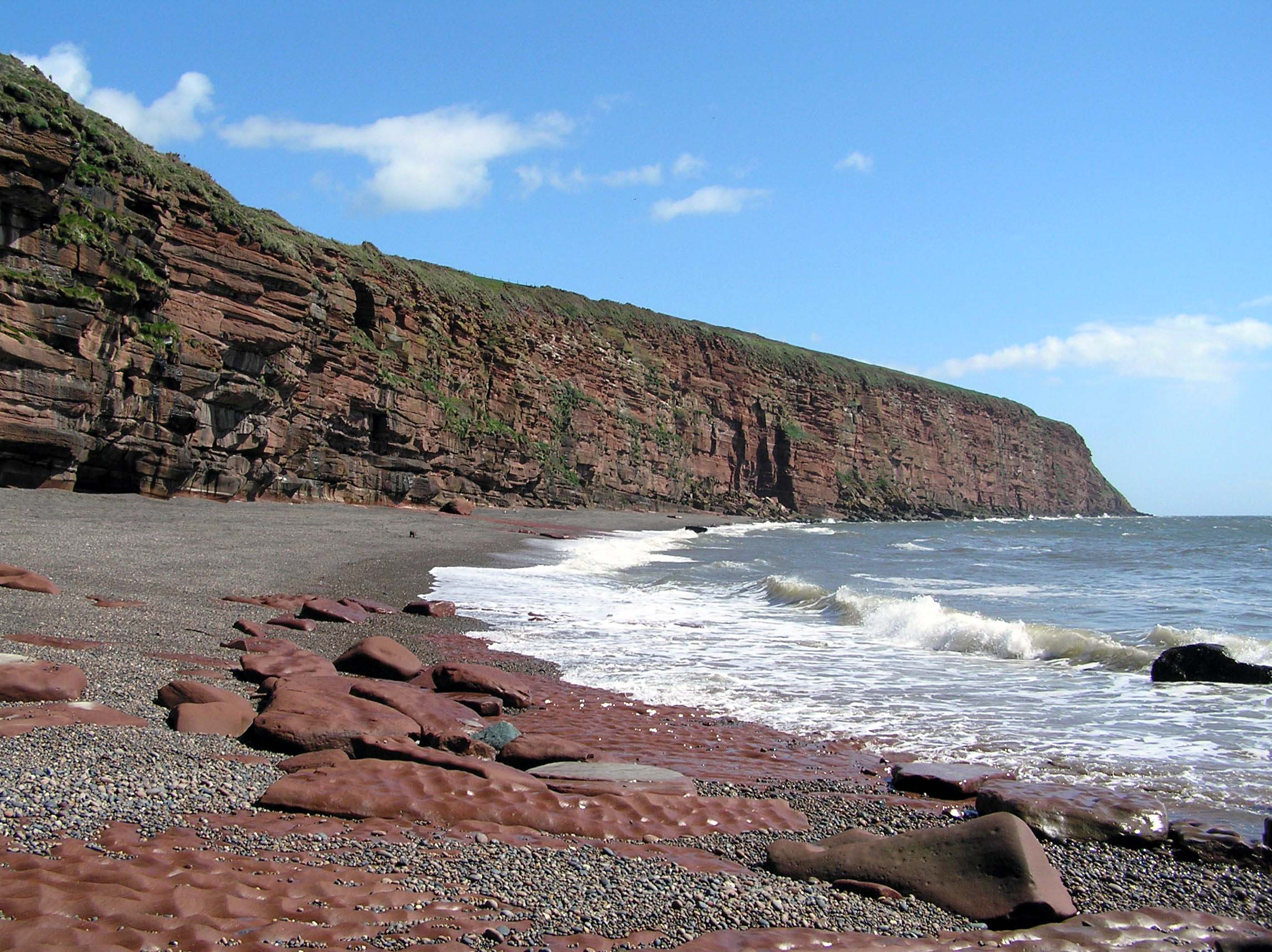
St Bees Head

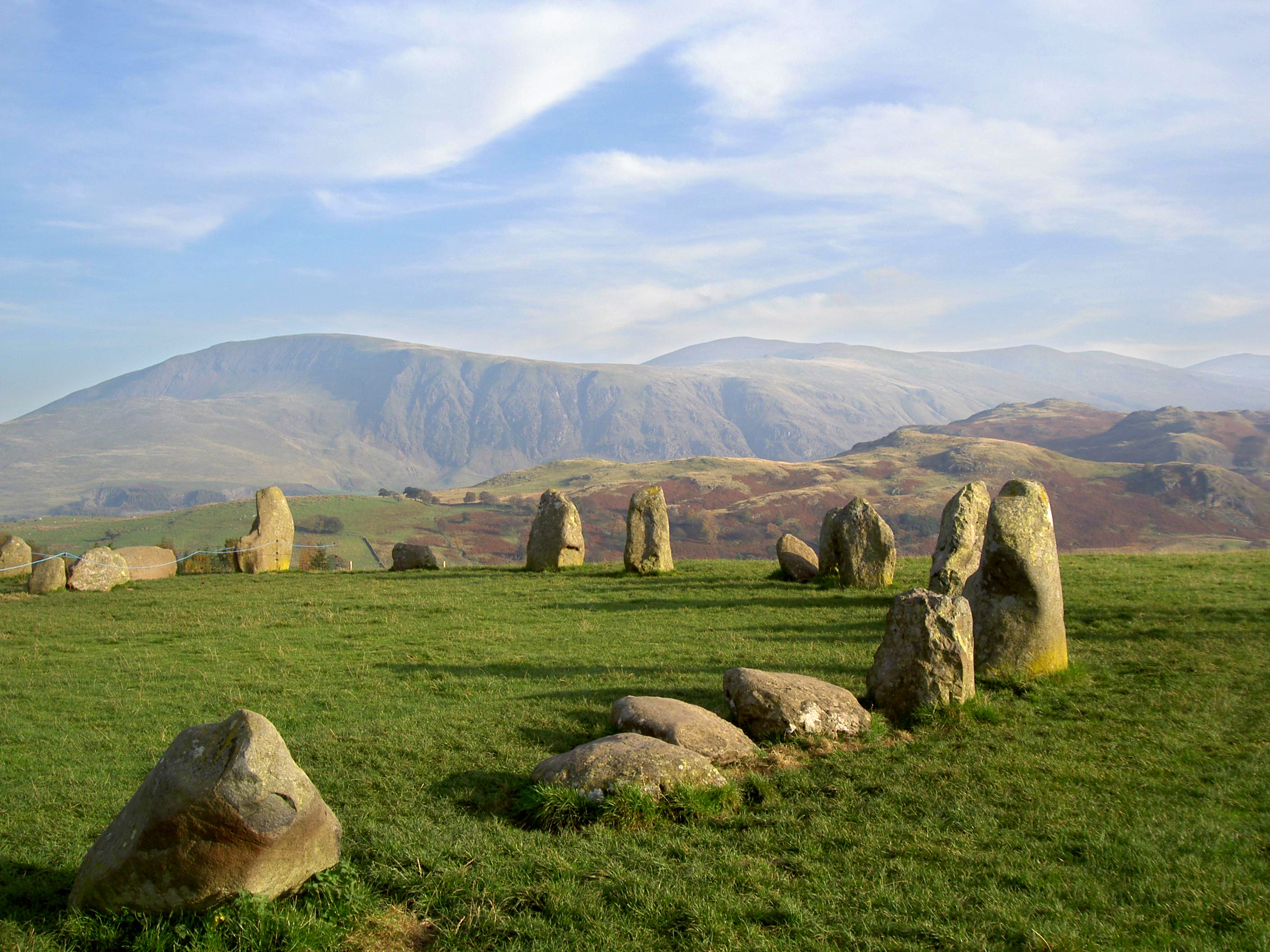
Castlerigg Stone Circle

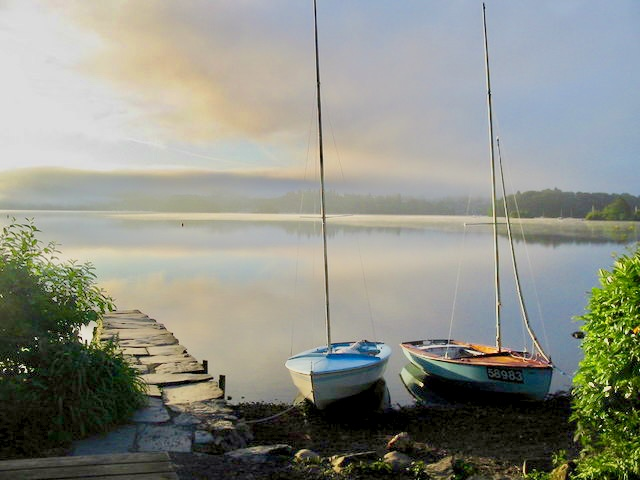
Windermere

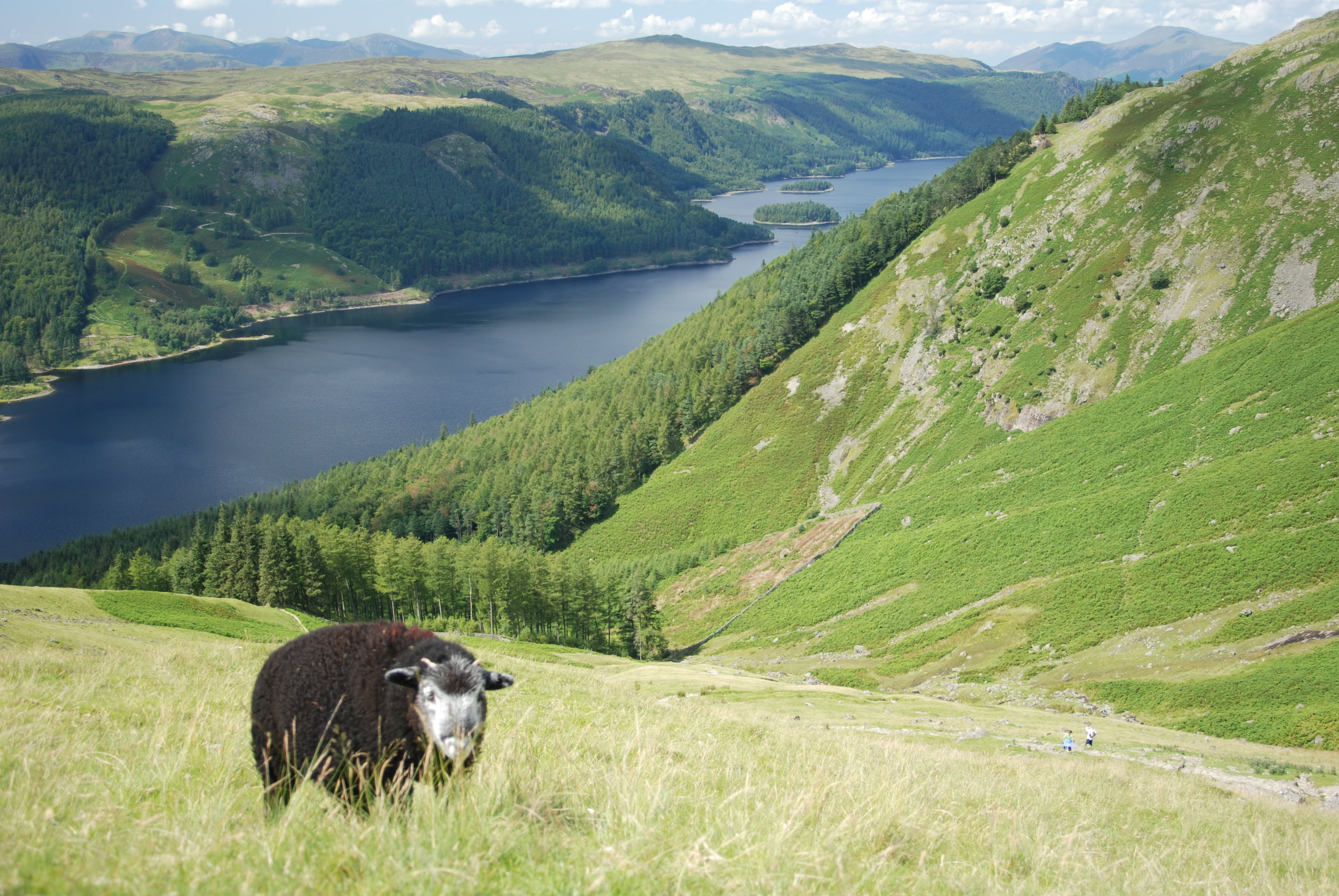
Thirlmere

== Notable people ==
- Abraham Acton
- Adam Roynon
- Ade Gardner
- Aim
- Alfred Wainwright
- Anna Dean
- Anna Ford
- Beatrix Potter
- Ben Stokes
- Bill Birkett
- Brad Kavanagh
- Brian Donnelly
- Brian Edgar
- British Sea Power
- Catherine Hall (novelist)
- Catherine Parr
- Chris Bonington
- Christine McVie
- Christopher Wordsworth
- Constance Spry
- Baron Campbell-Savours
- Dean Henderson
- Derrick Bird
- Dick Huddart
- Donald Campbell
- Dorothy Wordsworth
- Douglas Ferreira
- Eddie Stobart
- Edmund Grindal
- Edward Stobart
- Edward Troughton
- Emlyn Hughes
- Eric Robson
- Eric Wallace
- Fletcher Christian
- Francis Dunnery
- Francis Howgill
- Frank McPherson
- Baron Peart
- Gary McKee
- Gary Stevens
- Gavin Skelton
- George MacDonald Fraser
- George Romney
- Georgia Stanway
- Glenn Cornick
- Glenn Murray
- Harry Hadley
- Helen Skelton
- Hugh Lowther, 5th Earl of Lonsdale
- Ian McDonald
- Ike Southward
- Jack Pelter
- James Alexander Smith
- Jess Gillam
- Jimmy Lewthwaite
- Jack Adams
- John Burridge
- John Dalton
- John Peel
- John Ruskin
- John Wilkinson
- Jon Roper
- Josefina de Vasconcellos
- Joss Naylor
- Karen Taylor
- Kathleen Ferrier
- Keith Tyson
- Kyle Dempsey
- Lady Anne Clifford
- Len Wilkinson
- Lord Soulsby
- Malcolm Wilson
- Margaret Fell
- Mark Cueto
- Mark Jenkinson
- Matthew Wilson
- Maurice Flitcroft
- Melvyn Bragg
- Montagu Slater
- Neil Ferguson
- Nella Last
- Nigel Kneale
- Norman Birkett
- Norman Gifford
- Norman Nicholson
- Percy Kelly
- Peter Purves
- Phil Jackson
- Richard Abbot
- Richard T. Slone
- Robert Southey
- Saint Ninian
- Samuel Taylor Coleridge
- Sarah Hall
- Sheila Fell
- Sir James Ramsden
- Sir John Barrow
- Sol Roper
- Stan Laurel
- Dame Stella Rimington
- Stephen Holgate
- Steve Dixon
- Stuart Lancaster
- Stuart Stockdale
- Taylor Charters
- Dave Myers
- Thomas Cape
- Thomas DeQuincey
- Thomas Henry Ismay
- Thomas Round
- Troy Donockley
- Vic Metcalfe
- Wayne Curtis
- William Gilpin
- William Stobart
- William Whitelaw
- William Wordsworth
- Willie Horne
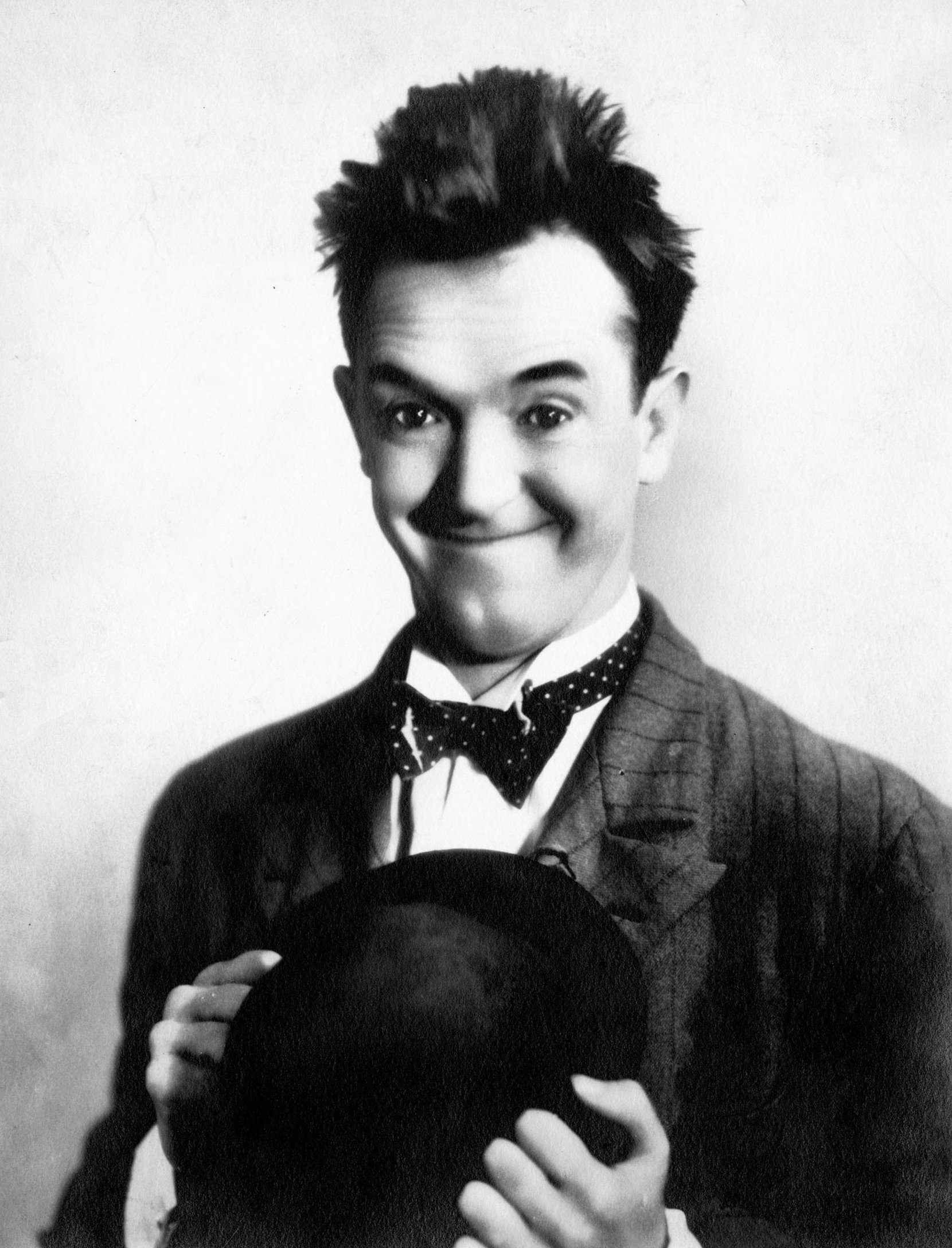
Stan Laurel

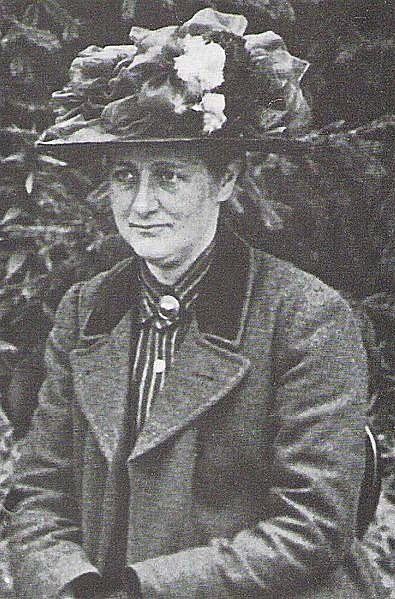
Beatrix Potter

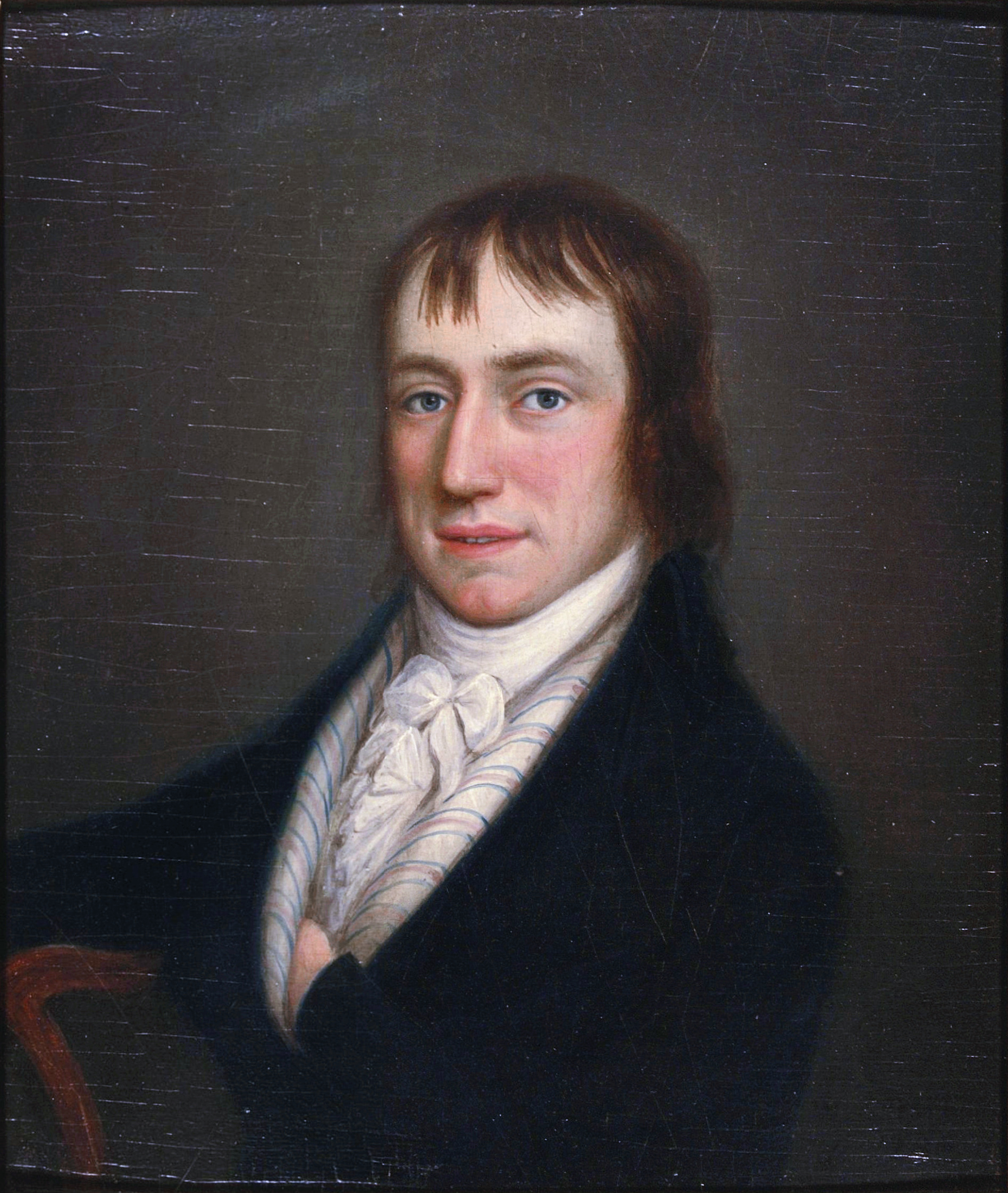
William Wordsworth

== Symbols ==
The community Flag of Cumbria, adopted in 2025

The county is represented by the Flag of Cumbria, also known as the Cumbria Community Flag. The design features green and gold chevrons symbolising the county's hills, fells and farmland, a blue field for its lakes, rivers and coastline, and a golden crown representing unity, heritage and civic pride.

== See also ==
- Anglo-Scottish border
- Cumbria Police, Fire and Crime Commissioner
- Healthcare in Cumbria
- List of Cumbria-related topics
- List of English and Welsh endowed schools (19th century)#Cumberland
- List of English and Welsh endowed schools (19th century)#Westmorland
- List of High Sheriffs of Cumbria
- List of Lord Lieutenants of Cumbria
- Outline of England
- Principality of the Cumbrians in 12th century Scotland
- Rose Castle
