= Barrow Island, Barrow-in-Furness =

Area and former electoral ward of Barrow-in-Furness, Cumbria, England

Coordinates: 54.103°N 3.232°W

Barrow Island
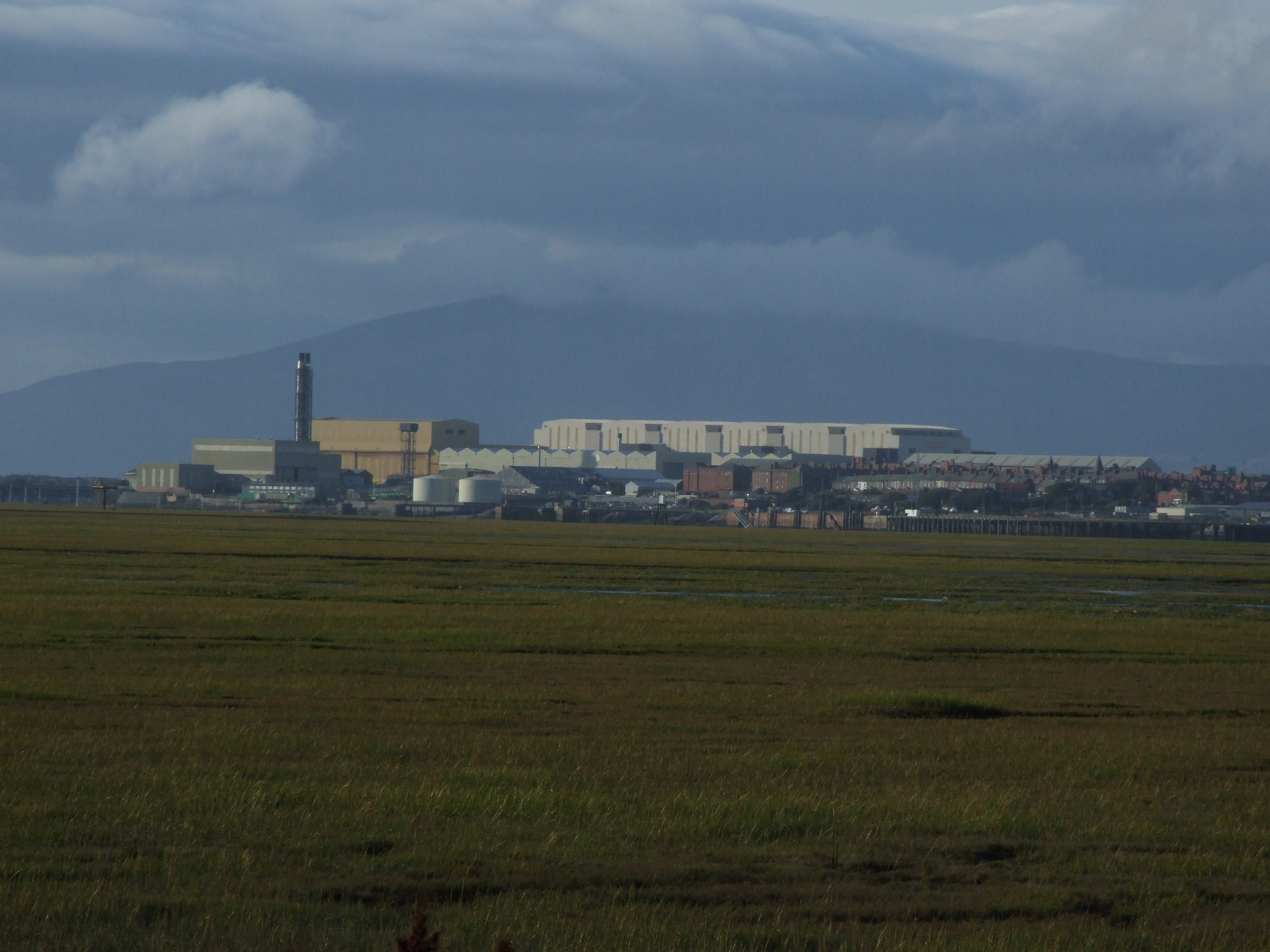
- Panorama of Barrow Island viewed from Walney Channel

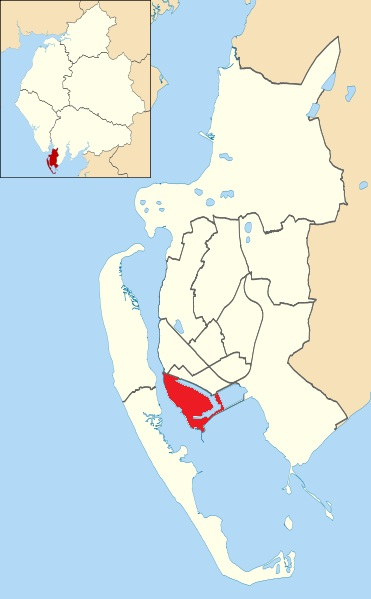
- Barrow Island shown within Barrow-in-Furness
- Population: 2,616 (2011)
- Unitary authority: Westmorland and Furness
- Ceremonial county: Cumbria
- Region: North West
- Country: England
- Sovereign state: United Kingdom
- Post town: BARROW-IN-FURNESS
- Postcode district: LA
- Dialling code: 01229
- Police: Cumbria
- Fire: Cumbria
- Ambulance: North West
- UK Parliament: Barrow and Furness

Barrow Island is an area, current Town Council and former district-level ward of Westmorland and Furness, Cumbria, England. Originally separate from the British mainland, land reclamation in the 1860s saw the northern fringes of the island connected to Central Barrow. Barrow Island is also bound to the south and east by the town's dock system and to the west by Walney Channel. The Ward population taken at the 2011 census was 2,616.

Whilst still an electoral ward for Barrow Town Council, the ward was combined at a district/ local authority level with Central and Hindpool wards in April 2023 following formation of the new Westmorland and Furness local authority and be named 'Old Barrow'.

== Background and history ==
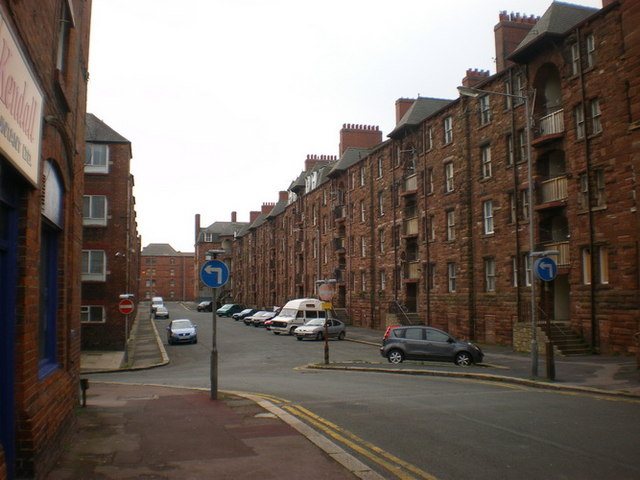
Tenements along Ship Street

The name of the town of Barrow-in-Furness is believed to derive from the Norse word Barrae, meaning Bare Island, which actually referred to Barrow Island. Since the 1860s the island has been connected to the mainland as its channel was modified to form two docks, the Buccleuch Dock and the Devonshire Dock. The remainder of its channel has also now been developed as part of the dock system. The island is also known as 'Old Barrow'.

The Second World War defences constructed around Barrow Island have been documented by William Foot. They included a number of pillboxes to defend the docks. The principal threat was seizure of the docks by airborne troops; a seaborne landing was thought to be highly unlikely unless Ireland was occupied first.

During the late 19th century when most of Barrow Island's tenement housing was constructed the majority quickly became occupied by Scottish and Irish working class immigrants who worked at the town's shipyard, steelworks and jute mill.

Still classed as one of the Islands of Furness, Barrow Island is characterised by densely constructed tenement housing alongside huge industrial buildings. The area is home to the vast majority of Barrow's shipyard including the Devonshire Dock Hall complex - the main occupier of the reclaimed land from Walney Channel. In 2011, the ward's population stood at 2,616 which although relatively small compared to Barrow's other wards equates to a higher population density, and twice the national average. The island has become notorious for its high unemployment rate and a number of other social issues which saw it feature in a 2009 episode of The Secret Millionaire.

Barrow Island, which is nicknamed 'Baz I' locally, is served by a primary school, nursery school, two churches, several pubs, post office, pharmacy and a number of small supermarkets. Work is currently underway to convert a former shipyard canteen/arts centre into two new retail units with office space.

With a previous unoccupancy rate of 80%, 320 of the apartments have been converted into serviced accommodation called 'The Maritime Apartments', costing around £5 million to refurbish. These are popular with contracted BAE workers, offshore wind farm and rig engineers and those in the construction industry. The land surrounding the apartments and along the main roads has benefited from a £1 million landscaping project to create parks, open spaces and growing areas. These are now known as the 'Maritime Streets'.

Barrow Island is also home to a large business park currently under construction as part of the £200 million Waterfront Barrow-in-Furness project. The business park will be built over a period of 15 years and once complete, it is expected to have created between 1,200 and 1,600 highly skilled jobs.

In 2018 Barrow Island featured in news stories when it was revealed that over a 12-month period no books were loaned from its library, based in Barrow Island Primary School.

=== Shipyard ===
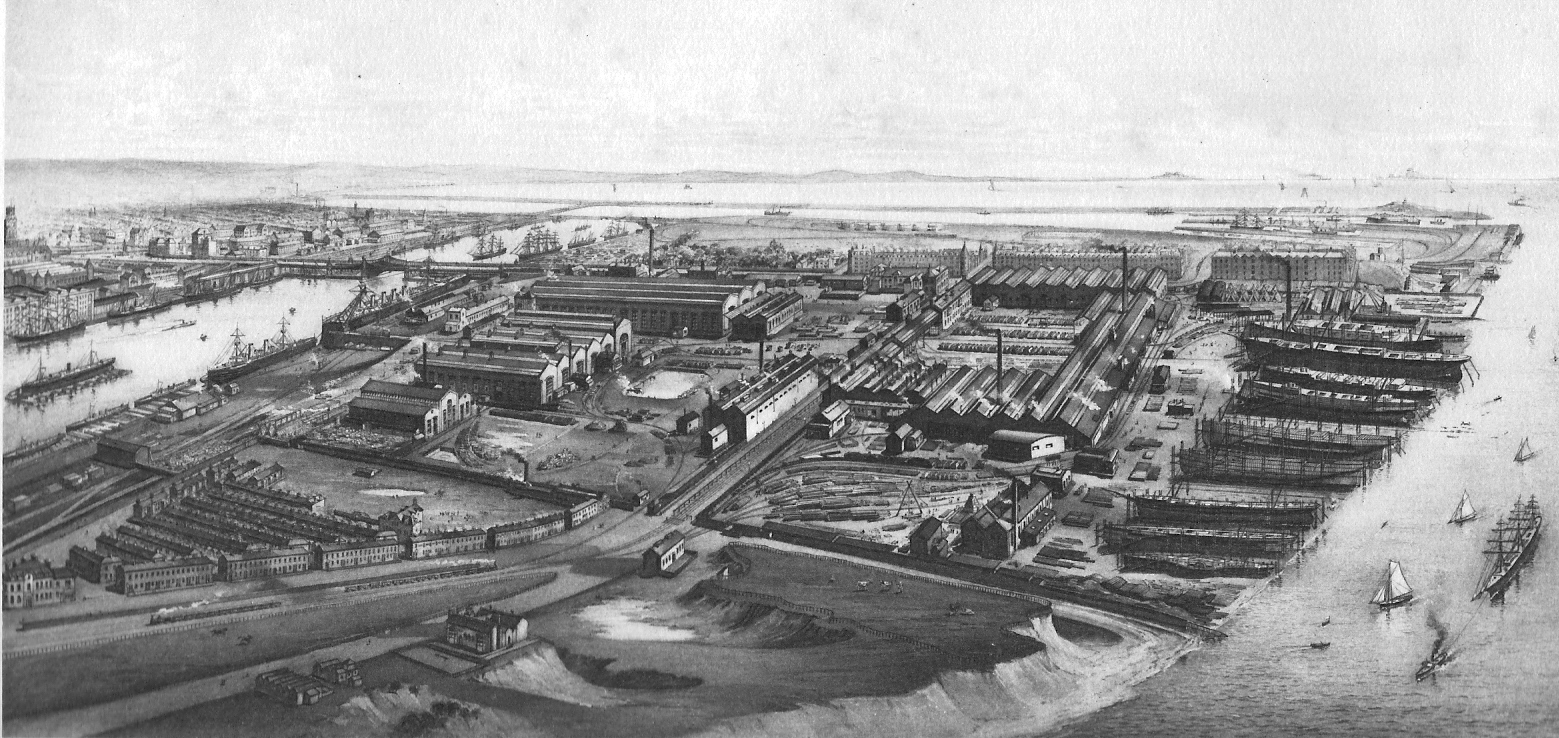
Barrow Island seen in 1890 dominated by its shipbuilding works

The island is home to Barrow Shipyard, owned now by BAE Systems. Former owners included the Barrow Iron Ship-Building Company, Vickers Shipbuilding, VSEL and Marconi Marine (VSEL), which became part of BAE in 1999. The shipyard remains one of the largest in the United Kingdom, rivalled only by that of Govan. The island also forms a major part of the Royal Port of Barrow, owned by Associated British Ports. A large portion of the Waterfront Barrow-in-Furness is planned to be constructed on Barrow Island.

The urbanisation of Barrow Island came about entirely as a result of the booming shipyard. Many of the existing shipyard buildings were constructed by VSEL, including the huge Heavy Engineering Workshop and Devonshire Dock Hall complex. Despite this, current owners, BAE Systems, have ambitious expansion plans on Barrow Island associated with the Trident successor programme.

Barrow Island itself is a conservation area, while many of the shipyard buildings are listed buildings, as are numerous tenement houses including the Grade II* listed Devonshire Buildings.

== Demographics ==
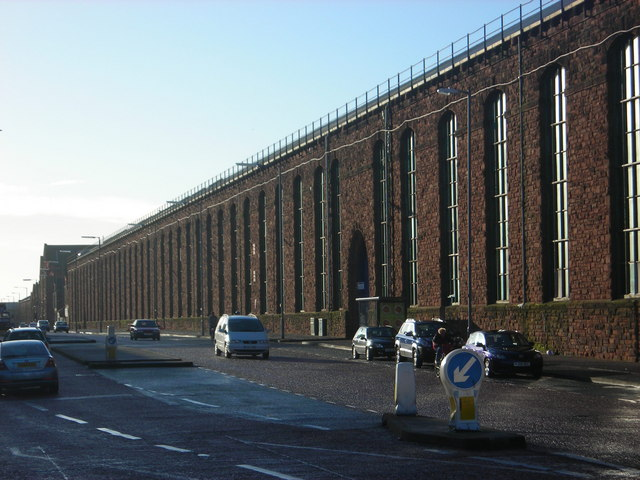
Typical 19th century industrial architecture on Barrow Island

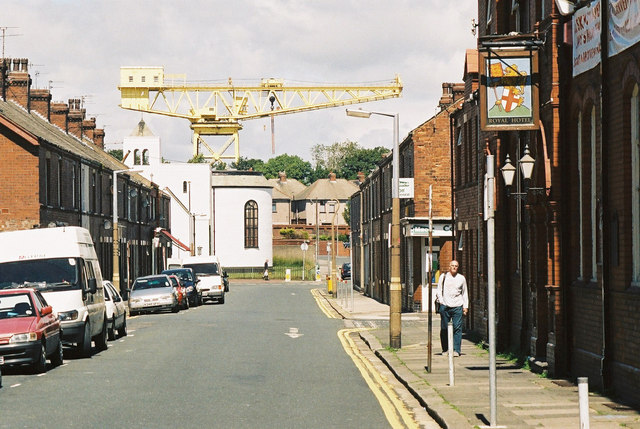
Anchor Road on Barrow Island

According to the 2011 census, males outnumbered females in Barrow Island to significant degree which is in contrast to the Barrow and national averages. The central and western areas of Barrow Island are within the 3% most deprived nationwide, while the more modern eastern areas are within the 20% most deprived. Deprivation is measured in Barrow Island by its high percentage of individuals with long-term illnesses, an unemployment rate almost twice as high as England's average, low levels of the overall degradation of the living environment.

Vital statistics.	Barrow Island	Barrow-in-Furness	England
Males	53.2%	49.5%	49.2%
Females	46.8%	50.5%	50.8%
Individuals in fairly good to good health	70.7%	75.9%	81.4%
Individuals in bad health	29.3%	24.1%	18.6%
People aged 16–74 who are economically active	61.0%	64.0%	66.5%
People aged 16–74 who aren't economically active	39.0%	36.0%	33.5%
People aged 16–74 with no qualifications	28.2%	25.4%	22.5%

== Transport ==
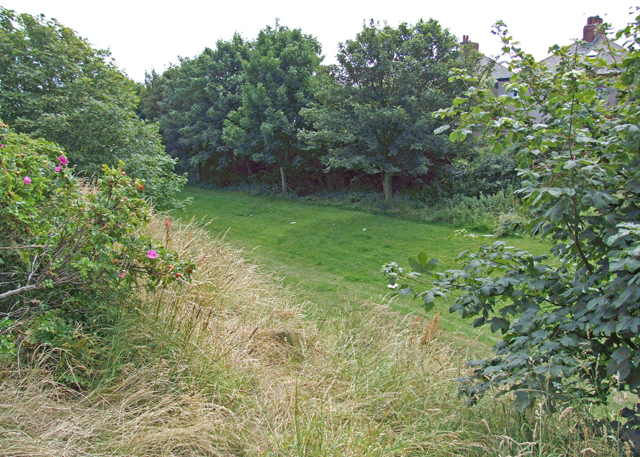
Cavendish Park, once a major railway junction on the island

The A590 trunk road runs across the northern edge of Barrow Island before crossing Walney Bridge and terminating on Walney Island. To the south of Barrow Island, Michaelson Road Bridge is another vehicle and foot bridge that crosses Buccleuch Dock into Central Barrow. Island Road is a wide tree-lined boulevard that acts as the primary artery through Barrow Island's eastern residential areas.

Historically Barrow Island was served by two railways stations, Ramsden Dock and Shipyard Junction as well as the Barrow-in-Furness Tramway. Although all evidence of the railway has gone, tramlines of the tramway are preserved across the island, most noticeably on Island Road and Michaelson Road.

== See also ==
- Islands of Furness
