= Buccleuch Dock =

English dock

Coordinates: 54.1021°N 3.2142°W

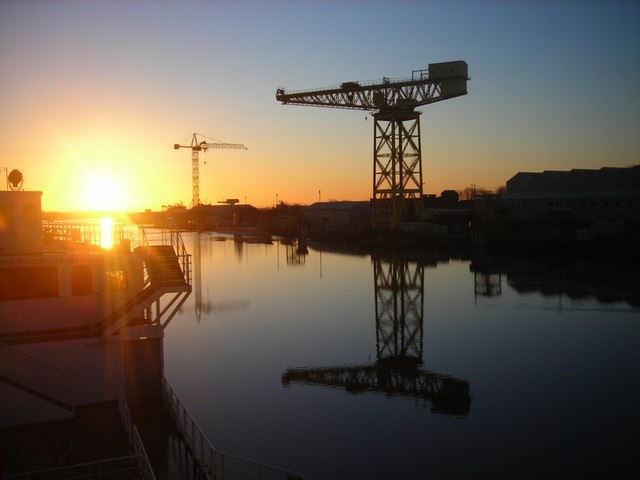
Buccleuch Dock photographed in 2007 including the now demolished landmark hammerhead crane

Buccleuch Dock is one of the four docks which make up the Royal Port of Barrow in Barrow-in-Furness, England. It was constructed between 1863 and 1872 to the same specification as the attached Devonshire Dock - the docks having been separated by a bridge for most of their lifetime. Buccleuch Dock covers 125,000 square metres (1,350,000 sq ft) and was named after the 5th Duke of Buccleuch, who invested heavily in Barrow's public services during the late 19th century. Buccleuch Dock is owned by Associated British Ports and is also used by BAE Systems (previously VSEL) where the majority of the shipyard's surface vessels are docked for fitting out.

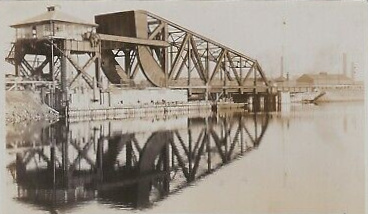
The New Bridge at Buccleuch Dock, Barrow in Furness, circa 1910

== Buccleuch Dock Hammerhead ==
The iconic 50 metres (160 ft) yellow hammerhead crane at Buccleuch Dock was a Barrow landmark for over 60-years up until its demolition in 2011. Assembled in 1942, it replaced a similar crane that was destroyed the year previous during the Barrow Blitz, killing two watchmen in the process. It was used to fit out such vessels as HMS Invincible and SS Oriana, and finally HMS Albion in 2001. Safety concerns and lack of usage in the early 2010s lead to the cranes' future coming under scrutiny. Despite calls for the structure to become listed, it was ultimately dismantled. A scale replica of the crane is now situated on the site acting as a memorial to those killed during the World War II bombing of the shipyard.
