= Ramsden Dock =

Dock in Barrow-in-Furness, England

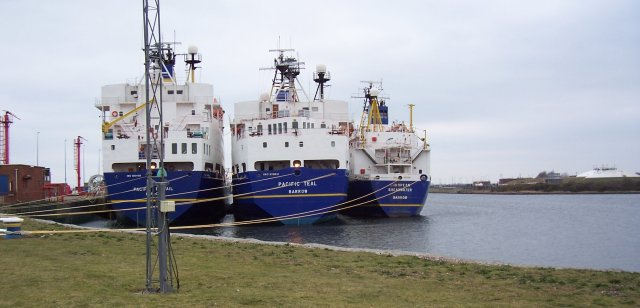
- Three BNFL vessels berthed in Ramsden Dock (2006)

Location
- Country: United Kingdom
- Location: Barrow-in-Furness, Cumbria, England
- Coordinates: 54.1021°N 3.2142°W

Details
- Opened: 1879
- Operated by: Associated British Ports
- Type of harbour: Enclosed cargo and energy dock
- Size: 162,000 m² (1,740,000 sq ft)

Statistics
- Website; Associated British Ports

Ramsden Dock is one of the four docks which make up the Royal Port of Barrow in Barrow-in-Furness, England. It was constructed between 1872 and 1879 covering 162,000 square metres (1,740,000 sq ft) and named in honour of Sir James Ramsden; a founder of Barrow. Ramsden Dock splits into two parts in the south, the anchor basin and dock basin. Since the infilling of a section of Devonshire Dock in the 1980s, Ramsden Dock has been the only point of entry to Barrow's now enclosed port. Managed by Associated British Ports, Ramsden Dock is by far the busiest of the four dock in terms of cargo tonnage, handling shipments of limestone, sand, aggregates and granite. Ramsden Dock and the Royal Port of Barrow as a whole are highly involved in the energy sector and the nearby Rampside Gas Terminal, Sellafield nuclear facility and offshore windfarms. The port office is located adjacent to Ramsden Dock. Powerboat racing often takes place in Ramsden Dock, while a proposed redevelopment scheme of the area incorporates a watersports centre within the dock.

Historically, Ramsden Dock was a major transportation hub with a dedicated railway station connected to a branch of the Furness Railway and a terminus of the Barrow-in-Furness Tramway. A passenger ferry terminal at the dock was utilised by the Isle of Man Steam Packet Company and Barrow Steam Navigation Company offering steamer services to the likes of Belfast and Douglas, Isle of Man. A rail line along the eastern perimeter of Ramsden Dock remains in use to this day with freight services to and from the dock.
