= VSEL Heavy Engineering Workshop =

Factory in Barrow-in-Furness, Cumbria, England

Coordinates: 54.106°N 3.231°W

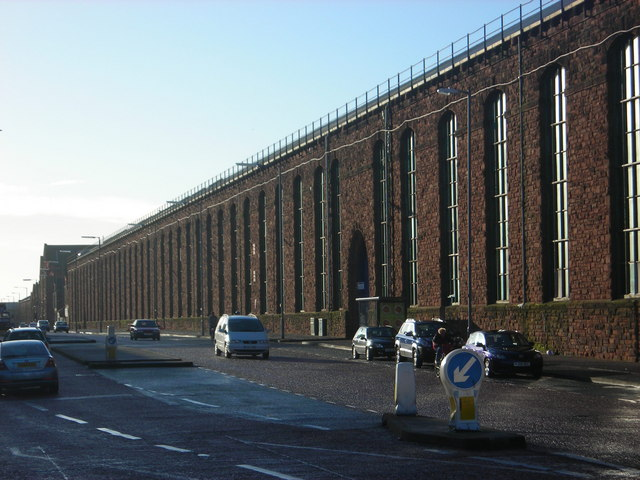
The Gun Works from Michaelson Road in 2007

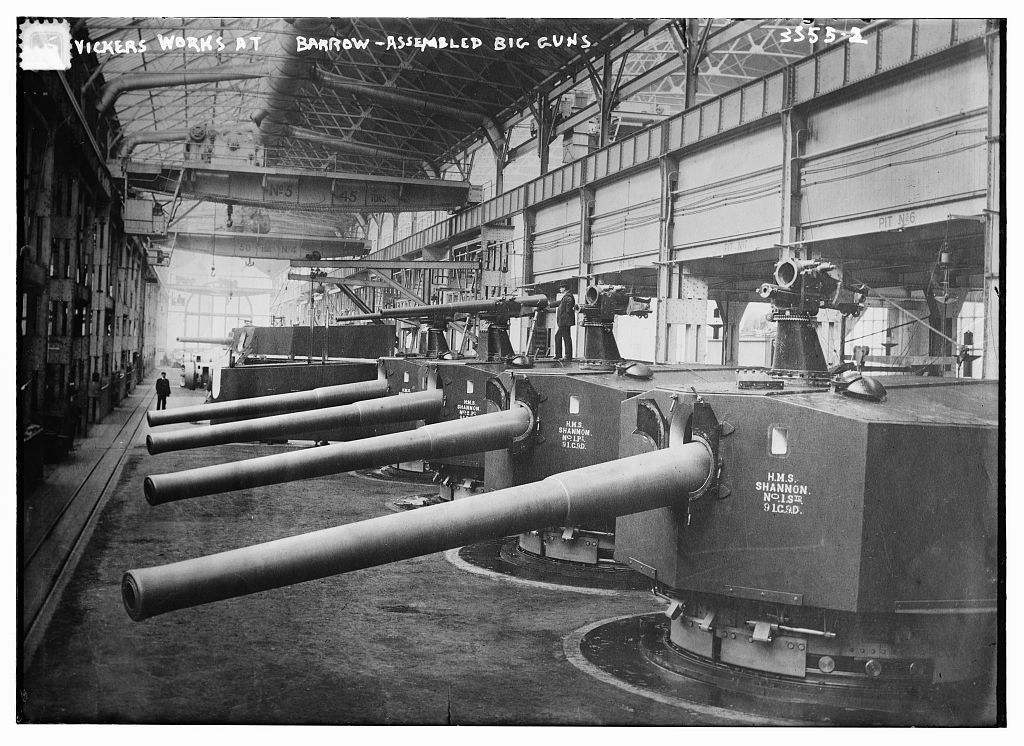
Guns being assembled for HMS Shannon in the workshop in 1906

The VSEL Heavy Engineering Workshop located at Michaelson Road in the Barrow Island area of Barrow-in-Furness, Cumbria, England is a Grade II listed former ammunitions workshop that belonged to Vickers Shipbuilding and Engineering. Known locally as the 'Gun Shop' the vast complex was constructed in stages between 1875 and 1900 and consists of 42 by 11 bays (roughly 1,100 feet (335 m) by 360 feet (110 m) or over 9 acres (3.6 ha) of land - a larger footprint than nearby Devonshire Dock Hall). The building was a major component of the engineering division within Vickers and supplied the British Army and Royal Navy throughout World War I and World War II. Everything from basic shells to heavy duty gun turrets for ships, tanks and other land vehicles were produced and assembled at the workshop. The Historic England states the following of the building: 'It clearly indicates the scale of operation of the shipbuilding and engineering works at the turn of the century; its roadside frontages make a major contribution to the industrial scene in a town where the buildings of other major C19 industries have been almost completely swept away.'

The Gun Works is now owned by BAE Systems which operates their Submarine and Land & Armaments divisions in Barrow.
