= The Waterfront Barrow-in-Furness =

Project
- Opening date: 2020 (est.)
- Developer: Furness Enterprise Ltd
- Architect: Capita Symonds
- Website: www.waterfrontbpbarrow.com

Location
- Interactive map of The Waterfront Barrow-in-Furness
- Location in Cumbria
- Coordinates: 54.1012°N 3.2192°W
- Country: England
- County: Cumbria
- Location: Barrow-in-Furness

Area
  - Total: 160 ha (400 acres)

The Waterfront Barrow-in-Furness is a £200 million development under construction in and around the Port of Barrow, England. The site covers an area of some 400 acres (160 ha) and was due for completion in 2020. The internal road network is already complete, with construction of a large business park complex ongoing and work on a 400-berth marina and 650 home Marina Village due to start thereafter. In 2010, The Waterfront Barrow-in-Furness ranked as the ninetieth most costly regeneration project in the United Kingdom by Regeneration & Renewal. Progress on the project stalled between 2010 and 2016 due to complications with funding following the disabandonment of the North West Regional Development Agency. BAE Systems opened a large logistics warehouse named the Resolution Building on Dova Way within the designated Business Park Area in October 2016, while and construction of a new access road from Salthouse Road to the Marina Village commenced in May 2017.

== Background and history ==
A 400-berth marina is planned for Buccleuch Dock and the Barrow Island side of Ramsden Dock. The Marina Village which will be located between Buccleuch and Cavendish Docks will contain some 650 homes, numerous shops, restaurants and hotels. A multi-purpose stadium has also been proposed to occupy the eastern part of the Marina Village. This stage of the waterfront is due for completion in late 2020. A large business park on Barrow Island is expected to be the first part of the Waterfront to be fully completed. A watersports centre and wetland area to the north of Cavendish Dock are two other aspects of the development, alongside a new landmark footbridge over Bucleuch Dock to accompany the already functioning Michaelson Road bridge. However the most beneficial aspect of the Waterfront to Barrow's status as a port town is the proposed cruise ship terminal, numerous ocean liners have visited Barrow over recent years, but a designated purpose-built terminal building is hoped to significantly increase the number of liners that visit the town.

For years large parts of the port of Barrow and Barrow Island in general were run down and neglected, master plans were drawn up for a new multimillion-pound development that would bring new life to the area. Companies such as Cumbria Vision, West Lakes Renaissance, Barrow Borough Council and the Northwest Regional Development Agency soon became involved to raise Barrow's status as the primary gateway into the Lake District and bringing new business to the area which is seen as Britain's 'Energy Coast'. This is due to the large number of local producers of energy including Barrow Offshore Wind, Rampside Gas Terminal, Roosecote Power Station and Sellafield.

=== Progress ===
The Waterfront development was approved for construction in 2007, with work beginning clearing the site the same year. As of March 2010, the business parks were under construction with the new road network and all transportation links having been complete already (see Transportation section).

Dozens of companies are involved in the development and construction of the site. Marketing is being led by the main developer, Furness Enterprise although it is also supported by SLPR, Bluepole and HSP Milners. Capita Symonds is the design consultant, whilst the lead contractor comes in the form of Carillion. Some local Sub Contractors include: Mike Marsh Plant Hire, Deltawaite, Neil Price and Simmonds. In July 2010 there were concerns that the project could be put on hold or scrapped all together due to lack of funds as a result of government cutbacks, however plans soon emerged to go ahead with the Marina Village and fund the marina itself with receipts from property sales within the village, although this isn't expected to commence until possibly 2018.

== Areas of the waterfront ==
=== Business parks ===
There is a heavy focus on bringing new business to the area, and three business parks are to form a large part of the overall development. The waterfront business parks are proposed to cover a total land area of 23 hectares (57 acres). The first of the business parks (Ramsden Business Park) to be built will cover an area of 8.39 hectares, and will consist of four plots ranging in floorspace from 2,050 to 8,400 square metres (22,066 to 90,417 sq ft). St Andrews Business Park and Anchor Line Business Park will follow thereafter, however the exact figures and information about facilities are yet to be provided by the developer. Early estimates project each acre on the business park complex come to a cost of £100,000. Companies that also have offices and a strong presence in and around the Port of Barrow include the likes of Associated British Ports, BAE Systems Submarine Solutions, James Fisher & Sons, Centrica and British Nuclear Group to name a few. The business parks are expected to create between 1,500 and 2,000 new jobs and contribute greatly to the local economy. VUE Construction has been appointed to carry out phase 2 of the project, which includes decontamination, site clearance and installation of utilities. Work started in August, 2016.

=== Cruise ship terminal ===
Due to Barrow's proximity to the Lake District, it is seen as the principal gateway to the world-famous national park via sea. Numerous cruise ships have called at the port of Barrow in recent years for passengers to visit the Lake District as well as numerous more local sites such as Furness Abbey and the Dock Museum. However part of the waterfront development is to build a designated cruise ship terminal which will have facilities to handle such vessels any time of the year, and will encourage a considerably larger number of ships to visit the port. The only other cruise ship terminal on the north west coast of England is in Liverpool. The initiative is being led by Cumbria Tourism which has so far invested £9 million into the project. In July 2010, plans for the cruise ship terminal were put on hold until there is actual significant demand to accommodate larger vessels at the port. It is the only part of The Waterfront development that has been effectively 'scrapped', as more focus is placed upon the marina and marina village.

Cruise ships that have called at the port of Barrow since 2000 are:

- Ocean Majesty of Page & Moy
- Silver Wind of Silversea Cruises
- Black Prince of Fred. Olsen & Co. (June 2003)
- Arion of Arcalia Shipping (August 2003)
- Minerva II of Swan Hellenic (September 2004)
- Deutschland of Peter Deilmann Cruises (May and June 2005)
- Prinsendam of Holland America Line (July 2008)
- Tahitian Princess of Princess Cruises (May 2009)
- Adonia of P&O Cruises (June 2014)

=== Marina ===
Even before the waterfront development was proposed, there was demand for a new marina in Barrow. However, after it was approved, interest soared even further. Eight sailing clubs reported immediate demand for berths and winter storage. The new marina will come at a cost of £8 million and will be able to accommodate up to 400 privately owned boats at any one time. An overland boat lift has also been proposed with access for up to six boats simultaneously, with 24-hour-a-day access, although the construction of a short canal is currently the preferred option. Marina berths will be located on the mainland side of Buccleuch Dock, whilst further berths will be situated on the Barrow Island side of Ramsden Dock.

=== Marina Village ===
The Marina Village is one of the most ambitious areas of the development. The new settlement will be home to 650 houses of varying styles and sizes (some of which can be seen in the gallery below). Based upon the average 2.5 persons per household in the UK, Marina Village will add approximately 1,500 to the local population. The village will cover an area of 18 hectares (44 acres), and besides the residential buildings, will also contain a number of hotels, shops and restaurants. There will be a main village square alongside the actual waterfront with a number of smaller squares, public spaces and playground being located throughout the rest of the complex. A large athletics track is also earmarked for construction, with the possibility of a large multi-purpose stadium that could be used as the joint home ground for Barrow A.F.C. and Barrow Raiders - currently at Holker Street and Craven Park respectively. Work on the village started in February 2017, with road upgrades to Salthouse road and the construction of a new junction onto the site.

A new landmark footbridge across Buccluech Dock is also part of the Marina Village development; the only other crossing over the dock is Michaelson Road Bridge. The planned pedestrian footbridge will serve as the most iconic piece within the waterfront development and will connect south Marina Village to the Ramsden Dock marina service area and business park complex.

=== Nature reserve ===
A new wetland nature reserve is to be formed to the very north of the waterfront development. There are already two famed nature reserves in Barrow, however both are on Walney Island. Cavendish Dock is used as a reservoir for Roosecote Power Station, this has in turn raised the water temperature within the Dock and created an environment of unique ecological interest. £2 million is to be invested into creating the nature reserve, whilst Cumbria County Council has been made responsible for landscaping the surrounding area.

=== Transportation ===
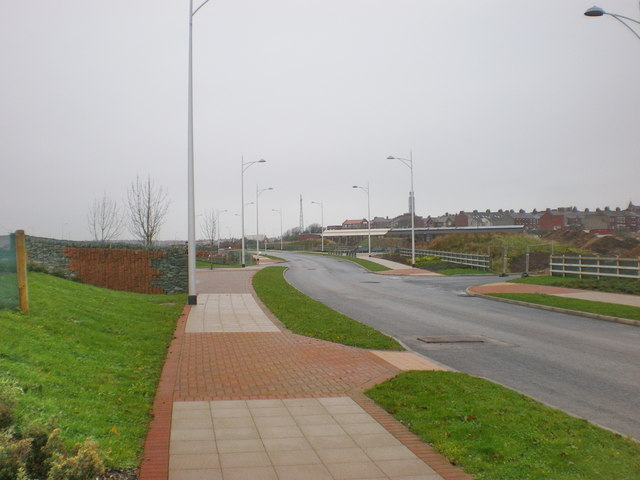
The newly constructed Harding Rise

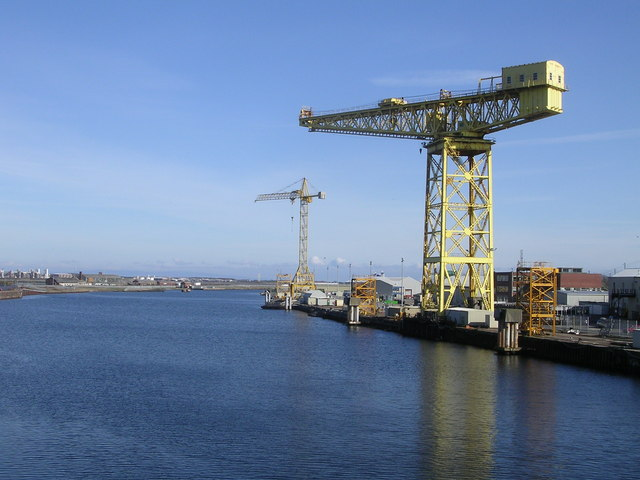
Buccleuch Dock will soon be transformed to become part of the Waterfront Barrow-in-Furness

A £5 million access road that links Michaelson Road to the waterfront development was opened in March 2010, the link road entitled Harding Rise means the port of Barrow can be easily accessed my large good vehicles and general commuters rather than having to drive through the residential areas of Barrow Island (namely along Ramsden Dock Road). Considerable amounts of landscaping have also taken place alongside the road and its adjacent pathways. Harding Rise has a carriageway width of 10 metres (33 ft), whilst the main roundabout located at this entrance to the waterfront has an inscribed circle diameter of 45 metres (148 ft). Two other large roads which have been complete and run through the Barrow Island part of the waterfront are Ramsey Way and Dova Way which are 10 metres (33 ft) and 7.3 metres (24 ft) wide respectively. The Marina Village will take up a large part of south-central Barrow and although many roads will be demolished, the main thorough throughs of Rawlinson Street and The Strand will remain.

Bridge Road connects the waterfront development to the A590 and eventually Junction 36 of the M6 motorway. Besides road transport, the site is also in close proximity to Barrow-in-Furness and Roose railway stations. Barrow/Walney Island Airport also serves Barrow, however is used primarily by BAE Systems. The nearest international airports to the waterfront development are Blackpool International Airport, Manchester Airport and Liverpool John Lennon Airport.

=== Water sports centre ===
Water sports have been occurring in and around the port of Barrow for years, however there are no designated centres or sites for this. Since 2003, Ramsden Dock has held host to the Formula 2 National Grand Prix Power Boat racing which attracted some 35,000 visitors annually. Barrow, its docks and the Walney Channel have also become ever more popular with power boat racing since speed restrictions were placed on nearby Windermere. The water sports centre which forms part of the waterfront will be located on the northern side of Ramsden Dock and will cater for canoeing, sailing, wind-surfing and power boat racing.

== See also ==
- List of seaports
- List of marinas
- Urban regeneration
- Barrow-in-Furness
- Port of Barrow
- Central Barrow
- Barrow Island
