= HMS Dreadnought (Dreadnought-class submarine) =

British nuclear-powered submarine

History

United Kingdom
- Name: HMS Dreadnought
- Ordered: July 2016
- Builder: BAE Systems, Barrow-in-Furness, England
- Laid down: 20 March 2025

General characteristics
- Class & type: Dreadnought-class submarine
- Displacement: 17,200 t (16,900 long tons; 19,000 short tons)
- Length: 153.6 metres (504 ft)
- Beam: 12.8 m (42 ft 0 in)
- Draught: 12 m (39 ft 4 in)
- Propulsion: Rolls-Royce PWR3 nuclear reactor, turbo-electric drive, pump-jet
- Speed: At least 20 knots (37 km/h; 23 mph)
- Complement: 130
- Armament: 4 × 21 inch (533 mm) torpedo tubes for: Spearfish heavyweight torpedoes; 12 × ballistic missile tubes for: Lockheed Trident II D5 SLBMs

HMS Dreadnought is a Royal Navy nuclear-powered Trident ballistic missile-armed submarine that is currently under construction. The lead boat of her class, she is being built in Barrow-in-Furness. On completion she will become the UK's largest ever submarine.

== Construction ==
The submarine was approved for order by the UK Parliament in July 2016. Construction of Dreadnought began on 6 October 2016. In December 2021 it was announced that the submarine will feature Lockheed Martin navigation subsystems. Other systems will include a new Thales Sonar 2076 system. Much of the steel for the construction has been sourced from non-domestic sources. In March 2021, it was announced that construction of the submarine had been delayed due to the impact of the COVID-19 pandemic. In May 2022, it was announced that construction had entered 'phase three' and that on completion, the submarine would leave the shipyard in Barrow-in-Furness to begin sea trials.

On 14 December 2022, the pressure hull of the submarine was completed. On 29 December 2022, the 12 ballistic missile tubes of Dreadnought, along with 36 tubes for the others in her class arrived in the UK from the US.

Her keel was formally laid by Sir Keir Starmer on 20 March 2025.
