= Dock Museum =

Museum in Barrow-in-Furness, England

The Dock Museum
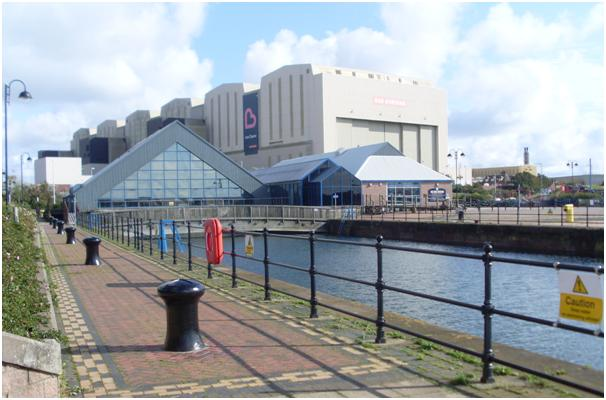
- The Dock Museum seen facing southwards towards Devonshire Dock Hall

- Location in Barrow-in-Furness Borough Location in Cumbria
- Established: 1907 (as Furness Museum)
- Location: North Road, Barrow-in-Furness, England, United Kingdom
- Coordinates: 54.1121°N 3.2400°W
- Collection size: 2,100 objects
- Visitors: 52,000 (2015)
- Website: dockmuseum.org.uk

The Dock Museum is situated in Barrow-in-Furness, Cumbria, England. Most of its exhibits concern the history of the town, focusing on the shipbuilding industry at VSEL (now BAE Systems), the steelworks industry — of which Barrow once had the world's largest, the Furness Railway and the World War II bombings of the town. There has been a museum in Barrow since 1907 and in its current location since 1994, when 50,000 people visited it in its first year, visitor numbers peaked at 120,000 in 2001. The museum has free entry and remains under public ownership.

== Exhibits ==
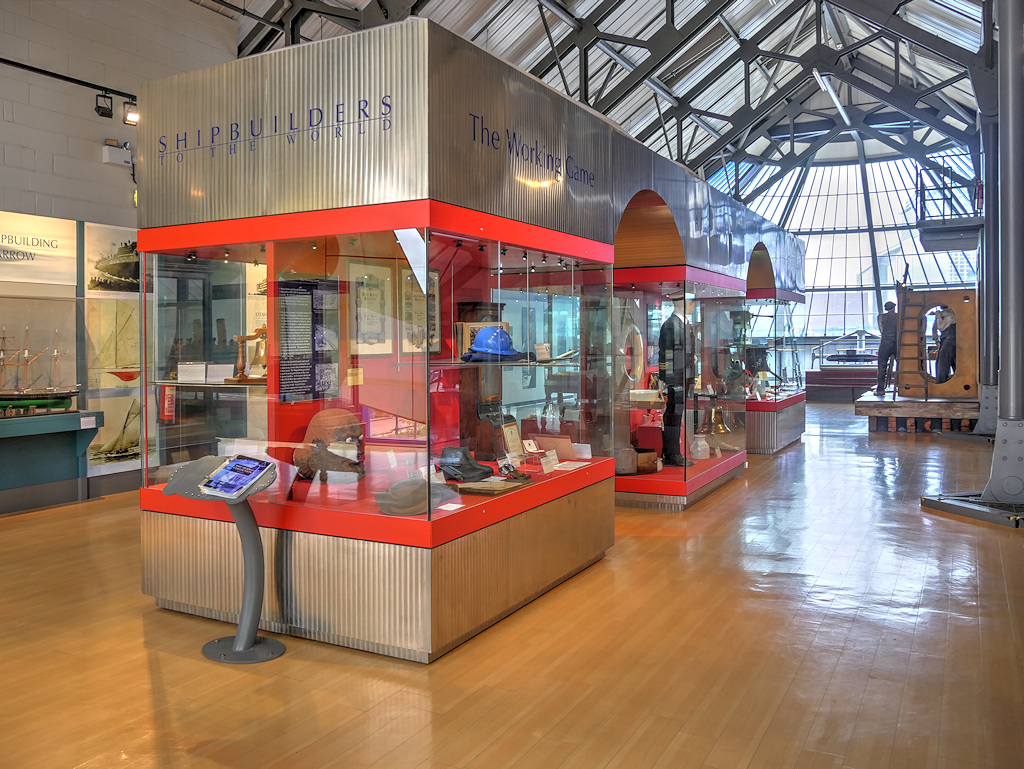
Exhibits within the Dock Museum

On initial entrance to the museum, the ground floors galleries are about the town's history, its rapid mushrooming, as well as how it was affected by World War II. The largest part of the museum is housed in a former dry dock, where three floors containing models of ships and submarines built in Barrow, along with other exhibits can be found. The Vickers Photographic Archive, an archive of 10,000 glass plate negatives donated by the shipyard, was once available online. There are changing temporary exhibitions, two historic, locally-built vessels as well as a filmshow illustrating the town's past and present on the very bottom floor. The museum takes its name from the dock in which it is built. This is the oldest part of the museum, opened in 1872, and is one of its main attractions. The Dock Museum focuses largely on Barrow-in-Furness and its immediate surroundings. It is a common misconception that it is solely a maritime museum. The museum has a strong prehistory collection, natural history artefacts, domestic furnishings, toys and maritime objects. The Furness Hoard of Viking artefacts discovered in 2011 is currently being held at the museum with hopes it can be acquired after being valuated.

=== Museum boats ===
There are currently four small boats preserved at the Dock Museum, including a yacht called White Rose, which was built in the late 19th century; Banshee, a Whammel fishing boat; and the 1914 traditional Morecambe Bay prawner, Nance. The museum's largest vessel—the Watson-class RNLB Herbert Leigh (ON 900)—is sited adjacent to North Road.

== Location and facilities ==
The Dock Museum is located in Barrow-in-Furness alongside the Walney Channel. The Museum has a distinctive shape, and can be seen from the nearby intersection of the A590 road and Hindpool Road. The museum's original large car park was developed into a Premier Inn hotel and Brewers Fayre restaurant in 2014, with current parking now available to the south of the museum directly adjacent to the outdoor play area.

The museum is home to the 'Bridge Coffee Shop', a gift shop, a maritime themed adventure playground, toilets, disabled access, a studio for hire as well as access to the 'Channelside Walk', which leads up to the towns old slag banks, with good views of Barrow, Walney Island, the Lake District and the Isle of Man when the weather permits. It is a fully accessible museum.

== Lease to BAE Systems ==
The lower floor as well as The Studio (previously used to generate income from workshops and events) are now home to BAE Systems HR department. Barrow Borough Council and BAE Systems entered this financial partnership to give prospective employees a good first impression and some local knowledge of the town. Some resistance from regular visitors to the museum was met, but building modifications went ahead and a 25-year lease was signed. All building work was completed in early 2015, and the HR department moved into the museum. The Dock Museum are still offering workshops, events and tours, though in a revised capacity.
