= Royal Port of Barrow =

Dock system in Barrow-in-Furness, England

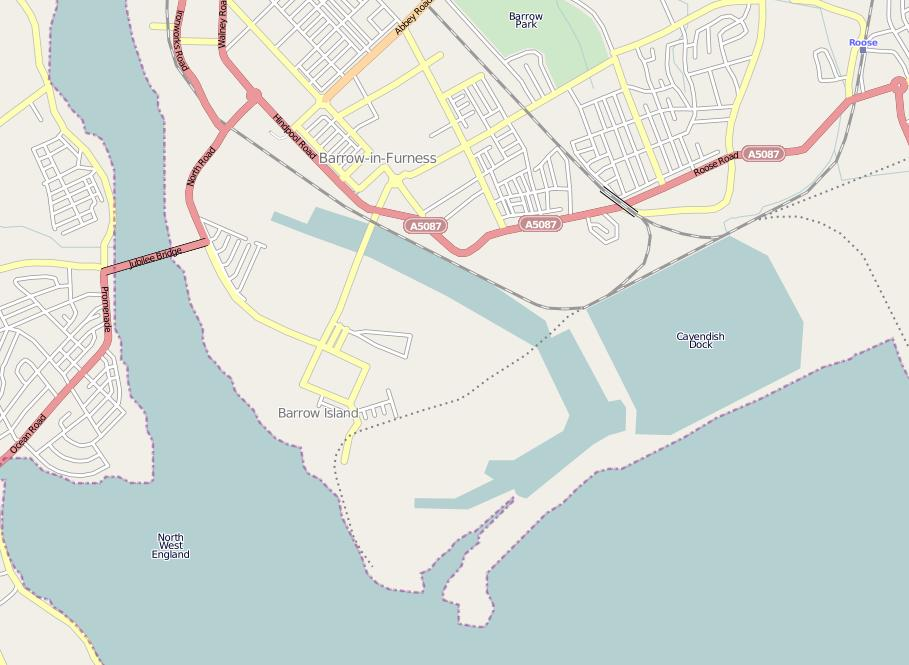
- A map of the port of Barrow
- Interactive map of Royal Port of Barrow
- Location within the United Kingdom

Location
- Country: United Kingdom
- Location: Cumbria
- Coordinates: 54.108°N 3.227°W
- UN/LOCODE: GBBIF

Details
- Operated by: Associated British Ports
- Owned by: ABP
- Type of Harbor: Tidal locked harbour
- No. of berths: 12
- Draft depth: 7.3 m.

Statistics
- Website www.abports.co.uk/locations/barrow/

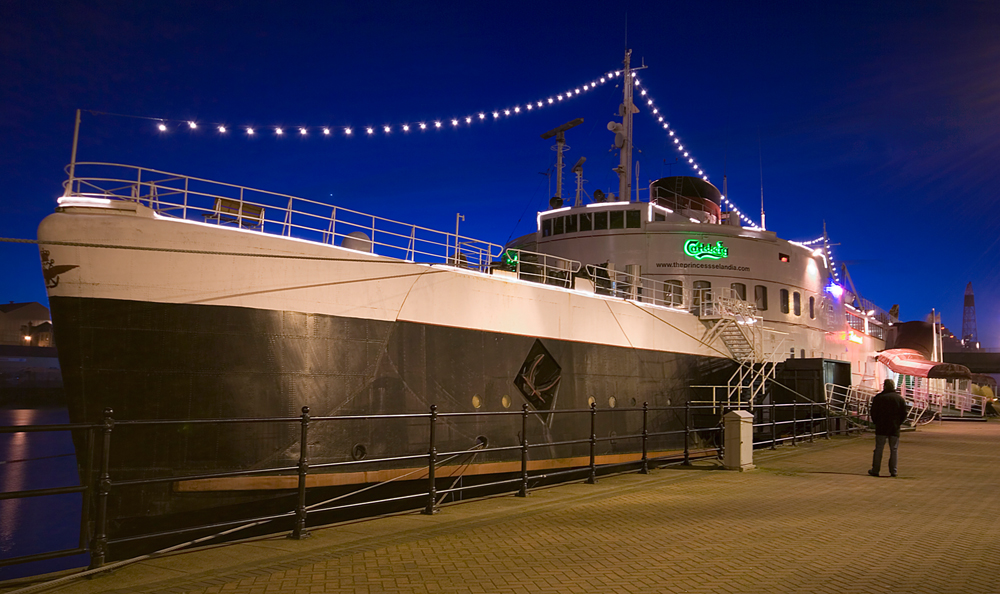
Princess Selandia, an entertainment ship previously berthed in Buccleuch Dock

The Royal Port of Barrow is an enclosed dock system in Barrow-in-Furness, England, comprising four docks. The port is owned and operated by Associated British Ports and is surrounded by Morecambe Bay to the east, and the Irish Sea to the south and west.

The port estate incorporates key areas of the Barrow shipyard, one of the largest shipyards in the United Kingdom and the country's only submarine production facility. It also handles general freight traffic and occasional cruise liners for passengers visiting the nearby Lake District.

The port was granted the title of "Royal" on 22 September 2025 by King Charles III, to reflect the town's contribution to national security.

== History ==
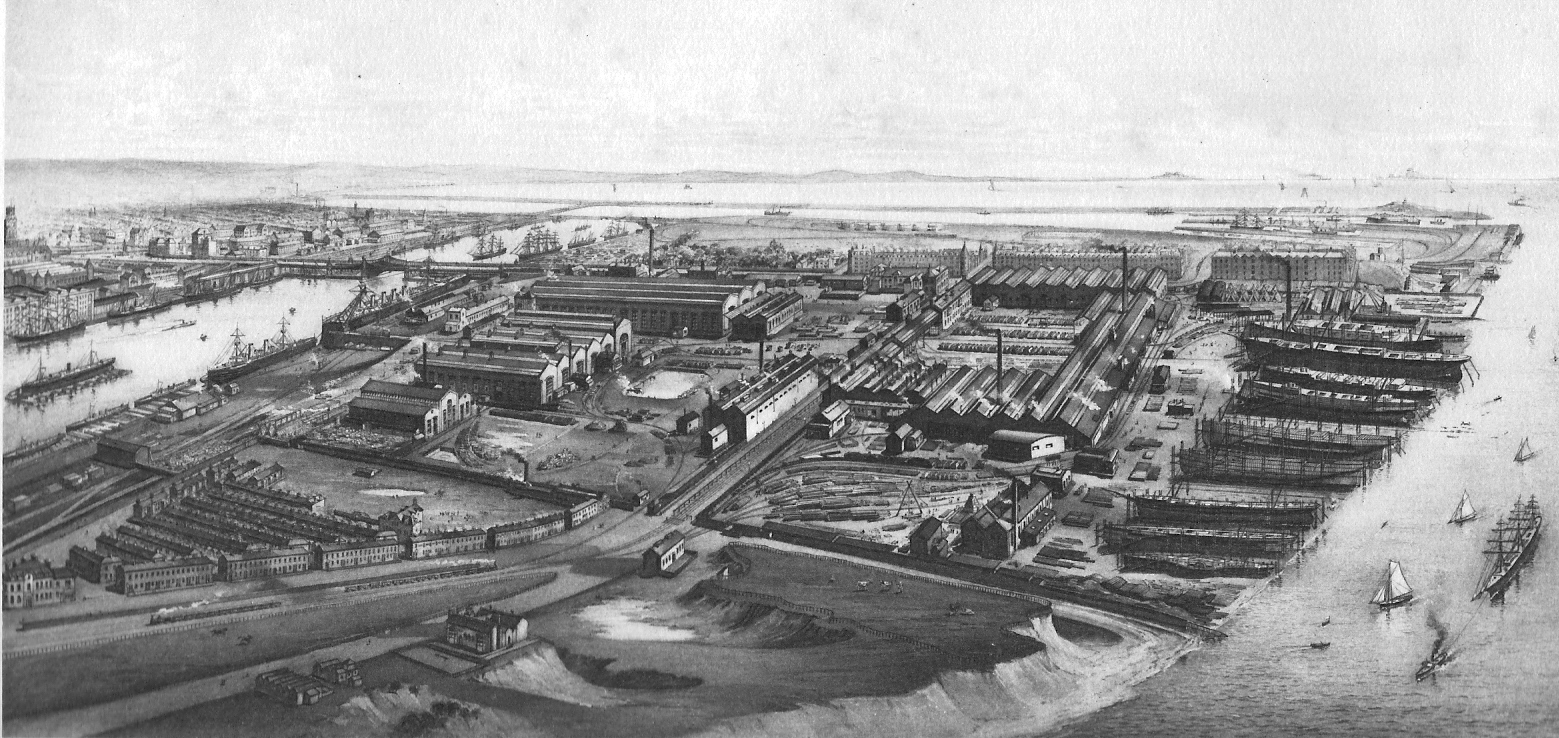
The Port of Barrow and the town's shipyard about 1890

Barrow has a long and complex history of shipbuilding and maritime trade. In the late 19th century, the town had the largest steelworks on Earth, and the Port of Barrow was the main route used to transport the steel produced in the town. Historically, the Port of Barrow and BAE cover a large area, so that Barrow is one of the country's largest shipbuilding centres. Hundreds of warships, aircraft carriers, cruise liners, ferries and submarines have been constructed in Barrow, which remains the only operational submarine production facility in the UK. A 1936 LMS advert said that their 300 acres (120 ha) of water and 400 acres (160 ha) of quays handled 375,000 tons of cargo per year. The port's busiest year was 1956, when 1,155,076 tonnes of iron ore alone were exported.

In 1839 Henry Schneider arrived at Barrow-in-Furness as a young speculator and dealer in iron, and in 1850 he discovered large deposits of haematite. He and other investors founded the Furness Railway, the first section of which opened in 1846 to transport the ore from the slate quarries at Kirkby-in-Furness and haematite mines at Lindal-in-Furness to a deep water harbour near Roa Island. The docks built between 1867 and 1881 in the more sheltered channel between the mainland and Barrow Island replaced the port at Roa Island. The increasing quantities of iron ore mined in Furness were then brought to Barrow to be transported by sea. The sheltered strait between Barrow and Walney Island was an ideal location for the shipyard. The first ship to be built, Jane Roper, was launched in 1852; the first steamship, a 3,000-ton liner named Duke of Devonshire, in 1873. Shipbuilding activity increased, and on 18 February 1871 the Barrow Shipbuilding Company was incorporated. Barrow's relative isolation from the United Kingdom's industrial heartlands meant that the newly-formed company included several capabilities that would usually be subcontracted to other establishments. In particular, a large engineering works was constructed, including a foundry and pattern shop, a forge, and an engine shop. In addition, the shipyard had a joiners' shop, a boat-building shed and a sailmaking and rigging loft.

The Barrow Shipbuilding Company was taken over by the Sheffield steel firm of Vickers in 1897, by which time the shipyard had surpassed the railway and steelworks as the largest employer and landowner in Barrow. The company constructed Vickerstown, modelled on George Cadbury's Bournville, on the adjacent Walney Island in the early 20th century to house its employees. It also commissioned Sir Edwin Lutyens to design Abbey House as a guest house and residence for its managing director, Commander Craven. By the 1890s the shipyard was heavily engaged in the construction of warships for the Royal Navy and also for export. The Royal Navy's first submarine, Holland 1, was built in 1901, and by 1914 the UK had the most advanced submarine fleet in the world, with 94% of it constructed by Vickers. Well-known ships built in Barrow include Mikasa, the Japanese flagship during the 1905 Russo-Japanese War, the liner Oriana and the aircraft carriers HMS Invincible and HMAS Melbourne. During World War II, Barrow was a target for the German Air Force looking to disable the town's shipbuilding capabilities (see Barrow Blitz). Barrow's industry continued to supply the war effort. Winston Churchill once visited the town to launch the aircraft carrier HMS Indomitable. After a rapid decline in the town's steel industry, shipbuilding quickly became Barrow's largest and most important industry. From the 1960s onwards it concentrated its efforts in submarine manufacture, and the UK's first nuclear-powered submarine, HMS Dreadnought was constructed in 1960. HMS Resolution, the Swiftsure, Trafalgar and Vanguard-class submarines all followed.

The end of the Cold War in 1991 marked a reduction in the demand for military ships and submarines, and the town continued its decline. The shipyard's dependency on military contracts at the expense of civilian and commercial engineering and shipbuilding meant it was particularly hard hit as government defence spending was reduced dramatically. The workforce shrank from 14,500 in 1990 to 5,800 in February 1995. The rejection by the VSEL management of detailed plans for Barrow's industrial renewal in the mid-to-late 1980s remains controversial. This has led to interest in the possibilities of converting military-industrial production in declining shipbuilding areas to the offshore renewable energy sector.

== The port today ==
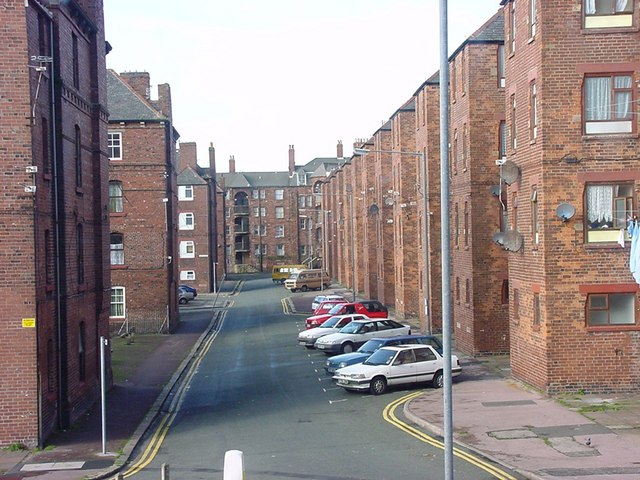
Many of the tenements built in the late 1800s on Barrow Island for dock workers are listed buildings

=== Exports and imports ===
The port of Barrow has seen a big decrease in trade since steel production in the town halted; but many local businesses rely heavily on the port to import and export goods. Some 75,000 tonnes of wood pulp per year are now imported here from Flushing, Netherlands, and transported to the Kimberly-Clark plant in Ormsgill. In the 1980's and 1990's the port of Barrow exported locally quarried limestone to parts of Scandinavia to be used in the paper industry and in the production of industrial gases.

The south side of the port is rail connected which links to the West Coast Main Line via the Furness Line.

The port plays a major role in the region's energy production. Spirit Energy (Centrica) used to operate a gas condensate-storage site in Ramsden Dock, through which the liquid by-product of gas production at the nearby Rampside Gas Terminal was exported. The PNTL vessels Pacific Heron, Pacific Egret and Pacific Grebe are based at the port of Barrow, and are used to transport nuclear material to and from various locations around the world. The port also played an important role in the construction of the Barrow Offshore Wind Farm, which was completed in 2006 and which was one of the UK's first offshore wind farms. The port has been involved in the construction of other offshore windfarms in the East Irish Sea including Walney 1 and 2, Walney Extension, West of Duddon Sands and Ormonde. Various components including monopiles, transition pieces, offshore cables and aggregates have been handled at the port for a number of offshore windfarms and substations for the Barrow and Robin Rigg windfarms were built on the quayside at Barrow. The port hosts the Operations and Maintenance Bases for the offshore windfarms referenced above for the operators Orsted (formerly DONG Energy) and Vattenfall.

There are 20 hectares (49 acres) of storage space within the port, owned by Associated British Ports.

The maximum dimensions of vessels that can dock in Barrow are 200 m (656 ft) length by 35 m (115 ft) beam and up to 10 m (33 ft) draught subject to assessment. Typically, visiting vessels are below 150 m in length with available draught depending upon the height of tide.

Significant exports
Material/ Product	Annual amount handled	Notes
Nuclear material	Minimal	

Significant imports
Material/ Product	Annual amount handled	Notes
Granite, and other Aggregates	circa 40,000 tonnes	
Wood pulp	circa 75,000 tonnes	
Steel fabrications	Variable	

=== Cruise ships ===
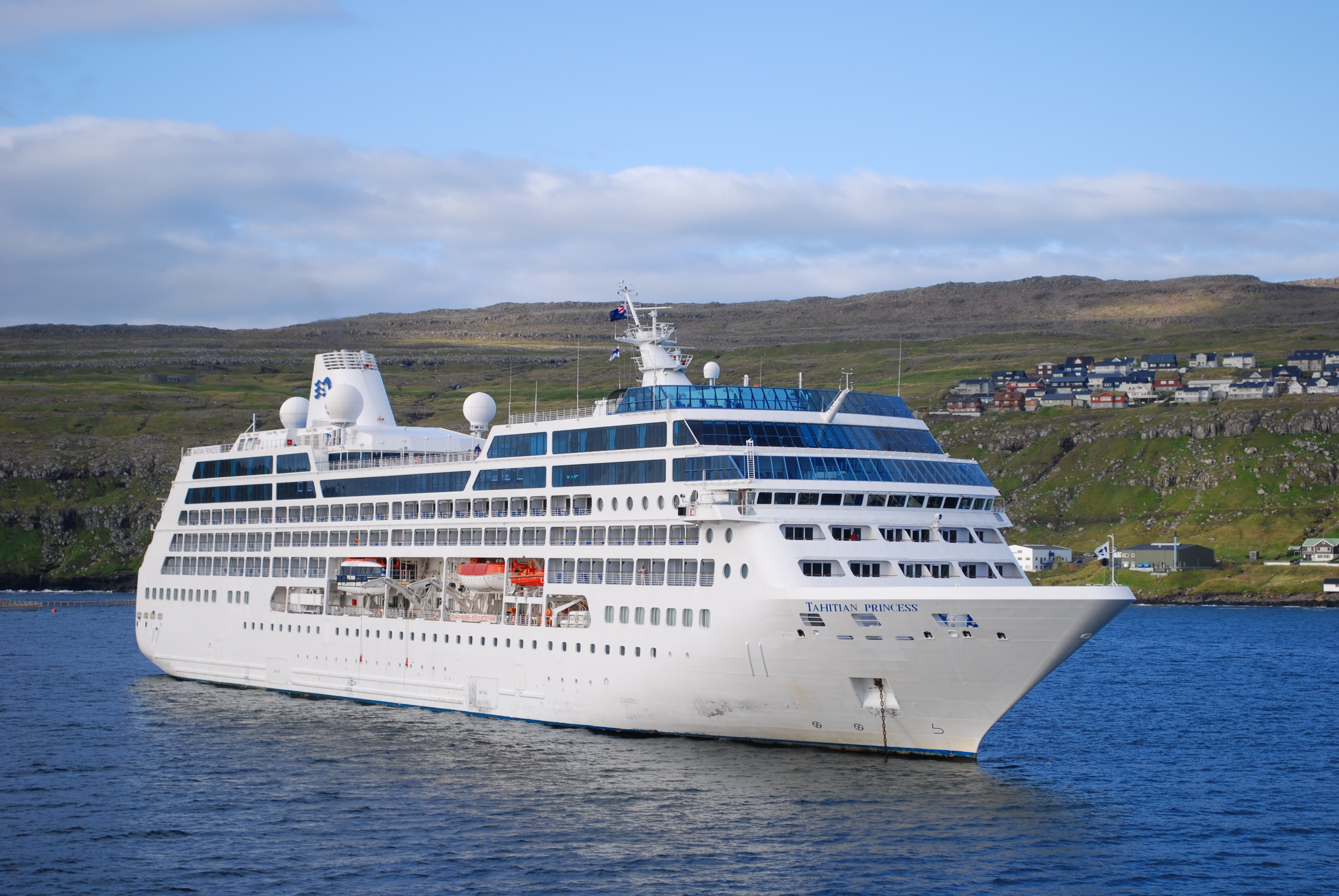
Tahitian Princess visited Barrow in 2009

Barrow itself has some notable tourist attractions (Furness Abbey, Nature Reserves on Walney Island, Piel Castle and the Dock Museum), is quite close to the Lake District, and has been nicknamed "The Gateway to the Lakes". Barrow is the principal port serving Cumbria and the Lake District, and has been a port of call for several cruise ships in recent years. A purpose-built cruise ship terminal in Walney Channel was proposed as part of the multi-million pound waterfront development in 2003. This was subsequently removed from the plans as the cost could not be justified when measured against the economic benefit and size of vessels that could be accommodated.

Some of the cruise ships that have called at the port of Barrow
Name	Operator	Date visited	Notes
Silver Wind	Silversea Cruises	1995	
Ocean Majesty	Page & Moy	2000	
Black Prince	Fred. Olsen & Co.	June 2003	
Arion	Arcalia Shipping	August 2003	
Minerva II	Swan Hellenic	September 2004	
Deutschland	Peter Deilmann Cruises	May 2005	
Deutschland	Peter Deilmann Cruises	June 2006	
Tahitian Princess	Princess Cruises	May 2009	
Adonia	P&O Cruises	June 2014	
Saga Pearl II	Saga Cruises	July 2016	
Braemar	Fred Olsen	August 2016	
Corinthian	Grand Circle Cruise Line	2023 & 2024 multiple calls	

== Future ==
In Autumn 2024, the port published a new Masterplan for the port. This detailed a new vision for the port in the wake of major new investment coming to the town of Barrow over the next two decades. The first proposed masterplan project is Barrow EnergyDock – which provides Barrow’s advanced engineering sector with the power it needs for expansion. The EnergyDock will see a floating solar farm built on Cavendish Dock with a generating capacity of circa 30Mw.

== Gallery ==
Port of Barrow

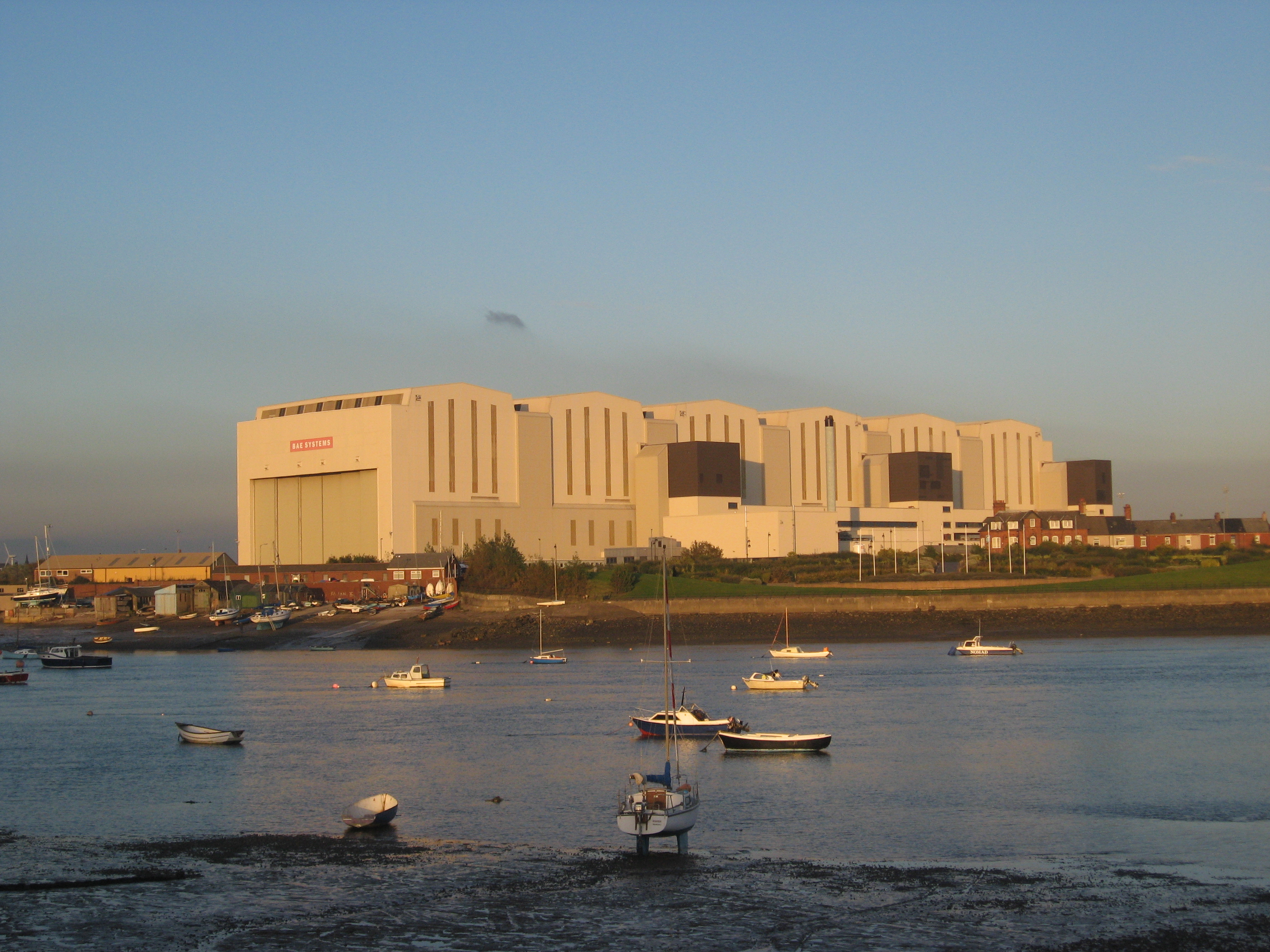
Devonshire Dock Hall is one of the world's largest shipbuilding halls.

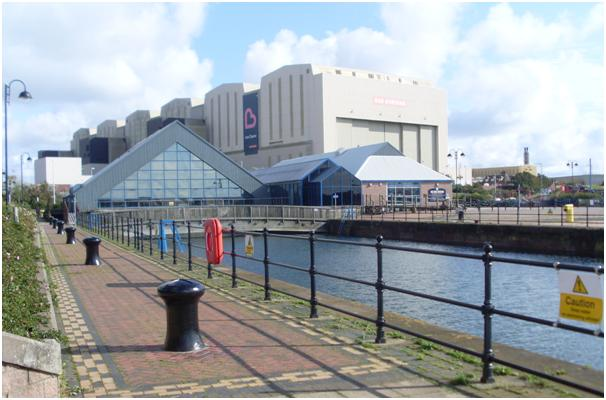
The Dock Museum is built on top of a former dock.

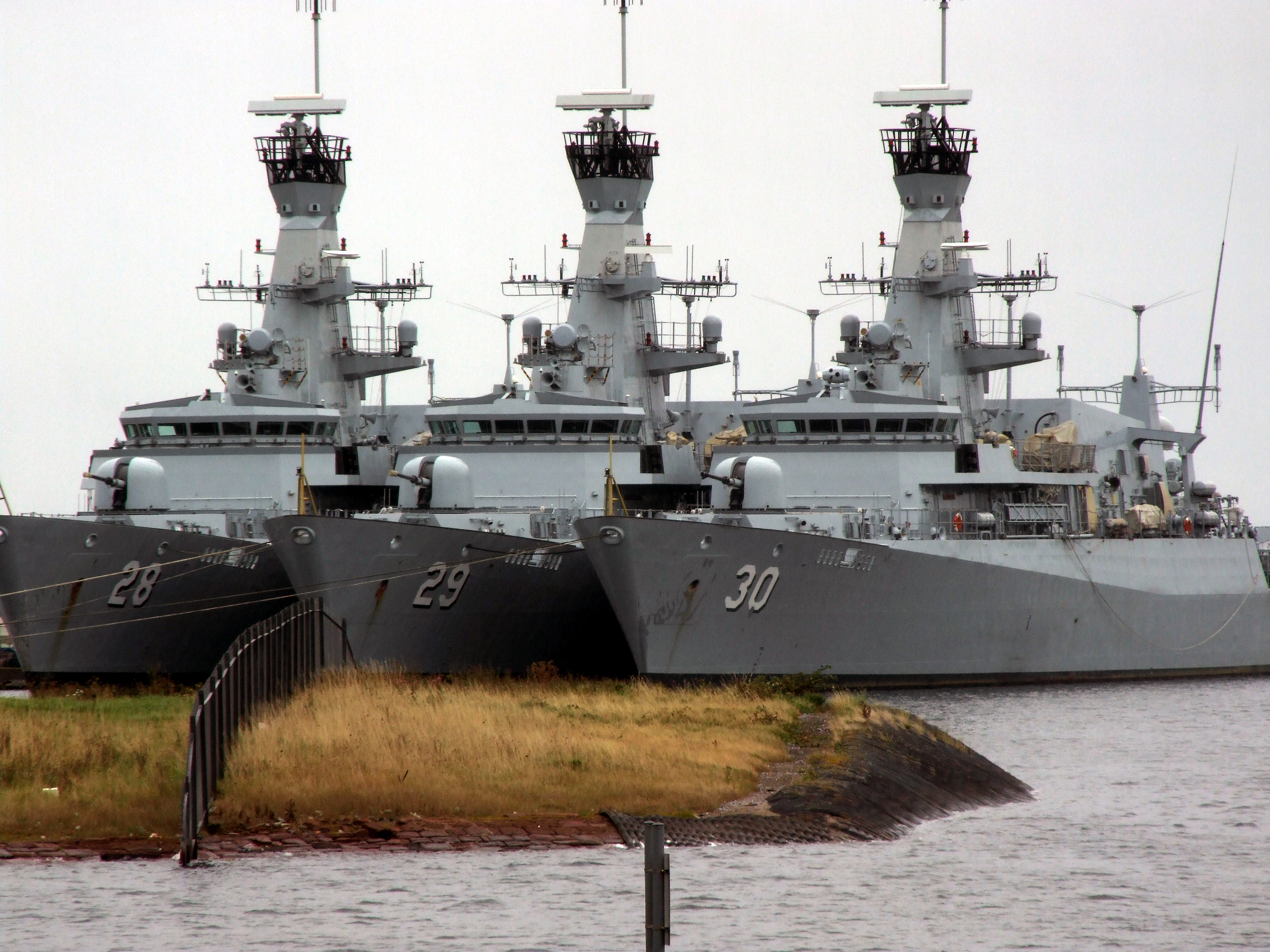
Three Nakhoda Ragam-class corvettes built for the Brunei Navy, but never delivered, berthed at the port of Barrow

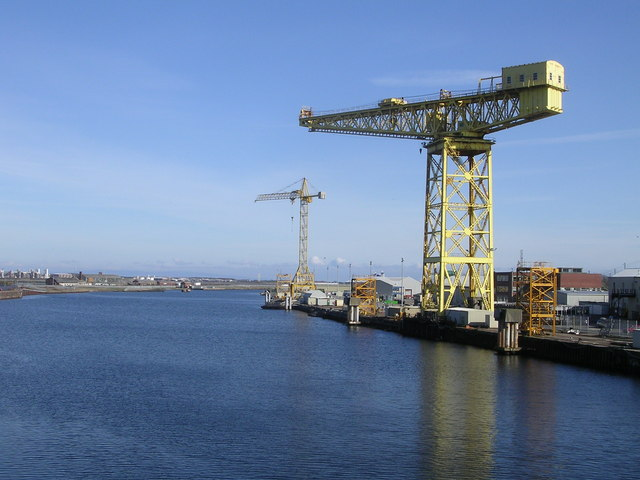
Buccleuch Dock

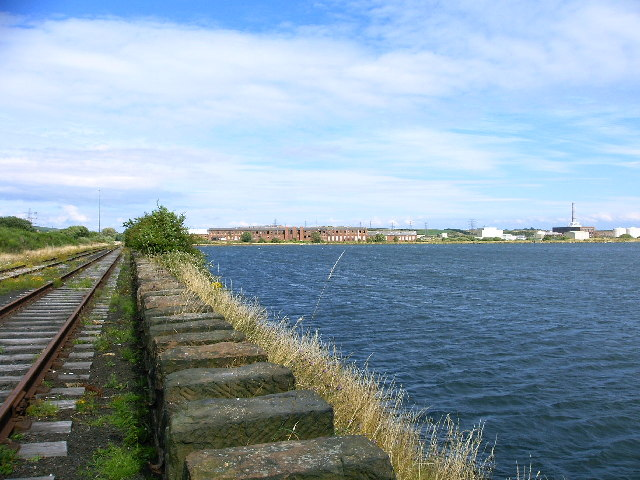
Cavendish Dock

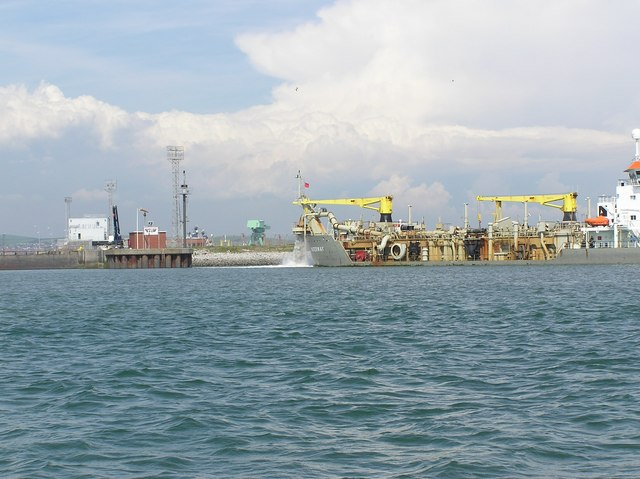
Ramsden Dock

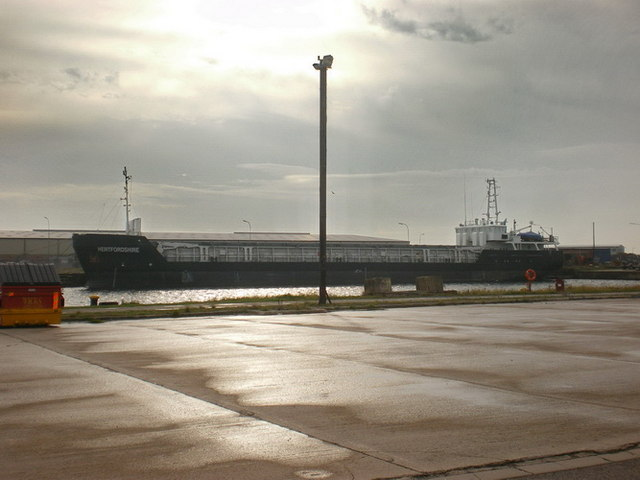
Tanker, Hertfordshire in Anchor Line Basin
Vessels associated with the port

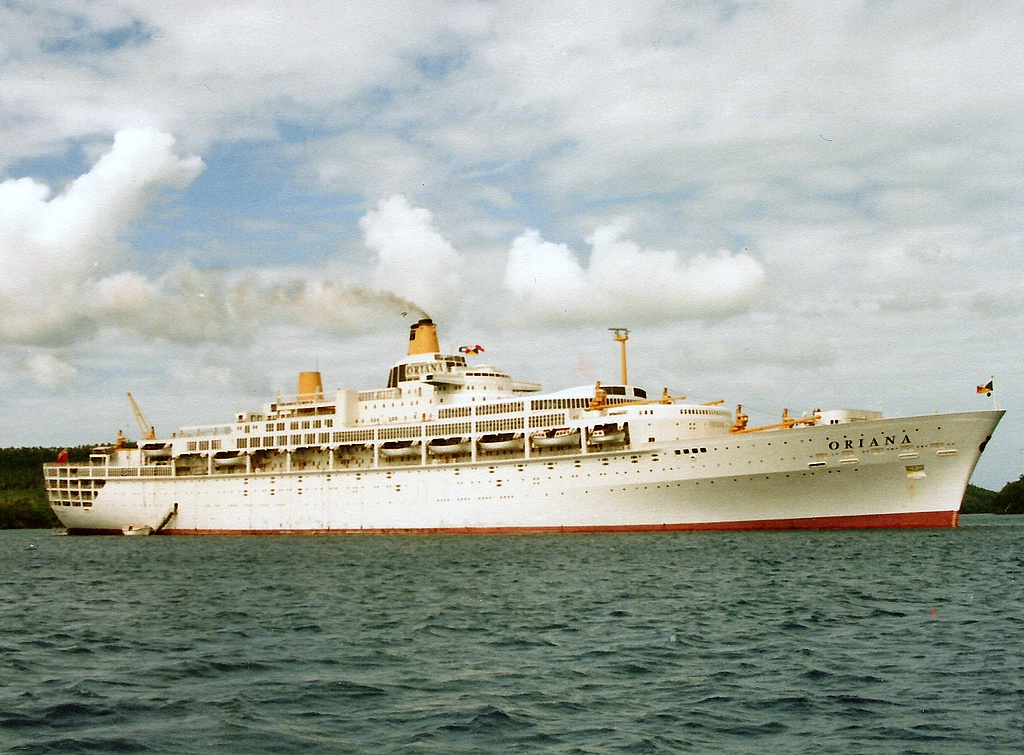
SS Oriana, a Barrow-built ocean liner

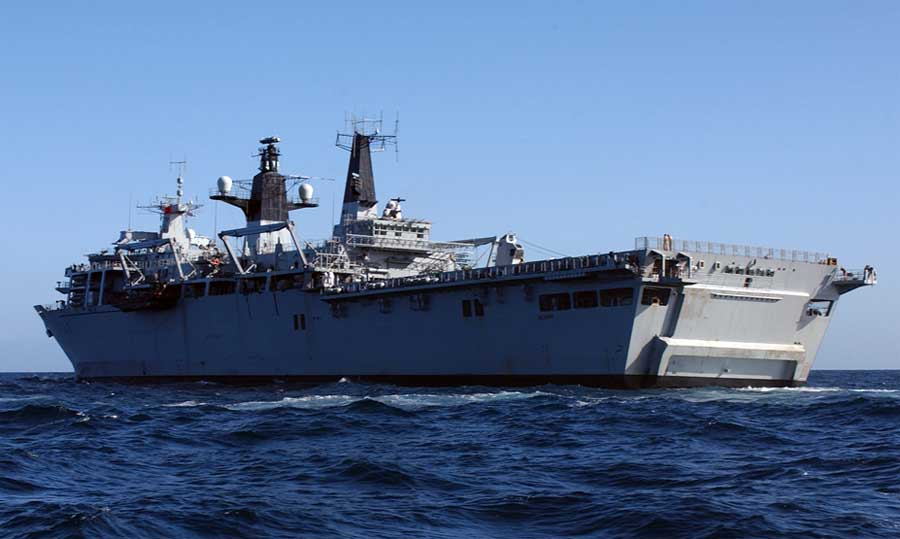
HMS Bulwark, one of the more recent Royal Navy vessels constructed in Barrow

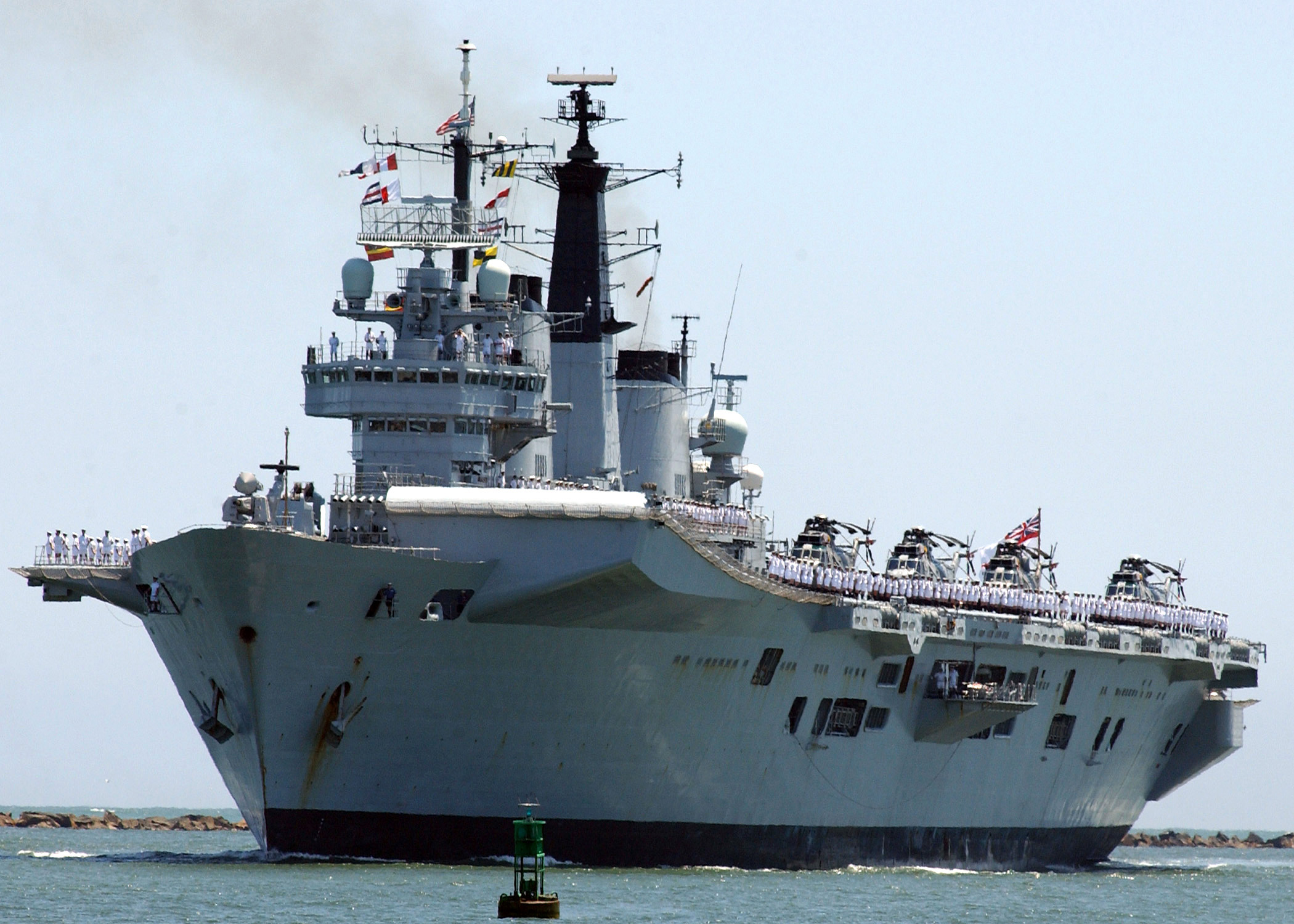
One of the town's most famous ships, HMS Invincible

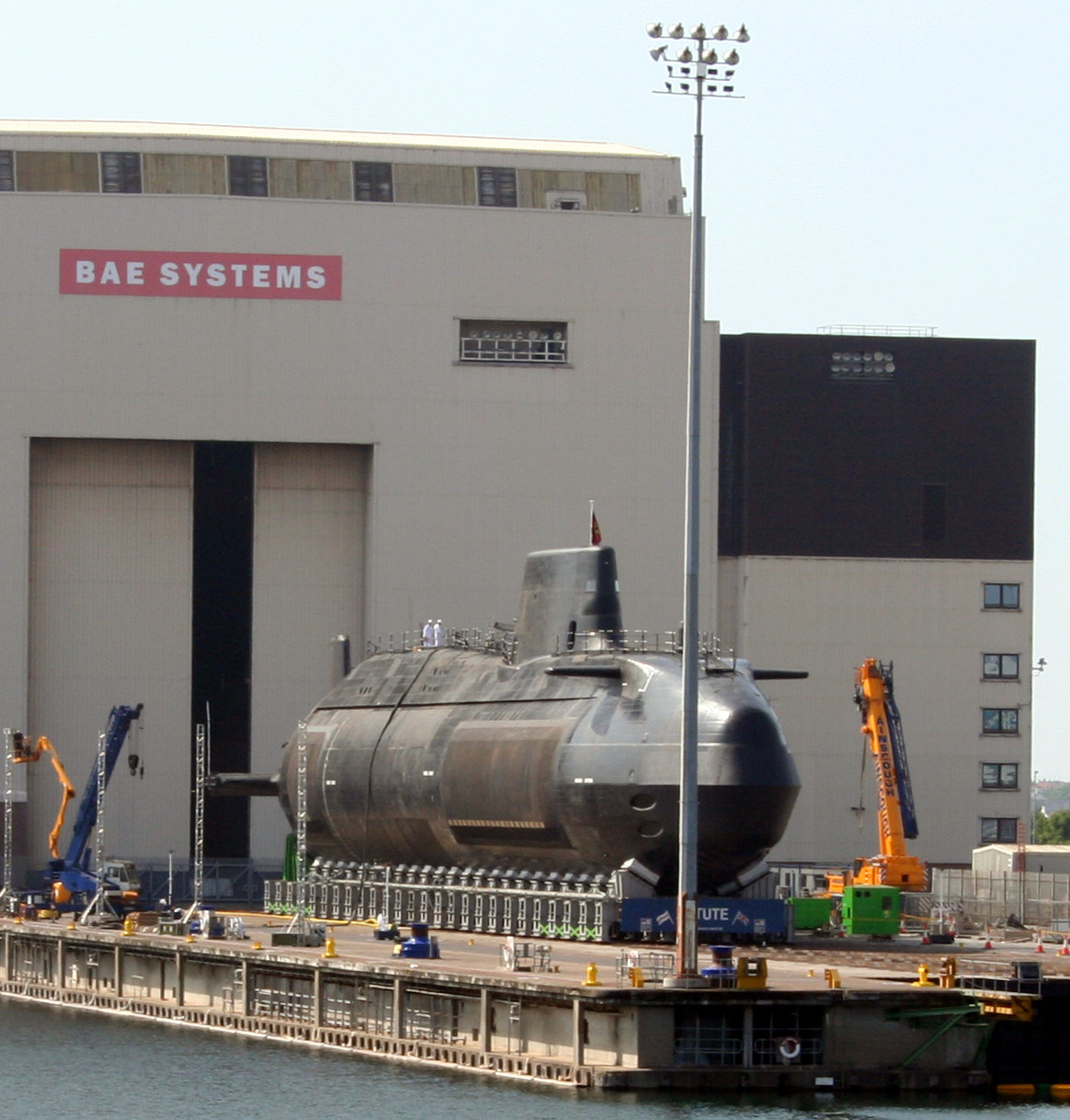
HMS Astute during launch into Devonshire Dock

== See also ==
- The Waterfront Barrow-in-Furness
- Barrow-in-Furness
- List of seaports
- List of ships and submarines built in Barrow-in-Furness

=== Companies associated with the port ===
- Associated British Ports
- James Fisher & Sons
- BAE Systems Submarine Solutions
- Vickers Shipbuilding & Engineering
- Vickers-Armstrongs
- Kimberly-Clark
- FMS
- BNFL / International Nuclear Services
- DONG Energy
- Centrica
