= Devonshire Dock =

Dock in Barrow-in-Furness, England

Coordinates: 54.1087°N 3.2310°W

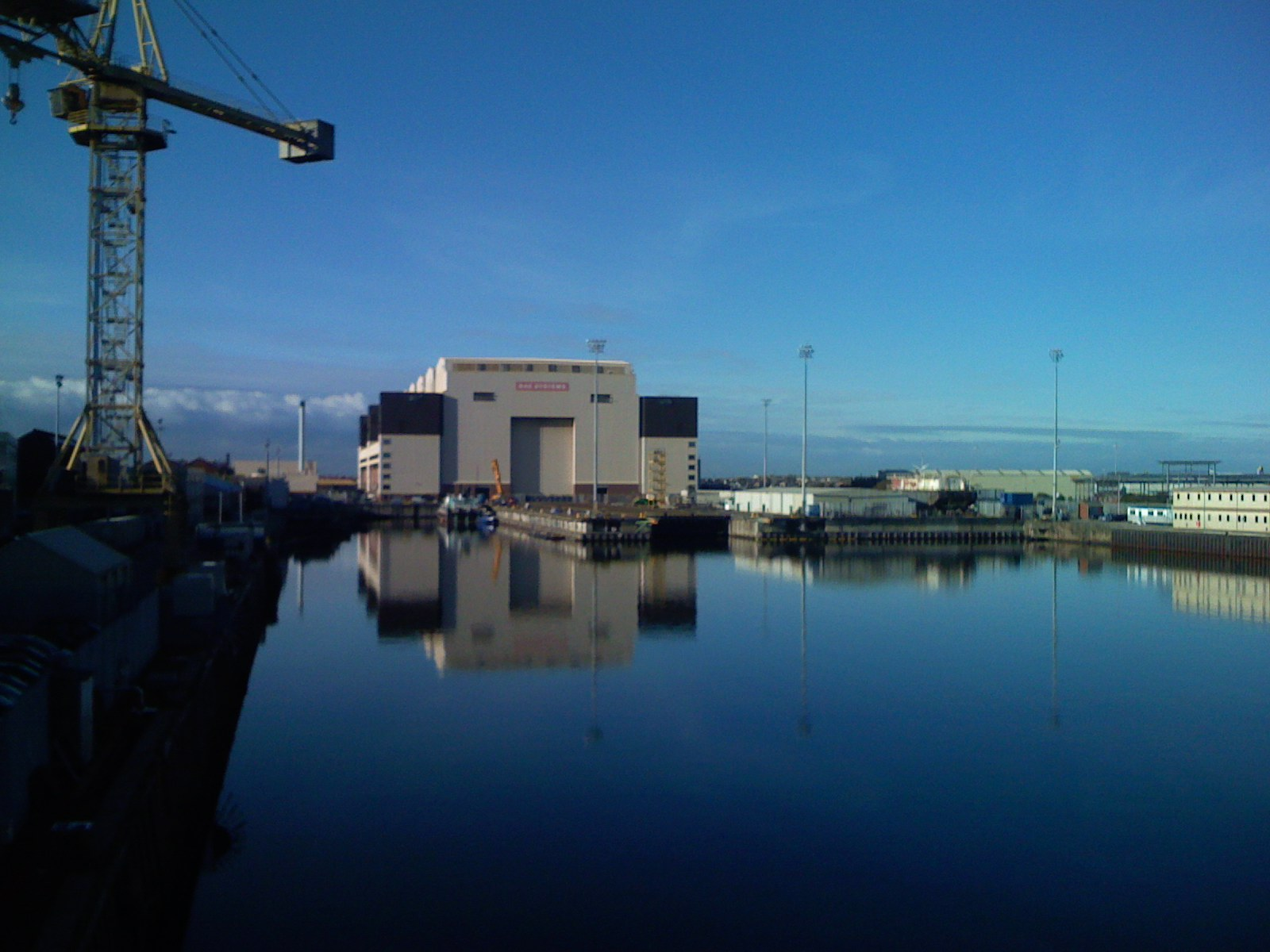
A view across Devonshire Dock from Michaelson Road Bridge

Devonshire Dock is the oldest of the four docks which make up the Royal Port of Barrow in Barrow-in-Furness, England. Although the dock falls under the control of Associated British Ports it is currently solely utilised by BAE Systems. Upon completion of the dock, Prime Minister William Ewart Gladstone stated 'Barrow would one day become another Liverpool'. Although its shipbuilding capabilities have exceeded those on Merseyside, the port and dock system itself never fully met James Ramsden's grand vision for the town.

Construction of Devonshire Dock commenced in 1863 and was funded by the Furness Railway, which at the time controlled the new town's economy (iron ore extraction and transportation). Construction involved reshaping an existing narrow channel between Barrow Island and the British mainland and was completed in 1867, this was followed in 1872 by the adjacent Buccleuch Dock which was built to the same specification allowing vessels up to 200 metres (656 ft) to berth.

A large portion of Devonshire Dock was filled in during the 1980s to create more land for Barrow's growing shipyard. The majority of the land is now occupied by Devonshire Dock Hall a large indoor submarine building complex that has enabled the construction of all Royal Navy Vanguard-class and Astute-class submarines.
