= Michaelson Road Bridge =

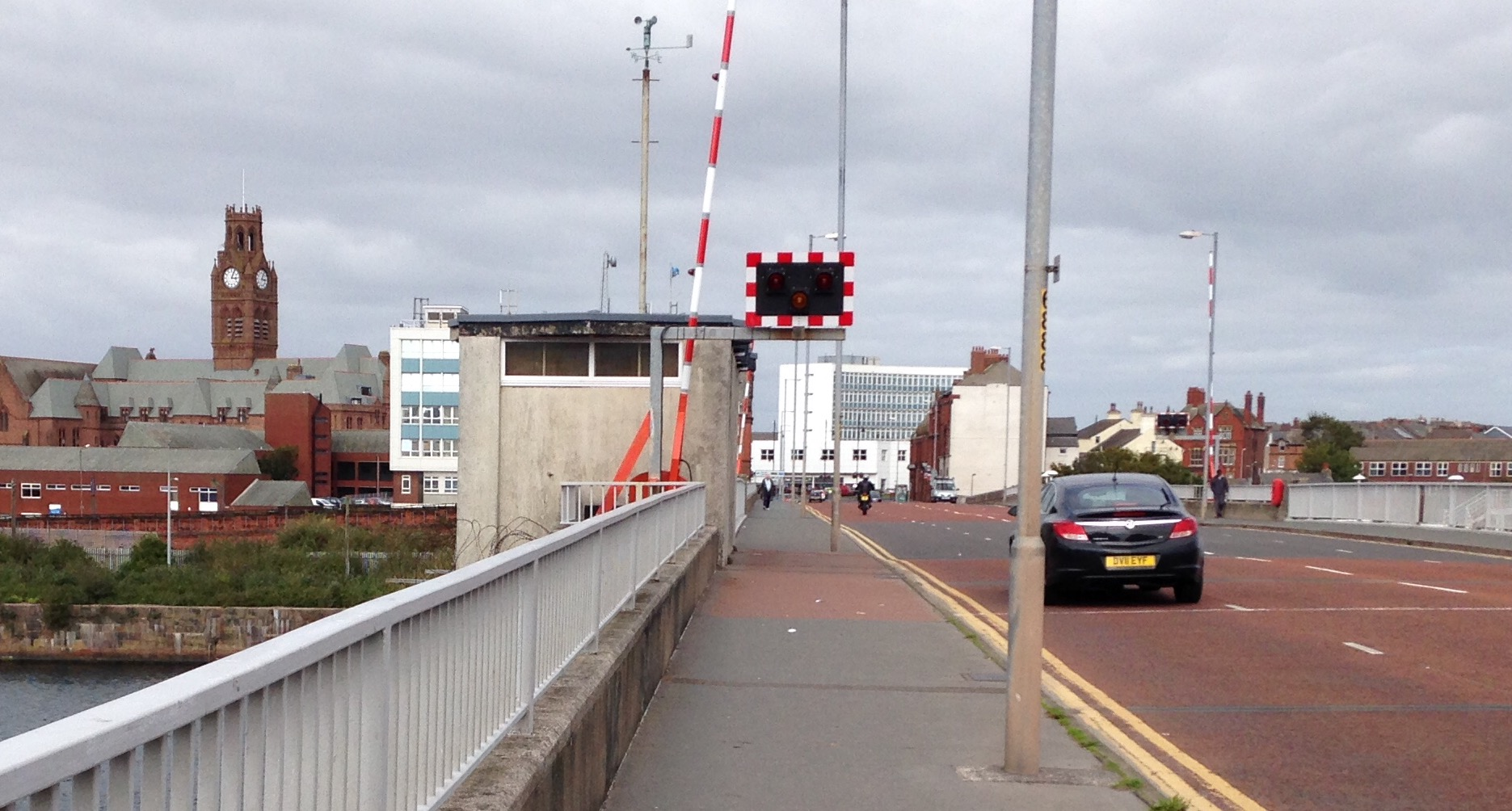
- Michaelson Road Bridge in 2014 looking north
- Coordinates: 54.1082°N 3.2286°W
- Carries: Michaelson Road – motor vehicles, pedestrians
- Crosses: Devonshire and Buccleuch Docks
- Locale: Barrow-in-Furness
- Official name: Michaelson Road Bridge
- Other name(s): Barrow Island Bridge

Characteristics
- Design: Bascule bridge
- Total length: 315 m (1,033 ft)
- Longest span: 112'-6"

History
- Opened: 1884 (Original bridge); 1967 (Current bridge)

Michaelson Road Bridge is a road bridge connecting Central Barrow to Barrow Island in south Cumbria, England. The original high-level bridge was a swing bridge and then replaced by a pair of lift and roll bridges constructed between 1800 and 1884 then superseded by a more modern pair of bascule bridges in the mid-1960s. It was built at a time when Barrow Island was actually an island and there was strong call for road access between mainland Barrow at the shipyard on Barrow Island. Traffic on the bridge was soon relieved when an old Victorian dock was filled in and space was created for the huge Devonshire Dock Hall complex, traffic now runs along the north side of the building on the A590.

Trams formerly operated across the bridge, but now it solely used for vehicles and pedestrians. A second Devonshire Dock footbridge is planned in the multimillion-pound Waterfront Barrow-in-Furness development.

== See also ==
- Barrow-in-Furness
- Barrow Island
- Port of Barrow
