= Northwest Regional Development Agency =

The Northwest Regional Development Agency (NWDA) was the regional development agency for the North West England region and was a non-departmental public body. It was abolished on 31 March 2012.

The Agency was responsible for the economic development and regeneration of the Northwest of England. As a business-led organisation, the NWDA provided a link between the needs of businesses and Government policies. As such, a major responsibility for the Agency was to help create an environment in which businesses in the region could flourish through offering business support, encouraging new start-ups, matching skills provision to employer needs and bringing business investment into the region.

The Agency funded or managed a series of financial support products for businesses in the region.

Geographically, the Agency covered Greater Manchester including Manchester and Salford, Merseyside including Liverpool, Cheshire and Warrington, Cumbria, including the Lake District and Lancashire including Preston. It operated from its main offices in Warrington, with additional offices in Liverpool, Manchester, Preston and Penrith.

The Agency was one of the principal players in the creation of MediaCityUK in Salford Quays, home for a number relocated BBC Departments, as well as a major creative and digital village in its own right. It was also playing a strong role in the development of The Waterfront Barrow-in-Furness.

The NWDA was funded by central Government and responsible to the Department for Business, Innovation and Skills.
