= Dreadnought-class submarine =

Class of British nuclear-powered ballistic missile submarines

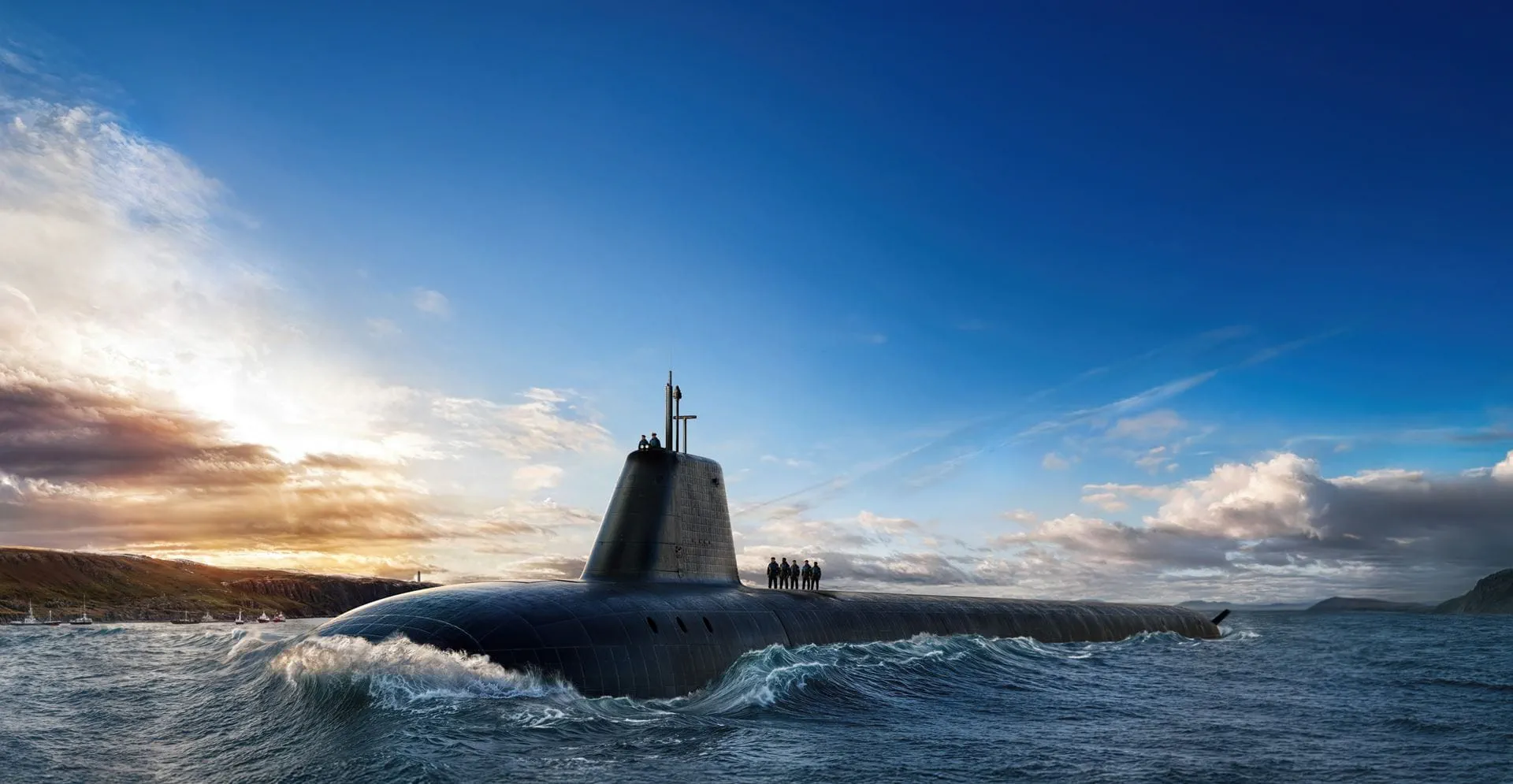
- Artist's rendering of Dreadnought-class submarine

Class overview
- Builders: BAE Systems, Barrow-in-Furness, England
- Operators: Royal Navy
- Preceded by: Vanguard class
- Cost: £31 billion (2016) (equivalent to £40.46 billion in 2024) lifetime cost of total programme (est.); £7.75 billion (2016) (equivalent to £10.12 billion in 2024) per unit (est.)
- Built: First expected by early 2030s
- Planned: 4
- Building: 4
- Active: 0

General characteristics
- Type: Nuclear-powered ballistic missile submarine
- Displacement: 17,200 t (16,900 long tons; 19,000 short tons)
- Length: 153.6 metres (504 ft)
- Propulsion: Rolls-Royce PWR3 nuclear reactor, turbo-electric drive, pump-jet
- Speed: At least 20 knots
- Range: Limited only by food and mechanical components
- Complement: 130
- Armament: 4 × 21 inch (533 mm) torpedo tubes for: Spearfish heavyweight torpedoes; 12 × ballistic missile tubes for: Lockheed Trident II D5 SLBMs

The Dreadnought class is the future replacement for the Royal Navy's Vanguard class of ballistic missile submarines. Like their predecessors, they will carry Trident II D-5 missiles. The Vanguard submarines entered service in the United Kingdom in the 1990s with an intended service life of 25 years. Their replacement is necessary for maintaining a continuous at-sea deterrent (CASD), the principle of operation behind the Trident system.

Provisionally named "Successor" (being the successor to the Vanguard class SSBNs), it was officially announced in 2016 that the first of class would be named Dreadnought, and that the class would be the Dreadnought class. The next three boats will be called Valiant, Warspite and King George VI.

== Background ==
Since the retirement of the last Royal Air Force WE.177 nuclear bomb in 1998, the British nuclear arsenal has been wholly submarine-based. It is intended to deter a potential enemy because they cannot ensure eliminating the entire stockpile in a first strike if a ballistic missile submarine remains undetected. Trident missiles are currently equipped with Holbrook warheads, thought to be technically similar to the American W76. There are plans to replace this with the Astraea A21/Mk7.

Since the Strategic Defence Review (SDR) of 1998, the UK has maintained a stockpile of around 215 warheads, with around 120 active (usable). Under the continuous at sea deterrence policy, at least one Vanguard-class SSBN is kept on patrol with up to 16 Trident missiles sharing up to 48 warheads from the stockpile at any given time. The SDR considered this was the minimum number of warheads adequate for deterrence. It is collectively known as the Trident system. The majority of this system is based in Scotland at HMNB Clyde (HMS Neptune), which includes the Faslane home of the Vanguard submarines, and at RNAD Coulport on Loch Long. The oldest Vanguard-class submarine had been expected to remain in service until 2019 without a refit. Since 1998, the system has also provided the Government with the option of a lower-yield, "sub-strategic" nuclear strike capability. Under both the Strategic Defence and Security Review 2010 and the Strategic Defence and Security Review 2015, the total number of warheads for the submarine on patrol would be 40 and the maximum total number of ballistic missiles would be 8. The 2021 Integrated Review announced, however, along with a lift on the cap on warheads to no more than 260 (from 180 planned in previous reviews), any numbers or information on deployed missiles and warheads will no longer be provided, under a policy of "deliberate ambiguity".

== Decision ==
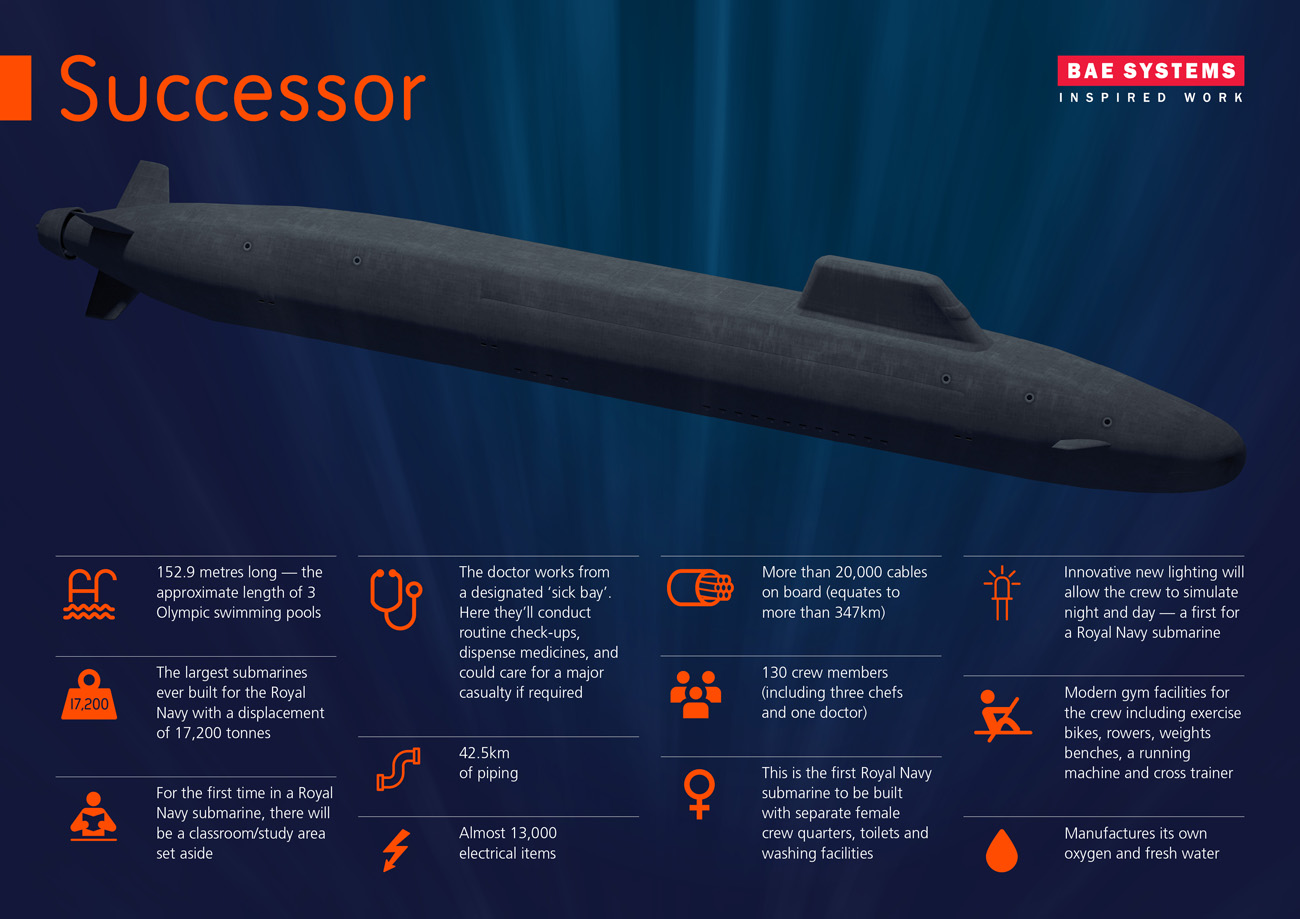
Infographic about the Successor SSBN submarine programme.

In May 2011 the government approved the initial assessment phase for the new submarines and authorised the purchase of long lead-time items including steel for the hulls. In May 2015 the Conservative Party won the UK General Election on a manifesto which included a commitment to maintaining a CASD with four Successor submarines. The final decision to commit to the Successor programme was approved on 18 July 2016 when the House of Commons voted to renew Trident by 472 votes to 117. Successor generated controversy because of its cost, and because some political parties and campaign groups such as the Campaign for Nuclear Disarmament (CND) and Trident Ploughshares oppose the retention of CASD or any nuclear weapons by the UK on moral or financial grounds.

== Cost ==
The programme is managed by a new Submarine Delivery Agency (SDA), established on 3 April 2017 within the Ministry of Defence (MOD) Defence Equipment and Support (DE&S) organisation. BAE Systems and Rolls Royce are the programme's Tier One industrial partners.

In 2011, the programme's Initial Gate report estimated costs at £25 billion. In 2015, the programme was estimated to cost £31 billion including estimated future defence inflation, design, testing and construction of the US-UK Common Missile Compartment and modernisation of shipyard facilities in Barrow, with £10 billion of additional contingency set aside. In March 2023, £2 billion of the contingency fund had been accessed to reprofile spending and bring construction forward. These costs do not include the related Trident missile renewal, new infrastructure projects at the re-nationalised Atomic Weapons Establishment, and new nuclear fuel production facilities at Rolls-Royce.

Once in service, annual in-service costs are expected to be approximately 6% of the defence budget (about £3 billion).

Studies by the Nuclear Information Service and the Campaign for Nuclear Disarmament have suggested that the MOD cost presentation is under-estimating replacement programme costs. Including all related costs, including new infrastructure investment and decommissioning costs, and 30 years of in-service costs, they estimate a cost in the region of £172 to £205 billion. Crispin Blunt, Chair of the Foreign Affairs Select Committee, estimated in July 2016 that the renewed deterrent lifetime cost would be £179 billion.

A January 2018, the National Audit Office expressed concern about the programme's spending profile, including that it was "unaffordable in the early years of the project" within the MOD allocated budget. Subsequently the MOD moved £300 million into the Dreadnought programme from elsewhere, and later the 2018 budget added £1 billion to the defence budget, 40% of which went to the Dreadnought programme. The 2020 Spending Review allocated an extra £16.5 billion to the defence budget over 2020 to 2025, in part to "continue the renewal of the UK's nuclear deterrent".

In 2026, a new phase of contracts was let worth £8.4 billion, part of a reported programme cost of £31 billion.

== Design ==
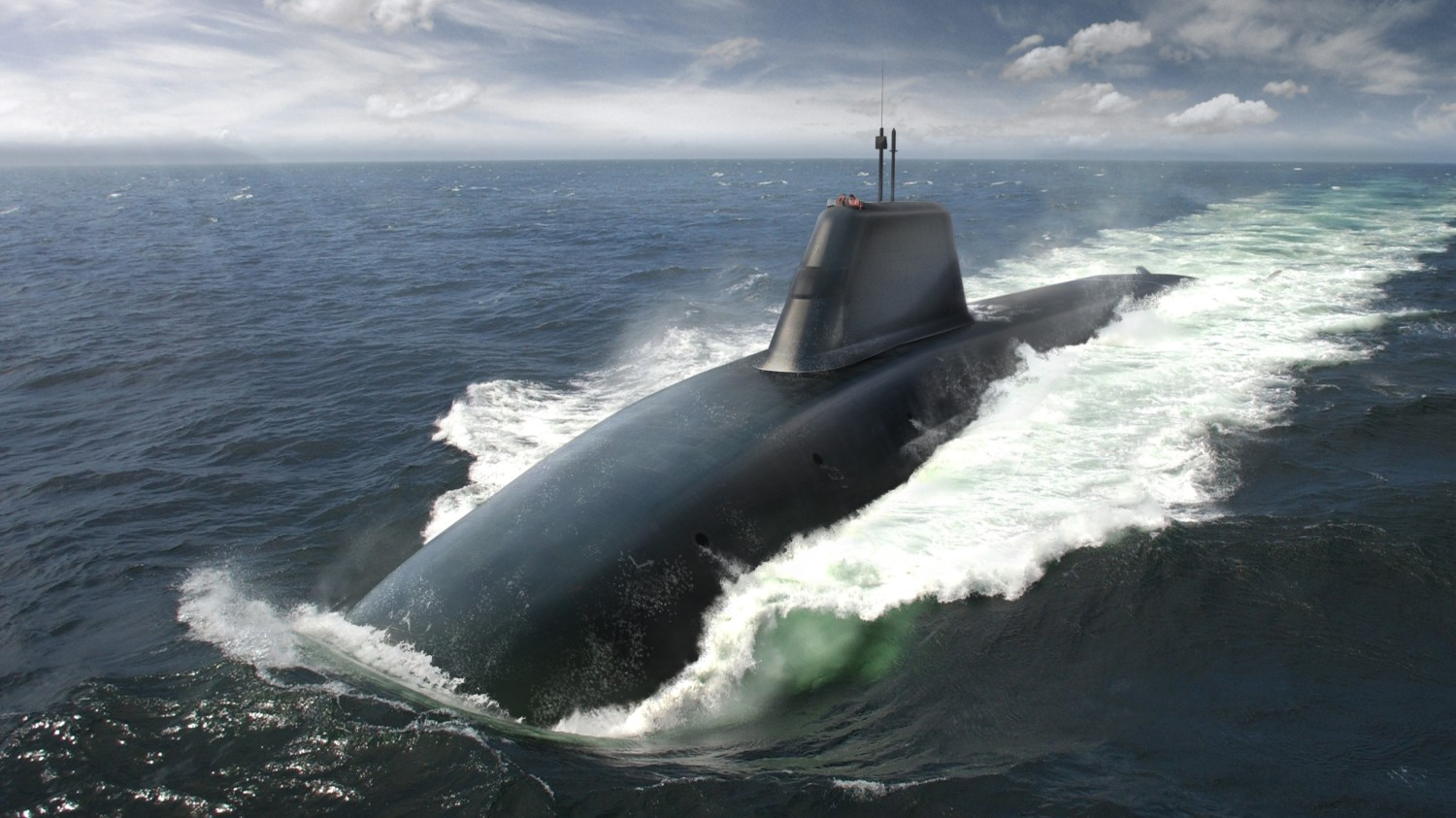
Rendering of Dreadnought-class submarine, 2021

The submarines have an intended service life of around 35 to 40 years, an increase of around 50% over the previous class. The submarines will each have a crew of 130, including three chefs and a doctor. There will be separate female quarters, a gym space, classroom and a lighting system simulating the time of day on board.

They will be powered by Rolls-Royce's PWR3 (Pressurised Water Reactor 3), compared to the PWR2 used on Vanguard- and Astute-class submarines. Although PWR2 and PWR2b (a derivative with improvements) designs were considered, the PWR3 was chosen for improved safety, easier operations, a longer service life and reduced maintenance costs, with 30% fewer parts. They will be equipped with X-rudders, in a first on British submarines, to reduce noise, especially at high speeds, in front of the pump-jet. The submarines will have a maximum speed of at least 20 knots.

Unlike Vanguard-class submarines, control of movement will use "fly-by-wire" technology, with the Active Vehicle Control Management (AVCM) system from BAE Systems. As in Astute-class and Trafalgar-class submarines, they will be equipped with the Sonar 2076 system from Thales.

They will each have three missile compartments with four missile tubes each (quad packs), for a total of twelve missile tubes. These share a common design with those on American Columbia-class submarine, as part of the "Common Missile Compartment" (CMC) scheme. There will be five deck levels.

== Construction ==
Construction started in late 2016 at the Barrow-in-Furness shipyard operated by BAE Systems Submarines, when the first submarine was provisionally expected to enter service in 2028. The start of construction of the second phase was announced in May 2018. The construction phase of the submarines is expected to last 20 years. The boats are being constructed in 16 "units", later grouped into 3 "mega units", before assembly in the Devonshire Dock Hall.

In October 2018, Cammell Laird was awarded a contract to manufacture 29 non-pressure hull sections in Birkenhead. The MOD said in December 2018 that construction of the first submarine was on schedule and within budget. In April 2021, The Sunday Times reported that delays on the Astute-class submarines may impact the Dreadnought class, which will be built in the same dock hall. Related concerns are a 19-month delay to an extension of the Barrow facility and a five-year delay to a Rolls-Royce factory which will build the nuclear reactors. However, the MOD commented that "the Dreadnought programme remains on track to deliver to schedule, with the first in class expected to enter service in the early 2030s."

Thales Glasgow was awarded a £193 million contract in July 2023, to provide optronic masts, similar to those in use on Astute class. General Dynamics Mission Systems is to provide and maintain fire control systems for both Dreadnought- and American Columbia-class submarines. Seventy-five missile tube assemblies for Dreadnought- and Columbia-class submarines will be manufactured by Babcock in Rosyth and Bristol. Northrop Grumman will provide the launcher subsystem hardware for the common missile compartments in both platforms, under a $458 million contract in June 2022. In January 2025, Rolls Royce was awarded a £9 billion contract by the MOD, covering research, design, manufacture and support of all nuclear reactors in Royal Navy submarines. The contract, named "Unity", covers a period of 8 years, and will continue to support the delivery of the reactors for Dreadnought-class submarines. Defence Secretary at the time John Healey said "This investment in Britain’s defence will deliver a long-term boost to British business, jobs and national security."

== Submarines of the class ==
Name	Builder	Steel cut	Laid Down	Launched	Commissioned	Status
Dreadnought	BAE Systems Submarines, Barrow-in-Furness	6 October 2016	20 March 2025		Expected early 2030s	Under construction
Valiant	BAE Systems Submarines, Barrow-in-Furness	September 2019				Under construction
Warspite	BAE Systems Submarines, Barrow-in-Furness	9 February 2023				Under construction
King George VI	BAE Systems Submarines, Barrow-in-Furness	22 September 2025				Under construction

== See also ==
- Future of the Royal Navy
- List of submarine classes of the Royal Navy
- Nuclear weapons and the United Kingdom
- Royal Navy Submarine Service
- United Kingdom and weapons of mass destruction
