= Barrow-in-Furness Tramways Company =

Closed tramway in England

Operation
- Locale: Barrow-in-Furness
- Open: 11 July 1885
- Close: 5 April 1932
- Status: Closed

Infrastructure
- Track gauge: 4 ft (1,219 mm)
- Propulsion system: Steam then Electric

Statistics
- Route length: 6.39 miles (10.28 km)

The Barrow-in-Furness Tramways Company operated a tramway service in Barrow-in-Furness between 1885 and 1932.

== History ==
The Barrow-in-Furness Tramways Company was owned by Barrow-in-Furness Corporation. It started steam operated tramway services on 11 July 1885, with eight steam locomotives from Kitson and Company and eight trailers from the Falcon Works.

On 23 December 1899, it was taken over by British Electric Traction who proceeded to modernise and electrify the system. The first electric service ran on 6 February 1904.

Barrow-in-Furness Corporation took over operation of the service on 1 January 1920 at a cost of £96,250 (equivalent to £3,719,447 in 2025). Technological advancements in the form of petrol and diesel powered buses resulted in the closure of the tramway, with the last service running on 5 April 1932.

== Network map ==
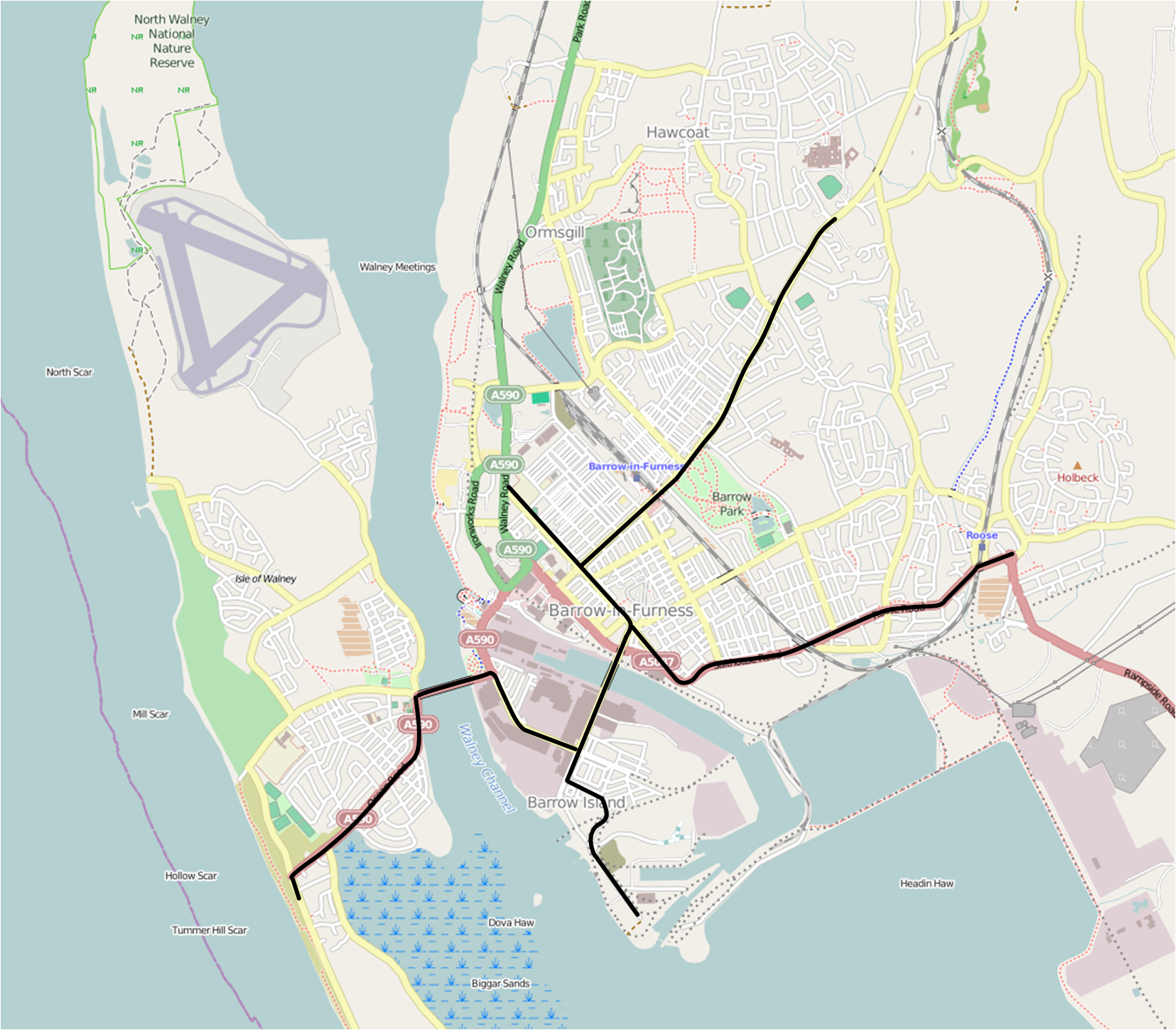
