= BAE Systems Submarines =

Submarine manufacturing company

Coordinates: 54°06′36″N 3°14′11″W

- Type: Private
- Industry: Defence; Shipbuilding; Marine engineering
- Founded: March 2003
- Headquarters: Barrow-in-Furness, England
- Key people: Steve Timms (Managing Director)
- Products: Submarines
- Services: Submarine design Submarine support
- Number of employees: Approximately 9,000
- Parent: BAE Systems
- Website: www.baesystems.com

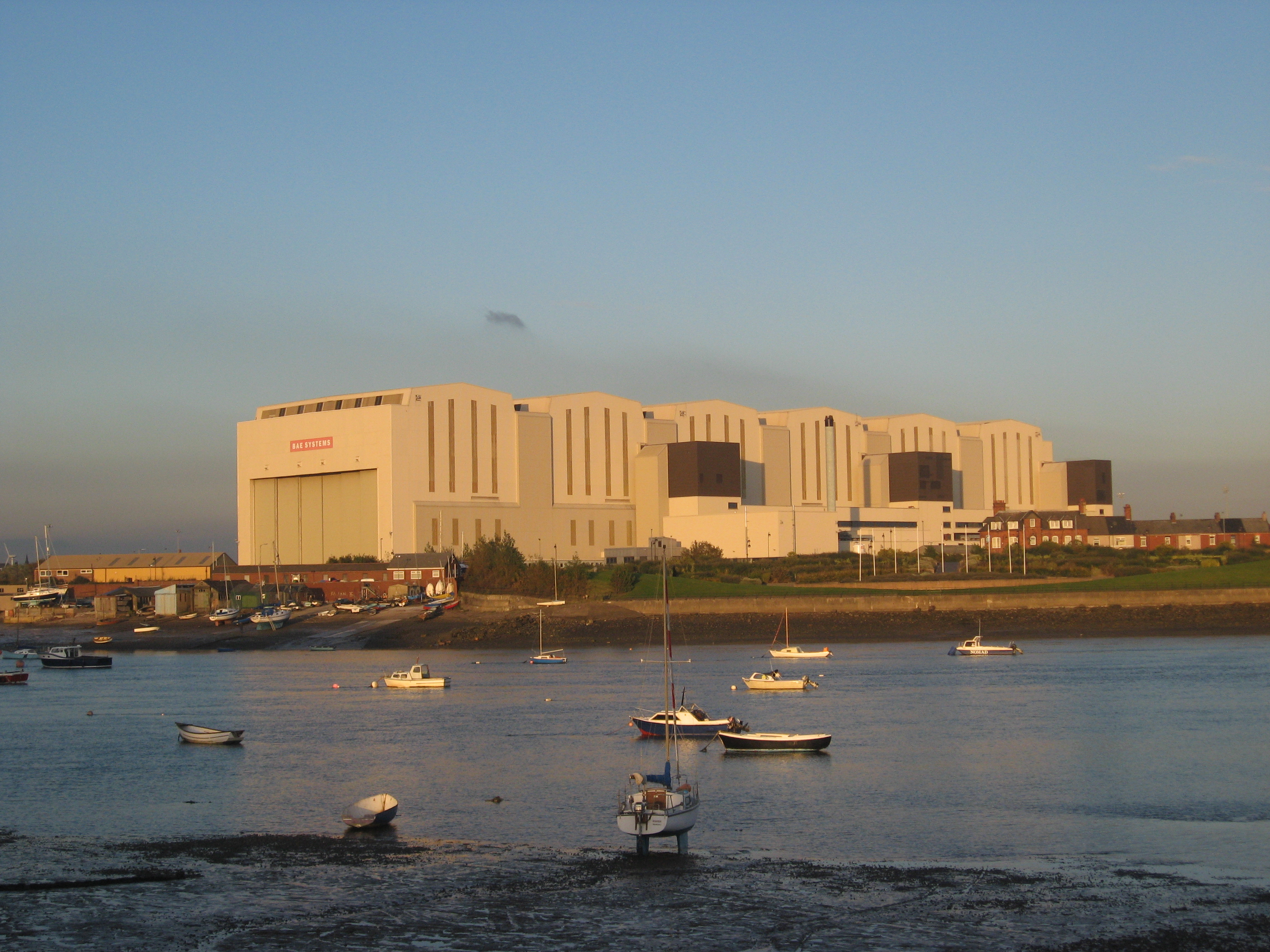
BAE Systems Submarines' 25,000m² Devonshire Dock Hall indoor shipbuilding complex, the largest of its kind in Europe.

BAE Systems Submarines, (Note: BAE Systems Submarine Solutions was split out from BAE Systems Marine and operated as such until January 2012. It was named BAE Systems Maritime - Submarines until 2017 before it became BAE Systems Submarines.) is a wholly owned subsidiary of BAE Systems, based in Barrow-in-Furness, Cumbria, England, and is responsible for the development and production of submarines.

BAE Systems Submarines operates one of the few shipyards in the world capable of designing and building nuclear submarines, which has constructed all but three of the Royal Navy's nuclear-powered submarines since the commissioning of HMS Dreadnought in 1963. The exceptions were HMS Conqueror, HMS Renown and HMS Revenge, which were built by Cammell Laird.

== History ==
The Barrow-in-Furness shipyard has been building submarines since Abdül Hamid was launched for the Ottoman Navy in 1886 and the Holland-class submarines for the Royal Navy were launched in 1901. The shipyard was formerly operated by Vickers Shipbuilding and Engineering (VSEL). Upon the creation of BAE Systems in 1999, the submarine division became part of BAE Systems Marine. As part of BAE Systems Marine, the yard constructed surface ships, such as the Albion-class landing platform docks. In 2003, the company was split into BAE Systems Submarines and BAE Systems Naval Ships, with Barrow ceasing surface ship construction. Following a 2012 restructuring, BAE Systems Submarines became part of BAE Systems Maritime & Land UK, alongside BAE Systems Maritime Services and BAE Systems Naval Ships.

Since its completion in 1986, submarines at Barrow are constructed inside the Devonshire Dock Hall (DDH). In addition to the main shipyard in Barrow-in-Furness, BAE Systems Submarines also operates from sites at Farnborough, Ash Vale, Frimley and Weymouth.

The company is currently constructing the Astute-class submarines, a new generation nuclear attack submarine (SSN) for the Royal Navy, the first of which was launched on 8 June 2007. The order for the initial batch of three submarines was placed in 1997, with Marconi Marine (VSEL), which was absorbed into BAE Systems in 1999. Construction of the final Astute-class began in May 2018 and all seven Astute boats are scheduled to be completed by the end of 2026. BAE Systems Submarines is also building four Dreadnought-class submarine ballistic missile submarines, which will carry the UK's Strategic Nuclear Deterrent. Construction started in late 2016 and the first submarine is expected to enter service in the early 2030s.

A "significant fire" at the Barrow-in-Furness facility in October 2024 left two people hospitalised for smoke inhalation, but Cumbria Constabulary stated that there was no nuclear risk.

== See also ==
- Defence Nuclear Enterprise
- Port of Barrow
- List of ships and submarines built in Barrow-in-Furness
