= Devonshire Dock Hall =

Shipbuilding facility in Barrow-in-Furness, England

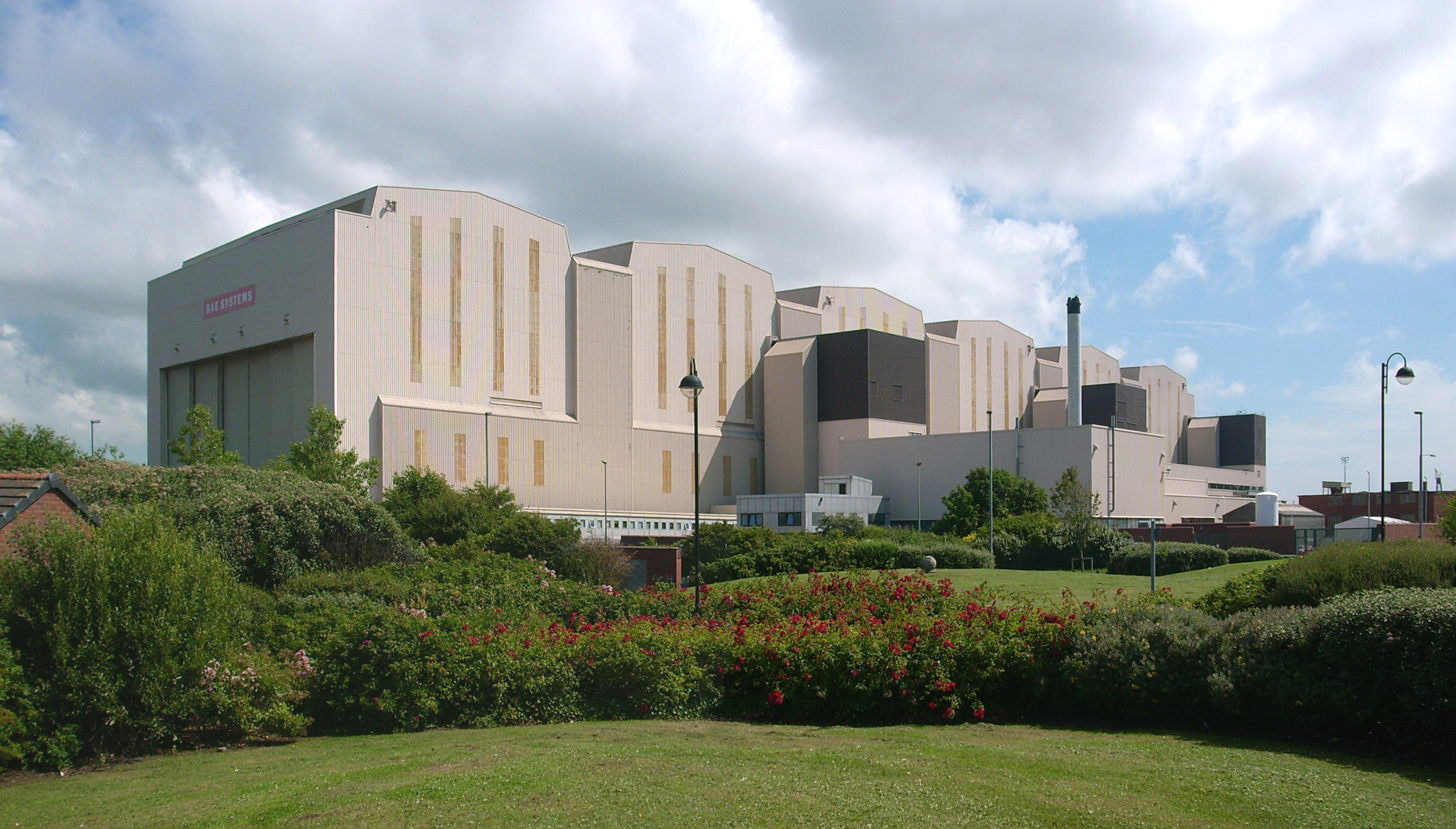
- Devonshire Dock Hall viewed from Channelside Haven in 2010
- Interactive map of the Devonshire Dock Hall area

General information
- Type: Shipbuilding hall
- Location: Barrow-in-Furness, England, United Kingdom
- Coordinates: 54.1104°N 3.2374°W
- Construction started: 1982
- Completed: 1986
- Owner: BAE Systems Maritime – Submarines

Technical details
- Structural system: Steel frame
- Floor area: 35,000 square metres (380,000 sq ft)

Design and construction
- Architects: Civil design by RT James and Partners, London and Newcastle-upon-Tyne
- Main contractor: Alfred McAlpine

Devonshire Dock Hall (DDH) is a large indoor shipbuilding and assembly complex that forms part of the BAE Systems shipyard in the Barrow Island area of Barrow-in-Furness, Cumbria, England.

== History ==
Constructed between 1982 and 1986 by Alfred McAlpine plc for Vickers Shipbuilding and Engineering, DDH was built on land that was created by infilling part of Devonshire Dock with 2.4 million tonnes of sand pumped from nearby Roosecote Sands. The purpose of the indoor shipbuilding facility was to protect vessels from external weather conditions and prevent satellites from photographing secret technologies involved. DDH provides a controlled environment for ship and submarine assembly, and avoids the difficulties caused by building on the slope of traditional slipways. Outside the hall, a 24,300-tonne capacity shiplift allows completed vessels to be lowered into the water independently of the tide. Vessels can also be lifted out of the water and transferred to the hall. The shiplift was the largest in the world upon completion. The first use of the DDH was for construction of HMS Triumph, followed by the Vanguard-class submarines nuclear-powered ballistic missile submarines (SSBNs) (Vanguard, Victorious, Vigilant and Vengeance). The shipyard is currently constructing the Astute-class submarines the first of which HMS Astute was launched in 2007 and the Dreadnought-class, the replacement for the Vanguard-class of SSBN submarines.

At 00:44 GMT on 30 October 2024, emergency services were called to a "significant fire" at the facility. Two people were taken to hospital for suspected smoke inhalation, but were later released. BAE Systems stated that all personnel were "accounted for" and that non-essential staff should not come to work that day and should work from home. Cumbria Police said there was "no nuclear risk". 15 fire appliances were sent to the scene by Cumbria Fire and Rescue Service.

== Structure and dimensions ==
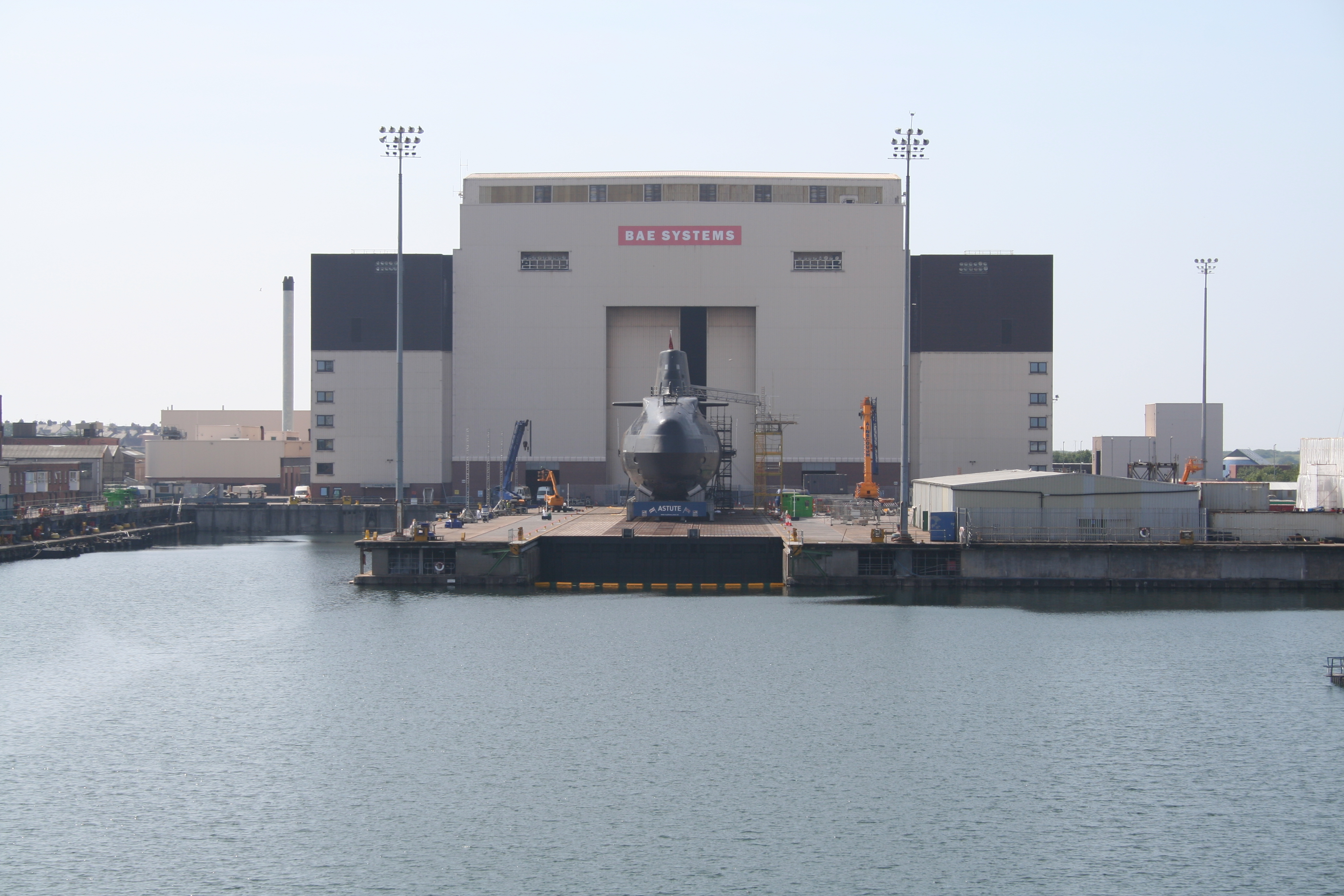
HMS Astute photographed outside DDH in 2007

The steel frame DDH is the tallest building in Barrow at 51 metres (167 ft) and can be readily described as a 'Groundscraper' having an internal working length of 260 m (850 ft), width of 58 m (190 ft) and an area of 25,000 square metres (270,000 sq ft) - over 6 acres. DDH was extended in the late 2010s which added an additional 10,365 square metres (111,570 sq ft) of floor area thus totalling over 35,000 square metres (380,000 sq ft).

It is visible from miles around, most notably from the Blackpool Promenade which is over 20 miles away.

== Future expansion ==
DDH is at the centre of a £300 million redevelopment of the shipyard that commenced in late 2014. A large extension to the hall is under-construction to enable construction of the Dreadnought-class submarines, the replacement for the Vanguard-class SSBNs. Proposals were also put forward in 2019 to re-clad the DDH in its entirety to extend the lifetime of the building. The projects are the largest investment at the shipyard since the construction of DDH itself.

== See also ==
- Vickers Shipbuilding and Engineering
- BAE Systems Maritime – Submarines
- UK Trident programme

== Sources ==
- Gray, Tony (1987). The Road to Success: Alfred McAlpine 1935 - 1985. Rainbird Publishing.
