= Vickers Shipbuilding and Engineering =

British shipbuilding company

Vickers Shipbuilding & Engineering Limited (VSEL)
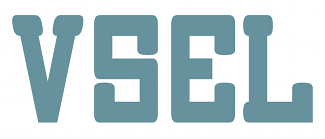
- Type: Limited company
- Industry: Shipbuilding; Marine Engineering
- Founded: 1871
- Defunct: 2007
- Fate: Acquired
- Successor: BAE Systems Submarine Solutions; BAE Systems Land & Armaments
- Headquarters: Barrow-in-Furness, England
- Parent: British Shipbuilders (1977–1986); GEC (1995–1999); BAE Systems (1999–present)

Vickers Shipbuilding and Engineering Limited (VSEL) was a shipbuilding company based at Barrow-in-Furness, England that built warships, civilian ships, submarines and armaments. The company was historically the Naval Construction Works of Vickers Armstrongs and has a heritage of building large naval warships and armaments. Through a complicated history the company's shipbuilding division is now BAE Systems Submarine Solutions and the armaments division is now part of BAE Systems Land & Armaments.

== History ==
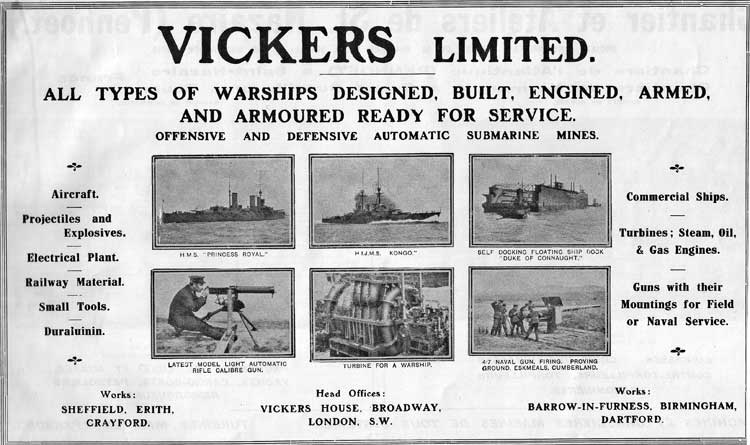
A Vickers advert from 1914

The company was founded in 1871 by James Ramsden as the Iron Shipbuilding Company, but its name was soon changed to Barrow Shipbuilding Company.

In 1897, Vickers & Sons bought the Barrow Shipbuilding Company and its subsidiary the Maxim Nordenfelt Guns and Ammunition Company, becoming Vickers, Sons and Maxim Limited. The shipyard at Barrow became the Naval Construction & Armaments Company. In 1911 the company was renamed Vickers Limited, and in 1927 became Vickers Armstrongs Limited after a merger with Armstrong Whitworth, whose shipyard at High Walker on the River Tyne became the "Naval Yard".

In 1955 the name of the shipbuilding division changed to Vickers Armstrongs Shipbuilders, Ltd and changed again in 1968 to Vickers Limited Shipbuilding Group.

The shipbuilding group was nationalised under the Aircraft and Shipbuilding Industries Act in 1977 and subsumed into British Shipbuilders.

The ex-Vickers yard at Barrow was the first shipyard of the British Shipbuilders group to return to the private sector. It was sold in March 1986 to an employee-led company, VSEL Consortium, which also included its Birkenhead-based subsidiary, Cammell Laird. The company was floated on the London Stock Exchange in December 1986.

Map showing the location of VSEL within Cumbria

In 1988, a mistake by senior management and changing shipbuilding methods meant that the Vickers shipyard in Barrow-in-Furness accidentally welded part of HMS Triumph (a nuclear submarine) in an upside-down position.

In 1994 VSEL was subject to two takeover proposals, one from GEC and another from British Aerospace (BAe). VSEL was willing to participate in a merger with a larger company to reduce its exposure to cycles in warship production, particularly following the Options for Change defence review after the end of the Cold War. Both bids were referred to the Monopolies & Mergers Commission (MMC) which issued its conclusions and advice to government in May 1995. BAe's bid was approved, while the MMC concluded (with two of six members dissenting) that GEC's bid was likely to "operate against the public interest". However it was GEC's bid that was approved and accepted by VSEL, since Secretary of State Michael Heseltine did not accept the MMC's recommendation and allowed the bid to proceed.

Following GEC's purchase VSEL became Marconi Marine (VSEL), part of the company's GEC-Marconi division. With the merger of British Aerospace and GEC's defence business – Marconi Electronic Systems – VSEL passed to the resulting company, BAE Systems as part of BAE Systems Marine. In 2003 it became an independent division known as BAE Systems Submarines after BAE systems split its ship and submarine building operations. This was renamed BAE Systems Submarine Solutions in January 2007.

== See also ==
- Royal Port of Barrow
- Vickerstown
