= Dutch =

Dutch commonly refers to:

- Something of, from, or related to the Netherlands or the Kingdom of the Netherlands
  - Dutch people
  - Dutch language

Dutch may also refer to:

== Places in the United States ==
- Dutch, West Virginia, an unincorporated community
- Dutch Harbor, Alaska, also known as simply Dutch, a harbor
- Dutch Island (Rhode Island), an island in Narragansett Bay
- Dutch Hill (Herkimer County, New York), a summit

== People ==
- Dutch (nickname), a list of people
- Johnny Dutch (born 1989), American hurdler
- Dutch Sheets (born 1954), American author and pastor
- Dutch (wrestler), ring name of American professional wrestler William Carr (born 1987)
- Dutch Mantel, ring name of American retired professional wrestler Wayne Maurice Keown (born 1949)
- Dutch Savage, ring name of professional wrestler and promoter Frank Stewart (1935–2013)

== Arts, entertainment, and media ==
=== Fictional characters ===
- Dutch (Black Lagoon), an African-American character from the Japanese manga and anime Black Lagoon
- Dutch Schaefer, the protagonist of the 1987 film Predator played by Arnold Schwarzenegger
- Dutch van der Linde, a central character from the Red Dead video games
- Dutch Wagenbach, on the TV series The Shield

=== Other uses in arts, entertainment, and media ===
- Dutch (1991 film), an American comedy film starring Ed O'Neill
- Dutch (2021 film), an American romantic crime drama film
- Dutch: A Memoir of Ronald Reagan, a 1999 biography with fictional elements by Edmund Morris
- Dutch, the magazine, an English-language magazine about the Netherlands and the Dutch
- Dutching, a gambling term that signifies betting on more than one outcome
- Dutch, an American trip-hop duo that released the 2010 album A Bright Cold Day
- Dutch, Cockney slang for wife, as in the song "My Old Dutch"

== Chess ==
- Bird's Opening, a chess opening also known as the "Dutch attack"
- Dutch Defence, a chess opening

== Sports and mascots ==
- Dutch Grand Prix, a Formula One car race
- Dutch Open (disambiguation)
- Dutch TT, a motorcycle race, part of the MotoGP World Championship
- Dutch International, an open international badminton tournament held in the Netherlands
- The athletic teams of Central College (Iowa), nicknamed the Dutch
- Dutch, mascot of the Union Dutchmen, the athletic teams of Union College

== Other uses ==
- Dutch (company), an American veterinary telehealth company

== See also ==
- Deutsch (disambiguation)
- Dutch Fort, a fort on Pangkor Island, Manjung District, Perak, Malaysia
- Double Dutch (disambiguation)
- Dutch Boy (disambiguation)
- Dutch Hill (disambiguation)
- Dutch oven (disambiguation)
- Dutchy (disambiguation)
- Going Dutch or Dutch treat, an arrangement whereby each person in a group pays for themselves
