= Deutschland (disambiguation) =

Deutschland is the German-language word, or endonym, for Germany.

Deutschland may also refer to:

== Ships ==
- SS Deutschland, the name of several steamships
- SMS Deutschland, the name of ships of the German Empire's Kaiserliche Marine
- Deutschland-class battleship, built for the German Kaiserliche Marine
- Deutschland (1905), an antarctic research vessel
- German submarine Deutschland, in World War I
- Schulschiff Deutschland, a museum ship
- Deutschland-class cruiser, class of ships known as pocket battleships
  - German cruiser Deutschland
- German training cruiser Deutschland, launched in 1960
- MS Deutschland, a cruise ship launched in 1998
- FV Deutschland, a fishing trawler in service 1934-39. Served as the vorpostenboot V 404 Deutschland and V 403 Deutschland 1939–40

== Other uses ==
- "Deutschland" (song), by Rammstein, 2019

== See also ==
- Dutchland (disambiguation)
- Deutschland 83, a 2015 German television series
- Deutsch-les-Landes, a 2018 Franco-Germanic TV series
- Dutch (disambiguation)
- Deutsch (disambiguation)
- Land (disambiguation)
- Germany (disambiguation)
