= List of ships named Deutschland =

Deutschland has been the name of a number of ships including:

- SS Deutschland, the name of several steamships
- SMS Deutschland, the name of ships of the German Empire's Kaiserliche Marine
- Deutschland-class battleship, built for the German Kaiserliche Marine
- Deutschland (1905), an antarctic research vessel
- German submarine Deutschland, in World War I
- Schulschiff Deutschland, a museum ship
- Deutschland-class cruiser, class of ships known as pocket battleships
  - German cruiser Deutschland
- German training cruiser Deutschland, launched in 1960
- MS Deutschland, a cruise ship launched in 1998
