= Dutchland =

Dutchland may refer to:

- Pennsylvania Dutch Country, also known as Dutchland (Pennsylvania Dutch: Deitschland), an area of Pennsylvania, U.S. with Pennsylvania Dutch inhabitants
  - Lancaster County, Pennsylvania, home of:
    - Dutchland Rollers, or Dutchland Derby Rollers, a women's flat-track roller derby league
- Greater Netherlands, a hypothetical polity of two Dutch-speaking regions of Flanders and the Netherlands
- "Dutchland", a 2012 song by Sidney Samson

== See also ==
- Holland (disambiguation)
- Netherlands (disambiguation)
- Deutschland (disambiguation)
  - Germany (German: Deutschland)
    - German language (German: Deutsch) speaking regions
      - German (German: Deutsche) ethnic regions
- Netherlands, land of the Dutch
  - Dutch language speaking regions
    - Dutch people ethnic regions
- Land (disambiguation)
- Dutch (disambiguation)
- Deutsch (disambiguation)
