= Dutch (nickname) =

When used as a nickname, Dutch may refer to:

== Arts and entertainment ==
- Kenny Howard (1929–1992), aka Von Dutch or Dutch, American motorcycle mechanic, artist and pin striper
- Elmore Leonard (1925–2013), American novelist and screenwriter
- Dutch Mason (1908–2006), Canadian blues musician
- Dutch Robinson, American singer, songwriter and music producer

== Crime ==
- Joseph Paul Cretzer (1911–1946), American bank robber killed in a mass escape attempt from Alcatraz
- Dutch Schultz (1901–1935), American gangster
- Dutch Voight (1888–1986), American mobster

== Military ==
- Norman Cota (1893–1971), US Army major general in World War II
- Petrus Hugo (1917–1986), South African Second World War flying ace

== Politics and government ==
- A. P. Hamann (1909–1977), city manager of San Jose, California
- L. E. Katterfeld (1881–1974), American socialist politician
- Ronald Reagan (1911–2004), 40th President of the United States
- Dutch Ruppersberger (born 1946), U.S. congressman from Maryland

== Sports ==
=== American football ===
- Dutch Clark (1906–1978), National Football League player and coach
- Gustave Ferbert (1873–1943), football player and later head coach at the University of Michigan
- Dutch Lonborg (1898–1985), American collegiate basketball and football coach
- Dutch Meyer (1898–1982), American college football coach
- Dutch Marion (1902–1985), American college and professional football player
- Dennis K. Stanley (1906–1983), American college football player and head coach

=== Baseball ===
- Darren Daulton (1962–2017), Major League Baseball analyst; former player
- Mort Flohr (1911–1994), American Major League Baseball pitcher in 1934
- Troy Herriage (1930–2012), American Major League Baseball pitcher in 1956
- Dutch Holland (1903–1967), Major League Baseball outfielder
- Dutch Leonard (left-handed pitcher) (1892–1952), Major League Baseball pitcher
- Dutch Leonard (right-handed pitcher) (1909–1983), Major League Baseball pitcher
- Dutch McCall (1920–1996), Major League Baseball pitcher
- Dutch Rennert (1930–2018), American Major League Baseball umpire
- Dutch Zwilling (1888–1978), Major League Baseball player

=== Ice hockey ===
- Jim Cain (ice hockey) (1902–1962), Canadian National Hockey League player
- Alf Skinner (1894–1961), Canadian National Hockey League player

=== Other sports ===
- Darren Dutchyshen (born 1966), Canadian sportscaster
- Dutch Harrison (1910–1982), American golfer
- Cornelius Warmerdam (1915–2001), American pole vaulter

== Other vocations ==
- Dutch Boyd (born 1980), American professional poker player
- Howard "Dutch" Darrin (1897–1982), American automotive stylist
- James H. Kindelberger (1895–1962), American aviation pioneer

== See also ==
- Dutch (disambiguation)
- Dutchy (disambiguation)
- Dutchman (disambiguation)
