= Dutch troops in England, 1688–1699 =

Dispositions during the Glorious Revolution

During the English Glorious Revolution of 1688–1699, Dutch troops led by William of Orange were deployed on English soil following William's landing at Brixham on 5 November 1688. The Disbanding the Army Act 1698 required the army to be disbanded, with some exceptions, by 26th March 1699.

== Deployment ==
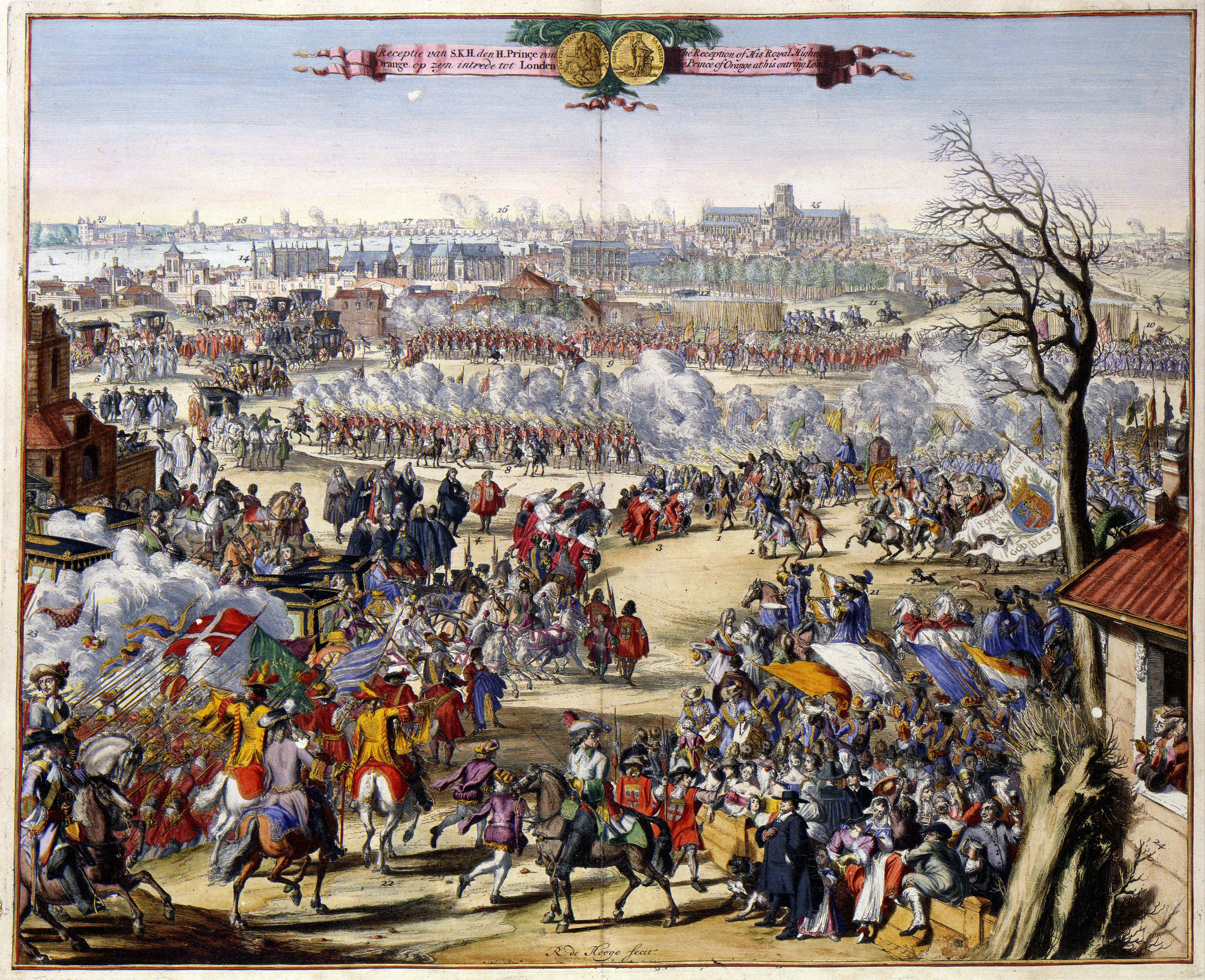
The entrance of William in London, 16 December 1688.

Dutch troops were initially warmly welcomed by the population and were cheered as they marched through London on 18 December 1688. King James's own companies were suspicious, though, and sought assurance that James himself would be safe. In response, James remarked that the Dutch could scarcely treat him worse than his own subjects had. Following their arrival at Whitehall, Westminster, and St James's Palace, William's forces proceeded to march into London to the 'disgust of the English soldiers'. Subsequently, troops dispersed throughout the suburbs to areas such as Chelsea, Kensington, and adjoining districts.

== Glorious Revolution ==
Morale in James's army collapsed, and James was advised to retreat – in the circumstances, a practical admission of defeat. On 23 December, with the blessing of William, James fled into exile in France. He took residence in the palace at St. Germain-en-Laye, where Louis XIV installed him and treated him with all due ceremony as a king.

In January 1689, a new English parliament was elected, and William was crowned king on 11 April, by which time growing anti-Dutch sentiment had become particularly noticeable in London. With some exceptions, The Disbanding the Army Act 1698 required King William's army to be disbanded by 26th March 1699.

== Aftermath ==
Commenting on the period, Jonathan Israel said "the whole business came to seem so improbable that by common consent, scholarly and popular, it was simply erased from the record."
