= SS Deutschland =

SS Deutschland may refer to the following steam-powered ships named Deutschland:

- SS Deutschland (1866), a steamship wrecked in 1875 and commemorated in the Gerard Manley Hopkins poem "The Wreck of the Deutschland"
- SS Deutschland (1870), a coaster in service 1870–1873
- SS Deutschland (1900), a transatlantic ocean liner of 1900
- SS Deutschland (1923), ocean liner launched 1923 and sank 1945
- FV Deutschland, a steam fishing trawler in service 1934–1939, served as the vorpostenboot V 404 Deutschland and V 403 Deutschland 1939–1940

== See also ==
- Deutschland (disambiguation)
- SMS Deutschland
- MS Deutschland, a cruise ship christened in 1998
