= Griffo =

Griffo is a surname. Notable people with the surname include:

- Francesco Griffo (1450–1518), Venetian punchcutter
- Jack Griffo (born 1996), American actor and singer
- Joseph Griffo (born 1956), American politician
- Young Griffo (1871–1927), Australian boxer
