= Deitsch =

Deitsch may refer to:

- Deitsch (surname)
- Pennsylvania Dutch
- Pennsylvania Dutch language

== See also ==
- Deutsch (disambiguation)
