= Dutchman =

Dutchman may refer to:

- a member of the Dutch people

== Arts and entertainment ==
- Dutchman (play), by Amiri Baraka, 1964
- Dutchman (film), a 1967 British drama film
- "The Dutchman" (song), a 1968 song covered by various artists
- "The Dutchman", a character in the 1949 film Malaya
- "The Dutchman", or Jan Strook, a character in the 2016 film Criminal (2016 film)
- The Dutchman (2025 film), a 2025 American thriller film

== People with the nickname ==
- Harry Fritz (baseball) (1890-1974), American Major League Baseball player
- Dutch Schultz (1902–1935), American gangster
- Norm Van Brocklin (1926–1983), American football player and coach

== Places ==
- Dutchman, West Virginia, U.S.
- Dutchman Peak, Oregon, U.S.

== Other uses ==
- Dutchman (repair), a matching piece of good material used to replace a damaged area

== See also ==
- Flying Dutchman (disambiguation)
