= Anti-Dutch sentiment =

Sentiment against the Dutch people

Anti-Dutch sentiment, also known as Dutchphobia, is a spectrum of negative feelings, fears, dislikes and discrimination towards the Netherlands, the Dutch people and the Dutch culture. It historically arose from the colonization that was undertaken by the Netherlands and the roles played by the Dutch in European wars.

== Dutch colonies ==
=== South Africa ===
In South Africa, the Second Boer War (1899–1902) between the British colonial government and the Boers (settlers of Dutch descent) caused anti-Dutch sentiment in the English-speaking white population, and it was identified with the Unionist Party.

=== South America and Caribbean ===
A growing nationalist movement gave rise to anti-Dutch sentiment in the 1950s in the Dutch colony of Surinam. Suriname became self-governing in 1954 and fully independent in 1975.

=== Southeast Asia ===
Most of present-day Indonesia was a Dutch colony, the Dutch East Indies, from 1602 to the 1942 Japanese invasion during the Second World War. After the defeat of the Japanese, the Dutch attempted to reassert control, but there was too much anti-colonial sentiment tied to long-time Dutch neglect of the Colony. Anti-Dutch feeling developed among the native population and encompassed anything associated with the Dutch, especially leading to the occurrence of the Bersiap period. The outcome was the Indonesian National Revolution, which culminated in the 1949 independence of Indonesia.

== European wars ==
=== Anglo-Dutch Wars ===
From the Anglo-Dutch Wars in the 17th and 18th centuries, expressions convey varying degrees of hostility or mockery towards the Dutch, such as "Dutch courage", "Dutch uncle", "Going Dutch", "Dutch treat", "Double Dutch" and "I'm a Dutchman". Anti-Dutch sentiment grew in England during the three wars against the Dutch Republic between 1652 and 1674, and continued during and after the reign of William of Orange.

=== First World War ===
The neutrality maintained by the Netherlands during the First World War evoked unfavourable comment in Britain, as was epitomised by a remark in Punch:

Holland is a low country, in fact it is such a very low country that it is no wonder that it is dammed all round.

— Various,

=== Second World War ===
During the Second World War, the Nazi German occupiers in Belgium promoted the use of Dutch in communities of French-speakers, which led to strong anti-Dutch sentiment there.

== Modern times ==
In Indonesia, anti-Dutch sentiment has remained and been fueled many times since the Sukarno era. Anti-Dutch sentiment is now mainly based on old war propaganda like the South Sulawesi campaign of 1946–1947 in which Abdul Kahar Muzakkar claimed Captain Raymond Westerling had killed 40,000 civilians. It was used by Sukarno to motivate Indonesians to support the Trikora campaign for the colonisation (called "liberation" in Indonesia) of West New Guinea. Sukarno said, "Today we all remember the details of 40,000 people of South Sulawesi as victims of the inhumanity of the Dutch colonial army under the command of Westerling. The inhumanity of the right hand of Imperialism is part of the ruthless imperialism to uphold colonialism on Indonesian soil. The death of 40,000 souls in this episode proves that the people of Indonesia paid for Indonesian Independence". That number is still used to support anti-Dutch sentiment in Indonesia.

Because anti-Dutch sentiment is still inherent in Indonesia, several campaigns have been carried out such as reporting of Dutch war crimes on social media during their occupation of Indonesia, the vandalism of Dutch monuments and the film De Oost telling about Dutch colonialism in Indonesia that turned out to be financed by three Indonesian companies.

== See also ==
- Boerehaat
- Dubul' ibhunu, shoot the Boer, kill the Boer South African song
- Second Boer War concentration camps
- The Goddamned Dutch
