= Dutch Hill =

Dutch Hill may refer to:

- Dutch Hill/Cohocton Wind Farm, a wind farm in Cohocton, New York
- Dutch Hill (Herkimer County, New York), a mountain
