= Deitsch (surname) =

Deitsch is a surname. It is also a Jewish term for people from Benelux. Variants of the surname can be found in other countries like the Netherlands, as well as Germany and the United States.

== People ==
- Fran Landesman (née Deitsch; 1927–2011), American poet
- Richard Deitsch, American sportswriter
- Ryan Deitsch (born 1999), American activist against gun violence

== See also ==
- Deutsch (disambiguation)
