= Dutchy =

Dutchy or Dutchie may refer to:

== People ==
Notable people nicknamed "Dutchy" or "Dutchie" include:

- Dutchy (Apache scout) (born Bakeitzogie; c. 1855–1893), Native American scout during the Apache Wars
- Young Dutchy (born Frederick Hansted; 1853–1911), English-born boxer in Australia and the United States
- Gustave Ferbert (1873–1943), American football player and later head coach at the University of Michigan
- Bob Holland (1946–2017), Australian cricketer
- Brodie Holland (born 1980), Australian rules footballer
- Jack Holland (rugby league) (1922–1994), Australian rugby league footballer
- Patrick Holland (criminal) (died 2009), Irish career criminal
- Dylan Mulholland, fictional character in the Australian TV series Sea Patrol
- John "Dutchie" Rademakers, basketball player in New Zealand; first winner of the New Zealand NBL Kiwi MVP Award (1984)

== Places ==
- Dutchie Butte, see List of mountains in Broadwater County, Montana
- Dutchy Airport, a private airport in the Research Triangle, North Carolina, U.S.

== Products ==
- Dutchie (doughnut), a Canadian doughnut popularized by the Tim Hortons chain
- Dutchie, common English name for Oliebol, a traditional Dutch and Belgian food
- Dutchie, a nickname for Dutch Masters (cigar)

== Other uses ==
- Dutchie, winner of the 1932 Edward Manifold Stakes Australian Thoroughbred horse race
- "Dutchies", nickname of the Kitchener-Waterloo Dutchmen (football), former Canadian football team (1953–1959)
- Dutchy (statue), a removed Confederate monument in Elberton, Georgia
- "Pass the Dutchie", a 1982 song by British Jamaican reggae band Musical Youth

== See also ==
- Dutch (disambiguation)
