= Young Pluto =

Australian Boxer

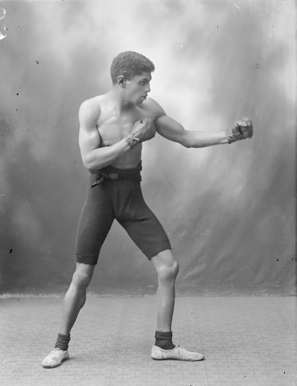
Young Pluto, 1903

Joseph William Dudley Brown (10 July 1872 in Port Elizabeth, Cape Colony – 3 March 1931 at Mosman Park, Western Australia) was a South African-born featherweight boxer, better known as Young Pluto, later Joe Pluto, who lived in Australia for most of his life. His career record was 17–9–12.

== Early life ==
Contemporary sources give Pluto's birth details variously as:

- 13 Sep 1871, Saint John, New Brunswick
- 1870, Port Elizabeth, South Africa
- July 1872, Saint John, New Brunswick
- 1870 (burial record)

In a 1927 newspaper article told (though not written) by Pluto, he is described as a "South African colored boxer", and he specifically states that he was born in South Africa. A modern South African source indicates that he was born on 10 July 1872 in Port Elizabeth, South Africa. Pluto worked on tug-boats as a boy, and was apprenticed to a racing stable, where he rode winners at a light weight.

== Career ==
In Port Elizabeth, South Africa, at age 14 Pluto won 2 four rounders against Young Sultan and Young Berry. He stowed away on the E J Spence, a clipper barque bound for Melbourne, and settled in Port Melbourne. He found work with Caulfield racing trainer T. Brown. He attended the Lyceum Athletic Hall in Fitzroy and was matched with South Melbourne footballer Dick Doran, and with Clancy. His boxing career in NSW got off to a good start when he beat Young Browne in Newcastle, and then had a draw and a win against Young Scott. In 1888 and 1889, he fought Young Griffo to 5 straight draws. One of these fights lasted for seventy rounds. It had been decided beforehand that if both boxers were still standing that it would be declared a draw, however, it was accepted that Young Griffo had been the better boxer during the fight. Pluto moved to Western Australia in 1893. He worked as a battery attendant and physical trainer at the Bayley's Reward Gold Mine at Coolgardie. In 1894 he beat Benny Marks to win the Western Australian lightweight title at Coolgardie's Theatre Royal. In 1898 he left Australia for the Klondike Gold Rush in the Yukon. His first bout was against Californian boxer Kid Williams in Dawson City, which he won. His next bout was against George Dixon for the World Featherweight title. He lost to a knockout in the 10th round. He was the first South African to fight for a world title. He went on to lose his next six bouts, in the US and the United Kingdom.

== Retirement ==
Pluto returned to Western Australia in 1909, where he married and settled down. His last professional bout was in 1911 at Fremantle, with a knockout win over Alec Rogers. In retirement he worked as a boxing instructor in public schools, ran a poultry farm in Redcliffe and worked on local racecourse ground staff. Pluto had three sons and three daughters, including Bill and Cyril Pluto, who became noted welterweight boxers. Cyril, who also fought as Young Pluto, was welterweight and middleweight champion of Western Australia. He died on 3 March 1931 at Mosman Park, a suburb of Perth, Western Australia, after a long heart-related illness. He was buried at the Karrakatta Cemetery.
