= Young Griffo =

Australian boxer (1871–1927)

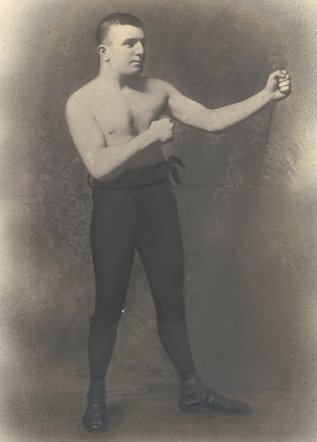
- Griffo, c. 1890

Personal information
- Nickname: Australian Will O' The Wisp
- Nationality: Australian
- Born: Albert Griffiths; 15 April 1869 Millers Point, Sydney, Australia
- Died: 7 December 1927 (aged 58) New York City, New York, U.S.
- Height: 5 ft 4 in (1.63 m)
- Weight: Featherweight; Lightweight

Boxing career
- Reach: 68 in (173 cm)

Boxing record
- Total fights: 229
- Wins: 118
- Win by KO: 33
- Losses: 12
- Draws: 68
- No contests: 31

Albert Griffiths (1 January 1871 – 10 December 1927), better known as Young Griffo, was a World Featherweight boxing champion from 1890 to 1892, and according to many sources, one of the first boxing world champions in any class. Ring magazine founder Nat Fleischer rated Griffo as the eighth greatest featherweight of all time. He was inducted into the Ring Magazine Hall of Fame in 1954, the International Boxing Hall of Fame in 1991, and the Australian National Boxing Hall of Fame in 2003.

During his career he defeated Abe Willis, champion Ike Weir, Horace Leeds, and Joe Harmon. He won bouts against champion Torpedo Billy Murphy a total of four times, twice in World Featherweight title matches. A prolific boxer of great opponents, after coming to America, he fought champions Solly Smith, "Kid" Lavigne, Joe Gans, Tommy Ryan, George Dixon, Frank Erne, and featherweight contender Joe Bernstein. He was recorded as fighting over two hundred professional fights in his career.

Griffo also put together the most consecutive bouts without defeat in recorded boxing history. As of May 2021, with the addition of Newspaper decisions, boxrec.com lists his record as initially starting off at 7–0–3 (2) before he lost his first fight. After losing, he went on a four-year unbeaten streak, accumulating a record of 79–1–38 (20) before being defeated again 125 fights after his first loss. While newspaper decisions are not officially counted, he still went undefeated over this stretch when sportswriters determined the outcome.

== Early life and titles ==
Albert Griffiths was born at Millers Point, Sydney, New South Wales, Australia on 1 January 1871. He took his ringname "Young Griffo" early in his career. Griffo turned pro in 1886, and until the age of 22, fought in his home land of Australia.

For four of his most successful years as a boxer, Harry Tuthill was his athletic trainer and Hugh Behan and Sam Tuckhorn were managers, but by his mid career Griffo went through a host of trainers and managers who tired of his drinking habits and unwillingness to train. He said in a 1902 interview with The Cincinnati Enquirer that Larry Foley of Sydney had acted as an important early boxing mentor, and indeed Griffo had trained at Foley's boxing school at Sydney's White Horse Hotel where several of the greatest champions had spent time, including triple weight class champion Bob Fitzsimmons.

=== Taking Australian Featherweight Championship ===
On 26 December 1889, he fought Nipper Peakes in Melbourne for the Australian Featherweight Championship winning in an eight-round points decision. He held the title for several years defending it against Abe Willis and George McKenzie in Sydney in 1890.

=== Taking World Featherweight Title vs. Billy Murphy, 1890 ===
Billy Murphy, World Featherweight Champion

He first took the World Featherweight Title against Torpedo Billy Murphy on 2 September 1890 at the White Horse Hotel in Sydney in a fifteen-round decision. It was one of the first World Title matches ever held in Australia. At the time, the United States only recognized bouts that took place in North America, and so did not fully accept Griffo's claim to the World Title, but both Australia and Great Britain did. Subsequent to his death, the World Boxing Organization accepted Griffo's claim to the World Featherweight Title.

He defended the British and Australian version of the World Featherweight title against Paddy Moran on 4 November 1890 in a 13-round decision in Sydney. He defended the World Featherweight Title against George Powell on 12 March 1891 in a twenty-round disqualification in Sydney. Griffo defended the World Featherweight Title a third time against Torpedo Billy Murphy again in Sydney, Australia on 22 July 1891, winning in a 20-second round disqualification.

In his final defense of the World Featherweight Title, he defeated Mick McCarthy on 22 March 1892 in Sydney in a fourth-round decision. He eventually vacated the title to fight at a higher weight.

He fought for the Australian Lightweight Title on 25 July 1892 against Jim Barron in Sydney, Australia in a 22-round bout that was declared a draw. The referee called the bout when both boxers appeared too battered and exhausted to continue. According to one source, an audience of 2,500 were present.

== Boxing in the United States ==
In 1893, at the age of 22, he went to America. He boxed in the United States between November 1893 until his retirement from boxing in 1904 and remained there until his death in 1927. He arrived first in San Francisco and may have boxed a few bouts on the West Coast upon his arrival, but accounts differ. One of his first bouts in America was against "Young Scotty" in Chicago on 13 November 1893, where he was reputed to have challenged his opponent to hit him for several minutes while he bobbed his head and managed to avoid nearly every blow. At least one newspaper reported after his death that even in this early stage of his career, he had been pulled from a bar room before the fight with the skilled Black boxer, but his defensive skills in the bout were considered to have been extraordinary with Scotty unable to land a blow.

=== Bout with future World Featherweight Champion Solly Smith ===
On 3 January 1894, he fought future World Featherweight champion Solly Smith at the Tivoli Theatre in Chicago to a six-round draw. Smith, who had distinguished himself by the time he met Griffo, would take the World Featherweight Championship the following year.

On 23 January 1894, he fought an eight-round draw with John Van Heest in Chicago, making an impressive performance.

=== Match with Ike Weir, former world champion ===
On 17 March 1894, Griffo defeated Ike Weir at the Second Regiment Armory in Chicago. Griffo, as a lightweight, outweighed Weir considerably and dominated the bout, which was stopped by the police in the third round when Weir was down. Weir announced retirement after the bout but returned to the ring for a few more professional bouts and exhibitions. Although the bout officially was called a draw by the referee, Griffo knocked Weir down twice in the third round, with Weir taking a while to get to his feet. Many in the crowd were displeased with the official Draw decision. According to the Inter Ocean, as many as 5,000 were in attendance to watch "three of the fastest, fiercest and most brutal rounds ever fought in an American prize ring". Young Griffo made a veritable chopping block of Ike O'Neil Weir, the "Belfast Spider". According to one source, Griffo may have outweighed Wier by as much as 30 lbs. during the bout, but discrepancies in the weights of opponents was more common in this era of boxing. Several newspaper accounts of the fight, written after Griffo's death, wrote that he had been drinking before the bout, but by most accounts he had the edge during most of the fighting, and Weir was a worthy opponent.

On 27 August 1894, he lost to the famed seven-year undefeated World Lightweight Champion Jack McAuliffe in Brooklyn, New York, losing in a 10-round points decision. McAuliffe had lost his World Lightweight Championship only the year before. Griffo had lost few of his fights by referee decision before his bout with the legendary McAuliffe. Due to McAuliffe's extraordinary record as lightweight champion, he was considered one of Griffo's most skilled opponents.

=== Meeting three champions ===
Griffo fought an assortment of opponents who would at one time hold world championships.

==== Bouts with Lightweight contender "Kid" Lavigne ====
On 10 February 1894, he fought future World Lightweight Champion George "Kid" Lavigne for the first time in an eight-round draw in Chicago. On 12 October 1895, he fought Lavigne in a 20-round draw by points decision in Queens, New York. Lavigne would take the World Lightweight Championship only the following year.

He subsequently fought an eight-round draw with the hard-hitting red head boxer Johnny Griffin at the Casino in Boston on 23 April 1894.

On 17 September 1894, he knocked out Eddie Loeber in only 2 minutes 36 seconds of the first round at the Seaside Athletic Club in Brooklyn. The Brooklyn Daily Eagle, wrote that the two men were very "poorly matched", and that it was a relief when the referee Dominick McAffrey stopped the bout. Hundreds of spectators struggled to shake hands with Griffo after the fight's conclusion.

On 4 March 1895, he defeated Horace Leeds at the Seaside Athletic Club in Coney Island in a 12-round bout in front of a sizable crowd of 4000 spectators. One reporter believed Griffo to be over the 133 pound weight limit, and fighting at a weight of as much as 140. The fighting was fierce, and both men were described as being "badly pummeled" in a close bout that had the betting about even. He lost to Leeds on 7 August 1897, in a four-round newspaper decision in Atlantic City, New Jersey. During this period, he was managed by Hugh Behan, but Griffo had an assortment of trainers in his career.

==== Bouts with world champion George Dixon ====
On 28 October 1895, he fought the great Black Canadian champion George Dixon in a 10-round draw by points decision in Manhattan. Dixon had taken the World Featherweight Championship in 1891, and was one of the first recognized world champions. Griffo would fight Dixon two additional times in well attended matches. One source described their 20-round draw as a "battle that bristled throughout with glittering skill and generalship." On 19 January 1895, they would fight a 25-round draw in New York's Coney Island. His manager Hughey Behan had him jailed briefly before the Coney Island bout with Dixon so he could train in a sober state.

==== Arrests for assault and disorderly conduct ====
On 11 April 1896, he was arrested at a Casino he frequented in College Point, Long Island, on charges of assault against William Connors, a town trustee. He was discharged shortly after to attend a scheduled bout against boxer Charles McKeever. On 13 April, the day he would have faced trial on the assault charge, he lost the 20-round bout at the Empire Athletic Club with McKeever in Queens, New York, on a points decision of the referee. On 9 June 1896, he was arrested for driving intoxicated and disorderly conduct in Coney Island, New York, and was arraigned at the Coney Island Police Court. He was sentenced to twenty-five days in prison after pleading guilty. Around 20 November 1897, he was arrested for vagrancy in St. Louis, Missouri, but several nights drinking at a bar may have precipitated the arrest. He was not held for long and fought a bout the following month in California. On 28 September 1898, he was arrested in Chicago found running naked on State Street for a quarter mile. He reportedly assaulted the three officers who tried to arrest him. Another source states he had been drinking the night the incident occurred. On 14 January 1899, he was arrested and brought to Chicago's Harrison Street Police Station for struggling with a police officer to prevent the arrest of a Tom McGinty from the Clover Leaf Saloon, around 2:00 AM but released shortly after. He was sent to an insane asylum on 24 March 1899, after being judged insane in Chicago. He was arrested on suspicion of armed robbery against James H. Wilkerson on 9 September 1901, but only one source mentions this arrest. On 2 February 1902, he was discovered in the cold in a vacant lot near the Bridewell in Chicago, where he had been serving a sentence for disorderly conduct. It was feared he would lose his hands from frostbite. On 6 February 1902, he was sent back to an asylum. Around 25 February 1903, he was sent back to the Bridewell in Chicago for three months for "making trouble".

==== Three bouts with future lightweight Champion Joe Gans ====
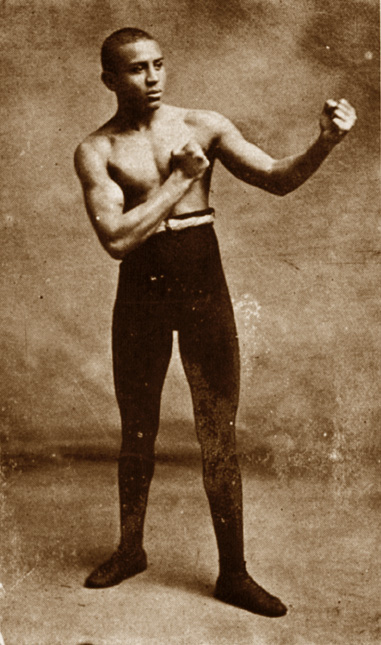
Champion Joe Gans

He fought the legendary World Lightweight champion Joe Gans three times, but never winning a bout. Griffo's 18 November 1895 bout with Gans in Gan's home of Baltimore, Maryland, appeared to some to be only an exhibition, with which many in the crowd were disappointed. A few even considered the bout a "fix", as Griffo told the audience, he had agreed not to "put out" Gans during the bout. Griffo considered his 15-round draw in Athens, Pennsylvania, at the Olympic Athletic Club on 21 September 1897 one of his best, as well as one of Gans' most skilled displays. Of his 10 July 1900 bout with Gans, an eighth-round loss by technical knockout at the Seaside Athletic Club, one source wrote, the referee stopped the bout one minute and 30 seconds into the eighth round when "Griffo was so far gone that another punch from Gans would have put him out." Griffo was reported to have shown some of his early form, but was no match for the blows and conditioning of the "old master" Joe Gans, and was believed by one reporter to have had less stamina as the fight wound on. Griffo was down in both the first and seventh rounds, and he took off nearly a year from his boxing after this last fight with Gans.

=== Bouts with champions Frank Erne, and Billy Murphy ===
He met one time World Featherweight and Lightweight champion Frank Erne on 20 December 1895 in a four-round non-title fight that resulted in a draw in Buffalo, New York.

He defeated Torpedo Billy Murphy in a non-title match ending in an eight-round points decision at the Casino in Boston on 7 May 1894. His 20-round draw bout with Jack Everhardt on 10 July 1896 in Buffalo, New York, was billed as a World 135 pound title. He had previously met Everhardt in a pre-arranged six-round draw in Brooklyn on 25 May, at which the crowd would have preferred a decision by the referee. He lost to World Welter and Middleweight Champion Tommy Ryan on 21 June 1897 in a non-title match in a third-round technical knockout in Brooklyn, New York.

== Late boxing career ==
=== Serving time ===
On 15 August 1896, he was sentenced in Brooklyn to one year in prison for a sexual assault on William Gottlieb the previous April. He did not box from August 1896 until June 1897.

=== Boxing after release ===
On 12 July 1897, he fought well known lightweight Owen Ziegler, in Philadelphia, Pennsylvania, in a six-round bout, which he won by newspaper decision. He considered Ziegler one of his more important opponents.

He fought a close bout with Horace Leeds on 7 August 1897 in Atlantic City, New Jersey, in which The Philadelphia Inquirer felt Leeds had received more points.

On 18 November 1897, Griffo was believed to have been drunk in a contest with Tom Tracey at the Colliseum in St. Louis. He rolled out of the boxing ring in the first round, and referee George Siler declared a No Contest. One source confirmed his story that he had been in a car accident before the fight which was the cause of his inability to complete the first round. The San Francisco Call wrote that Griffo's vehicle had been struck by a street car on the way to the bout, and that he had suffered a sprained shoulder as a result. He and two of his seconds were treated for injuries received as a result of the accident.

He was defeated in an upset by Frank McConnell before three thousand spectators on 3 February 1898 in a 15-rounds points decision in San Francisco, California. McConnell only recently emerged from the amateur ranks, and had relatively little experience as a professional. Griffo showed great defensive skills in several rounds, but McConnell won the bout by taking the offensive throughout most of the fight.

On 26 March 1898, he won a bout with the well known Black boxer, Young Peter Jackson in Red Bluff, California on a fourth-round disqualification. A few at ringside claimed that Jackson was actually Joe Gans, but this was found to be untrue.

=== Tragic bout with Bull McCarthy ===
On the evening of 27 April 1898, he fought Joseph Devitt, who gave the name of the boxer "Bull" McCarthy, in Sacramento, California. Griffo won the 20-round bout by knockout, but Devitt died the following evening of his injuries at Sister's Hospital. Devitt was diagnosed with a brain concussion, likely caused by a rain of blows to his head during the bout. Griffo was briefly taken into custody on charges of manslaughter as a result of the fight. The tragic result was a source of strong remorse for Griffo but it did not deter him from continuing his profession.

== Late career decline ==
On 19 December 1901, he was advised to retire from boxing due to a "valvular affection of the heart that may bring death to him in the ring at any time." The diagnosis was made by a Dr. McGregor of the Olympic Athletic Club, and if accurate should have ended his boxing career.

On 22 August 1902, he lost to three-time World Featherweight Title contender Joe Bernstein in Baltimore, Maryland in a 20-round points decision.

He lost to lightweight boxer Joe Tipman in a fifth-round knockout on 29 September 1902 in Baltimore.

In December 1902, after defeating Jack Bain in a ninth-round knockout in Baltimore, he took off at least a year from boxing before his fight with George Memsic around December 1903, also in Baltimore. In this stage of his career he was managed by Sam Tuckhorn, who was hoping to revive his career and convince the public of his fighting skills, but Griffo was nearing the end of his career.

On 7 December 1903 in Peoria, Illinois, he defeated Jim Kenney in a four-round decision. Griffo showed great speed and cleverness according to the referee, Tom Dunn.

One of his last well publicized bouts was a loss by first-round knockout against Tommy White on 10 February 1904 in Chicago, Illinois. He was already thirty-three at the time, and his age, drinking, and enormous number of previous fights had begun to tell on his speed and endurance in the ring. He was arrested in September 1909 in Chicago, as relatives from Australia had requested his arrest so as to help him obtain treatment for his drinking. Cyber Boxing Zone has him fighting two six-round, no-decision fights as late as 1911 with Welterweight champion William "Honey" Melody in September and Mike Leonard in May in New York, but these bouts were not confirmed by BoxRec and other boxers used the name Young Griffo. He served time at the Bridewell in Chicago, but was released around 28 November 1910, and returned to New York. He had plans to go on the vaudeville circuit with Charles Griffin, another boxer.

In a tribute to Griffo, boxer Tommy Sullivan wrote in the 6 March 1916 Tacoma Daily News:

Not known as much of a puncher, but his skill was uncanny. He had wonderful head work, almost impenetrable defense, dazzling feints, and rapid two-handed methods of attack. The cleverest boxers and hardest punchers were made to look ridiculous when exchanging swats with him. He had a dislike of training and was deemed lazy. There were times he got drunk before a match [such as the Ike Weir and Tommy Tracy bouts].

== Brief film career ==
He appeared as himself in the 1895 lost short Young Griffo vs. Battling Charles Barnett, which at least one source claims is the first film shown for profit. He appeared in at least two other films.

Apparently, two of his film roles were released near or after his death. Released in 1927, he had a minor role in Frank Capra's comedy Long Pants, and the following year in Harry Edwards' 1928 comedy The Best Man.

== Tragic life after boxing ==
In March 1912, Griffo requested to be sent to the New York workhouse, partly a victim of alcoholism, which had affected him intermittently throughout his career. On 11 July 1912, he briefly was jailed for "almstaking" or begging. He had been arrested previously for begging.

For the last 15 years of his life, he took donations and met friends at the entrance to New York's Rialto Theatre on Broadway and 42nd Street, becoming increasingly destitute by 1925. He spent some of his later years in asylums, and received a portion of his income from benefits staged by his friends. He had gained over 50 lbs. by the time of his death. He died in New York of heart disease, initially diagnosed as indigestion, on 7 December 1927 at age 56. He received medical aid too late after dragging himself into a hall from his small, rent-free room in a West side New York boarding house paid for by Jane F. Fish, an author of children's books. Many American newspapers ran stories on his life as a tragic tale of the effects of alcohol. He left no children nor were there any heirs that laid claim to his estate.

Friends of his from the boxing and theatrical community provided for a burial. Several newspaper accounts after his death attributed his financial plight in part to his illiteracy as well as a poor understanding of numbers and currency, which made him an easy victim of unscrupulous handlers.

He was laid to rest at Woodlawn Cemetery after a service at the Madison Avenue Baptist Church. Ring notables in attendance included Jack McAuliffe, Kid McPartland, Tommy Burns, James J. Corbett, and wealthy boxing promoter Tex Rickard, who provided funding for the burial plot and casket. Jane F. Fish also contributed to his funeral. Rickard was later repaid $500 of the $885 of funeral expenses he had donated out of a $3800 estate found to be attributed to Griffo after the funeral.

== Professional boxing record ==
All information in this section is derived from BoxRec, unless otherwise stated.

=== Official record ===
229 fights	68 wins	11 losses
By knockout	33	4
By decision	31	7
By disqualification	4	0
Draws	38	
No contests	31	
Newspaper decisions/draws	81	

All newspaper decisions are officially regarded as "no decision" bouts and are not counted in the win/loss/draw column.

No.	Result	Record	Opponent	Type	Round	Date	Location	Notes
229	Loss	68–11–38 (112)	Tommy White	RTD	1 (6)	10 Feb 1904	Twenty-second Ward A.C., Chicago, Illinois, U.S.	
228	Win	68–10–38 (112)	Martin Judge	PTS	6	30 Jan 1904	Chicago A.A., Chicago, Illinois, U.S.	
227	Draw	67–10–38 (112)	George Memsic	PTS	6	26 Dec 1903	Baltimore, Maryland, U.S.	
226	Win	67–10–37 (112)	Jack Kid Bain	KO	9 (20)	23 Dec 1902	Baltimore, Maryland, U.S.	
225	Loss	66–10–37 (112)	Joe Tipman	KO	5 (20)	29 Sep 1902	Germania Maennerchor Hall, Baltimore, Maryland, U.S.	
224	Loss	66–9–37 (112)	Joe Bernstein	PTS	20	22 Aug 1902	Germania Maennerchor Hall, Baltimore, Maryland, U.S.	
223	Win	66–8–37 (112)	Tommy Daly	PTS	20	25 Jul 1902	Acton's Park, Baltimore, Maryland, U.S.	
222	Win	65–8–37 (112)	Jim Popp	PTS	6	16 Dec 1901	American A.C., Chicago, Illinois, U.S.	
221	Win	64–8–37 (112)	Kid Ash	PTS	10	25 Nov 1901	Phoenix A.C., Cincinnati, Ohio, U.S.	
220	Win	63–8–37 (112)	Ole Olsen	PTS	6	11 Nov 1901	Chicago, Illinois, U.S.	
219	Loss	62–8–37 (112)	Joe Gans	TKO	8 (25)	10 Jul 1900	Seaside A.C., Coney Island, New York, U.S.	
218	Draw	62–7–37 (112)	Jack Lewis	PTS	6	11 May 1900	Chicago, Illinois, U.S.	
217	Win	62–7–36 (112)	Charley Kenney	PTS	6	9 Jan 1900	Tattersall's, Chicago, Illinois, U.S.	
216	Win	61–7–36 (112)	Jack Lewis	PTS	6	6 Jan 1900	Chicago A.C., Chicago, Illinois, U.S.	
215	Win	60–7–36 (112)	Joseph K Devitt	KO	20 (20)	27 Apr 1898	Sacramento, California, U.S.	Devitt died from injuries sustained in the fight
214	Win	59–7–36 (112)	Young Peter Jackson	DQ	4 (12)	26 Mar 1898	Red Bluff, California, U.S.	
213	Loss	58–7–36 (112)	Frank McConnell	PTS	15	3 Feb 1898	Olympic Club, San Francisco, California, U.S.	
212	Win	58–6–36 (112)	Billy Lewis	PTS	10	11 Jan 1898	Vallejo, California, U.S.	
211	Win	57–6–36 (112)	Billy Starr	TKO	4 (10)	26 Dec 1897	San Francisco, California, U.S.	
210	NC	56–6–36 (112)	Tom Tracey	NC	1 (8)	18 Nov 1897	Coliseum, Saint Louis, Missouri, U.S.	They fought for one minute, when Griffo suddenly threw up his arms, sprang to the ropes and started making a speech. He claimed the taxi he was in collided with a streetcar and he was bruised so bad he could not continue
209	Draw	56–6–36 (111)	Frank Garrard	PTS	6	23 Oct 1897	Tattersall's, Chicago, Illinois, U.S.	
208	Win	56–6–35 (111)	Wilmington Jack Daly	NWS	6	27 Sep 1897	Quaker City A.C., Philadelphia, Pennsylvania, U.S.	
207	Draw	56–6–35 (110)	Joe Gans	PTS	15	21 Sep 1897	Olympic A.C., Athens, Pennsylvania, U.S.	
206	Draw	56–6–34 (110)	Charlie McKeever	PTS	15	7 Sep 1897	Olympic A.C., Athens, Pennsylvania, U.S.	
205	Loss	56–6–33 (110)	Horace Leeds	NWS	4	7 Aug 1897	Atlantic City, New Jersey, U.S.	
204	Win	56–6–33 (109)	Owen Ziegler	NWS	6	12 Jul 1897	Arena, Philadelphia, Pennsylvania, U.S.	
203	Win	56–6–33 (108)	Martin Judge	NWS	6	28 Jun 1897	Arena, Philadelphia, Pennsylvania, U.S.	
202	Loss	56–6–33 (107)	Philadelphia Tommy Ryan	TKO	3 (6)	21 Jun 1897	Greenpoint S.C., Brooklyn, New York City, New York, U.S.	
201	Draw	56–5–33 (107)	Joe Powers	PTS	4	21 Jul 1896	Manhattan, New York City, New York, U.S.	
200	Draw	56–5–32 (107)	Billy Ernst	PTS	12	18 Jul 1896	Buffalo, New York, U.S.	
199	Draw	56–5–31 (107)	Jack Everhardt	PTS	20	10 Jul 1896	Empire AC, Lyceum Theatre, Buffalo, New York, U.S.	Billed for world 135lbs title
198	Draw	56–5–30 (107)	Billy Ernst	PTS	12	6 Jun 1896	Unique Theater, Brooklyn, New York City, New York, U.S.	
197	Win	56–5–29 (107)	Sam Tonkins	PTS	10	1 Jun 1896	South Brooklyn A.C., Brooklyn, New York City, New York, U.S.	
196	Draw	55–5–29 (107)	Jack Everhardt	PTS	6	25 May 1896	Empire Theater, Brooklyn, New York City, New York, U.S.	Pre-arranged draw if lasting the distance
195	Loss	55–5–28 (107)	Charlie McKeever	PTS	20	13 Apr 1896	Empire A.C., Maspeth, Queens, New York City, New York, U.S.	
194	Draw	55–4–28 (107)	Frank Erne	PTS	4	20 Dec 1895	Front Street Theater, Baltimore, Maryland, U.S.	
193	Draw	55–4–27 (107)	Joe Gans	PTS	10	18 Nov 1895	Front Street Theater, Baltimore, Maryland, U.S.	Pre-arranged draw if lasting the distance
192	Win	55–4–26 (107)	Jack Hanley	NWS	4	13 Nov 1895	Philadelphia, Pennsylvania, U.S.	
191	Draw	55–4–26 (106)	Jack Randall	NWS	4	7 Nov 1895	Philadelphia, Pennsylvania, U.S.	
190	Draw	55–4–26 (105)	George Dixon	PTS	10	28 Oct 1895	Manhattan A.C., New York City, New York, U.S.	
189	Draw	55–4–25 (105)	George Lavigne	PTS	20	12 Oct 1895	Empire A.C., Maspeth, Queens, New York City, New York, U.S.	For American lightweight title
188	Win	55–4–24 (105)	Billy (Shadow) Maber	KO	? (?)	1 Oct 1895	Coney Island, New York, U.S.	Date uncertain
187	Win	54–4–24 (105)	Charley Barnett	KO	4 (6)	4 May 1895	Manhattan, New York City, New York, U.S.	
186	Win	53–4–24 (105)	George Reynolds	NWS	6	11 Apr 1895	Leland Opera House, Albany, New York, U.S.	
185	Win	53–4–24 (104)	Eddie Curry	PTS	4	30 Mar 1895	New York A.C., Manhattan, New York City, New York, U.S.	
184	Win	52–4–24 (104)	Joe Harmon	PTS	6	26 Mar 1895	Manhattan A.C., Manhattan, New York City, New York, U.S.	
183	Win	51–4–24 (104)	Jerome Quigley	NWS	4	23 Mar 1895	Southwark A.C., Philadelphia, Pennsylvania, U.S.	
182	Draw	51–4–24 (103)	Jack Hanley	NWS	6	20 Mar 1895	Philadelphia, Pennsylvania, U.S.	
181	Win	51–4–24 (102)	Charles Bull McCarthy	NWS	4	16 Mar 1895	Southwark A.C., Philadelphia, Pennsylvania, U.S.	
180	Draw	51–4–24 (101)	Jimmy Dime	PTS	8	8 Mar 1895	Boston, Massachusetts, U.S.	
179	Win	51–4–23 (101)	Horace Leeds	PTS	12	4 Mar 1895	Seaside A.C., Coney Island, New York, U.S.	
178	Draw	50–4–23 (101)	Jerome Quigley	PTS	4	23 Feb 1895	Philadelphia, Pennsylvania, U.S.	
177	Draw	50–4–22 (101)	George Dixon	PTS	25	19 Jan 1895	Seaside A.C., Coney Island, New York, U.S.	
176	Win	50–4–21 (101)	Jack Hanley	NWS	4	8 Dec 1894	Southwark A.C., Philadelphia, Pennsylvania, U.S.	
175	Win	50–4–21 (100)	Kentucky Rosebud	NWS	4	29 Nov 1894	Philadelphia, Pennsylvania, U.S.	
174	Draw	50–4–21 (99)	Charles Bull McCarthy	PTS	4	24 Nov 1894	Philadelphia, Pennsylvania, U.S.	
173	Win	50–4–20 (99)	Eddie Loeber	KO	1 (4)	17 Sep 1894	Seaside A.C., Brooklyn, New York City, New York, U.S.	
172	Loss	49–4–20 (99)	Alf Tompkins	PTS	15	3 Sep 1894	Coney Island, New York, U.S.	
171	Loss	49–3–20 (99)	Jack McAuliffe	PTS	10	27 Aug 1894	Seaside A.C., Brooklyn, New York City, New York, U.S.	
170	ND	49–2–20 (99)	Walter Campbell	ND	10	4 Aug 1894	Coney Island, New York, U.S.	
169	Draw	49–2–20 (98)	George Dixon	PTS	20	29 Jun 1894	Casino, Boston, Massachusetts, U.S.	
168	Win	49–2–19 (98)	Torpedo Billy Murphy	PTS	8	7 May 1894	Casino, Boston, Massachusetts, U.S.	
167	Draw	48–2–19 (98)	Johnny Griffin	PTS	8	23 Apr 1894	Casino, Boston, Massachusetts, U.S.	
166	Draw	48–2–18 (98)	Ike Weir	TD	3 (8)	17 Mar 1894	2nd Regiment Armory, Chicago, Illinois, U.S.	
165	Win	48–2–17 (98)	Ed McCabe	PTS	3	7 Mar 1894	Manhattan, New York City, New York, U.S.	
164	Draw	47–2–17 (98)	George Lavigne	PTS	8	10 Feb 1894	2nd Regiment Armory, Chicago, Illinois, U.S.	
163	Draw	47–2–16 (98)	Johnny Van Heest	PTS	8	23 Jan 1894	Chicago, Illinois, U.S.	
162	Draw	47–2–15 (98)	Solly Smith	PTS	6	3 Jan 1894	Tivoli Theater, Chicago, Illinois, U.S.	
161	Win	47–2–14 (98)	Al Jansen	PTS	6	28 Dec 1893	Chicago, Illinois, U.S.	
160	Draw	46–2–14 (98)	Reg Kid Agnew	PTS	6	20 Dec 1893	Chicago, Illinois, U.S.	
159	Draw	46–2–13 (98)	Tommy White	PTS	8	18 Dec 1893	McGurn's Handball Court, Chicago, Illinois, U.S.	
158	Win	46–2–12 (98)	Young Scotty	NWS	6	13 Nov 1893	Tattersall's, Chicago, Illinois, U.S.	
157	Win	46–2–12 (97)	Maurice (Dummy) Winters	PTS	4	7 Mar 1893	Sydney, New South Wales, Australia	
156	Win	45–2–12 (97)	Jerry Marshall	DQ	4 (25)	28 Feb 1893	Darlinghurst Skating Rink, Sydney, New South Wales, Australia	Billed for world 130lbs title
155	Win	44–2–12 (97)	Jerry Marshall	PTS	12 (25)	20 Dec 1892	Darlinghurst Skating Rink, Sydney, New South Wales, Australia	Billed for world 130lbs title; Police intervened
154	ND	43–2–12 (97)	Sandy Ross	ND	4	6 Dec 1892	Sidney, New South Wales, Australia	
153	Draw	43–2–12 (96)	Martin Denny	PTS	25	8 Nov 1892	Darlinghurst Rink, Darlinghurst, New South Wales, Australia	Billed for world 130lbs title
152	Win	43–2–11 (96)	Charlie Murphy	NWS	4	13 Sep 1892	Darlinghurst Rink, Darlinghurst, New South Wales, Australia	
151	Win	43–2–11 (95)	Charlie Murphy	NWS	4	6 Sep 1892	Darlinghurst Rink, Darlinghurst, New South Wales, Australia	
150	Win	43–2–11 (94)	Jack Melaney	NWS	4	3 Sep 1892	California Athletic Club, Sydney, New South Wales, Australia	
149	Win	43–2–11 (93)	Australian Jim Ryan	NWS	4	27 Aug 1892	California Athletic Club, Sydney, New South Wales, Australia	
148	ND	43–2–11 (92)	Charlie Murphy	ND	4	23 Aug 1892	Sydney, New South Wales, Australia	
147	ND	43–2–11 (91)	George Donnelly	ND	6	20 Aug 1892	Sydney, New South Wales, Australia	
146	ND	43–2–11 (90)	George Donnelly	ND	4	15 Aug 1892	Sydney, New South Wales, Australia	
145	Draw	43–2–11 (89)	Jim Barron	PTS	22 (?)	25 Jul 1892	Darlinghurst Hall, Darlinghurst, New South Wales, Australia	For Australian lightweight title
144	ND	43–2–10 (89)	Abe Willis	ND	4	16 Jul 1892	California Athletic Club, Sydney, New South Wales, Australia	
143	ND	43–2–10 (88)	Chiddy Ryan	ND	6	13 Jul 1892	California Athletic Club, Sydney, New South Wales, Australia	
142	ND	43–2–10 (87)	Jim Bogie	ND	4	5 Jul 1892	Sydney, New South Wales, Australia	
141	ND	43–2–10 (86)	Abe Willis	ND	4	2 Jul 1892	California Athletic Club, Sydney, New South Wales, Australia	
140	ND	43–2–10 (85)	Charlie Dunn	ND	4	25 Jun 1892	California Athletic Club, Sydney, New South Wales, Australia	
139	Loss	43–2–10 (84)	Mick Ryan	PTS	9 (8)	17 May 1892	Golden Gate A.C., Sydney, New South Wales, Australia	Nine rounds mistakenly fought instead of eight
138	ND	43–1–10 (84)	Chiddy Ryan	ND	4	22 Apr 1892	Federation Hall, Sydney, New South Wales, Australia	
137	ND	43–1–10 (83)	Mick McCarthy	ND	4	20 Apr 1892	Sydney, New South Wales, Australia	
136	ND	43–1–10 (82)	Sandy Ross	ND	4	16 Apr 1892	California Athletic Club, Sydney, New South Wales, Australia	
135	Win	43–1–10 (81)	Mick McCarthy	RTD	4 (30)	22 Mar 1892	Gaiety Theatre, Sydney, New South Wales, Australia	Retained world featherweight title
134	ND	42–1–10 (81)	Ned Burden	ND	4	27 Feb 1892	Olympic Club, Sydney, New South Wales, Australia	
133	ND	42–1–10 (80)	Chiddy Ryan	ND	4	6 Feb 1892	California Athletic Club, Sydney, New South Wales, Australia	
132	ND	42–1–10 (79)	Chiddy Ryan	ND	3	12 Jan 1892	Olympic Club, Sydney, New South Wales, Australia	
131	ND	42–1–10 (78)	Chiddy Ryan	ND	4	5 Jan 1892	Sydney, New South Wales, Australia	
130	Win	42–1–10 (77)	Billy Williams	PTS	8	15 Dec 1891	Crystal Palace, Richmond, Melbourne, Victoria, Australia	Retained Australian and world featherweight titles
129	Win	41–1–10 (77)	Young Pluto	NWS	4	14 Nov 1891	Clarke's Theatre, Melbourne, Victoria, Australia	
128	ND	41–1–10 (76)	Chiddy Ryan	ND	4	31 Oct 1891	Sydney, New South Wales, Australia	
127	ND	41–1–10 (75)	Chiddy Ryan	ND	4	17 Oct 1891	Sydney, New South Wales, Australia	
126	ND	41–1–10 (74)	Chiddy Ryan	ND	4	1 Oct 1891	Sydney, New South Wales, Australia	
125	ND	41–1–10 (73)	Ned Burden	ND	4	1 Sep 1891	Sydney, New South Wales, Australia	
124	ND	41–1–10 (72)	Chiddy Ryan	ND	3	22 Aug 1891	Olympic Club, Sydney, New South Wales, Australia	
123	Win	41–1–10 (71)	Torpedo Billy Murphy	DQ	22 (30)	22 Jul 1891	Sydney Amateur Gymnastic Club, Sydney, New South Wales, Australia	Retained world featherweight title
122	ND	40–1–10 (71)	Chiddy Ryan	ND	4	15 Jun 1891	Sydney, New South Wales, Australia	
121	Win	40–1–10 (70)	Joe Molloy	NWS	4	4 Jun 1891	Sydney Amateur Gymnastic Club, Sydney, New South Wales, Australia	
120	Draw	40–1–10 (69)	Chiddy Ryan	NWS	4	30 May 1891	Sydney, New South Wales, Australia	
119	ND	40–1–10 (68)	George Powell	ND	4	11 Apr 1891	Gaiety Theatre, Sydney, New South Wales, Australia	
118	ND	40–1–10 (67)	George Powell	ND	4	21 Mar 1891	Sydney, New South Wales, Australia	
117	ND	40–1–10 (66)	Maurice (Dummy) Winters	ND	4	14 Mar 1891	Golden Gate A.C., Sydney, New South Wales, Australia	
116	Win	40–1–10 (65)	George Powell	DQ	20 (30)	12 Mar 1891	Sydney Amateur Gymnastic Club, Sydney, New South Wales, Australia	Retained world featherweight title
115	ND	39–1–10 (65)	Maurice (Dummy) Winters	ND	4	5 Mar 1891	Sydney, New South Wales, Australia	
114	Win	39–1–10 (64)	Bill Holden	NWS	4	26 Nov 1890	Gaiety Theatre, Sydney, New South Wales, Australia	
113	Win	39–1–10 (63)	Jack Nicholson	NWS	4	24 Nov 1890	Australian AC, Darlinghurst, New South Wales, Australia	
112	Draw	39–1–10 (62)	Australian Jim Ryan	NWS	4	19 Nov 1890	Sydney Amateur Gymnastic Club, Sydney, New South Wales, Australia	
111	Win	39–1–10 (61)	Paddy Moran	RTD	13 (20)	14 Nov 1890	Australian AC, Darlinghurst, New South Wales, Australia	Retained world featherweight title
110	Draw	38–1–10 (61)	Chiddy Ryan	NWS	4	28 Oct 1890	Sydney Amateur Gymnastic Club, Sydney, New South Wales, Australia	
109	Win	38–1–10 (60)	Jack Bateman	NWS	4	18 Oct 1890	California Athletic Club, Sydney, New South Wales, Australia	
108	Win	38–1–10 (59)	Sandy Ross	NWS	4	4 Oct 1890	California Athletic Club, Sydney, New South Wales, Australia	
107	Win	38–1–10 (58)	Billy Williams	NWS	4	26 Sep 1890	Melbourne Athletic Club, Melbourne, Victoria, Australia	
106	Win	38–1–10 (57)	Jack Bateman	NWS	4	18 Sep 1890	California Athletic Club, Sydney, New South Wales, Australia	
105	ND	38–1–10 (56)	Pat McShane	ND	4	9 Sep 1890	Apollo Athletic Hall, Melbourne, Victoria, Australia	
104	Win	38–1–10 (55)	Jack King	NWS	4	8 Sep 1890	Apollo Athletic Hall, Melbourne, Victoria, Australia	
103	Win	38–1–10 (54)	Torpedo Billy Murphy	RTD	15 (?)	2 Sep 1890	Sydney Amateur Gymnastic Club, Sydney, New South Wales, Australia	Won world featherweight title
102	Win	37–1–10 (54)	Chiddy Ryan	NWS	4	19 Jul 1890	California Athletic Club, Sydney, New South Wales, Australia	
101	Win	37–1–10 (53)	Sandy Ross	KO	4 (4)	7 Jul 1890	Sydney Amateur Gymnastic Club, Sydney, New South Wales, Australia	
100	Win	36–1–10 (53)	Joe McLeod	KO	2 (15)	11 Jun 1890	Foley's Hall, Sydney, New South Wales, Australia	
99	Draw	35–1–10 (53)	Abe Willis	NWS	4	7 Jun 1890	Foley's Hall, Sydney, New South Wales, Australia	
98	Win	35–1–10 (52)	Doss Patterson	KO	2 (?)	31 May 1890	Foley's Hall, Sydney, New South Wales, Australia	A finish fight
97	Win	34–1–10 (52)	Richard Deerfoot Rose	RTD	2 (4)	17 May 1890	Foley's Hall, Sydney, New South Wales, Australia	
96	Draw	33–1–10 (52)	Chiddy Ryan	NWS	4	17 May 1890	Foley's Hall, Sydney, New South Wales, Australia	
95	Win	33–1–10 (51)	Jim Burge	NWS	4	10 May 1890	Foley's Hall, Sydney, New South Wales, Australia	
94	Draw	33–1–10 (50)	Porter	NWS	4	28 Apr 1890	Sydney Amateur Athletic Club, Sydney, New South Wales, Australia	
93	Draw	33–1–10 (49)	George McKenzie	NWS	6	19 Apr 1890	Foley's Hall, Sydney, New South Wales, Australia	
92	Draw	33–1–10 (48)	Chiddy Ryan	NWS	4	11 Apr 1890	Foley's Hall, Sydney, New South Wales, Australia	
91	Draw	33–1–10 (47)	Young Fred Smith	NWS	6	5 Apr 1890	Foley's Hall, Sydney, New South Wales, Australia	
90	Win	33–1–10 (46)	Young Fred Smith	RTD	2 (6)	5 Apr 1890	Foley's Hall, Sydney, New South Wales, Australia	
89	Draw	32–1–10 (46)	Chiddy Ryan	NWS	4	29 Mar 1890	Foley's Hall, Sydney, New South Wales, Australia	
88	Win	32–1–10 (45)	Harry Mason	KO	2 (4)	22 Mar 1890	Foley's Hall, Sydney, New South Wales, Australia	
87	Win	31–1–10 (45)	Dallas	NWS	4	22 Mar 1890	Foley's Hall, Sydney, New South Wales, Australia	
86	Win	31–1–10 (44)	Duneef	KO	3 (8)	15 Mar 1890	Foley's Hall, Sydney, New South Wales, Australia	
85	Draw	30–1–10 (44)	Chiddy Ryan	NWS	4	3 Mar 1890	Sydney Gymnastic Club, Sydney, New South Wales, Australia	
84	Win	30–1–10 (43)	Midnight Godfrey	RTD	4 (12)	1 Mar 1890	Foley's Hall, Sydney, New South Wales, Australia	
83	Win	29–1–10 (43)	George McKenzie	PTS	15	17 Feb 1890	Foley's Hall, Sydney, New South Wales, Australia	Retained Australian featherweight title
82	Draw	28–1–10 (43)	Chiddy Ryan	NWS	4	11 Feb 1890	Foley's Hall, Sydney, New South Wales, Australia	
81	Draw	28–1–10 (42)	Unknown	NWS	4	1 Feb 1890	Foley's Hall, Sydney, New South Wales, Australia	
80	Draw	28–1–10 (41)	Abe Willis	NWS	4	24 Jan 1890	Foley's Hall, Sydney, New South Wales, Australia	
79	Win	28–1–10 (40)	Bill Horner	NWS	4	18 Jan 1890	Foley's Hall, Sydney, New South Wales, Australia	
78	Win	28–1–10 (39)	Abe Willis	RTD	3 (20)	11 Jan 1890	Foley's Hall, Sydney, New South Wales, Australia	Retained Australian featherweight title
77	Win	27–1–10 (39)	Will Brummy Fuller	NWS	4	4 Jan 1890	Foley's Hall, Sydney, New South Wales, Australia	
76	Win	27–1–10 (38)	Nipper Peakes	PTS	8	26 Dec 1889	Apollo Athletic Hall, Melbourne, Victoria, Australia	Won Australian featherweight title
75	Draw	26–1–10 (38)	Young Pluto	PTS	70 (?)	12 Dec 1889	Melbourne Athletic Club, Melbourne, Victoria, Australia	A finish fight; 70 rounds-Fight commenced at 8.45 pm and finished at 2.00 am
74	Draw	26–1–9 (38)	Martin Denny	NWS	4	26 Nov 1889	Foley's Hall, Sydney, New South Wales, Australia	
73	Win	26–1–9 (37)	Jem Dempsey	RTD	12 (30)	18 Nov 1889	Foley's Hall, Sydney, New South Wales, Australia	
72	Win	25–1–9 (37)	Dave Lewis	KO	3 (4)	12 Nov 1889	Foley's Hall, Sydney, New South Wales, Australia	
71	Win	24–1–9 (37)	Bill Holden	NWS	4	9 Nov 1889	Foley's Hall, Sydney, New South Wales, Australia	
70	Win	24–1–9 (36)	Mick McCarthy	NWS	4	26 Oct 1889	Foley's Hall, Sydney, New South Wales, Australia	
69	Win	24–1–9 (35)	Will Sullivan	RTD	6 (20)	12 Oct 1889	Foley's Hall, Sydney, New South Wales, Australia	
68	Win	23–1–9 (35)	Bill Horner	NWS	4	28 Sep 1889	Foley's Hall, Sydney, New South Wales, Australia	
67	Win	23–1–9 (34)	Dodger Ryan	PTS	6	21 Sep 1889	Foley's Hall, Sydney, New South Wales, Australia	
66	Win	22–1–9 (34)	Bill Horner	NWS	4	14 Sep 1889	Foley's Hall, Sydney, New South Wales, Australia	
65	Draw	22–1–9 (33)	Bill Horner	NWS	4	31 Aug 1889	Foley's Hall, Sydney, New South Wales, Australia	
64	Draw	22–1–9 (32)	Abe Willis	NWS	4	24 Aug 1889	Foley's Hall, Sydney, New South Wales, Australia	
63	Win	22–1–9 (31)	Doss Patterson	KO	4 (15)	17 Aug 1889	Foley's Hall, Sydney, New South Wales, Australia	
62	Win	21–1–9 (31)	Unknown	NWS	4	10 Aug 1889	Foley's Hall, Sydney, New South Wales, Australia	
61	Win	21–1–9 (30)	Duneef	NWS	3	5 Aug 1889	Foley's Hall, Sydney, New South Wales, Australia	
60	Draw	21–1–9 (29)	Abe Willis	PTS	20	27 Jul 1889	Foley's Hall, Sydney, New South Wales, Australia	
59	Draw	21–1–8 (29)	Mick McCarthy	NWS	4	13 Jul 1889	Foley's Hall, Sydney, New South Wales, Australia	
58	Win	21–1–8 (28)	Mick O'Brien	NWS	4	6 Jul 1889	Foley's Hall, Sydney, New South Wales, Australia	
57	Win	21–1–8 (27)	Mick O'Brien	NWS	4	29 Jun 1889	Foley's Hall, Sydney, New South Wales, Australia	
56	Win	21–1–8 (26)	Kiama Pet	RTD	2 (4)	15 Jun 1889	Foley's Hall, Sydney, New South Wales, Australia	
55	Draw	20–1–8 (26)	Mick McCarthy	NWS	4	10 Jun 1889	Foley's Hall, Sydney, New South Wales, Australia	
54	Win	20–1–8 (25)	Alf Lane	RTD	2 (8)	6 Jun 1889	Foley's Hall, Sydney, New South Wales, Australia	
53	Win	19–1–8 (25)	Bill Holden	RTD	14 (15)	24 May 1889	Foley's Hall, Sydney, New South Wales, Australia	
52	Win	18–1–8 (25)	Mick McCarthy	NWS	4	20 May 1889	Foley's Hall, Sydney, New South Wales, Australia	
51	Win	18–1–8 (24)	Bill Holden	NWS	4	4 May 1889	Foley's Hall, Sydney, New South Wales, Australia	
50	Win	18–1–8 (23)	Mick O'Brien	NWS	4	27 Apr 1889	Foley's Hall, Sydney, New South Wales, Australia	
49	Win	18–1–8 (22)	Mick McCarthy	NWS	4	22 Apr 1889	Foley's Hall, Sydney, New South Wales, Australia	
48	Draw	18–1–8 (21)	Horden	NWS	4	20 Apr 1889	Foley's Hall, Sydney, New South Wales, Australia	
47	Draw	18–1–8 (20)	Mick O'Brien	PTS	8	16 Apr 1889	Foley's Hall, Sydney, New South Wales, Australia	
46	Win	18–1–7 (20)	Bill Horner	NWS	4	6 Apr 1889	Foley's Hall, Sydney, New South Wales, Australia	
45	Win	18–1–7 (19)	Mick O'Brien	PTS	8	27 Mar 1889	Foley's Hall, Sydney, New South Wales, Australia	
44	Win	17–1–7 (19)	Jack Adamson	NWS	3	2 Mar 1889	Foley's Hall, Sydney, New South Wales, Australia	
43	Draw	17–1–7 (18)	Ambrose Taylor	PTS	8	2 Feb 1889	Foley's Hall, Sydney, New South Wales, Australia	
42	Win	17–1–6 (18)	Bill Doolan	NWS	4	19 Jan 1889	Foley's Hall, Sydney, New South Wales, Australia	
41	Win	17–1–6 (17)	Dick Murphy	RTD	2 (4)	12 Jan 1889	Foley's White Horse Gym, Sydney, New South Wales, Australia	
40	Win	16–1–6 (17)	Matt Ritchie	NWS	4	15 Dec 1888	Hibernian Hall, Melbourne, Victoria, Australia	
39	Win	16–1–6 (16)	Torpedo Billy Murphy	PTS	4	10 Dec 1888	Hibernian Hall, Melbourne, Victoria, Australia	
38	Draw	15–1–6 (16)	Frank Burns	NWS	4	1 Dec 1888	Hibernian Hall, Melbourne, Victoria, Australia	
37	Draw	15–1–6 (15)	Jones	NWS	4	26 Nov 1888	Hibernian Hall, Melbourne, Victoria, Australia	
36	Win	15–1–6 (14)	Frank Young McShane	PTS	4	17 Nov 1888	Hibernian Hall, Melbourne, Victoria, Australia	
35	Draw	14–1–6 (14)	Young Pluto	NWS	3	3 Nov 1888	Hibernian Hall, Melbourne, Victoria, Australia	
34	Win	14–1–6 (13)	Frank Young McShane	NWS	4	20 Oct 1888	Apollo Athletic Hall, Melbourne, Victoria, Australia	
33	Draw	14–1–6 (12)	Alf Lawrence	PTS	8	22 Sep 1888	Apollo Athletic Hall, Melbourne, Victoria, Australia	
32	Win	14–1–5 (12)	Dick Cook	PTS	6	20 Sep 1888	Centennial Hippodrome, Melbourne, Victoria, Australia	
31	Win	13–1–5 (12)	Sam McLeod	PTS	6	20 Sep 1888	Centennial Hippodrome, Melbourne, Victoria, Australia	
30	Win	12–1–5 (12)	George Fogg	PTS	6	20 Sep 1888	Centennial Hippodrome, Melbourne, Victoria, Australia	
29	Win	11–1–5 (12)	Dick Corbett	PTS	6	19 Sep 1888	Centennial Hippodrome, Melbourne, Victoria, Australia	
28	Win	10–1–5 (12)	Frank Young McShane	NWS	4	15 Sep 1888	Apollo Athletic Hall, Melbourne, Victoria, Australia	
27	Draw	10–1–5 (11)	Frank Young McShane	PTS	8	8 Sep 1888	Apollo Athletic Hall, Melbourne, Victoria, Australia	
26	Win	10–1–4 (11)	Young Pluto	NWS	4	1 Sep 1888	Apollo Athletic Hall, Melbourne, Victoria, Australia	
25	Win	10–1–4 (10)	Young Dalley	NWS	4	25 Aug 1888	Apollo Athletic Hall, Melbourne, Victoria, Australia	
24	Win	10–1–4 (9)	Chappie Chapman	KO	4 (6)	23 Aug 1888	Roachock's Hall, Adelaide, South Australia, Australia	
23	Win	9–1–4 (9)	Jack Smith	PTS	4	8 Aug 1888	Roachock's Hall, Adelaide, South Australia, Australia	
22	Draw	8–1–4 (9)	Michis	NWS	4	9 Jul 1888	Hibernian Hall, Melbourne, Victoria, Australia	
21	Win	8–1–4 (8)	Young Dutchy	KO	4 (8)	2 Jul 1888	Boland's Athletic Hall, Melbourne, Victoria, Australia	
20	Draw	7–1–4 (8)	Young Pluto	PTS	13 (?)	6 Jun 1888	Victor's Athletic Hall, Melbourne, Victoria, Australia	
19	Draw	7–1–3 (8)	Young Pluto	PTS	19 (?)	25 May 1888	Open Field, Lilydale, Melbourne, Victoria, Australia	A finish fight
18	Draw	7–1–2 (8)	Matt Ritchie	PTS	8	19 May 1888	Apollo Athletic Hall, Melbourne, Victoria, Australia	
17	Draw	7–1–1 (8)	Jack King	NWS	4	5 May 1888	Apollo Athletic Hall, Melbourne, Victoria, Australia	
16	Draw	7–1–1 (7)	Young Pluto	PTS	8	30 Apr 1888	Victor's Athletic Hall, Melbourne, Victoria, Australia	Possibly a prearranged draw
15	Win	7–1 (7)	Essy McGuire	KO	10 (?)	5 Apr 1888	Foley's Hall, Sydney, New South Wales, Australia	
14	Win	6–1 (7)	Jack Heaney	PTS	4	24 Mar 1888	Foley's Hall, Sydney, New South Wales, Australia	
13	Loss	5–1 (7)	Bill Oates	PTS	6	17 Mar 1888	Foley's Hall, Sydney, New South Wales, Australia	
12	Draw	5–0 (7)	Jim Donnelly	NWS	4	3 Mar 1888	Foley's Hall, Sydney, New South Wales, Australia	
11	Win	5–0 (6)	Jack Poultney	NWS	4	29 Feb 1888	Foley's Hall, Sydney, New South Wales, Australia	
10	Win	5–0 (5)	Jim Donnelly	NWS	4	25 Feb 1888	Foley's Hall, Sydney, New South Wales, Australia	
9	Draw	5–0 (4)	Arthur Aitken	NWS	3	4 Feb 1888	Foley's Hall, Sydney, New South Wales, Australia	
8	Draw	5–0 (3)	Flemming	NWS	4	14 Jan 1888	Foley's Hall, Sydney, New South Wales, Australia	
7	ND	5–0 (2)	Binks	ND	4	10 Jan 1888	Foley's Hall, Sydney, New South Wales, Australia	
6	Win	5–0 (1)	Bob O'Neill	PTS	15	1 Mar 1887	Sydney, New South Wales, Australia	Date uncertain
5	Win	4–0 (1)	Ben Francis	KO	7 (?)	1 Feb 1887	Sydney, New South Wales, Australia	Date uncertain
4	Win	3–0 (1)	Tom Whalen	KO	10 (?)	1 Jan 1887	Foley's Hall, Sydney, New South Wales, Australia	Date uncertain
3	Win	2–0 (1)	Frank Silver	KO	49 (?)	1 Mar 1886	Sydney, New South Wales, Australia	Date uncertain
2	Win	1–0 (1)	Bill Griffiths	KO	3 (?)	2 Feb 1886	The Green, Dawes Point, Sydney, New South Wales, Australia	Date uncertain
1	ND	0–0 (1)	Bill Scott	ND	4	1 Jan 1886	Sydney, New South Wales, Australia	Date uncertain

=== Unofficial record ===
229 fights	118 wins	12 losses
By knockout	33	4
By decision	81	8
By disqualification	4	0
Draws	68	
No contests	31	

Record with the inclusion of newspaper decisions to the win/loss/draw column.

No.	Result	Record	Opponent	Type	Round	Date	Location	Notes
229	Loss	118–12–68 (31)	Tommy White	RTD	1 (6)	10 Feb 1904	Twenty-second Ward A.C., Chicago, Illinois, U.S.	
228	Win	118–11–68 (31)	Martin Judge	PTS	6	30 Jan 1904	Chicago A.A., Chicago, Illinois, U.S.	
227	Draw	117–11–68 (31)	George Memsic	PTS	6	26 Dec 1903	Baltimore, Maryland, U.S.	
226	Win	117–11–67 (31)	Jack Kid Bain	KO	9 (20)	23 Dec 1902	Baltimore, Maryland, U.S.	
225	Loss	116–11–67 (31)	Joe Tipman	KO	5 (20)	29 Sep 1902	Germania Maennerchor Hall, Baltimore, Maryland, U.S.	
224	Loss	116–10–67 (31)	Joe Bernstein	PTS	20	22 Aug 1902	Germania Maennerchor Hall, Baltimore, Maryland, U.S.	
223	Win	116–9–67 (31)	Tommy Daly	PTS	20	25 Jul 1902	Acton's Park, Baltimore, Maryland, U.S.	
222	Win	115–9–67 (31)	Jim Popp	PTS	6	16 Dec 1901	American A.C., Chicago, Illinois, U.S.	
221	Win	114–9–67 (31)	Kid Ash	PTS	10	25 Nov 1901	Phoenix A.C., Cincinnati, Ohio, U.S.	
220	Win	113–9–67 (31)	Ole Olsen	PTS	6	11 Nov 1901	Chicago, Illinois, U.S.	
219	Loss	112–9–67 (31)	Joe Gans	TKO	8 (25)	10 Jul 1900	Seaside A.C., Coney Island, New York, U.S.	
218	Draw	112–8–67 (31)	Jack Lewis	PTS	6	11 May 1900	Chicago, Illinois, U.S.	
217	Win	112–8–66 (31)	Charley Kenney	PTS	6	9 Jan 1900	Tattersall's, Chicago, Illinois, U.S.	
216	Win	111–8–66 (31)	Jack Lewis	PTS	6	6 Jan 1900	Chicago A.C., Chicago, Illinois, U.S.	
215	Win	110–8–66 (31)	Joseph K Devitt	KO	20 (20)	27 Apr 1898	Sacramento, California, U.S.	Devitt died from injuries sustained in the fight
214	Win	109–8–66 (31)	Young Peter Jackson	DQ	4 (12)	26 Mar 1898	Red Bluff, California, U.S.	
213	Loss	108–8–66 (31)	Frank McConnell	PTS	15	3 Feb 1898	Olympic Club, San Francisco, California, U.S.	
212	Win	108–7–66 (31)	Billy Lewis	PTS	10	11 Jan 1898	Vallejo, California, U.S.	
211	Win	107–7–66 (31)	Billy Starr	TKO	4 (10)	26 Dec 1897	San Francisco, California, U.S.	
210	ND	106–7–66 (31)	Tom Tracey	NC	1 (8)	18 Nov 1897	Coliseum, Saint Louis, Missouri, U.S.	They fought for one minute, when Griffo suddenly threw up his arms, sprang to the ropes and started making a speech. He claimed the taxi he was in collided with a streetcar and he was bruised so bad he could not continue
209	Draw	106–7–66 (30)	Frank Garrard	PTS	6	23 Oct 1897	Tattersall's, Chicago, Illinois, U.S.	
208	Win	106–7–65 (30)	Wilmington Jack Daly	NWS	6	27 Sep 1897	Quaker City A.C., Philadelphia, Pennsylvania, U.S.	
207	Draw	105–7–65 (30)	Joe Gans	PTS	15	21 Sep 1897	Olympic A.C., Athens, Pennsylvania, U.S.	
206	Draw	105–7–64 (30)	Charlie McKeever	PTS	15	7 Sep 1897	Olympic A.C., Athens, Pennsylvania, U.S.	
205	Loss	105–7–63 (30)	Horace Leeds	NWS	4	7 Aug 1897	Atlantic City, New Jersey, U.S.	
204	Win	105–6–63 (30)	Owen Ziegler	NWS	6	12 Jul 1897	Arena, Philadelphia, Pennsylvania, U.S.	
203	Win	104–6–63 (30)	Martin Judge	NWS	6	28 Jun 1897	Arena, Philadelphia, Pennsylvania, U.S.	
202	Loss	103–6–63 (30)	Philadelphia Tommy Ryan	TKO	3 (6)	21 Jun 1897	Greenpoint S.C., Brooklyn, New York City, New York, U.S.	
201	Draw	103–5–63 (30)	Joe Powers	PTS	4	21 Jul 1896	Manhattan, New York City, New York, U.S.	
200	Draw	103–5–62 (30)	Billy Ernst	PTS	12	18 Jul 1896	Buffalo, New York, U.S.	
199	Draw	103–5–61 (30)	Jack Everhardt	PTS	20	10 Jul 1896	Empire AC, Lyceum Theatre, Buffalo, New York, U.S.	Billed for world 135lbs title
198	Draw	103–5–60 (30)	Billy Ernst	PTS	12	6 Jun 1896	Unique Theater, Brooklyn, New York City, New York, U.S.	
197	Win	103–5–59 (30)	Sam Tonkins	PTS	10	1 Jun 1896	South Brooklyn A.C., Brooklyn, New York City, New York, U.S.	
196	Draw	102–5–59 (30)	Jack Everhardt	PTS	6	25 May 1896	Empire Theater, Brooklyn, New York City, New York, U.S.	Pre-arranged draw if lasting the distance
195	Loss	102–5–58 (30)	Charlie McKeever	PTS	20	13 Apr 1896	Empire A.C., Maspeth, Queens, New York City, New York, U.S.	
194	Draw	102–4–58 (30)	Frank Erne	PTS	4	20 Dec 1895	Front Street Theater, Baltimore, Maryland, U.S.	
193	Draw	102–4–57 (30)	Joe Gans	PTS	10	18 Nov 1895	Front Street Theater, Baltimore, Maryland, U.S.	Pre-arranged draw if lasting the distance
192	Win	102–4–56 (30)	Jack Hanley	NWS	4	13 Nov 1895	Philadelphia, Pennsylvania, U.S.	
191	Draw	101–4–56 (30)	Jack Randall	NWS	4	7 Nov 1895	Philadelphia, Pennsylvania, U.S.	
190	Draw	101–4–55 (30)	George Dixon	PTS	10	28 Oct 1895	Manhattan A.C., New York City, New York, U.S.	
189	Draw	101–4–54 (30)	George Lavigne	PTS	20	12 Oct 1895	Empire A.C., Maspeth, Queens, New York City, New York, U.S.	For American lightweight title
188	Win	101–4–53 (30)	Billy (Shadow) Maber	KO	? (?)	1 Oct 1895	Coney Island, New York, U.S.	Date uncertain
187	Win	100–4–53 (30)	Charley Barnett	KO	4 (6)	4 May 1895	Manhattan, New York City, New York, U.S.	
186	Win	99–4–53 (30)	George Reynolds	NWS	6	11 Apr 1895	Leland Opera House, Albany, New York, U.S.	
185	Win	98–4–53 (30)	Eddie Curry	PTS	4	30 Mar 1895	New York A.C., Manhattan, New York City, New York, U.S.	
184	Win	97–4–53 (30)	Joe Harmon	PTS	6	26 Mar 1895	Manhattan A.C., Manhattan, New York City, New York, U.S.	
183	Win	96–4–53 (30)	Jerome Quigley	NWS	4	23 Mar 1895	Southwark A.C., Philadelphia, Pennsylvania, U.S.	
182	Draw	95–4–53 (30)	Jack Hanley	NWS	6	20 Mar 1895	Philadelphia, Pennsylvania, U.S.	
181	Win	95–4–52 (30)	Charles Bull McCarthy	NWS	4	16 Mar 1895	Southwark A.C., Philadelphia, Pennsylvania, U.S.	
180	Draw	94–4–52 (30)	Jimmy Dime	PTS	8	8 Mar 1895	Boston, Massachusetts, U.S.	
179	Win	94–4–51 (30)	Horace Leeds	PTS	12	4 Mar 1895	Seaside A.C., Coney Island, New York, U.S.	
178	Draw	93–4–51 (30)	Jerome Quigley	PTS	4	23 Feb 1895	Philadelphia, Pennsylvania, U.S.	
177	Draw	93–4–50 (30)	George Dixon	PTS	25	19 Jan 1895	Seaside A.C., Coney Island, New York, U.S.	
176	Win	93–4–49 (30)	Jack Hanley	NWS	4	8 Dec 1894	Southwark A.C., Philadelphia, Pennsylvania, U.S.	
175	Win	92–4–49 (30)	Kentucky Rosebud	NWS	4	29 Nov 1894	Philadelphia, Pennsylvania, U.S.	
174	Draw	91–4–49 (30)	Charles Bull McCarthy	PTS	4	24 Nov 1894	Philadelphia, Pennsylvania, U.S.	
173	Win	91–4–48 (30)	Eddie Loeber	KO	1 (4)	17 Sep 1894	Seaside A.C., Brooklyn, New York City, New York, U.S.	
172	Loss	90–4–48 (30)	Alf Tompkins	PTS	15	3 Sep 1894	Coney Island, New York, U.S.	
171	Loss	90–3–48 (30)	Jack McAuliffe	PTS	10	27 Aug 1894	Seaside A.C., Brooklyn, New York City, New York, U.S.	
170	ND	90–2–48 (30)	Walter Campbell	ND	10	4 Aug 1894	Coney Island, New York, U.S.	
169	Draw	90–2–48 (29)	George Dixon	PTS	20	29 Jun 1894	Casino, Boston, Massachusetts, U.S.	
168	Win	90–2–47 (29)	Torpedo Billy Murphy	PTS	8	7 May 1894	Casino, Boston, Massachusetts, U.S.	
167	Draw	89–2–47 (29)	Johnny Griffin	PTS	8	23 Apr 1894	Casino, Boston, Massachusetts, U.S.	
166	Draw	89–2–46 (29)	Ike Weir	TD	3 (8)	17 Mar 1894	2nd Regiment Armory, Chicago, Illinois, U.S.	
165	Win	89–2–45 (29)	Ed McCabe	PTS	3	7 Mar 1894	Manhattan, New York City, New York, U.S.	
164	Draw	88–2–45 (29)	George Lavigne	PTS	8	10 Feb 1894	2nd Regiment Armory, Chicago, Illinois, U.S.	
163	Draw	88–2–44 (29)	Johnny Van Heest	PTS	8	23 Jan 1894	Chicago, Illinois, U.S.	
162	Draw	88–2–43 (29)	Solly Smith	PTS	6	3 Jan 1894	Tivoli Theater, Chicago, Illinois, U.S.	
161	Win	88–2–42 (29)	Al Jansen	PTS	6	28 Dec 1893	Chicago, Illinois, U.S.	
160	Draw	87–2–42 (29)	Reg Kid Agnew	PTS	6	20 Dec 1893	Chicago, Illinois, U.S.	
159	Draw	87–2–41 (29)	Tommy White	PTS	8	18 Dec 1893	McGurn's Handball Court, Chicago, Illinois, U.S.	
158	Win	87–2–40 (29)	Young Scotty	NWS	6	13 Nov 1893	Tattersall's, Chicago, Illinois, U.S.	
157	Win	86–2–40 (29)	Maurice (Dummy) Winters	PTS	4	7 Mar 1893	Sydney, New South Wales, Australia	
156	Win	85–2–40 (29)	Jerry Marshall	DQ	4 (25)	28 Feb 1893	Darlinghurst Skating Rink, Sydney, New South Wales, Australia	Billed for world 130lbs title
155	Win	84–2–40 (29)	Jerry Marshall	PTS	12 (25)	20 Dec 1892	Darlinghurst Skating Rink, Sydney, New South Wales, Australia	Billed for world 130lbs title; Police intervened
154	ND	83–2–40 (29)	Sandy Ross	ND	4	6 Dec 1892	Sidney, New South Wales, Australia	
153	Draw	83–2–40 (28)	Martin Denny	PTS	25	8 Nov 1892	Darlinghurst Rink, Darlinghurst, New South Wales, Australia	Billed for world 130lbs title
152	Win	83–2–39 (28)	Charlie Murphy	NWS	4	13 Sep 1892	Darlinghurst Rink, Darlinghurst, New South Wales, Australia	
151	Win	82–2–39 (28)	Charlie Murphy	NWS	4	6 Sep 1892	Darlinghurst Rink, Darlinghurst, New South Wales, Australia	
150	Win	81–2–39 (28)	Jack Melaney	NWS	4	3 Sep 1892	California Athletic Club, Sydney, New South Wales, Australia	
149	Win	80–2–39 (28)	Australian Jim Ryan	NWS	4	27 Aug 1892	California Athletic Club, Sydney, New South Wales, Australia	
148	ND	79–2–39 (28)	Charlie Murphy	ND	4	23 Aug 1892	Sydney, New South Wales, Australia	
147	ND	79–2–39 (27)	George Donnelly	ND	6	20 Aug 1892	Sydney, New South Wales, Australia	
146	ND	79–2–39 (26)	George Donnelly	ND	4	15 Aug 1892	Sydney, New South Wales, Australia	
145	Draw	79–2–39 (25)	Jim Barron	PTS	22 (?)	25 Jul 1892	Darlinghurst Hall, Darlinghurst, New South Wales, Australia	For Australian lightweight title
144	ND	79–2–38 (25)	Abe Willis	ND	4	16 Jul 1892	California Athletic Club, Sydney, New South Wales, Australia	
143	ND	79–2–38 (24)	Chiddy Ryan	ND	6	13 Jul 1892	California Athletic Club, Sydney, New South Wales, Australia	
142	ND	79–2–38 (23)	Jim Bogie	ND	4	5 Jul 1892	Sydney, New South Wales, Australia	
141	ND	79–2–38 (22)	Abe Willis	ND	4	2 Jul 1892	California Athletic Club, Sydney, New South Wales, Australia	
140	ND	79–2–38 (21)	Charlie Dunn	ND	4	25 Jun 1892	California Athletic Club, Sydney, New South Wales, Australia	
139	Loss	79–2–38 (20)	Mick Ryan	PTS	9 (8)	17 May 1892	Golden Gate A.C., Sydney, New South Wales, Australia	Nine rounds mistakenly fought instead of eight
138	ND	79–1–38 (20)	Chiddy Ryan	ND	4	22 Apr 1892	Federation Hall, Sydney, New South Wales, Australia	
137	ND	79–1–38 (19)	Mick McCarthy	ND	4	20 Apr 1892	Sydney, New South Wales, Australia	
136	ND	79–1–38 (18)	Sandy Ross	ND	4	16 Apr 1892	California Athletic Club, Sydney, New South Wales, Australia	
135	Win	79–1–38 (17)	Mick McCarthy	RTD	4 (30)	22 Mar 1892	Gaiety Theatre, Sydney, New South Wales, Australia	Retained world featherweight title
134	ND	78–1–38 (17)	Ned Burden	ND	4	27 Feb 1892	Olympic Club, Sydney, New South Wales, Australia	
133	ND	78–1–38 (16)	Chiddy Ryan	ND	4	6 Feb 1892	California Athletic Club, Sydney, New South Wales, Australia	
132	ND	78–1–38 (15)	Chiddy Ryan	ND	3	12 Jan 1892	Olympic Club, Sydney, New South Wales, Australia	
131	ND	78–1–38 (14)	Chiddy Ryan	ND	4	5 Jan 1892	Sydney, New South Wales, Australia	
130	Win	78–1–38 (13)	Billy Williams	PTS	8	15 Dec 1891	Crystal Palace, Richmond, Melbourne, Victoria, Australia	Retained Australian and world featherweight titles
129	Win	77–1–38 (13)	Young Pluto	NWS	4	14 Nov 1891	Clarke's Theatre, Melbourne, Victoria, Australia	
128	ND	76–1–38 (13)	Chiddy Ryan	ND	4	31 Oct 1891	Sydney, New South Wales, Australia	
127	ND	76–1–38 (12)	Chiddy Ryan	ND	4	17 Oct 1891	Sydney, New South Wales, Australia	
126	ND	76–1–38 (11)	Chiddy Ryan	ND	4	1 Oct 1891	Sydney, New South Wales, Australia	
125	ND	76–1–38 (10)	Ned Burden	ND	4	1 Sep 1891	Sydney, New South Wales, Australia	
124	ND	76–1–38 (9)	Chiddy Ryan	ND	3	22 Aug 1891	Olympic Club, Sydney, New South Wales, Australia	
123	Win	76–1–38 (8)	Torpedo Billy Murphy	DQ	22 (30)	22 Jul 1891	Sydney Amateur Gymnastic Club, Sydney, New South Wales, Australia	Retained world featherweight title
122	ND	75–1–38 (8)	Chiddy Ryan	ND	4	15 Jun 1891	Sydney, New South Wales, Australia	
121	Win	75–1–38 (7)	Joe Molloy	NWS	4	4 Jun 1891	Sydney Amateur Gymnastic Club, Sydney, New South Wales, Australia	
120	Draw	74–1–38 (7)	Chiddy Ryan	NWS	4	30 May 1891	Sydney, New South Wales, Australia	
119	ND	74–1–37 (7)	George Powell	ND	4	11 Apr 1891	Gaiety Theatre, Sydney, New South Wales, Australia	
118	ND	74–1–37 (6)	George Powell	ND	4	21 Mar 1891	Sydney, New South Wales, Australia	
117	ND	74–1–37 (5)	Maurice (Dummy) Winters	ND	4	14 Mar 1891	Golden Gate A.C., Sydney, New South Wales, Australia	
116	Win	74–1–37 (4)	George Powell	DQ	20 (30)	12 Mar 1891	Sydney Amateur Gymnastic Club, Sydney, New South Wales, Australia	Retained world featherweight title
115	ND	73–1–37 (4)	Maurice (Dummy) Winters	ND	4	5 Mar 1891	Sydney, New South Wales, Australia	
114	Win	73–1–37 (3)	Bill Holden	NWS	4	26 Nov 1890	Gaiety Theatre, Sydney, New South Wales, Australia	
113	Win	72–1–37 (3)	Jack Nicholson	NWS	4	24 Nov 1890	Australian AC, Darlinghurst, New South Wales, Australia	
112	Draw	71–1–37 (3)	Australian Jim Ryan	NWS	4	19 Nov 1890	Sydney Amateur Gymnastic Club, Sydney, New South Wales, Australia	
111	Win	71–1–36 (3)	Paddy Moran	RTD	13 (20)	14 Nov 1890	Australian AC, Darlinghurst, New South Wales, Australia	Retained world featherweight title
110	Draw	70–1–36 (3)	Chiddy Ryan	NWS	4	28 Oct 1890	Sydney Amateur Gymnastic Club, Sydney, New South Wales, Australia	
109	Win	70–1–35 (3)	Jack Bateman	NWS	4	18 Oct 1890	California Athletic Club, Sydney, New South Wales, Australia	
108	Win	69–1–35 (3)	Sandy Ross	NWS	4	4 Oct 1890	California Athletic Club, Sydney, New South Wales, Australia	
107	Win	68–1–35 (3)	Billy Williams	NWS	4	26 Sep 1890	Melbourne Athletic Club, Melbourne, Victoria, Australia	
106	Win	67–1–35 (3)	Jack Bateman	NWS	4	18 Sep 1890	California Athletic Club, Sydney, New South Wales, Australia	
105	ND	66–1–35 (3)	Pat McShane	ND	4	9 Sep 1890	Apollo Athletic Hall, Melbourne, Victoria, Australia	
104	Win	66–1–35 (2)	Jack King	NWS	4	8 Sep 1890	Apollo Athletic Hall, Melbourne, Victoria, Australia	
103	Win	65–1–35 (2)	Torpedo Billy Murphy	RTD	15 (?)	2 Sep 1890	Sydney Amateur Gymnastic Club, Sydney, New South Wales, Australia	Won world featherweight title
102	Win	64–1–35 (2)	Chiddy Ryan	NWS	4	19 Jul 1890	California Athletic Club, Sydney, New South Wales, Australia	
101	Win	63–1–35 (2)	Sandy Ross	KO	4 (4)	7 Jul 1890	Sydney Amateur Gymnastic Club, Sydney, New South Wales, Australia	
100	Win	62–1–35 (2)	Joe McLeod	KO	2 (15)	11 Jun 1890	Foley's Hall, Sydney, New South Wales, Australia	
99	Draw	61–1–35 (2)	Abe Willis	NWS	4	7 Jun 1890	Foley's Hall, Sydney, New South Wales, Australia	
98	Win	61–1–34 (2)	Doss Patterson	KO	2 (?)	31 May 1890	Foley's Hall, Sydney, New South Wales, Australia	A finish fight
97	Win	60–1–34 (2)	Richard Deerfoot Rose	RTD	2 (4)	17 May 1890	Foley's Hall, Sydney, New South Wales, Australia	
96	Draw	59–1–34 (2)	Chiddy Ryan	NWS	4	17 May 1890	Foley's Hall, Sydney, New South Wales, Australia	
95	Win	59–1–33 (2)	Jim Burge	NWS	4	10 May 1890	Foley's Hall, Sydney, New South Wales, Australia	
94	Draw	58–1–33 (2)	Porter	NWS	4	28 Apr 1890	Sydney Amateur Athletic Club, Sydney, New South Wales, Australia	
93	Draw	58–1–32 (2)	George McKenzie	NWS	6	19 Apr 1890	Foley's Hall, Sydney, New South Wales, Australia	
92	Draw	58–1–31 (2)	Chiddy Ryan	NWS	4	11 Apr 1890	Foley's Hall, Sydney, New South Wales, Australia	
91	Draw	58–1–30 (2)	Young Fred Smith	NWS	6	5 Apr 1890	Foley's Hall, Sydney, New South Wales, Australia	
90	Win	58–1–29 (2)	Young Fred Smith	RTD	2 (6)	5 Apr 1890	Foley's Hall, Sydney, New South Wales, Australia	
89	Draw	57–1–29 (2)	Chiddy Ryan	NWS	4	29 Mar 1890	Foley's Hall, Sydney, New South Wales, Australia	
88	Win	57–1–28 (2)	Harry Mason	KO	2 (4)	22 Mar 1890	Foley's Hall, Sydney, New South Wales, Australia	
87	Win	56–1–28 (2)	Dallas	NWS	4	22 Mar 1890	Foley's Hall, Sydney, New South Wales, Australia	
86	Win	55–1–28 (2)	Duneef	KO	3 (8)	15 Mar 1890	Foley's Hall, Sydney, New South Wales, Australia	
85	Draw	54–1–28 (2)	Chiddy Ryan	NWS	4	3 Mar 1890	Sydney Gymnastic Club, Sydney, New South Wales, Australia	
84	Win	54–1–27 (2)	Midnight Godfrey	RTD	4 (12)	1 Mar 1890	Foley's Hall, Sydney, New South Wales, Australia	
83	Win	53–1–27 (2)	George McKenzie	PTS	15	17 Feb 1890	Foley's Hall, Sydney, New South Wales, Australia	Retained Australian featherweight title
82	Draw	52–1–27 (2)	Chiddy Ryan	NWS	4	11 Feb 1890	Foley's Hall, Sydney, New South Wales, Australia	
81	Draw	52–1–26 (2)	Unknown	NWS	4	1 Feb 1890	Foley's Hall, Sydney, New South Wales, Australia	
80	Draw	52–1–25 (2)	Abe Willis	NWS	4	24 Jan 1890	Foley's Hall, Sydney, New South Wales, Australia	
79	Win	52–1–24 (2)	Bill Horner	NWS	4	18 Jan 1890	Foley's Hall, Sydney, New South Wales, Australia	
78	Win	51–1–24 (2)	Abe Willis	RTD	3 (20)	11 Jan 1890	Foley's Hall, Sydney, New South Wales, Australia	Retained Australian featherweight title
77	Win	50–1–24 (2)	Will Brummy Fuller	NWS	4	4 Jan 1890	Foley's Hall, Sydney, New South Wales, Australia	
76	Win	49–1–24 (2)	Nipper Peakes	PTS	8	26 Dec 1889	Apollo Athletic Hall, Melbourne, Victoria, Australia	Won Australian featherweight title
75	Draw	48–1–24 (2)	Young Pluto	PTS	70 (?)	12 Dec 1889	Melbourne Athletic Club, Melbourne, Victoria, Australia	A finish fight; 70 rounds-Fight commenced at 8.45 pm and finished at 2.00 am
74	Draw	48–1–23 (2)	Martin Denny	NWS	4	26 Nov 1889	Foley's Hall, Sydney, New South Wales, Australia	
73	Win	48–1–22 (2)	Jem Dempsey	RTD	12 (30)	18 Nov 1889	Foley's Hall, Sydney, New South Wales, Australia	
72	Win	47–1–22 (2)	Dave Lewis	KO	3 (4)	12 Nov 1889	Foley's Hall, Sydney, New South Wales, Australia	
71	Win	46–1–22 (2)	Bill Holden	NWS	4	9 Nov 1889	Foley's Hall, Sydney, New South Wales, Australia	
70	Win	45–1–22 (2)	Mick McCarthy	NWS	4	26 Oct 1889	Foley's Hall, Sydney, New South Wales, Australia	
69	Win	44–1–22 (2)	Will Sullivan	RTD	6 (20)	12 Oct 1889	Foley's Hall, Sydney, New South Wales, Australia	
68	Win	43–1–22 (2)	Bill Horner	NWS	4	28 Sep 1889	Foley's Hall, Sydney, New South Wales, Australia	
67	Win	42–1–22 (2)	Dodger Ryan	PTS	6	21 Sep 1889	Foley's Hall, Sydney, New South Wales, Australia	
66	Win	41–1–22 (2)	Bill Horner	NWS	4	14 Sep 1889	Foley's Hall, Sydney, New South Wales, Australia	
65	Draw	40–1–22 (2)	Bill Horner	NWS	4	31 Aug 1889	Foley's Hall, Sydney, New South Wales, Australia	
64	Draw	40–1–21 (2)	Abe Willis	NWS	4	24 Aug 1889	Foley's Hall, Sydney, New South Wales, Australia	
63	Win	40–1–20 (2)	Doss Patterson	KO	4 (15)	17 Aug 1889	Foley's Hall, Sydney, New South Wales, Australia	
62	Win	39–1–20 (2)	Unknown	NWS	4	10 Aug 1889	Foley's Hall, Sydney, New South Wales, Australia	
61	Win	38–1–20 (2)	Duneef	NWS	3	5 Aug 1889	Foley's Hall, Sydney, New South Wales, Australia	
60	Draw	37–1–20 (2)	Abe Willis	PTS	20	27 Jul 1889	Foley's Hall, Sydney, New South Wales, Australia	
59	Draw	37–1–19 (2)	Mick McCarthy	NWS	4	13 Jul 1889	Foley's Hall, Sydney, New South Wales, Australia	
58	Win	37–1–18 (2)	Mick O'Brien	NWS	4	6 Jul 1889	Foley's Hall, Sydney, New South Wales, Australia	
57	Win	36–1–18 (2)	Mick O'Brien	NWS	4	29 Jun 1889	Foley's Hall, Sydney, New South Wales, Australia	
56	Win	35–1–18 (2)	Kiama Pet	RTD	2 (4)	15 Jun 1889	Foley's Hall, Sydney, New South Wales, Australia	
55	Draw	34–1–18 (2)	Mick McCarthy	NWS	4	10 Jun 1889	Foley's Hall, Sydney, New South Wales, Australia	
54	Win	34–1–17 (2)	Alf Lane	RTD	2 (8)	6 Jun 1889	Foley's Hall, Sydney, New South Wales, Australia	
53	Win	33–1–17 (2)	Bill Holden	RTD	14 (15)	24 May 1889	Foley's Hall, Sydney, New South Wales, Australia	
52	Win	32–1–17 (2)	Mick McCarthy	NWS	4	20 May 1889	Foley's Hall, Sydney, New South Wales, Australia	
51	Win	31–1–17 (2)	Bill Holden	NWS	4	4 May 1889	Foley's Hall, Sydney, New South Wales, Australia	
50	Win	30–1–17 (2)	Mick O'Brien	NWS	4	27 Apr 1889	Foley's Hall, Sydney, New South Wales, Australia	
49	Win	29–1–17 (2)	Mick McCarthy	NWS	4	22 Apr 1889	Foley's Hall, Sydney, New South Wales, Australia	
48	Draw	28–1–17 (2)	Horden	NWS	4	20 Apr 1889	Foley's Hall, Sydney, New South Wales, Australia	
47	Draw	28–1–16 (2)	Mick O'Brien	PTS	8	16 Apr 1889	Foley's Hall, Sydney, New South Wales, Australia	
46	Win	28–1–15 (2)	Bill Horner	NWS	4	6 Apr 1889	Foley's Hall, Sydney, New South Wales, Australia	
45	Win	27–1–15 (2)	Mick O'Brien	PTS	8	27 Mar 1889	Foley's Hall, Sydney, New South Wales, Australia	
44	Win	26–1–15 (2)	Jack Adamson	NWS	3	2 Mar 1889	Foley's Hall, Sydney, New South Wales, Australia	
43	Draw	25–1–15 (2)	Ambrose Taylor	PTS	8	2 Feb 1889	Foley's Hall, Sydney, New South Wales, Australia	
42	Win	25–1–14 (2)	Bill Doolan	NWS	4	19 Jan 1889	Foley's Hall, Sydney, New South Wales, Australia	
41	Win	24–1–14 (2)	Dick Murphy	RTD	2 (4)	12 Jan 1889	Foley's White Horse Gym, Sydney, New South Wales, Australia	
40	Win	23–1–14 (2)	Matt Ritchie	NWS	4	15 Dec 1888	Hibernian Hall, Melbourne, Victoria, Australia	
39	Win	22–1–14 (2)	Torpedo Billy Murphy	PTS	4	10 Dec 1888	Hibernian Hall, Melbourne, Victoria, Australia	
38	Draw	21–1–14 (2)	Frank Burns	NWS	4	1 Dec 1888	Hibernian Hall, Melbourne, Victoria, Australia	
37	Draw	21–1–13 (2)	Jones	NWS	4	26 Nov 1888	Hibernian Hall, Melbourne, Victoria, Australia	
36	Win	21–1–12 (2)	Frank Young McShane	PTS	4	17 Nov 1888	Hibernian Hall, Melbourne, Victoria, Australia	
35	Draw	20–1–12 (2)	Young Pluto	NWS	3	3 Nov 1888	Hibernian Hall, Melbourne, Victoria, Australia	
34	Win	20–1–11 (2)	Frank Young McShane	NWS	4	20 Oct 1888	Apollo Athletic Hall, Melbourne, Victoria, Australia	
33	Draw	19–1–11 (2)	Alf Lawrence	PTS	8	22 Sep 1888	Apollo Athletic Hall, Melbourne, Victoria, Australia	
32	Win	19–1–10 (2)	Dick Cook	PTS	6	20 Sep 1888	Centennial Hippodrome, Melbourne, Victoria, Australia	
31	Win	18–1–10 (2)	Sam McLeod	PTS	6	20 Sep 1888	Centennial Hippodrome, Melbourne, Victoria, Australia	
30	Win	17–1–10 (2)	George Fogg	PTS	6	20 Sep 1888	Centennial Hippodrome, Melbourne, Victoria, Australia	
29	Win	16–1–10 (2)	Dick Corbett	PTS	6	19 Sep 1888	Centennial Hippodrome, Melbourne, Victoria, Australia	
28	Win	15–1–10 (2)	Frank Young McShane	NWS	4	15 Sep 1888	Apollo Athletic Hall, Melbourne, Victoria, Australia	
27	Draw	14–1–10 (2)	Frank Young McShane	PTS	8	8 Sep 1888	Apollo Athletic Hall, Melbourne, Victoria, Australia	
26	Win	14–1–9 (2)	Young Pluto	NWS	4	1 Sep 1888	Apollo Athletic Hall, Melbourne, Victoria, Australia	
25	Win	13–1–9 (2)	Young Dalley	NWS	4	25 Aug 1888	Apollo Athletic Hall, Melbourne, Victoria, Australia	
24	Win	12–1–9 (2)	Chappie Chapman	KO	4 (6)	23 Aug 1888	Roachock's Hall, Adelaide, South Australia, Australia	
23	Win	11–1–9 (2)	Jack Smith	PTS	4	8 Aug 1888	Roachock's Hall, Adelaide, South Australia, Australia	
22	Draw	10–1–9 (2)	Michis	NWS	4	9 Jul 1888	Hibernian Hall, Melbourne, Victoria, Australia	
21	Win	10–1–8 (2)	Young Dutchy	KO	4 (8)	2 Jul 1888	Boland's Athletic Hall, Melbourne, Victoria, Australia	
20	Draw	9–1–8 (2)	Young Pluto	PTS	13 (?)	6 Jun 1888	Victor's Athletic Hall, Melbourne, Victoria, Australia	
19	Draw	9–1–7 (2)	Young Pluto	PTS	19 (?)	25 May 1888	Open Field, Lilydale, Melbourne, Victoria, Australia	A finish fight
18	Draw	9–1–6 (2)	Matt Ritchie	PTS	8	19 May 1888	Apollo Athletic Hall, Melbourne, Victoria, Australia	
17	Draw	9–1–5 (2)	Jack King	NWS	4	5 May 1888	Apollo Athletic Hall, Melbourne, Victoria, Australia	
16	Draw	9–1–4 (2)	Young Pluto	PTS	8	30 Apr 1888	Victor's Athletic Hall, Melbourne, Victoria, Australia	Possibly a prearranged draw
15	Win	9–1–3 (2)	Essy McGuire	KO	10 (?)	5 Apr 1888	Foley's Hall, Sydney, New South Wales, Australia	
14	Win	8–1–3 (2)	Jack Heaney	PTS	4	24 Mar 1888	Foley's Hall, Sydney, New South Wales, Australia	
13	Loss	7–1–3 (2)	Bill Oates	PTS	6	17 Mar 1888	Foley's Hall, Sydney, New South Wales, Australia	
12	Draw	7–0–3 (2)	Jim Donnelly	NWS	4	3 Mar 1888	Foley's Hall, Sydney, New South Wales, Australia	
11	Win	7–0–2 (2)	Jack Poultney	NWS	4	29 Feb 1888	Foley's Hall, Sydney, New South Wales, Australia	
10	Win	6–0–2 (2)	Jim Donnelly	NWS	4	25 Feb 1888	Foley's Hall, Sydney, New South Wales, Australia	
9	Draw	5–0–2 (2)	Arthur Aitken	NWS	3	4 Feb 1888	Foley's Hall, Sydney, New South Wales, Australia	
8	Draw	5–0–1 (2)	Flemming	NWS	4	14 Jan 1888	Foley's Hall, Sydney, New South Wales, Australia	
7	ND	5–0 (2)	Binks	ND	4	10 Jan 1888	Foley's Hall, Sydney, New South Wales, Australia	
6	Win	5–0 (1)	Bob O'Neill	PTS	15	1 Mar 1887	Sydney, New South Wales, Australia	Date uncertain
5	Win	4–0 (1)	Ben Francis	KO	7 (?)	1 Feb 1887	Sydney, New South Wales, Australia	Date uncertain
4	Win	3–0 (1)	Tom Whalen	KO	10 (?)	1 Jan 1887	Foley's Hall, Sydney, New South Wales, Australia	Date uncertain
3	Win	2–0 (1)	Frank Silver	KO	49 (?)	1 Mar 1886	Sydney, New South Wales, Australia	Date uncertain
2	Win	1–0 (1)	Bill Griffiths	KO	3 (?)	2 Feb 1886	The Green, Dawes Point, Sydney, New South Wales, Australia	Date uncertain
1	ND	0–0 (1)	Bill Scott	ND	4	1 Jan 1886	Sydney, New South Wales, Australia	Date uncertain

== Boxing achievements ==
Achievements
Preceded by Torpedo Billy Murphy	World Featherweight Champion; 2 September 1890 – 1892; Vacated	Vacant Title next held by George Dixon
