= Dutch oven (disambiguation) =

A Dutch oven is a kind of cooking pot.

Dutch oven may also refer to:

- Dutch Oven (horse), a thoroughbred racehorse and winner of 1882 St. Leger Stakes
- Dutch Oven, a pillar in Montana
- Dutch oven, the protective cover for electrical contacts on a railway coupler; particularly, but not exclusively, used on the London Underground
- Dutch oven (practical joke), flatulating on someone and pulling a blanket or cover over their head, based on a slang phrase describing the mechanics of the cooking pot of the same name
- The Dutch Oven, Union College's satirical newspaper
- Dutch Oven, a nickname for Derek Holland, pitcher for Major League Baseball's San Francisco Giants
- Dutch oven (furnace), an extension to a traditional boiler that helps burn low-quality or high-moisture fuel.
