= Dutching =

In gambling, betting on more than one outcome

In gambling, Dutching is sharing the risk of losing across a number of runners by backing more than one selection in a race or event. One needs to calculate the correct stake to place on each selection so that the return is the same if any of them wins. Although not foolproof, because handicapping is still involved, there have been successful bettors throughout history who have applied this system. This is not to be confused with what constitutes a Dutch book which is when a bookmaker goes overbroke (the opposite to overround).

It is thought the strategy behind Dutching was originally conceived and employed by Arthur Flegenheimer (also known as Dutch Schultz) alongside various rackets he had running at the racetrack. The system has since taken his name.

The strategy can pay dividends when gamblers successfully reduce the potential winners of an event to a select few from the field or when information about runners not expected to perform well does not reach the market (so as to affect the odds), making it profitable to back the rest of the field.

Dutching can also be used to reduce the price of the commission you would pay at a betting exchange by dutching at two bookmakers (normally Asian style) instead.

== Profitability ==
A Dutch or an arb is profitable if the sum of the reciprocals of the decimal odds of each selection is less than 1, and each bet is sized such that the payout in each outcome are the same.

Additionally, the profitability of a Dutch/arb can be expressed as 1-R, where R is the sum of the reciprocals.

In practice, bookmakers will always ensure that R is comfortably greater than 1, to generate a profit for themselves and to negate the effect of any slight arbitrage possibilities between different bookmakers.

== Worked examples ==
The simplest form of market to Dutch is two-way, such as a tennis match or the number of goals scored in a game of football, but any number of runners can be dutched. These examples are based on betting on goals scored in a football game.

=== Example 1 - an unprofitable two-way arbitrage ===
- Over 2.5 - odds of 2.1 at Bookmaker 1 (i.e. 11–10 against)
- Under 2.5 - odds of 1.8 at Bookmaker 2 (i.e. 5–4 on)

$$\begin{aligned}
\text{Sum of Reciprocals} &= \frac{1}{\text{Decimal Odds at Bookmaker 1}} + \frac{1}{\text{Decimal Odds at Bookmaker 2}} \\
&= \frac{1}{2.1} + \frac{1}{1.8} = 0.476 + 0.556 = 1.032
\end{aligned}$$

This would give a loss of $1 - 1.032 = -0.032 = -3.2\%$, so the odds are not profitable.

=== Example 2 - a profitable two-way arbitrage ===
In the same situation as above, another bookmaker (Bookmaker 3) is offering odds of 1.95 on the Under 2.5 outcome (unlikely).

- Over 2.5 - odds of 2.1 at Bookmaker 1
- Under 2.5 - odds of 1.95 at Bookmaker 3

$$\begin{aligned}
\text{Sum of Reciprocals} &= \frac{1}{\text{Decimal Odds at Bookmaker 1}} + \frac{1}{\text{Decimal Odds at Bookmaker 3}} \\
&= \frac{1}{2.1} + \frac{1}{1.95} = 0.476 + 0.513 = 0.989
\end{aligned}$$

Therefore, this would give a profit of $1 - 0.989 = 0.011 = +1.1\%$ on the total stakes. In this instance, betting $100 on Over 2.5 and $100$\times \frac{2.1}{1.95}=$$107.69 on Under 2.5 would cost you $207.69. If Over 2.5 wins, you are awarded $100$\times 2.1=$$210, while if Under 2.5 wins you are also awarded $107.69$\times 1.95\approx$ $210, resulting in a guaranteed profit of $210 - $207.69 = $2.31.

== See also ==
- Arbitrage betting
- Dutch book
- Hedge (finance)
