= Dutch (company) =

American veterinary telemedicine company

- Company type: Private
- Industry: Veterinary medicine, Telehealth
- Founded: February 2021; 4 years ago
- Founder: Joe Spector
- Headquarters: Oakland, California, U.S.
- Area served: United States
- Key people: Joe Spector (CEO); Abel Gonzalez (Clinical Director)
- Services: Veterinary telemedicine; Prescription services; At-home diagnostics
- Website: www.dutch.com

Dutch is an American veterinary telehealth company headquartered in Oakland, California. Founded in 2021 by Joe Spector, the company provides video consultations and, where permitted by state law, prescriptions for common conditions in dogs and cats.

== History ==
Dutch was founded in February 2021 by Joe Spector, a co-founder of the human telemedicine company Hims & Hers. The company was established to address challenges in accessing veterinary care, inspired by Spector's experience as a pet owner during the COVID-19 pandemic and his brother's struggle with his dog's anxiety. Dutch launched services in July 2021 in eight states and expanded nationwide by early 2022. It raised $5 million in a seed funding round from Forerunner Ventures, Bling Capital, Trust Ventures, and Jimmy Fallon, followed by a $20 million Series A round in February 2022 led by Forerunner Ventures and Eclipse Ventures. In 2022, Dutch reduced its marketing budget and shifted focus to search engine optimization in response to economic conditions. In 2025, Dutch expanded its marketing efforts with connected TV advertising campaigns.

== Operations ==
Dutch provides video consultations for non-emergency conditions such as allergies, anxiety, ear infections, and urinary tract infections, with assessments based on owner descriptions, medical history, and visual evaluations. The company offers prescription services in 34 states, subject to state-specific veterinary-client-patient relationship (VCPR) regulations, and provides at-home diagnostic kits for conditions requiring further analysis. For emergencies or conditions requiring physical exams, imaging, or surgery, Dutch refers pets to in-person veterinary clinics, including Petco’s Vetco Clinics, and collaborates with pharmacies like PetMeds for prescription fulfillment. The company offers subscription plans. All veterinarians are licensed in the pet owner’s state to comply with VCPR regulations.

== Regulatory Challenges ==
Dutch’s services vary by state law: it provides video consultations nationwide but offers prescription services only in 34 states where permitted. As of April 2025, Fast Company reported Dutch had veterinarians in all 50 U.S. states but could prescribe in 34 states. According to coverage of Dutch’s 2025 ‘State of Online Veterinary Care’ report, about 38% of Americans (≈129 million) live in ‘veterinary deserts’; the report projects roughly 20% of veterinary visits will be virtual by 2030. Legal changes in states like Texas, Louisiana, and Mississippi have enabled Dutch to expand prescription services in those regions.

== See also ==
- Telehealth
- Veterinary medicine in the United States
- Veterinary medicine
