= Deutscher =

Deutscher is a German surname. Notable people with the surname include:

- Alma Deutscher, British musician and composer
- Drafi Deutscher, German singer and composer
- Guy Deutscher (linguist)
- Guy Deutscher (physicist)
- Isaac Deutscher, British journalist, historian and political activist
- Tamara Deutscher, British writer and editor

== Fictional characters ==
- Deutscher, a character in the short story "A Sound of Thunder" by Ray Bradbury

== See also ==
- Deucher, Ohio
