= Dutch, the magazine =

- Editor: Tom Bijvoet
- Categories: Special interest magazine
- Frequency: Bi-monthly
- Circulation: 6000
- First issue: August 2011
- Company: Mokeham Publishing Inc
- Country: Canada
- Based in: Oakville
- Language: English
- Website: http://www.dutchthemag.com
- ISSN: 1927-1492

Dutch, the Magazine is a bi-monthly Canadian magazine about The Netherlands and its people. It covers issues like society, politics, culture, history, food and travel. It covers the Netherlands and its inhabitants and Dutch settlements abroad, especially in North America. The magazine was launched in August 2011 with an initial circulation of 2,500 in Canada and the USA. Contributors include Tom Bijvoet the editor of Maandblad de Krant, Brian Bramson author of a satirical book about life in the Netherlands and Jesse van Muylwijck, prize winning Dutch comic strip artist.
