= Dutch boy =

Dutch boy or Dutch Boy may refer to:

- The Little Dutch Boy, a boy who plugs a dike with his finger, featured in the novel Hans Brinker, or The Silver Skates by Mary Mapes Dodge
- Dutch Boy Paint, a US brand of paint, and its logo featuring a "Dutch boy" (i.e. a boy in traditional, old-fashioned Dutch clothing)
- "Dutch Boy", the weather satellite system in the film Geostorm, named after the boy in the Mary Mapes Dodge novel
- "Dutch Boy", one of multiple nicknames of the character Holland Wagenbach in the American police drama television series The Shield
- Slang for a man with many lesbian friends.

== See also ==
- Dutch Boyd
- Dutch Bros.
