= Dutchman, West Virginia =

Unincorporated community in West Virginia, United States

Dutchman
- Unincorporated community
- Location within the state of West Virginia Dutchman (the United States)
- Coordinates: 39°3′38″N 81°9′54″W
- Country: United States
- State: West Virginia
- County: Ritchie
- Elevation: 715 ft (218 m)
- Time zone: UTC-5 (Eastern (EST))
  - Summer (DST): UTC-4 (EDT)
- GNIS ID: 1554341

Dutchman is an unincorporated community in Ritchie County, West Virginia, United States.
