= Dutch Open =

Dutch Open may refer to:

- Dutch Open (tennis), an ATP tennis tournament from 1957 to 2008
- Dutch Open (golf), an annual golf tournament on the European Tour
- Dutch Open (badminton), an annual badminton tournament held since 1931
- Dutch Open (darts)
