= Dutch, West Virginia =

Unincorporated community in West Virginia, US

Coordinates: 38°48′18″N 80°37′05″W

Dutch is an unincorporated community in Braxton County, in the U.S. state of West Virginia.

== History ==
A post office called Dutch was established in 1913, and remained in operation until 1943. the community was named after Bailus "Dutch" Allen, the father of an early postmaster.
