= Dutch Hill (Herkimer County, New York) =

Mountain in New York, United States

- Location within New York Location within the United States

Highest point
- Elevation: 1,043 feet (318 m)
- Coordinates: 43°03′37″N 75°07′38″W

Geography
- Location: WNW of Frankfort, New York, U.S.
- Topo map: USGS Utica East

Dutch Hill is a mountain located in Central New York Region of New York located in the Town of Frankfort in Herkimer County, west-northwest of Frankfort.
