= Double Dutch =

Double Dutch may refer to:

- Double Dutch (jump rope), a skipping game
- Double Dutch (writing style), used by John O'Mill
- Double Dutch (novel), by Sharon Draper, 2002
- Double Dutch (DJ Sharpnel album), by DJ Sharpnel, 1998
- Double Dutch (The Eames Era album), by the Eames Era, 2005
- "Double Dutch" (song), by Malcolm McLaren, 1983
- Double Dutch, a variety of Girl Scouts Cookies
- "Double dutch", a slang term for preventing unwanted pregnancy by wearing a condom while also taking contraceptives

== See also ==
- Gibberish, speech that is or appears to be nonsense
- -izzle, a slang suffix to form hip-hop-sounding words
- Language game
  - Ubbi dubbi
- "Double Dutch Bus", a 1980 song by Frankie Smith
