= SMS Deutschland =

SMS Deutschland may refer to one of the following ships in the German Empire's Kaiserliche Marine:

- SMS Deutschland (1874), an armored frigate commissioned in 1875
- SMS Deutschland (1904), a battleship launched in 1904
- SMS Deutschland (1914), an auxiliary mine layer commissioned in 1914

== See also ==
- Deutschland (disambiguation)
- Deutschland-class battleship
