= German training cruiser Deutschland =

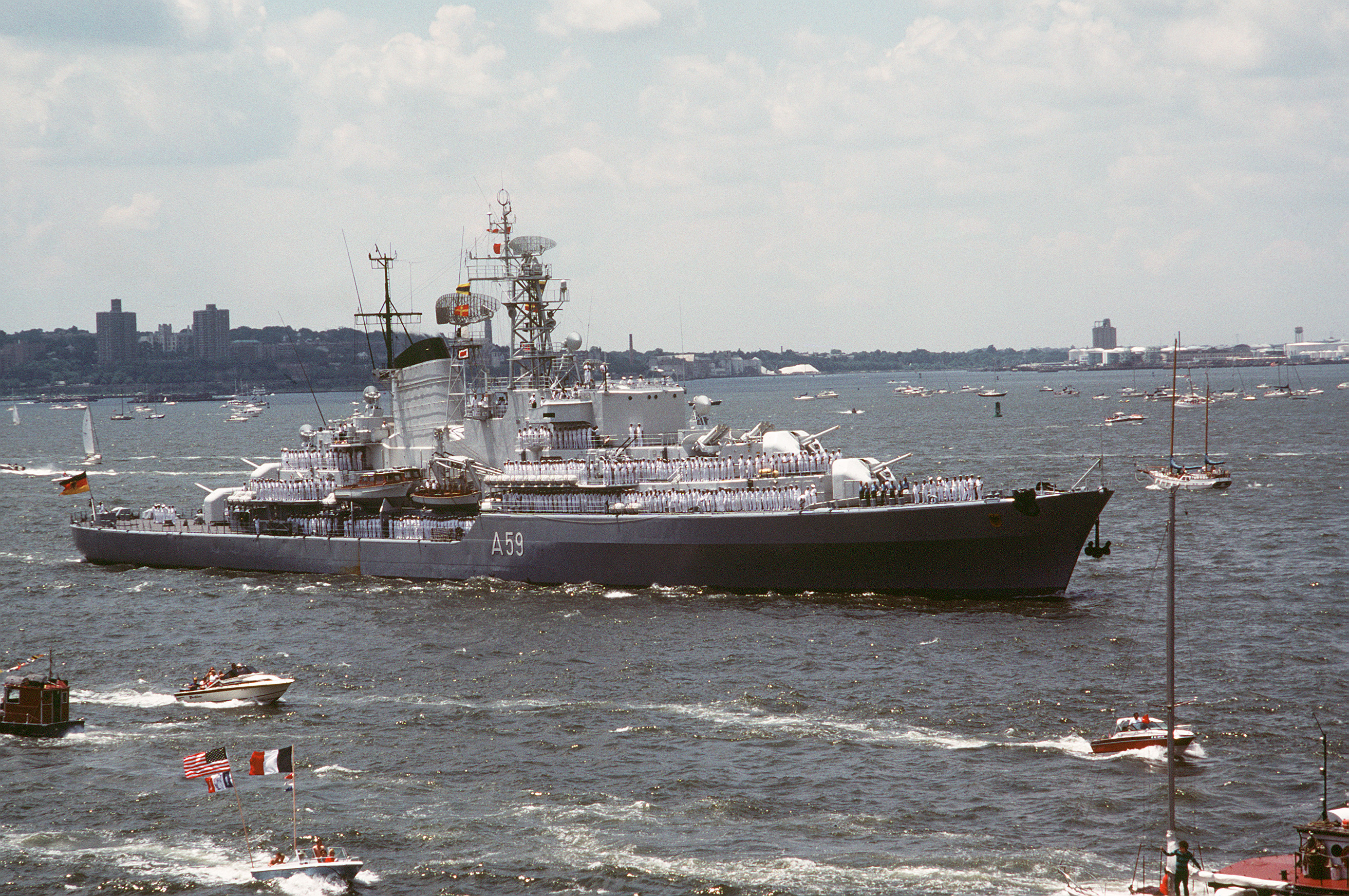
- Deutschland (A59) in New York City harbor

History

West Germany
- Name: Deutschland
- Ordered: 1958
- Builder: Nobiskrug, Rendsburg
- Laid down: 11 September 1959
- Launched: 5 November 1960
- Acquired: 10 April 1963
- Commissioned: 25 May 1966
- Decommissioned: 28 June 1990
- Fate: Sold for scrap, October 1993

General characteristics
- Class & type: Type 440 cruiser
- Displacement: 4,880 long tons (4,958 t) standard; 5,684 long tons (5,775 t) full load
- Length: 130 m (426 ft 6 in) w/l; 138.2 m (453 ft 5 in) o/a
- Beam: 16.1 m (52 ft 10 in)
- Draft: 5.1 m (16 ft 9 in)
- Propulsion: CODAD; 2 × Mercedes-Benz and 2 × Maybach diesel engines, all 16-cylinder, 4-stroke (Maybach engines replaced in 1981 with Mercedes-Benz engines), 2 shafts; 2 × Wahodag boilers feeding 1 set of geared Wahodag steam turbines driving center shaft, 16,000 hp (12,000 kW); 3 × 4-bladed Escher-Wyss controllable pitch propellers; 2 rudders; 643 tons of oil and diesel fuel
- Speed: 22 knots (41 km/h; 25 mph)
- Range: 3,800 nmi (7,000 km) at 12 kn (22 km/h; 14 mph)
- Boats & landing craft carried: 3 motor pinnaces; 3 motor cutters; 30 life rafts
- Complement: 172 officers and men, and up to 250 cadets
- Sensors & processing systems: Radar: LW-08, SGR-114, SGR-105, SGR-103, M-45; Sonar ELAC 1BV
- Armament: 4 × METL 53 100 mm/55 main guns (4 × 1); 6 × 40 mm/70 AA guns (2 × 2, 2 × 1); 2 × fixed 533 mm torpedo tubes aft (removed in the mid-1970s); 4 × trainable 533 mm anti-submarine torpedo tubes; 2 × 375 mm Bofors anti-submarine mortars; Mine laying capability
- Notes: 2 cranes; 3 anchors (one aft, two fore)

Deutschland (A59) was a naval ship of the Bundesmarine, the West German Navy. She was constructed and used as a training cruiser ("Schulschiff") in peacetime and planned for multi-role missions in the event of war: troop ship, hospital ship, minelayer, and escort. In order to prepare cadets in the best possible way for their duties in the active fleet, the ship was carrying the type of armament and machinery that was reflecting the equipment fitted to the German Navy ships of that period. Therefore, the machinery was rather diverse (two pairs of different diesel engines and a steam turbine), and performance-wise the emphasis had rather been laid on range than speed. Under deck, comparably large teaching rooms underlined the primary role and, unlike other ships in the fleet, Deutschland had some civilians (captain's steward, shoemaker, tailor) serving alongside military personnel.

In her time Deutschland was the largest vessel in the navy of the Federal Republic of Germany. Permission to build the ship was granted despite being larger than allowed by tonnage restrictions imposed by the WEU on West Germany. (The later Berlin class replenishment ships of the reunited Germany are much larger.) Like most German post-war naval ships she was completely NBC protected. Deutschland was the smallest German cruiser since the 4,385-ton SMS Brummer and Bremse of 1915.

This one-ship class, Type 440 of the German designation system, cost 95 million DM.

== Service career and fate ==
Ordered in late 1958, the training ship Deutschland was laid down at Nobiskrug shipyard in Rendsburg on 11 September 1959. Launched on 5 November 1960, it was originally intended to name the Federal German Navy's training ship Berlin. For obvious political reasons however (Germany and Berlin being divided and the latter existing under the four power status, and the allies objecting the name chosen), the plan was abandoned and the ship eventually named after the German nation - "Deutschland" for Germany.

Delivered 10 April 1963, Deutschland was commissioned on 25 May 1966 and, like the sail training ship Gorch Fock, attached to the Naval Academy Mürwik in Flensburg-Mürwik. During her active service, thousands of cadets of the post-war West German navy completed the three-month practical part of their officer's training on board Deutschland. The ship remained in active service until she was decommissioned on 28 June 1990. Notwithstanding the prominent role that the ship had played in the naval officer training of the Bundesmarine from the mid-1960s for nearly 25 years, all attempts to preserve the ship, e.g. as a museum, failed. Deutschland was finally sold for scrap in October 1993, and in January 1994 she was towed to Alang, India to meet her fate.

== Pictures ==
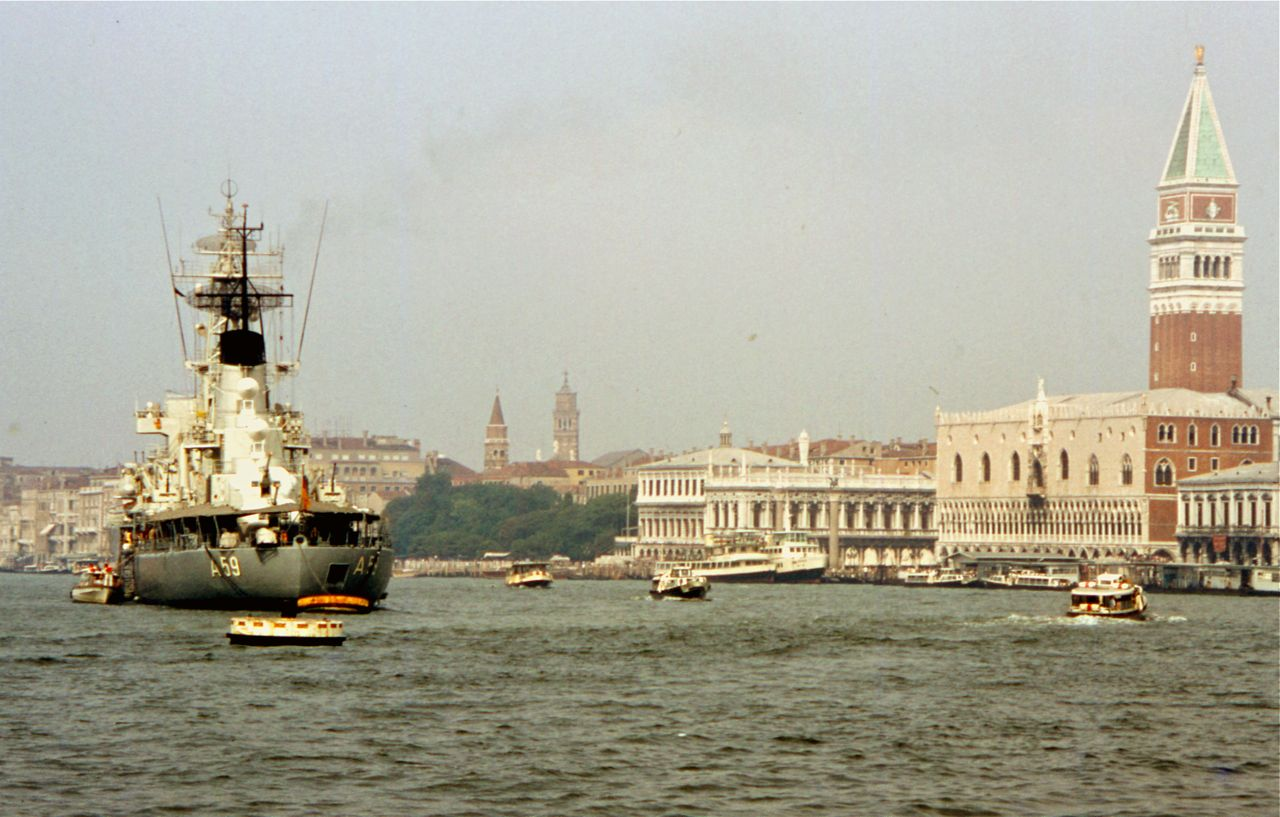
Deutschland (A 59) in Venice during the 54. AAR in August 1980

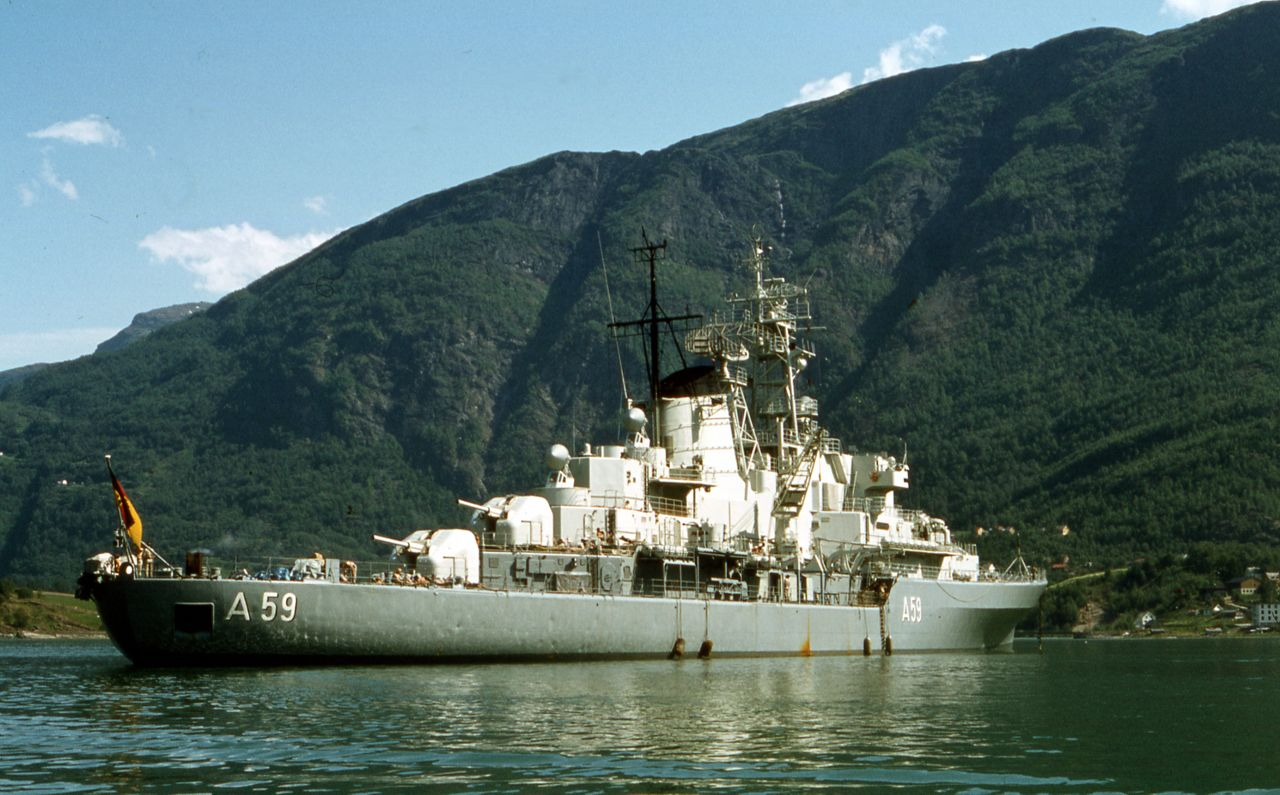
Deutschland (A 59) at anchor in Lustrafjord near Skjolden in June 1980

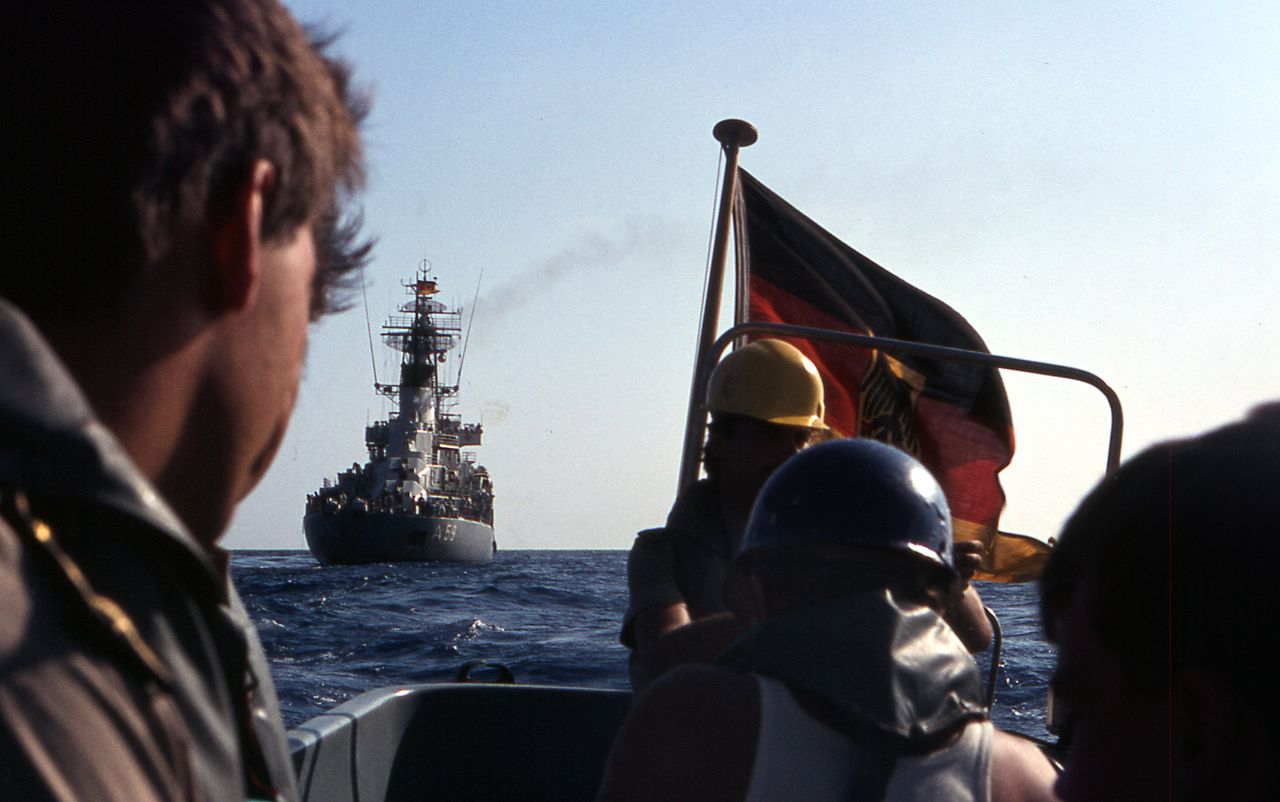
Transfer from Deutschland to Lütjens (D 185) in the Gulf of Sirte in August 1980

== Namesakes in German naval service ==
Prior to the Type 440 class training ship Deutschland, other surface warships in German naval service were carrying the same name.

Imperial German Navy

1.) The ironclad SMS Deutschland, launched in 1874,

2.) The pre-dreadnought battleship SMS Deutschland, launched in 1904

3.) The auxiliary minelayer SMS Deutschland, launched in 1909 as a civilian ship and commissioned in 1914

Kriegsmarine

4.) The pocket-battleship Deutschland, launched in 1931 and renamed Lützow in 1940.
