= German trawler V 403 Deutschland =

History
- Name: Deutschland
- Namesake: Germany
- Owner: Hanseatische Hochseefischerei AG. (1934–39); Kriegsmarine (1939–40)
- Port of registry: (Nazi Germany) Bremerhaven, Germany (1934–39); Kriegsmarine (1939–40)
- Builder: Deschimag Seebeckwerft
- Yard number: 521
- Launched: July 1934
- Completed: 4 August 1934
- Commissioned: 3 September 1939
- Out of service: 5 September 1940
- Identification: Fishing boat registration BX 247 (1934–39); Code Letters DQPY; Pennant Number V 404 (1939); Pennant Number V 403 (1939–40)
- Fate: Struck a mine and sank

General characteristics
- Type: Fishing trawler (1934–39); Vorpostenboot (1939–40)
- Tonnage: 432 GRT, 161 NRT
- Length: 51.35 metres (168 ft 6 in)
- Beam: 8.00 metres (26 ft 3 in)
- Draught: 4.65 metres (15 ft 3 in)
- Depth: 3.74 metres (12 ft 3 in)
- Installed power: Triple expansion steam engine, 95nhp
- Propulsion: Single screw propeller
- Speed: 12 knots (22 km/h)

Deutschland was a German fishing trawler that was requisitioned by the Kriegsmarine in the Second World War for use as a Vorpostenboot. She served as V 404 Deutschland and V 403 Deutschland. She struck a mine and sank off the Dutch coast in August 1940.

== Description ==
Deutschland was 51.35 metres (168 ft 6 in) long, with a beam of 8.00 metres (26 ft 3 in). She had a depth of 3.74 metres (12 ft 3 in) and a draught of 4.65 metres (15 ft 3 in). She was assessed at 432 GRT, 161 NRT. She was powered by a triple expansion steam engine, which had cylinders of 35 centimetres (13 3/4 in), 55 centimetres (21 5/8 in) and 90 centimetres (35 7/16 in) diameter by 65 centimetres (25 9/16 in) stroke. The engine was made by Deschimag Seebeckwerft, Wesermünde, Germany. It was rated at 95nhp. The engine powered a single screw propeller driven via a low pressure turbine and double reduction gearing. It could propel the ship at 12 knots (22 km/h).

== History ==
The ship was built as yard number 521 by Deschimag Seekbeckwerft, Wesermünde for the Hanseatische Hochseefischerei AG, Bremerhaven. She was launched in July 1934 and completed on 4 August. The fishing boat registration BX 247 was allocated. She was allocated the Code Letters DQPY.

Deutschland was requisitioned by the Kriegsmarine on 3 September 1939 for use as a vorpostenboot. She was allocated to 4 Vorpostenflotille as V 404 Deutschland. On 16 October she was redesignated V 403 Deutschland. On 5 September 1940, she struck a mine and sank in the Westerschelde off Vlissingen, Zeeland, Netherlands. Four of her crew were killed.

== Sources ==
- Gröner, Erich (1993). Die deutschen Kriegsschiffe 1815-1945 (in German). Vol. 8/I: Flußfahrzeuge, Ujäger, Vorpostenboote, Hilfsminensucher, Küstenschutzverbände (Teil 1). Koblenz: Bernard & Graefe. ISBN 3-7637-4807-5.
