= Young Dutchy =

British boxer (1853–1911)

Frederick Hansted (1853 – 21 November 1911), known as Young Dutchy, was an English-born boxer who fought in Australia and the United States.

== Biography ==
Born in London, Dutchy began boxing at the age of 16 and fought as a featherweight in Australia, before sailing to America at the age of 30, apparently motivated by a warrant for his arrest. His arrival was delayed by being shipwrecked in Tahiti, where he kept himself busy competing with the local champions.

Upon landing in San Francisco, Dutchy quickly made himself useful in local boxing circles as a capable referee and exponent of the Marquess of Queensberry Rules. The Call noted, "It is said of him that he has displayed more fairness and ability in that line within a few days than has, perhaps, been shown here before in months." Despite that encomium, he was arrested, along with three other participants in a November 1883 bout, on charges of conducting a prizefight, which was illegal there at the time. A trial later that winter saw Dutchy and colleagues go free, and he continued to be active in the boxing venues of late 19th century San Francisco, including the sporting houses of Harry Maynard, Jack Hallinan and Clarence Whistler. He also taught boxing and, in 1885, introduced into San Francisco boxing circles his pupil from Stockton, the African-American boxer Charley Turner, who at the time claimed to be the "middleweight champion colored pugilist of the Coast."

Dutchy later went to Alaska, probably to escape a criminal indictment for defrauding someone's estate, and was a boxing instructor in Fairbanks. For reasons that are unclear, he returned to San Francisco in 1900, surrendering himself to the police and claiming innocence. He spent a year and a half in the County Jail, but was released in 1902 on the grounds of a defective indictment. He died on 21 November 1911.
