= Deutsch =

Deutsch (/dɔɪtʃ/ DOYTCH, German: [dɔʏtʃ]) or Deutsche (/ˈdɔɪtʃə/ DOY-chə, German: [ˈdɔʏtʃə]) most often refers to:

- Deutsch or (das) Deutsche, the German language or in particular Standard German, spoken in central European countries and other places
- Deutsche: Germans, as a weak masculine, feminine, or plural demonym
- Deutsch (word), originally referring to the Germanic vernaculars of the Early Middle Ages

The word may also refer to:

== Businesses and organisations ==
- André Deutsch, an imprint of Carlton Publishing Group
- Deutsch Inc., a former American advertising agency that split in 2020 into:
  - Deutsch NY, a New York City-based advertising agency
- Deutsche Aerospace AG
- Deutsche Akademie, a cultural organisation, superseded by the Goethe-Institut
- Deutsche Bahn, the German railway service
- Deutsche Bank
- Deutsche Börse, a German stock exchange
- Deutsche Geophysikalische Gesellschaft, the German Geophysical Society
- Deutsche Grammophon, a German classical music record label
- Deutsch Group, an international connector manufacturer
- Deutsche Luft Hansa (1926–1945)
- Deutsche Lufthansa (since 1953), an airline
- Deutsche Marine, the German Navy
- Deutsche Luftwaffe, the German Air Force
- Deutsche Post, the German postal service
- Deutsche Telekom, a major German telecommunications company
- Deutsche Welle, Germany's public international broadcaster
- Deutscher Filmpreis, a film awards ceremony
- Verlag Harri Deutsch, a former German publishing house

== Other uses ==
- Deutsch, a village in the German municipality of Groß Garz
- Deutsch (crater), on the far side of the Moon
- Deutsch (surname), shared by several people
- Deutsch catalogue of compositions by Franz Schubert; see Schubert Thematic Catalogue

== See also ==
- Deitsch (disambiguation)
- Deutscher
- Dutch (disambiguation)
- German (disambiguation)
