= Earnse Bay =

Beach in Cumbria, England

Coordinates: 54.1187°N 3.2711°W

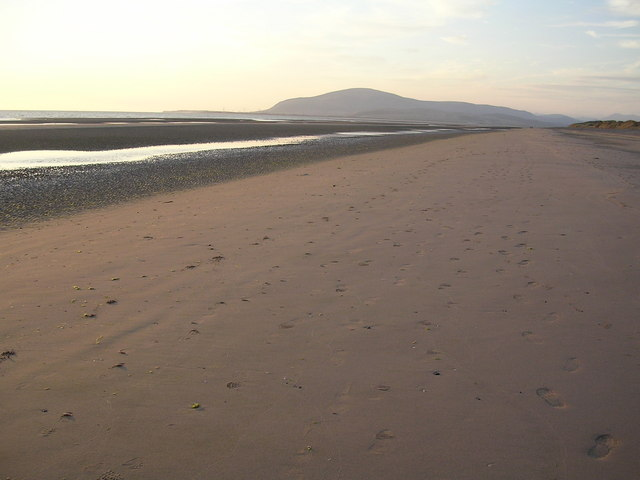
Earnse Bay looking north

Earnse Bay (also known as 'West Shore') is a sand and shingle beach located along the western side of Walney Island, Barrow-in-Furness in Cumbria, England. Along with Sandy Gap and Biggar Bank, Earnse Bay forms a more or less continuous stretch of eight miles of coastline. The beach offers panoramic views of the Irish Sea, the Isle of Man and the Lake District mountains which have only recently been interrupted by the construction of three large wind farms (Barrow Offshore, Ormonde and Walney). Earnse Bay was once planned to be developed into a reputable seaside resort to rival other nearby towns such as Morecambe and Blackpool, however these plans never fully materialised. Despite this, Earnse Bay remains Barrow's most popular beach and is busy with walkers, sunbathers and kitesurfers during the summer months.

Earnse Bay is home to Furness Golf Club, the sixth oldest golf course in England, the North West Kitesurfing surf school and West Shore Park, a residential complex.

A number of regular bus services begin and terminate at Earnse Bay, whilst the beach and Walney itself are accessible via Jubilee Bridge which connects to the Barrow Island area of Barrow on the mainland.

== See also ==
- List of beaches
