= Walney South =

Settlement in Cumbria, England

Coordinates: 54.076°N 3.235°W

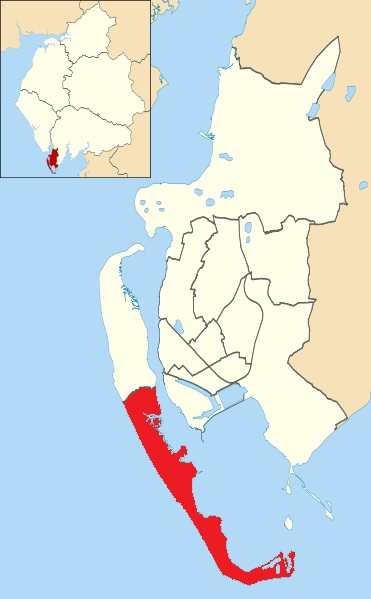
- Walney South shown within Barrow-in-Furness
- Population: 5,307 (2011)
- Unitary authority: Westmorland and Furness
- Ceremonial county: Cumbria
- Region: North West
- Country: England
- Sovereign state: United Kingdom
- Post town: BARROW-IN-FURNESS
- Postcode district: LA
- Dialling code: 01229
- Police: Cumbria
- Fire: Cumbria
- Ambulance: North West
- UK Parliament: Barrow and Furness

Walney South is one of two wards on Walney Island in Westmorland and Furness, Cumbria, England. The 2001 UK census showed 5,784 people were living in the area, reducing to 5,307 at the 2011 Census. There are two main settlements within the ward: Biggar and Vickerstown. Walney Bridge connects Walney South and, in fact, the whole island to mainland Barrow.

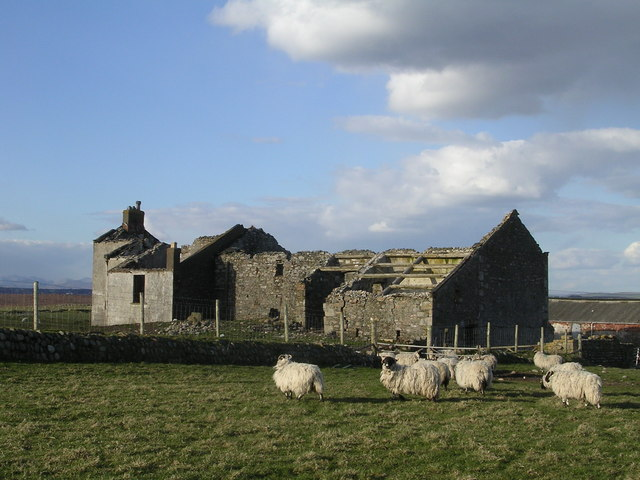
Ruined farm house

Whilst still an electoral ward for Barrow Town Council, the ward was combined at a district/ local authority level with Walney North ward on the 1st of April 2023 following formation of the new Westmorland and Furness Local Authority and be named simply 'Walney Island'.
