= West of Duddon Sands Wind Farm =

Wind farm in the Irish Sea

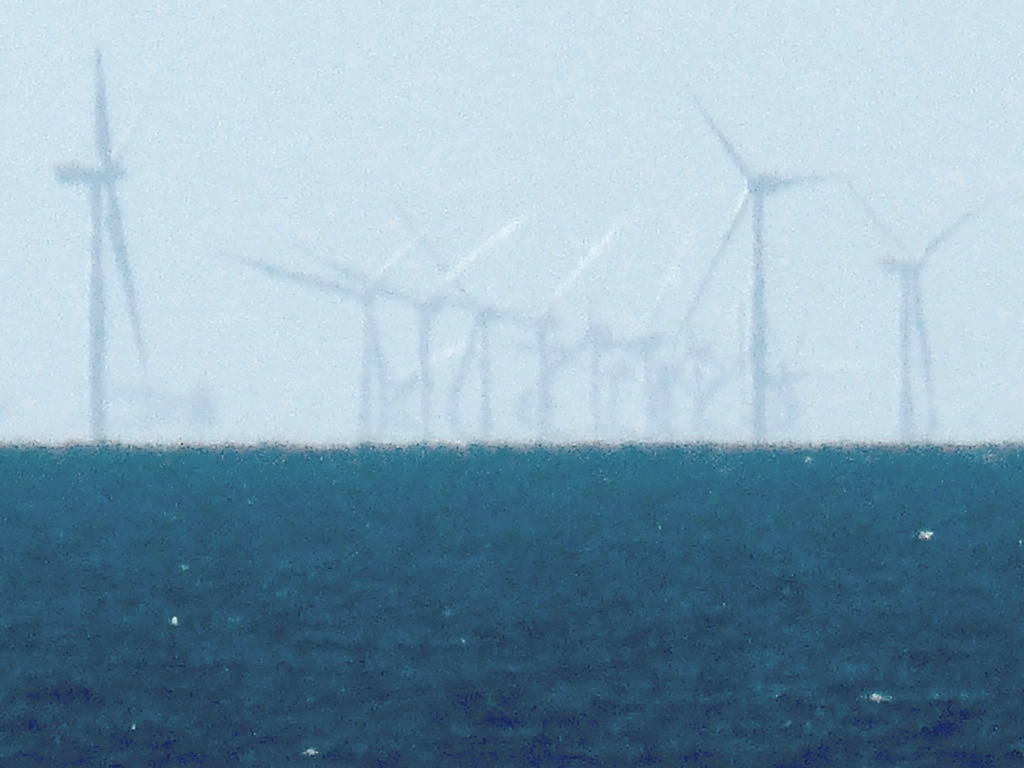
- West of Duddon Sands Wind Farm viewed from Blackpool
- Country: United Kingdom
- Location: 10 Miles south west of Walney Island Cumbria
- Coordinates: 53°59′N 3°28′W
- Status: Operational
- Construction began: May 2013
- Commission date: October 2014
- Construction cost: £1,600 million
- Owners: ScottishPower; Ørsted

Wind farm
- Type: Offshore
- Distance from shore: 14 km (8.7 mi)
- Rotor diameter: 120 m (390 ft)
- Site area: 67 km^{2} (26 sq mi)

Power generation
- Units operational: 108 × 3.6 MW
- Make and model: Siemens Gamesa SWT-3.6-120 (108)
- Nameplate capacity: 389 MW

External links
- Website: westofduddonsands.co.uk
- Commons: Related media on Commons

Wind farm layout

West of Duddon Sands Wind Farm (WoDS), occasionally also known as West Duddon Wind Farm is an offshore wind farm located 14 kilometres (8.7 mi) south west of Walney Island off the coast of Barrow-in-Furness in Cumbria, in the Irish Sea, England. It was developed by Scottish Power and Ørsted A/S.

== Location ==
The wind farm gets its name from a large sand bank uncovered at low water in the mouth of the estuary of the River Duddon to the north of the Furness Peninsula. The farm actually lies to the south west of the Duddon Sands and covers an area of approximately 67 km^{2}.

It is situated in the vicinity of three other wind farms. It is to the south of the Walney Wind Farm and Ormonde Wind Farm, and to the west of the Barrow Offshore Wind Farm.

== Ownership ==
The project to develop the West of Duddon Sands Wind Farm was awarded in December 2003 as part of the Round 2 development programme. The project was awarded to Morecambe Wind Ltd, a partnership between Scottish Power, Elsam, and Eurus Energy. Elsam, a Danish company, was later acquired by DONG Energy. By 2014 the windfarm was stated to be "a joint venture project between ScottishPower Renewables and Dong Energy".

== Planning ==
The project included constructing the wind turbines and their foundations, building offshore substations, installing power cables both undersea and onshore, as well as an extension to the existing onshore Electrical substation to house the equipment needed for connection into the UK National Grid. Cables were supplied by NKT, and are 82 km of 155 kV sea cables and 22 km land cables, at a price of DKK 600 million.

The wind farm planning application was filed in April 2006 and consent was granted in September 2008. The application was for between 83 and 139 turbines with a nameplate capacity of 500 MW. However permission was granted for only 108 turbines due to geological siting issues. This will provide up to 389 MW of power.

== Construction ==
The 108 Siemens Wind Power 3.6 MW geared turbines cost €700 million installed, bringing the cost per turbine to €6.5m, or €1.8m per MW. Adding maintenance, transformator platform and cabling to shore brings the cost to £1.6 billion. A cable was laid by Stemat Spirit, shown in TV documentary Mighty Ships. The project has a 5-year warranty. Electrical work started in 2012, turbines installed in 2013, and operating in 2014.

The wind farm began generating power on 28 January 2014 when four turbines were connected to the grid. The final turbine was installed in June 2014. The wind farm was officially inaugurated by the Secretary of State for Energy and Climate Change, Ed Davey on 30 October 2014.
