= List of tallest buildings and structures in Barrow-in-Furness =

This list of the tallest buildings and structures in Barrow-in-Furness ranks buildings and structures by height.

There are a diverse range of tall structures within the borough, the tallest of which is currently Devonshire Dock Hall, a shipbuilding hall occupied by BAE Systems.

In addition to buildings and structures within Barrow, Ormonde Wind Farm, Walney Wind Farm and the Barrow Offshore Wind Farm form a cluster of wind farms off the coast of Barrow, the tallest turbines of which reach a height of 120m (394ft).

== Completed ==
This lists buildings and structures in Barrow-in-Furness that are at least 30 m (98 ft) tall.

=== On land ===
An equal sign (=) following a rank indicates the same height between two or more buildings.

Rank	Name	Image	Height m (ft)	Floors	Year completed	Primary use	Notes
1	Devonshire Dock Hall		51 (167)	N/A	1986	Industrial	Devonshire Dock Hall is a large indoor shipbuilding and assembly complex that forms part of the BAE Systems shipyard.
2	Barrow-in-Furness Town Hall		50 (164)	6	1886	Government	Barrow-in-Furness Town Hall is a Victorian-era, neo-Gothic municipal building in the central business district of Barrow-in-Furness. The building serves as the base of Barrow Borough Council.
3	St. James' Church		46 (150)	N/A	1869	Religion	St. James Church belongs to the Church of England's Diocese of Carlisle within the ecclesiastical Province of York. The present church building dates from the mid-19th century and is a Grade II listed building.
4	Central Yard Facility		41 (135)	N/A	2018	Industrial	Shipbuilding hall constructed to assist in construction of Vanguard-class submarines
5	Furness Abbey		40 (131)	N/A	1450	Religion	Furness Abbey is a former Catholic monastery dating back to 1123 and was once the second-wealthiest and most powerful Cistercian monastery in the country, behind Fountains Abbey, prior to its dissolution during the English Reformation. The abbey contains a number of individual Grade I Listed Buildings.
6	St Mary of Furness Roman Catholic Church				1888	Church	Tallest Catholic Church spire in Barrow
7	Craven House		34 (112)	7	1967	Office	At 7 floors, Craven House is the tallest office building in Barrow-in-Furness.

=== Off shore ===
An equal sign (=) following a rank indicates the same height between two or more buildings.

Rank	Name	Image	Height m (ft)	Floors	Year completed	Primary use	Notes
1	Walney Wind Farm		120 (394)	N/A	2011	Wind farm	The tallest wind farm turbines located off the Barrow coastline and at a time the world's largest operational offshore wind farm. Hub heights reach 120 metres.
2	Ormonde Wind Farm		100 (328)	N/A	2011	Wind farm	Hub heights reach 100 metres.
3	Barrow Offshore Wind Farm		75 (246)	N/A	2006	Wind farm	Hub heights reach 75 metres.

== Demolished ==
This lists buildings and structures in Barrow-in-Furness that were at least 30 m (98 ft) tall and have since been demolished.

Rank	Name	Image	Height m (ft)	Floors	Year completed	Year demolished	Primary use	Notes
1	Barrow Hematite Steel Company Works			N/A	1867	1980	Steelworks chimneys	
2	Barrow-in-Furness power station			N/A		1960	Concrete cooling tower	
3	Roosecote Power Station		63 (207)	N/A	1991	2015	Chimney	Former power station chimney stack.
4	Buccleuch Dock hammerhead crane		50 (160)	N/A	1942	2011	Shipyard crane	Shipyard crane dismantled in 2011 was the shipyards last remaining pre-war crane
5	Furness Academy North Site							

== See also ==
- List of tallest buildings in the United Kingdom
- List of tallest buildings in Europe
- List of tallest buildings
