= South Walney =

Nature reserve in Cumbria, England

Coordinates: 54.0486°N 3.1995°W

- IUCN category IV (habitat/species management area)
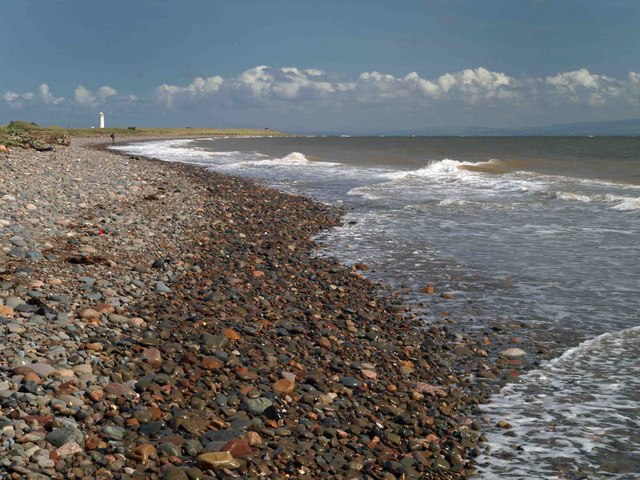
- The shingle beach on the seaward side of the reserve photographed in 2009
- Interactive map of South Walney
- Location: Cumbria, England
- Area: 130 ha (320 acres)

South Walney is one of two nature reserves on Walney Island, England. The nature reserve has an area of 130 ha leased from Holker estates. It has been managed by the Cumbria Wildlife Trust since 1963. The reserve is notable for being a colony for gulls and grey seals.

The gull colony contains both lesser black-backed gulls and herring gulls. Numbers have declined considerably since the 1970s. Among the reasons for the decline has been predation. In 2021 Cumbria Wildlife Trust reported that a predator-proof fence had protected chicks at the reserve.

The reserve is the only grey seal colony in Cumbria. Numbers have increased since the 1970s. Until recently South Walney was classed as a haul-out site rather than a breeding colony, but two pups were born in 2015, and 46 pups have been born since, with nine pups born in 2023

Other breeding bird species include common eider, Eurasian oystercatcher and common ringed plover. The reserve is the home of the Walney Bird Observatory which collates bird records from across the island. Around 300 species of bird have been recorded on Walney Island since the foundation of the bird observatory in 1964.

== Facilities ==
South Walney Nature Reserve is open daily 10am to 5pm (4pm in winter). The road to the reserve can be affected by high tides. There are bird hides. A seal webcam went live in 2016.

== Protection ==
=== Sites of Special Scientific Interest ===
South Walney and Piel Channel Flats are designated a Site of Special Scientific Interest for biological and geological interest. The SSSI includes the South Walney part of the Walney Island Geological Conservation Review Site. The SSSI is contiguous with two other SSSIs:

- the Duddon Estuary SSSI (within the Walney Channel, which separates Walney Island from the mainland)
- the Morecambe Bay SSSI.

=== Special Protection Area ===
Both the Duddon Estuary and Morecambe Bay were designated Special Protection Areas (a protected area under the European Union Birds Directive). In 2016, before the United Kingdom European Union membership referendum, there were consultations on a successful proposal that Morecambe Bay and Duddon Estuary be combined in a new SPA. The combined SPA includes a marine extension west of Walney Island to protect foraging areas of terns. This marine extension is not to be confused with the "West of Walney" Marine Conservation Zone (designated in January 2016), which is some kilometres from the coast.

== See also ==
- North Walney Nature Reserve
- Walney Lighthouse
