= North Scale =

Village in Cumbria, England

Coordinates: 54.11978°N 3.25502°W

- Location in Barrow-in-Furness Borough Location within Cumbria
- OS grid reference: SD180700
- Unitary authority: Westmorland and Furness
- Ceremonial county: Cumbria
- Region: North West
- Country: England
- Sovereign state: United Kingdom
- Post town: BARROW-IN-FURNESS
- Postcode district: LA14
- Dialling code: 01229
- Police: Cumbria
- Fire: Cumbria
- Ambulance: North West
- UK Parliament: Barrow and Furness

North Scale is a village and one of only four settlements on the Isle of Walney, Cumbria, England. It is the northernmost settlement, lying a mile north of Vickerstown.

== History ==
North Scale was first identified as an agricultural settlement, owned by Furness Abbey, in 1247.

As a Parliamentarian stronghold in the English Civil War it was briefly sieged by Royalists.

In 1865, the Crown Inn opened in North Scale.

Before the Jubilee Bridge to Walney Island opened in 1908, people crossing on foot at low tide would arrive near North Scale. A causeway was built to make crossing possible for longer periods.

== Modern development ==
The village grew with the development of the Red Ley estate in the 1960s and the Barnes estate in the 1970s.

North Scale has a community centre, and is linked by bus services to the rest of Walney Island, and to Barrow-in-Furness, via the Jubilee Bridge.

The village is home to the Lakes Gliding Club.

== In popular culture ==
North Scale is mentioned alongside Biggar in the folk song 'Wa'ney Island Cockfight' as the origin of one of the groups of cockfighters. The song has been recorded by Fiddler's Dram and Martin Wyndham-Reed.
