= West Shore =

West Shore may refer to:

== Places ==
=== Canada ===
- Western Communities or West Shore, the suburban municipalities of Colwood, Langford, Metchosin, View Royal, and The Highlands in British Columbia.

=== United Kingdom ===
- Earnse Bay, Cumbria, a large sand and shingle beach
- West Shore, a beach overlooking the estuary of the River Conwy in Llandudno, North Wales

=== United States ===
- West Shore (Harrisburg), Pennsylvania, a series of communities along the western shore of the Susquehanna River
- West Shore, Staten Island, a section of New York City

== Transportation ==
- West Shore Expressway, New York State Route 440 located on Staten Island, New York
- West Shore Railroad, a railroad connecting New York and New Jersey

== Other ==
- West Shore (magazine), the first illustrated magazine in the U.S. state of Oregon
- West Shore School District, located in Cumberland and York counties in Pennsylvania

== See also ==
- Westshore (disambiguation)
