= Walney North =

Settlement in Cumbria, England

Coordinates: 54.130°N 3.266°W

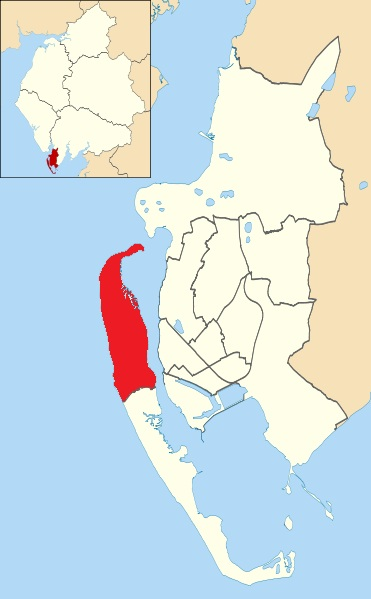
- Walney north shown within Barrow-in-Furness
- Population: 5,344 (2011)
- Unitary authority: Westmorland and Furness
- Ceremonial county: Cumbria
- Region: North West
- Country: England
- Sovereign state: United Kingdom
- Post town: BARROW-IN-FURNESS
- Postcode district: LA14
- Dialling code: 01229
- Police: Cumbria
- Fire: Cumbria
- Ambulance: North West
- UK Parliament: Barrow and Furness

Walney North is one of two wards on Walney Island in the borough of Westmorland and Furness, North West England. The 2001 UK census showed 5,604 people were living in the area, reducing to 5,304 at the 2011 Census.

Walney North consists of several settlements including North Walney, North Scale and the northern area of Vickerstown. The ward is also home to Barrow/Walney Island Airport.

Whilst still an electoral ward for Barrow Town Council, the ward was combined at a district/ local authority level with Walney South on the 1st April 2023 following formation of the new Westmorland and Furness Local Authority and be named simply 'Walney Island'.
