= Wa'ney Island Cockfight =

English folk song

"Wa'ney Island Cockfight" or "The Bonny Grey" is an English folk song, Roud 211. Variants of the song exist across northern England from Cumbria to Shropshire.

== Lyrics ==
As with many folk songs, the lyrics vary depending on the source, with references to well-known local figures and locations in various regional versions. However, the central theme of a cockfight in which the "Bonny Grey" is an unexpected winner remains.

Presented below are a small sample of the lyrics sung by Martin Wyndham-Reed on English Sporting Ballads, Broadside BRO128 in which the cockfight takes place on Walney Island.

Come all ye cockers far and near

I'll tell of a cock-fight, when and where:

At Tummerel Hill I've heard them say,

The Northscale lads had a bonny grey.

Two dozen lads from Biggar came

To Tummerel Hill to see the game.

They brought along with them that day

A black to match with the bonny grey.

A sample of another set of lyrics from the Ballads & Songs of Lancashire, which places the cockfight in Liverpool, is presented below for comparison.

Come all you cock-merchants far and near,

Did you hear of a cock-fight happening here?

Those Liverpool lads, I've heard them say,

'Tween the Charcoal Black and the Bonny Gray.

== Recordings ==
Artist	Title	Album	Year
Martin Wyndham Reed	The charcoal black and the bonny grey	English Sporting Ballads	1977
Fiddler's Dram	Wa'ney Island Cockfight	To See the Play	1978
