= Walney Island =

Island in Cumbria, England

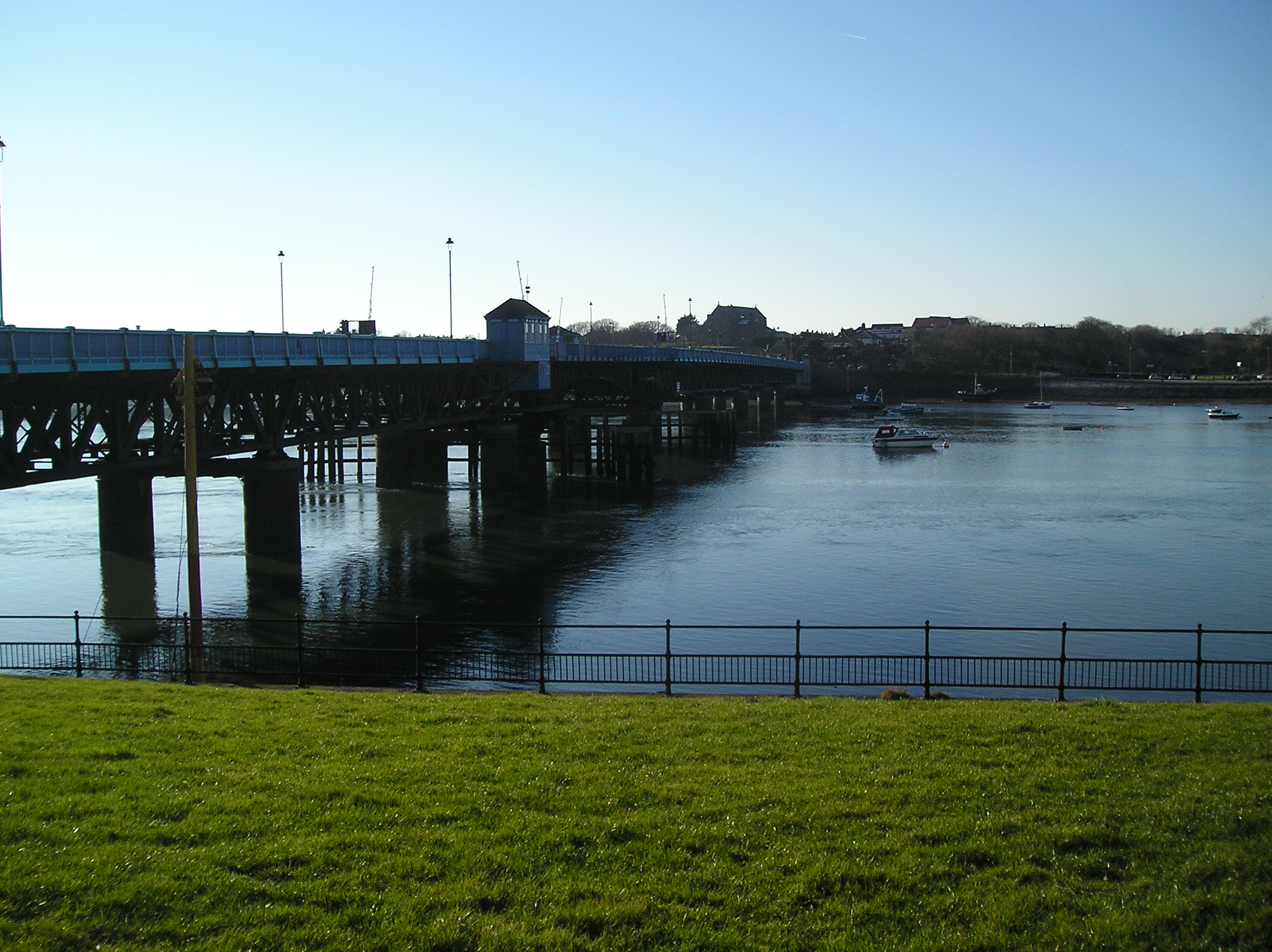
- Walney from the Channelside Haven

- Location within Cumbria Location within Morecambe Bay Location within the former Borough of Barrow-in-Furness

Geography
- Location: Barrow-in-Furness Irish Sea
- Coordinates: 54.103°N 3.252°W
- Area: 5.01 sq mi (13.0 km^{2})
- Length: 11 mi (18 km)
- Width: 1 mi (2 km)

Administration
- England
- Ceremonial county: Cumbria
- Historic county: Lancashire
- Unitary authority: Westmorland and Furness

Demographics
- Population: 10,519
- Pop. density: 2,595/sq mi (1001.9/km^{2})

Walney Island, also known as the Isle of Walney, is an island off the west coast of England, at the western end of Morecambe Bay in the Irish Sea. The island is in Cumbria and is also located within the boundaries of the historic county of Lancashire. It is part of Barrow-in-Furness and is separated from the mainland by Walney Channel, which is spanned by the Jubilee Bridge. Walney is the largest island of the Furness Islands group, both in population and size, as well as the largest English island in the Irish Sea. Its population at the 2011 UK Census was 10,651, distributed evenly across the island's two wards of Walney North and Walney South.

Walney Island formed during the last glacial period, when the River Duddon was a large glacial lake, depositing till at its mouth, which became Walney. Some evidence of Neolithic inhabitants has been found in the island's sand dunes, though its name is likely of Norse origin. The island remained rural until the growth of Barrow-in-Furness' industries in the nineteenth century. In particular, the development between 1867 and 1881 of docks at Barrow Island, in Walney Channel opposite Walney, encouraged the growth of Walney as a settlement.

The planned worker town of Vickerstown was built on the island in 1898, resulting in a large population increase, and the construction of Jubilee Bridge connected Walney to the mainland in 1908. Walney's contemporary population now forms about a fifth of the overall population of Barrow-in-Furness. The island contains two nature reserves, at either end, and its sandy beaches make it a popular leisure site.

== Toponymy ==
The name Walney is thought to come from Old Norse. Whilst the suffix "-ey" is a common feature of island names, the source of "waln" is less clear. The island is listed in the Domesday Book of 1086 as Hougenai. The manor of "Hougun" – possibly modern day Millom – is listed in the book as owning the settlements of the whole of Furness, so that 'Hougenai' appears to mean "island of Hougun". The Old Norse word haugr means mound or hill. However, other Norse etymologies have also been suggested for the source of the island's name.

== History ==
Excavations of sand dunes on Walney have revealed evidence of Late Neolithic/early Bronze Age settlements on the island, including a small amount of pottery. Low Furness was most extensively inhabited by Norse settlers, probably travelling from Ireland or the Isle of Man, which is reflected in many local place names, including Walney. Through the Middle Ages, Walney and Furness were dominated by the monks of Furness Abbey, who constructed Biggar Dyke as flood defences on the east coast of Walney. During this time, Walney was largely pastoral, and remained so into the early Industrial Revolution: in his 1810-book Guide to the Lakes, William Wordsworth describes seeing "Walney's early fields of corn" from the summit of Black Combe.

However, Walney was soon caught up in the rapid expansion of industry at Barrow-in-Furness. Barrow docks were built on Barrow Island, in Walney Channel. The island acted as a natural shelter, which allowed the development of Barrow's large shipbuilding yards. In the 1870s, Biggar Bank became a popular seaside recreation site on Walney, and this was reinforced when a regular ferry, operated by the Furness Railway Company, was launched. In 1897, in response to the high levels of immigration to Barrow from across the UK, Vickers proposed to build a new planned town on Walney Island. At the same time, other developers imagined developing Biggar into a larger seaside resort. The first tenants moved into Vickerstown in 1900, and this saw the beginning of the integration of Walney as part of the town of Barrow. Walney Bridge, a Bascule bridge was built in this decade, opening in 1908 and connecting the island to the mainland.

Vickers operated facilities constructing submarines and other shipping in Barrow in the early parts of World War I, and these or nearby installations may have been the targets of the German submarine U-21, which approached Walney Island in shallow water in the early afternoon of Friday, 29 January 1915. The artillery battery at Fort Walney, manned by 7 Company, Lancashire and Cheshire Royal Garrison Artillery, opened fire on the submarine at a range of around 7,000 yards (6,400 metres) after the submarine fired its deck gun at the airship station on the island. After a few minutes' exchange of fire, with no hits on either side, the submarine withdrew.

Walney continued to grow through the twentieth century, with a number of suburban housing developments on the island. The majority of growth occurred between the building of the 'Links' estate in 1936, and the completion of suburban housing at North Scale in 1976. The recreational facilities at Biggar Bank were scaled back, but the island's beaches remain locally popular. Walney's population in the 2001 census was 11,388, representing 15% of the overall population of the Borough of Barrow-in-Furness and around 19% of the population of the town of Barrow-in-Furness.

== Geography ==
=== Location and transport ===
Walney lies off the southwest coast of Cumbria in the Irish Sea. It is 11 miles (18 kilometres) long from north to south, but never more than 1 mi (2 km) wide from east to west, with spits at either end. The channel separating it from the Great Britain mainland is also narrow, and named Walney Channel. The northern portion of the channel opens into the Duddon Estuary and is both narrower and shallower; at low tide, it is passable on foot, with stepping stones known locally as 'Widow's Crossing' assisting pedestrians. The southern half of the channel is wider and is regularly dredged to allow shipping to access the Port of Barrow. This half opens into Morecambe Bay and includes a number of small islands, of which Barrow Island, Roa and Piel are inhabited. North of Earnsie Point are secluded beaches, backed by dunes, which tend to be used by naturists.

Jubilee Bridge, a bascule bridge, has connected Walney to the mainland since 1908. The bridge forms part of the A590, which runs between Walney's western coast and the M6 Motorway. A second bridge over Walney Channel is sometimes mooted, in order to improve access and relieve traffic, though there has never been any significant attempt to provide one. The nearest railway station to Walney is Barrow-in-Furness. No long distance bus services are provided, and all services from the island are provided by Stagecoach and terminate in Barrow.

Walney Island has a small airport (Barrow/Walney Island Airport), privately owned by BAE Systems. It opened in 1935 and was initially used for military purposes during World War II, before Barrow council purchased the airfield. It was purchased by Vickers in 1968 and has remained with the company's successors ever since. There have been a few attempts at scheduled passenger services – Air Ecosse, Air Furness and Telair have all operated flights from the island – but none has lasted longer than two years.

=== Settlements ===
The main settlement on Walney, Vickerstown, is effectively a continuation of Barrow-in-Furness, lying on the Barrow-facing east coast at the island's centre, clustered around the Jubilee Bridge. The first parts of Vickerstown were constructed in the 1890s as a workers' community for Vickers Shipyard, but this area has since been expanded by suburban development. The only residential areas on the west coast are at Earnse Bay and Biggar Bank, both of which are extensions to the central Vickerstown settlement. Beyond Vickerstown, the island retains two older villages. North Scale lies near to and to the north of Vickerstown on Walney's east coast, and consists mainly of suburban homes.

Biggar is the more isolated of the two villages, located around 2 mi (3 km) to the south of Vickerstown. Biggar is situated on the east coast of the island and is a more agricultural community, with farms extending south of the village as far as the South Walney Nature Reserve. It is possibly the oldest settlement on Walney, with Furness Abbey records from 1292 mentioning a grange at Biggar, and today is still a farming village.

=== Environment ===
Walney is low-lying, narrow and windswept – it is said by the North-West Evening Mail to be the windiest lowland site in England. The island's northern and southern ends, South Walney and North Walney, are both nature reserves, consisting of salt-marsh, shingle, sand dunes and brackish ponds.

South Walney is home to a large number of birds, many of which use the island as a stop whilst migrating. Breeding bird species at South Walney include common eider, common ringed plover, Eurasian oystercatcher, lesser black-backed gull and herring gull. South Walney is also the home of the Walney Bird Observatory. North Walney provides a habitat for natterjack toads, as well as Geranium sanguineum var. striatum, the Walney geranium, found only on the island. The island's west coast is characterised by wide sandy beaches, whilst its east coast is more built up, facing the narrow and muddy Walney Channel.

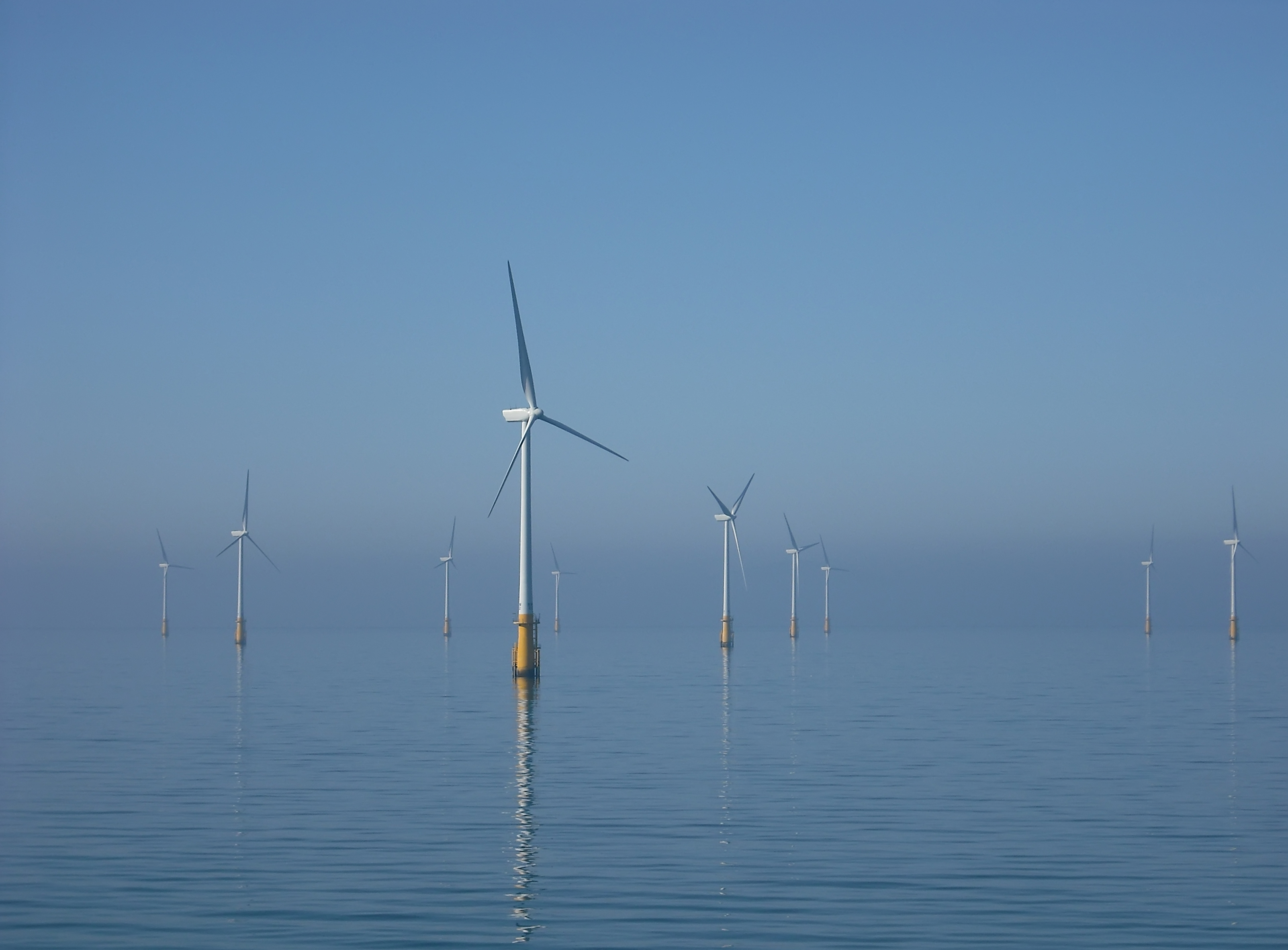
Barrow Offshore Wind Farm

Since 2005, the coast off Walney has become a centre for the construction of offshore wind farms.

Name	Number of turbines	Capacity (MW)	Construction began	Operation began
Barrow Offshore Wind Farm	30	90	2004	2006
Ormonde Wind Farm	30	150	2010	2011
Walney Wind Farm 1	51	184	2010	2011
Walney Wind Farm 2	51	183.6	2011	2011
West of Duddon Sands Wind Farm	108	389	2013	2014
Walney Extension Wind Farm	108	660	2017	2018

== Government, economy and education ==
Since 2023 Walney has been part of Westmorland and Furness. It was previously part of the Borough of Barrow-in-Furness, within the larger county of Cumbria, for which Walney is again divided into two wards. In the May 2013 Cumbria County Council elections Walney North and Walney South wards both elected Labour Party councillors. At the 2011 elections at the Borough level, six Labour Party councillors were elected from the island, three from each ward. At a national level, Walney forms part of the Barrow and Furness parliamentary constituency. The Member of Parliament is currently Michelle Scrogham who won the seat at the 2024 General Election.

At the 2001 UK census, Walney North had an unemployment rate of 7.7%, whilst it was 6.3% in Walney South Walney was historically agricultural, and a number of farms remain on the island, particularly on its southern half. Following the construction of Vickerstown, the defence manufacturer Vickers became the major employer on the island, reflecting wider trends in Barrow-in-Furness. Vickers' successor, BAE Systems, remains a major employer in Barrow and on Walney today: the island has particularly high levels of workers in skilled trades.

Walney has one secondary school, Walney School. It opened in 1952 and currently teaches 468 pupils. It has several primary schools but, students entering sixth form college or further education must go to schools on the mainland in Barrow.

== Sport and culture ==
Football and rugby league are the most popular amateur sports in the Furness area. Walney Central amateur rugby league club currently play in the Cumbria Men’s Amateur Rugby League. The club was formed in 1936, and have played on the island ever since. They reached the second round of the Challenge Cup in 1960, losing to Oldham and they competed in the National Conference League between 1991 and 2007. In football, Vickerstown Football Club play in the West Lancashire Football League (WFL) Premier Division (level 11 of the English football league system), while Walney Island Football Club, formed as Nautical FC in 1970, compete in the WFL Division Two.

Walney has become an important location for kitesurfing and wind-surfing. It annually hosts one of the rounds of the British Kitesurfing Championship. In particular the flat, wide beach at Earnse Bay is popular for this sport. Windsurfing takes place around the island, particularly to its west coast and around the mouth of Walney Channel.

In literature, Walney most notably appears, or rather disappears, in The Railway Series books by the Rev. W. Awdry, which was adapted into the television series Thomas the Tank Engine and Friends. The books and television series are all set on the fictional Island of Sodor, which is located in the position of Walney, though significantly larger. Its east coast resembles that of Walney, and the main town to the east of the island is 'Vicarstown', located at the same place as Vickerstown.

In music, Walney appears in the song "Wa'ney Island Cockfight", which describes a cockfight between the lads of North Scale and Biggar on the island. The song has been recorded by Fiddler's Dram and Martin Wyndham-Reed.

Public houses located on Walney are The Castle (Biggar Bank), The Queen's Arms (Biggar village), The King Alfred, briefly the Mr Elephant Indian restaurant (Ocean Rd.), The Ferry (Promenade) and The Crown (North Scale). Former public houses closed or demolished are The Island Tavern (formerly The Periscope), The George and The Vickerstown Institute.

== See also ==
- Manor of Hougun
- Walney Lighthouse
- Walney School
- Vickerstown
- North Scale
- Biggar
- Eleanor Williams
- Walney Channel
- Jubilee Bridge
