= Walney School =

Secondary school in Barrow-in-Furness, Cumbria, England

Walney Academy

Location
- Sandy Gap Lane; Barrow-in-Furness, Cumbria, LA14 3JT; England; 54°06′17″N 3°15′31″W

Information
- Type: Academy
- Local authority: Westmorland and Furness
- Department for Education URN: 141041 Tables
- Ofsted: Reports
- Head teacher: Jennifer Wildman
- Gender: Coeducational
- Age: 11 to 16
- Enrolment: 468
- Colours: green, blue, grey
- Website: www.walney-school.co.uk

Walney Academy is a secondary school on Walney Island in Barrow-in-Furness, Cumbria. As a result of the Education Act 1944, Walney Island needed to have its own secondary school. Today (2020) it is an 11 – 16 Academy with approximately 585 students currently on roll.

== History ==
Vickerstown is an area of Barrow-in-Furness, is an example of a planned estate built for workers by a company needing to expand. It was constructed in the early 20th century by Vickers Shipbuilding and Engineering, on Walney Island; an island connected to the British mainland via Barrow Island, by a swing bridge. The school is on the edge of Vickerstown. As a result of the Education Act 1944, Walney Island needed to have its own secondary school. The present Sandy Gap site was agreed in 1951 and the school built.

Lord Cavendish opened a new Sensory Garden in 2003.

Walney Academy achieved Specialist Engineering Status in 2009, in Winter 2010 began to expand, by building a £6m redevelopment and extension. It will has 10 new classrooms, two music rooms, two art rooms and an additional science block. The single storey classrooms also have a Sedam turf roof, with plants growing on top to have an environmental and visual appeal. The work was meant to be undertaken in five phases, taking 65 weeks, for completion in August, the next year but due to bad weather was finally completed in summer 2012. Although to go along with the Specialist Engineering Status the £300,000 engineering innovation centre was built and completed in September 2011.

In October 2013 harvest mites were found in the ventilation system of the school resulting in it being closed for three days. Cumbria County Council found no link to the Sedam turf roof and ordered a new roof maintenance plan to be introduced.

In September 2014 the school converted to academy status as part of the Queen Katherine School Multi-Academy Trust.

Since June 2022 George Hastwell School have been occupying four of the classrooms in Walney School during Thursdays and will be moving in fully as of September 2022.

=== Context ===
Walney Academy is an 11–16 academy with approximately 518 students on roll and a capacity for 900. It converted to an academy in September 2014, when the predecessor school was condemned by Ofsted and placed in special measures. Since 2025 the school has been sponsored by the Furness Education Trust.

== Inspections ==
In 2025 the school was inspected by Ofsted and graded as "requires improvement" in all areas, the same rating it has held since 2018. However, following new leadership and joining the Furness Education Trust, the leadership team are said to be "energised by the challenge" and that the school is on a "positive trajectory."

== Achievements ==
In 2004, at General Certificate of Secondary Education and General National Vocational Qualification, the school was ranked 33rd out of the forty-seven secondary schools in Cumbria at the time. It has no Sixth Form, so does not teach at 'A'-level.
