= Craven House =

Coordinates: 54.11020°N 3.22751°W

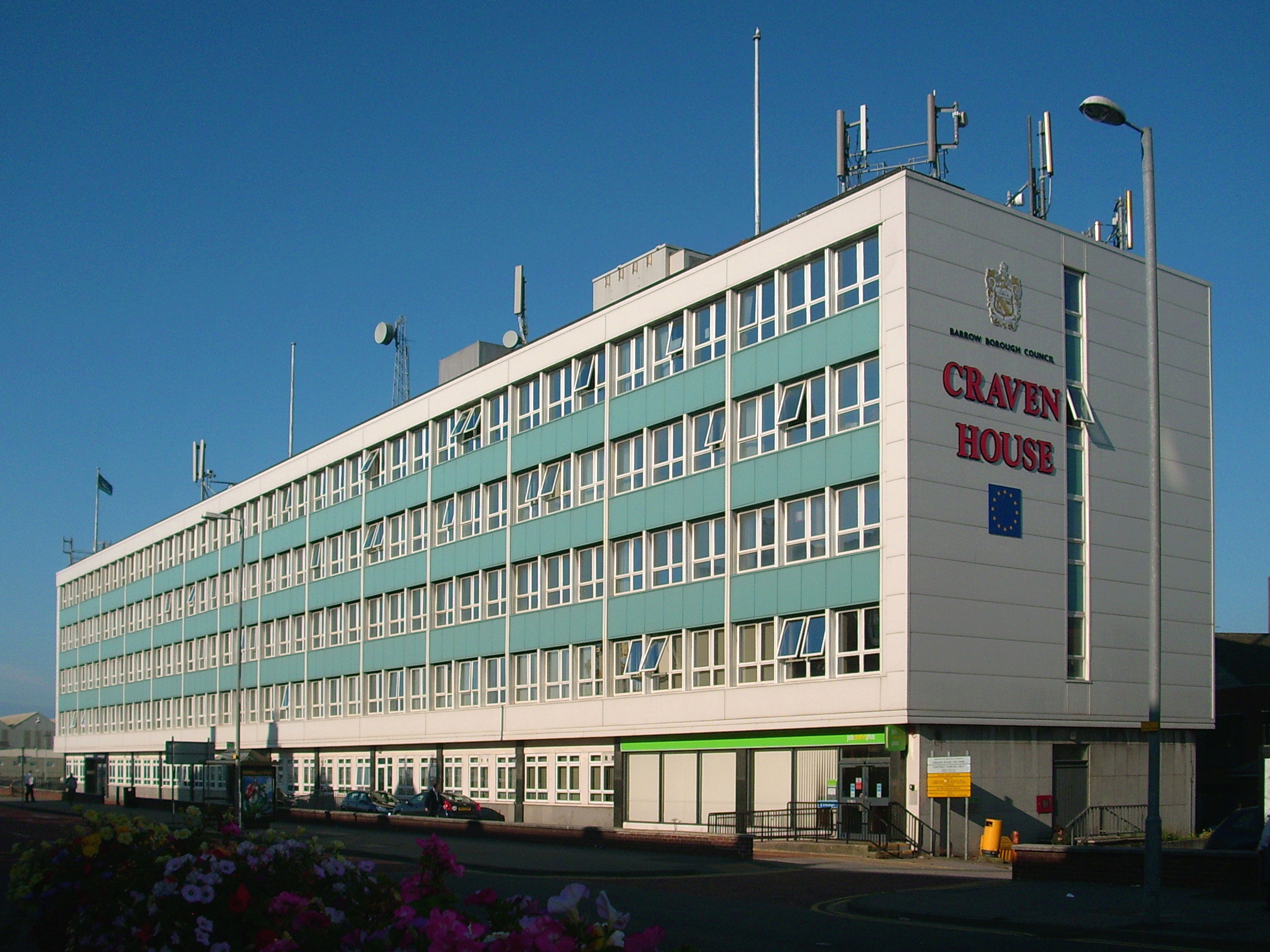
Craven House as viewed from Schneider Square in August 2010

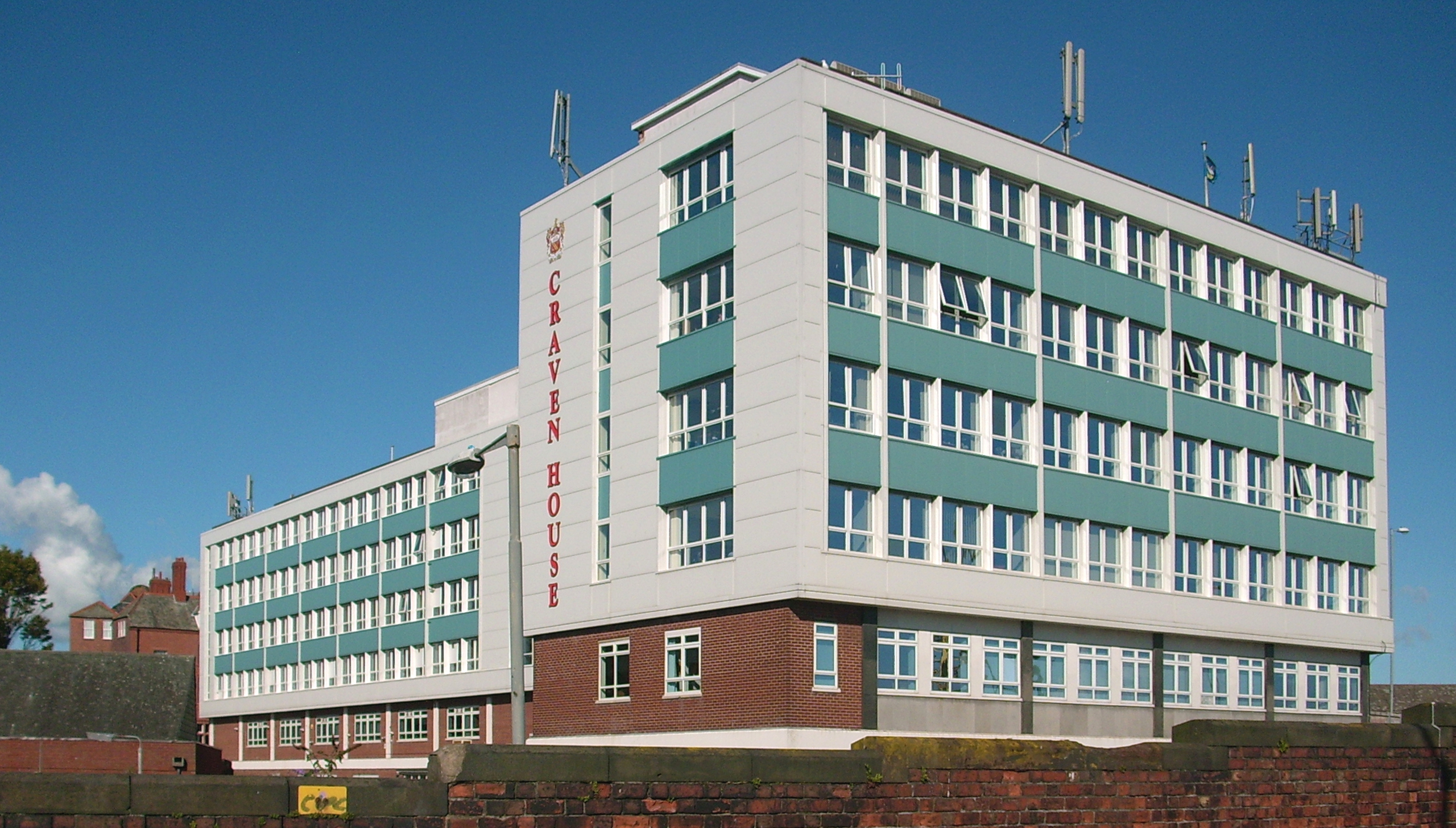
The south-facing facade of Craven House

Craven House (also known as Fisher House) is a large office building in Barrow-in-Furness, Cumbria, England located on Michaelson Road close to the eponymous bridge. Constructed in the 1960s the building is noted for its length of roughly 90 m (300 ft) and consists of seven floors making it one of the tallest storied buildings in the town. The gross floor area stands at around 8,100 square metres (87,000 sq ft). Craven House is owned by the Department for Work and Pensions through Barrow Borough Council and currently houses the town's principal Jobcentre alongside leasing office space to the headquarters of successful shipping company James Fisher & Sons - the only Barrow based company listed on the London Stock Exchange.

In 2003 the entire external fabric of the building was recladded and a further £1.7 million was spent in 2013 on refurbishing the inside of the building and installing a new roof. Craven House generates around £176,000 for Barrow Borough Council per annum, making it the largest individual commercial asset under the council's possession.

== Tenants ==
- Agilisys
- Cumbria County Council
- James Fisher & Sons
- Jobcentre

== See also ==
- List of tallest buildings and structures in Barrow-in-Furness
