= Westshore =

Westshore may refer to:

- Westshore, New Zealand, a suburb of Napier
- Westshore (Tampa), a business district in Florida, United States
  - WestShore Plaza, a shopping center
  - South Westshore, a neighborhood

== See also ==
- West Shore (disambiguation)
