= Vickerstown =

Settlement in Cumbria, England

Coordinates: 54.1064°N 3.25708°W

- Location in the former Barrow-in-Furness borough Location within Cumbria
- OS grid reference: SD179685
- Civil parish: Barrow
- Unitary authority: Westmorland and Furness
- Ceremonial county: Cumbria
- Region: North West
- Country: England
- Sovereign state: United Kingdom
- Post town: BARROW-IN-FURNESS
- Postcode district: LA14
- Dialling code: 01229
- Police: Cumbria
- Fire: Cumbria
- Ambulance: North West
- UK Parliament: Barrow and Furness

Vickerstown is an area of Barrow-in-Furness, Cumbria, England, covered by the wards of Walney North and Walney South. It is an example of a model village built for workers by a company needing to expand, having been constructed in the early 20th century by Vickers Shipbuilding and Engineering. Vickerstown contains two Conservation Areas and is home to the majority of the population of Walney Island.

== History ==
=== Beginnings ===
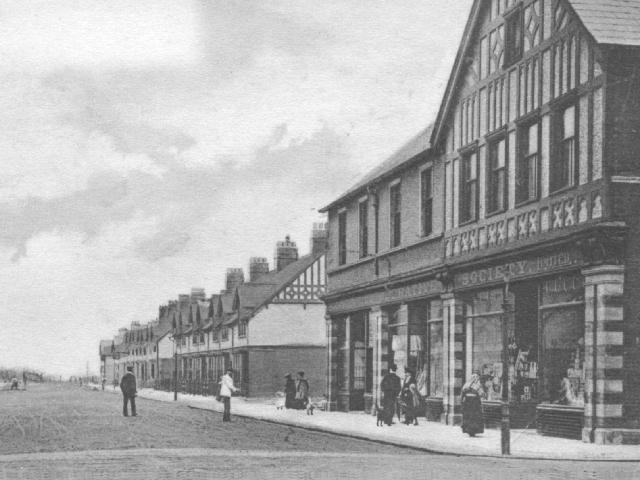
Powerful Street photographed in 1904

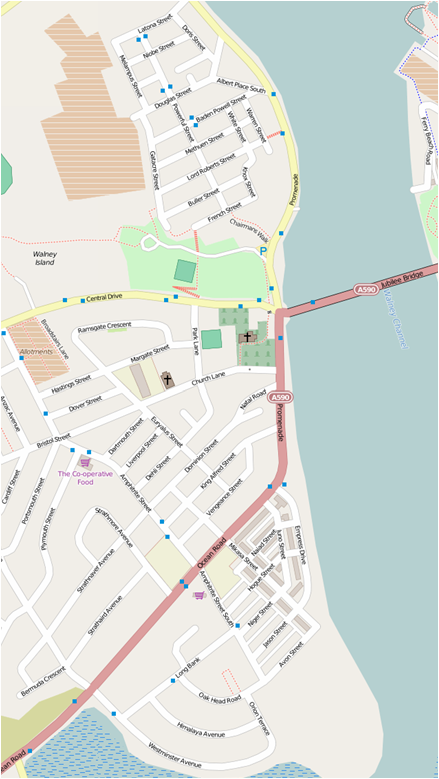
Map of Vickerstown on the eastern shore of Walney Island

Its construction was prompted by a lack of housing available for the workers at Barrow's shipyard, owned at the time by Vickers. Some workers were forced to live on board the Atlantic liner SS Alaska, which was moored in the docks. Plans for its development were begun in 1898 and Vickers bought out the Isle of Walney Estates Company to handle the construction.

Homes were designed to last, with the houses in a Tudor Revival terrace style. Larger houses overlooking Walney Channel were reserved for managers' families. The good construction of this estate meant that Walney did not have the slums that plagued other parts of the country and even Barrow in the 1950s. Most streets in Vickerstown are named after ships built at Vickers (including HMS Euryalus, HMS Juno, HMS Latona, Japanese battleship Mikasa, HMS Niobe and HMS Vengeance) and other portstowns and cities in the UK (including Bristol, Folkestone, Hastings, Liverpool and Southampton).

=== Development ===
The first 1,000 houses were completed in 1901 and tenants soon moved in, with strict selection criteria. A toll bridge to the mainland was opened in 1908.

The rearmament programme and the First World War led to a second phase of building during which government loans were used to build accommodation for workers but these houses were more utilitarian than those in the original plans.

After the First World War, houses began to be sold on to tenants and in 1951, with only a handful of properties still under its control, the estate company was wound up.

== Modern Vickerstown ==
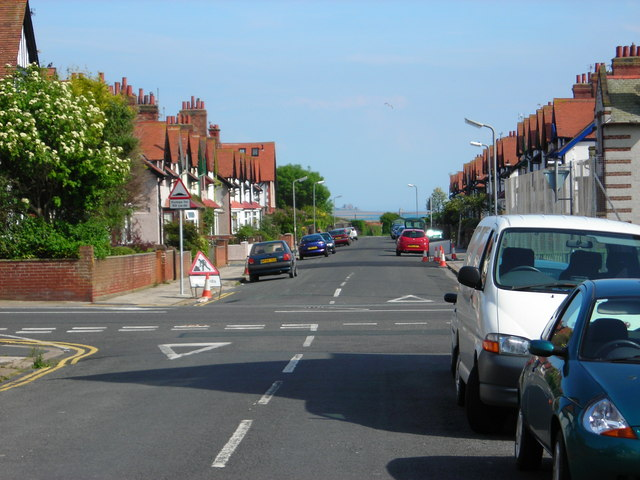
Mikasa Street photographed in 2006

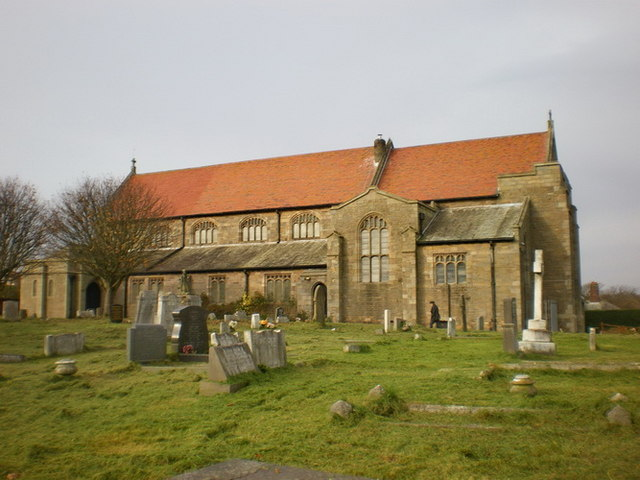
A church has stood on the site of St. Mary's in Vickerstown since the 17th century

Vickerstown remains part of the town of Barrow and much of the area was declared a conservation area in 1988, to keep the character of the estate intact. Barrow shipyard continues to be the largest employer in the town, though it is now owned by BAE Systems. The A590 road begins just west of Vickerstown and runs through the area before crossing Walney Bridge into the Barrow Island area of Barrow. The A590 continues for 34 miles towards the M6 motorway. There are two places of worship in Vickerstown, a medical centre, a fire station, three primary schools, several pubs and numerous businesses including Tesco and Co-op supermarkets. Walney School is located close to Vickerstown and offers secondary education for the island's residents. Vickerstown Football Club and Walney Island FC are based in the area and both compete in the West Lancashire Football League and the cricket club is a long-standing member of the Cumbria Cricket League.

== In popular culture ==
Wilbert Awdry's Railway Series books and its television adaptations—Thomas & Friends and Thomas & Friends: All Engines Go—are set on the fictional Island of Sodor, which takes the place of Walney Island. Sodor is linked to the mainland by two bridges, one road and one rail, across the Walney Channel. The town on the Sodor side of the bridges is named "Vicarstown", positioned in the same place as the real-life Vickerstown.

== See also ==
- Saltaire
- Barrow-in-Furness
- Vickers
- Walney Island
