= Roy Harris (folk singer) =

British singer (1933–2016)

- Born: 15 June 1933; Derby, England
- Died: 9 February 2016 (aged 82); Cardiff, Wales
- Occupations: folk singer, founder of folk clubs, actor, journalist, radio personality
- Spouse: Elaine Jenkins Harris
- Children: Neil Harris (spouse Elizabeth Ann Porter Harris)

Roy Harris (15 June 1933 – 9 February 2016) was a British folk singer known for his role in the starting the folk club movement in southern Wales in the 1960s. He was often referred to as the “gentleman of folk song” due to his warm personality and congeniality as a folk club host. Harris primarily sang unaccompanied sea and military songs. Over the years Harris recorded over a dozen albums, mostly on the Topic Records and Fellside Recordings labels, along with notable British singers including Ewan MacColl, Frankie Armstrong, Martin Carthy and Martyn Wyndham-Read.

== Biography ==
Harris was born into a working-class family in Derby, England, on 15 June 1933 but would always associate with nearby Nottingham and referred to it as his home city. Harris started out singing in school choirs and was known to perform Al Jolson and Nat King Cole songs in local talent shows. He also loved amateur boxing and football. He trialled for Nottingham Forest, the football team he supported all his life.

Harris served his National Service in the army and then re-enlisted in the RAF becoming a physical training instructor (PTI) in the Royal Air Force until 1959. It was during his military service that he first heard the song "McCafferty", which sparked his interest in folk music, especially in military songs. He later recorded that song and other powerful military songs on the album The Rambling Soldier (Fellside Recordings, FE 017).

Harris started out in folk music by playing washboard in a skiffle group (a blues/jazz-inspired type of folk music with a blues or jazz flavour that was popular in the 1950s and 1960s) at small folk clubs in England. He was stationed at RAF St Athan and met his future wife Elaine at a local dance in 1955. After military service in Germany, England, Cyprus and Wales he opened Wales' first folk club, the Cardiff Folk Club, which became popular and attracted such guests as the Ian Campbell Folk Group, Shirley Collins and Luke Kelly, later of The Dubliners. The club was held upstairs at the Estonian Club in Cardiff and met on Thursday evenings. In the early days there was just a handful of attendees, but over time the club grew so popular they had to turn people away. Eventually they outgrew the Estonian Club so they moved to the British Legion club in Womanby Street. On their opening night at the new location, there were 500 folk singers and other guests in attendance.

Harris decided to try his luck as a professional folk singer after a well-received performance at the Sidmouth Festival in 1964, after being fired from three different jobs for taking time off to perform.

In 1967 he founded the Nottingham Traditional Music Club, which was known, and criticised by some, for its very strict adherence to traditional music. The club was active for 22 years and had its own Morris Dance team, mummers group and research group. Harris encouraged various other groups and clubs to form over the years, including the Dolphin Morris Men and the Owd ‘Oss Mummers.

Harris served as the director of the National Folk Festival from 1976 to 1980. In the early years it was at Keele University and then the festival moved to Loughborough University. After Harris left, it moved around a bit before settling at Sutton Bonington School of Agriculture which is just a few miles from Loughborough. Harris was the first professional musician to appear at the Bermuda Folk Club.

Harris hosted a folk music programme on BBC Radio Nottingham for 10 years and his own column in the Nottingham Evening Post. He also tried his hand at acting, radio and writing. Harris had many small roles on television over the years, usually in crowd scenes, once as a boxing referee in a drama series set in the 1950s. He had a speaking role as a sweet shop owner in a TV play about ice skating. He also provided the music for various radio documentaries.

In 1991 he opened another new club, Traditions at the Tiger, in Long Eaton, which as of 2016 still met weekly. Traditions at the Tiger or Tigerfolk as it is now called (the Tiger closed in 2011) now meets in the Stumble Inn just a few yards away and has always run monthly over its 25 years.

In 2009, Harris was awarded the Eisteddfod Award by the Folk Music Society of New York. The Eisteddfod award is given for dedication, inspiration, and service to the practice and dissemination of traditional folk song, music, and dance.

Harris continued to perform until ill-health forced him to stop touring in 1999. He did manage one last trip to the United States in 2009. Returning to live in Cardiff in 1993, his love for music continued and he continued to sing and do some performing until his death in 2016.

== Discography ==
- The Bitter and The Sweet (Topic Records, 1971)
- The Valiant Sailor (with Frankie Armstrong, A.L. Lloyd, Martyn Wyndham-Read, Topic Records, 1973)
- Sea Shanties (with A.L. Lloyd, Ian Manuel, Bernard Wrigley, Martyn Wyndham-Read, Topic Records, 1974)
- Champions of Folly (Topic Records, 1975)
- By Sandback Fields (Topic Records, 1977)
- The Tale of Ale (with Robin & Barry Dransfield, Peter Bellamy & more, Free Reed Records, 1977 - 2LPs)
- The Rambling Soldier (Fellside Recordings, 1979)
- A Selection from the Penguin Book of English Folk Songs (with Martin Carthy, Jez Lowe, Linda Adams & John Bowden, Fellside Recordings, 1985)
- Utter Simplicity (Fellside Recordings, 1985)
- Why Does It Have To Be Me? (Fuse Records, 1986 - children's songs)
- The English Rebels (Mek Records, 1988 - on two tracks)
- Flash Company: A Celebration of the First Ten Years of Fellside Recordings (Fellside Recordings sampler, 1992)
- Voices: English Traditional Songs (Fellside Recordings, 1992)
- Bold Sportsmen All (with Ewan MacColl and A.L. Lloyd, Topic Records, on one track on the 1998 expanded CD reissue)
- Live at The Lion (WildGoose Records, 1999 - recorded live at The White Lion folk club, Wherwell, Hampshire, UK)
