= North Walney Nature Reserve =

Nature reserve in Barrow-in-Furness, Cumbria, England

Coordinates: 54.14°N 3.26°W

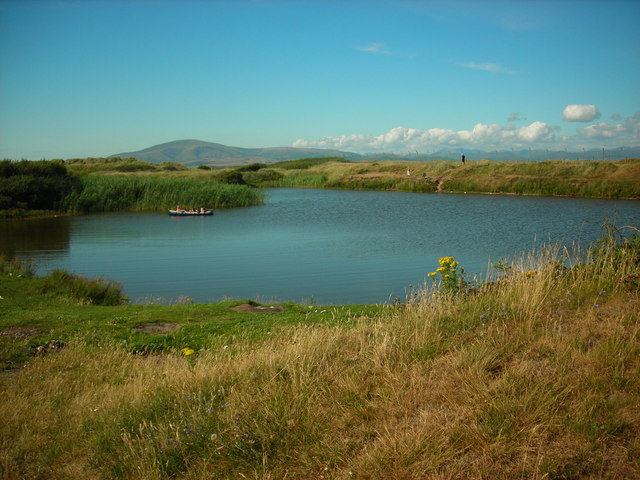
North Walney Nature Reserve

North Walney Nature Reserve is a national nature reserve on Walney Island, England. The reserve, which has an area of 646.5 ha, is notable as a habitat of natterjack toads. It is one of the sites in the Duddon Estuary which support one-fifth of the national population of the rare amphibian.

== Habitats ==
The geology of the island is the product of erosion and reworking of glacial sediments, sometimes interpreted as an esker. The reserve protects a sand dune system along with other habitats such as salt marsh and intertidal mudflats.

== Protection ==
North Walney was formerly a separate Site of Special Scientific Interest, but it has been amalgamated with other SSSIs to form the Duddon Estuary Site of Special Scientific Interest. The Duddon Estuary was designated a Special Protection Area under the Birds Directive, and is now merged with Morecambe Bay.

== See also ==
There is a separate nature reserve at South Walney, managed by the Cumbria Wildlife Trust, notable for its gulls and seals.
