= Walney Channel =

Body of water in the United Kingdom

Coordinates: 54.102°N 3.240°W

The Walney Channel separates Walney Island from the British mainland. The northern portion of the channel opens into the Duddon Estuary and is both narrower and shallower. The southern half of the channel is wider and is regularly dredged to allow shipping to access the Port of Barrow. This half opens into Morecambe Bay.

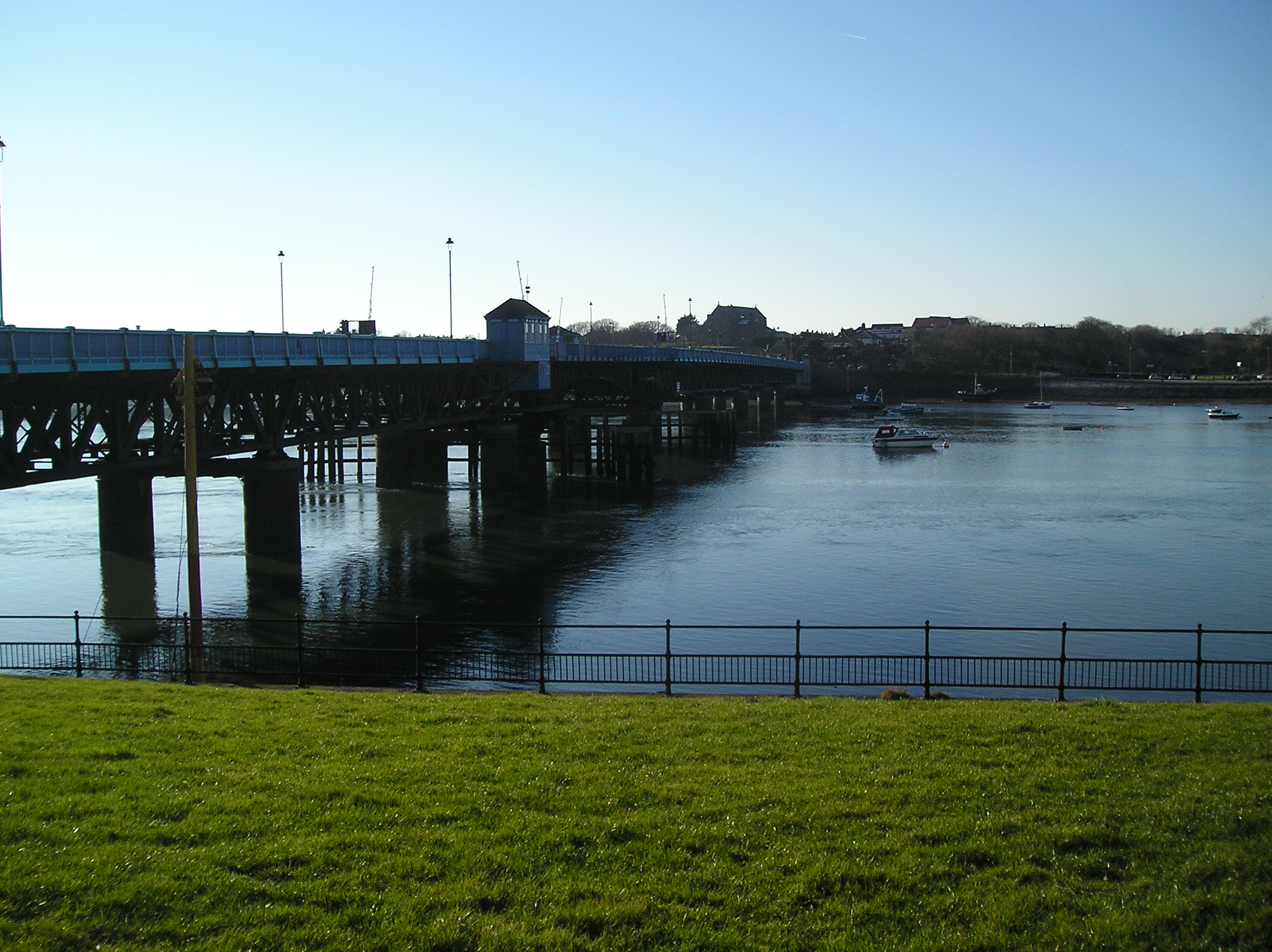
The bridge across the channel

The channel is spanned by Walney Bridge (officially Jubilee Bridge) completed in 1908. Because of the needs of navigation, particularly the activities of the Vickers shipyard, it was constructed as a bascule bridge. The bridge that crosses the channel is also part of the A590.

Investigations are ongoing into the possibility of seagrass restoration in the channel.
