= Barrow Offshore Wind Farm =

Offshore wind farm in the East Irish Sea

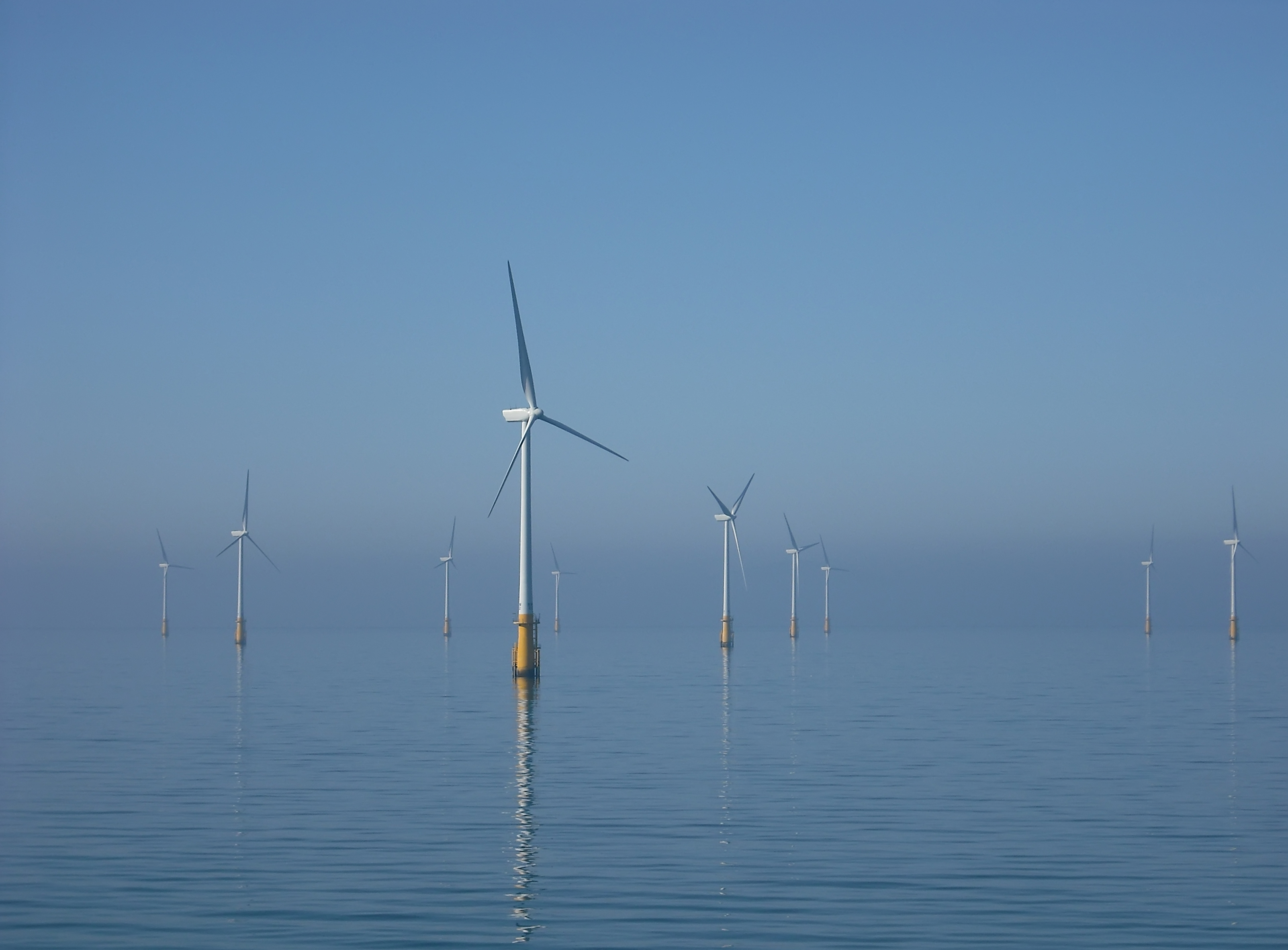
- Barrow Offshore Wind Farm, April 2009
- Country: England, United Kingdom
- Location: East Irish Sea, south west of Walney Island, Barrow-in-Furness, Cumbria
- Coordinates: 53°59′00″N 3°17′00″W
- Status: Operational
- Commission date: 2006
- Owner: Ørsted A/S

Wind farm
- Type: Offshore
- Distance from shore: 7 km (4 mi)
- Hub height: 75 m (246 ft)
- Rotor diameter: 90 m (300 ft)

Power generation
- Units operational: 30
- Make and model: Vestas Wind Systems: Vestas V90-3MW
- Nameplate capacity: 90MW

External links
- Commons: Related media on Commons

Wind farm layout

The Barrow Offshore Wind Farm is a 30 turbine 90MW capacity offshore wind farm in the East Irish Sea approximately seven kilometres (four nautical miles) southwest of Walney Island, near Barrow-in-Furness, Cumbria, England.

Construction of the wind farm took place between 2005 and 2006. The farm is operated by Barrow Offshore Wind Limited, owned by Ørsted A/S.

== Planning and design ==
Barrow wind farm was a UK Round 1 wind farm development originally developed by Warwick Energy Limited. A planning application was submitted in 2001, and planning consent given in March 2003; the project was sold to Centrica (25%, c.£22.5million), Ørsted A/S (then named DONG Energy) (37.5%), and Statkraft (37.5%) in Sep. 2003. The estimated cost of developing the project was £100 million, of which £10million was provided by a UK government grant. In 2004 Centrica and Ørsted bought the Statkraft stake, forming a 50:50 joint venture in the development.

The initial Warwick Energy proposal was for a 30 turbine wind farm 7 km southwest of Walney Island (Cumbria), with a generating capacity of up to 108 MW; electrical power supply to the mainland was to be via a ~25 km long 132 kV cable making landfall near Heysham, with connection to the mainland electrical grid at an extension to an existing electricity substation south of Heysham nuclear power station. Turbines were expected to have ~50m radius blades, with a 75m hub height, and be in water at a depth of ~20 m, with a ~32.5 m sub-sea bed monopile foundation; the turbines were to be spaced approximately 500 m apart in four rows aligned to face the prevailing southwesterly winds, with a row spacing of ~750 m.

== Construction ==
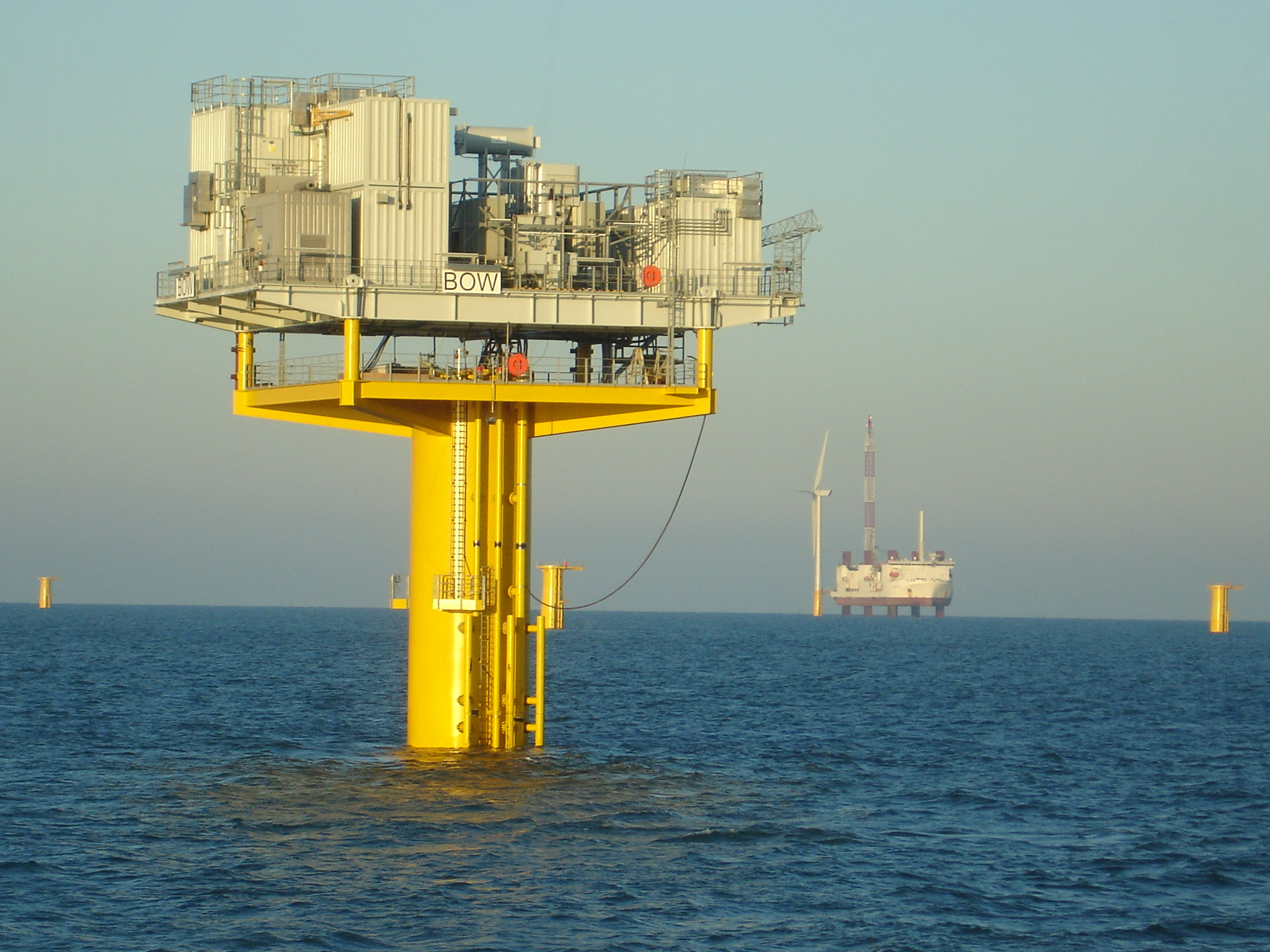
Offshore substation, with jackup ship and wind turbine in background (2006)

In July 2004 Kellogg Brown & Root Ltd and Vestas-Celtic Wind Technology Ltd were awarded the contract to install and commission the wind farm, and to operate the wind farm for five years. A 30-turbine wind farm with a capacity of 90MW was constructed by the consortium between July 2005 and May 2006. The main construction base was at Harland and Wolff's shipyard in Belfast. In exceptions where pile driving of monopile foundations failed, drilling was used to form the monopile foundations.

IEC 1A class Vestas V90-3.0 MW wind turbines were used, mounted on a 75 m tower connected to 4.75 m (15 ft 7 in) monopiles supplied by a Sif/Smulders joint venture. Turbine to offshore substation electric connection were at 33 kV, with the voltage stepped up to 132 kV at an offshore substation supplied by Areva T&D (transformer), Sif/Smulders (superstructure and monopile) and designed by KBR and Mott MacDonald. Cables were supplied by Prysmian (33 kV) and Nexans (132 kV).

Construction of the wind farm was completed in June 2006 with the first power generated in March 2006. The operator is Barrow Offshore Wind Limited, owned by Centrica and Ørsted.

== Operation ==
Since 2008 (to 2012) the farm operated at between 30 and 40% capacity factor, generating between 240 and 320 GWh of electrical energy per year. Its levelised cost has been estimated at £87/MWh.

In 2011 regulatory changes required Ørsted/Centrica to divest the electrical transmission assets of the wind farm, which were sold to TC Barrow OFTO Ltd. for £34 million.

In 2014 Ørsted acquired Centrica's 50% holding in the wind farm.

== See also ==
- Ormonde Wind Farm, Walney Wind Farm, West of Duddon Sands Wind Farm – other nearby wind farms in the Irish Sea
- List of offshore wind farms in the United Kingdom
- List of tallest buildings and structures in Barrow-in-Furness
