= Biggar, Cumbria =

Village in Cumbria, England

Coordinates: 54.086°N 3.243°W

Biggar
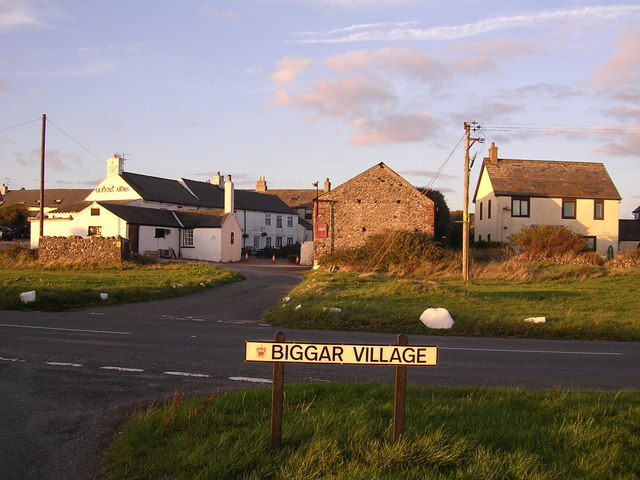
- Biggar Village

- Location in Barrow-in-Furness Borough Location within Cumbria
- OS grid reference: SD186662
- Unitary authority: Westmorland and Furness
- Ceremonial county: Cumbria
- Region: North West
- Country: England
- Sovereign state: United Kingdom
- Post town: BARROW-IN-FURNESS
- Postcode district: LA14
- Dialling code: 01229
- Police: Cumbria
- Fire: Cumbria
- Ambulance: North West
- UK Parliament: Barrow and Furness

Biggar is a village towards the south of Walney Island in Cumbria, England. Along with the village of North Scale, it is the oldest settlement on the island. It now forms part of the Westmorland and Furness.

Furness Abbey records from 1292 mention a grange at Biggar, of around 100 acres (0.40 km^{2}) in size. Biggar Dyke was built in the Sixteenth century [when the village was part of Dalton Parish] as coastal defence for the village and island. The first mention of the name the 'Queen's Arms' was in 1869 to distinguish it from the recently opened 'New Inn' in the village although it was a beer house as early as 1753.

Biggar has remained outside of the main urban limits of Walney and Barrow-in-Furness, and is still a small farming village. It lies on the eastern coast of Walney, to the north of a nature reserve, containing one of England's few oyster farms.

Biggar is mentioned alongside North Scale in the folk song 'Wa'ney Island Cockfight' The song has been recorded by Fiddler's Dram and Martin Wyndham-Reed.
