= Walney Lighthouse =

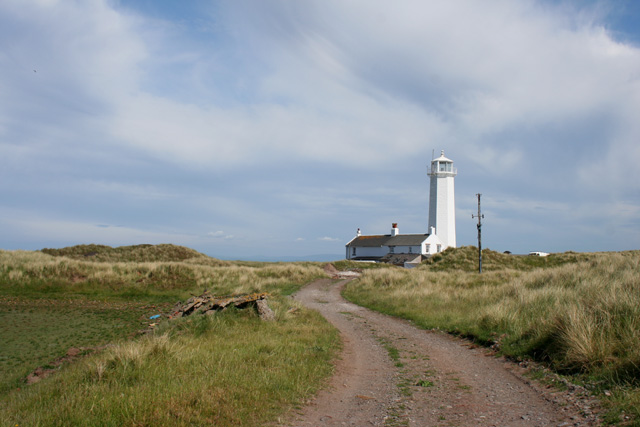
- The lighthouse photographed in 2008
- Location: Walney Island; Cumbria; England
- OS grid: SD2301962058
- Coordinates: 54.048670°N 3.177216°W

Tower
- Constructed: 1790 (first)
- Construction: stone tower
- Height: 24 m (79 ft)
- Shape: octagonal tower with balcony and lantern
- Markings: white tower and lantern
- Operator: Lancaster Port Commission
- Heritage: Grade II* listed building

Light
- First lit: 1804 (current)
- Focal height: 21 m (69 ft)
- Range: 23 nmi (43 km; 26 mi)
- Characteristic: LFl W 15s.

Walney Lighthouse is a functioning lighthouse located on Walney Island in Barrow-in-Furness, Cumbria, England. The current building dates to the early 19th-century and is Grade II* listed as well as being the southernmost man-made structure in Cumbria.

Completed in 1804, the stone lighthouse and its attached cottages actually predate Barrow and its port. The structure was built to replace a smaller wooden lighthouse that was constructed by the Lancaster Quay Commissioners in 1790 to aid in navigation towards the docks at Glasson close to Lancaster and the River Lune. It contained three 3-foot (0.91 m) reflectors mounted on a slowly revolving shaft; the reflectors consisted of a concave wooden frame covered with small pieces of mirrored glass.

The original lighthouse was destroyed by fire in 1803 and was swiftly replaced by the lighthouse of today. The lighthouse was designed by engineer E. Dawson. The optical system (as renewed in 1846) was a clockwork-driven rotating array of four Argand lamps backed by parabolic reflectors, which gave a white flash once a minute.

The lighthouse saw little change until 1909, when an acetylene gaslight system was installed, this was again changed in 1953 to a 'manned' electric light and rotation system (still with the four reflectors), flashing once every fifteen seconds. In 2003, when it was finally automated, Walney was the last manned lighthouse in England. It was also the last to be using a catoptric apparatus; that year the reflectors were replaced by a modern electric light unit.

== See also ==
- Listed buildings in Barrow-in-Furness
- List of lighthouses in England
