= Barrow-in-Furness power station =

Former power station in England

- Country: England, United Kingdom
- Location: Barrow-in-Furness, Lancashire
- Coordinates: 54°06′59″N 03°13′19″W
- Status: Decommissioned and demolished
- Construction began: 1896
- Commission date: 1899
- Decommission date: 1960
- Owners: Barrow-in-Furness Corporation (1899–1948); British Electricity Authority (1948–1955); Central Electricity Authority (1955–1957); Central Electricity Generating Board (1958–1963)
- Operator: As owner

Thermal power station
- Primary fuel: Coal
- Secondary fuel: Water (Coniston hydro-electric)
- Turbine technology: Steam driven reciprocating engines and steam turbines
- Cooling towers: 4

Power generation
- Units operational: (See text)
- Nameplate capacity: 23 MW (1958)
- Annual net output: 63.9 GWh (1954)

Barrow-in-Furness power station supplied electricity to the town of Barrow-in-Furness and the wider area of Lancashire, England from 1899 to about 1960. It was owned and operated by Barrow-in-Furness Corporation until the nationalisation of the UK electricity supply industry in 1948. The power station was redeveloped throughout its operational life. Barrow-in-Furness Corporation also operated Coniston hydro-electric power station.

== History ==
In 1894 Barrow-in-Furness Corporation applied for a provisional order under the Electric Lighting Acts to generate and supply electricity to the town. The Barrow-in-Furness Corporation Electric Lighting Order 1894 was granted by the Board of Trade and was confirmed by Parliament through the Electric Lighting Orders Confirmation (No. 1) Act 1894 (57 & 58 Vict. c. xlix). The power station was built in Buccleugh Street (54°06′59″N 3°13′19″W) adjacent to the railway line, it first supplied electricity to the town in 1899.

Coniston power station was developed as a small hydro-electric plant in 1932 with a single water turbine, a second turbine was added in 1937. The installation initially supplied power for Barrow County Council and latterly for the village of Coniston.

The 120 MW Roosecote power station east of the town centre was first commissioned in September 1953. This was more efficient than the old Barrow power station which was gradually run-down and decommissioned in about 1960.

== Equipment specification ==
At opening the station was equipped with three Babcock and Wilcox boilers feeding steam to three Brush Electrical Engineering Co. sets of 75 kW each. Power was distributed at 1100 Volts to three remote substations where it was reduced using motor generating sets.

In 1923 the steam generating plant at Barrow comprised:

- Coal-fired boilers generating up to 112,000 lb/h (14.11 kg/s) of steam, these supplied steam to:
- Generators
  - 3 × 75 kW reciprocating engines driving direct current (DC) generators
  - 2 × 150 kW reciprocating engines driving DC generators
  - 2 × 250 kW reciprocating engines driving DC generators
  - 1 × 1,000 kW steam turbo-alternator
  - 1 × 2,000 kW steam turbo-alternator
  - 1 × 3,000 kW steam turbo-alternator

These machines had a total generating capacity of 8,000 kW of alternating current and 1,025 kW direct current.

In January 1939 a Metropolitan-Vickers10,000 kW turbo alternator set was commissioned fed by a 75,000 Ib/hr boiler.

A variety of electricity supplies were available to consumers:

- 3-phase, 50 Hz AC at 6,300 Volts, 380 V and 220 V.
- Direct current at 500, 440 and 220 Volts.

Coal could be delivered to the station from a siding off the railway just south of Barrow-in-Furness railway station.

=== New plant, 1950s ===
New plant was commissioned over the operational life of the station. In the late 1950s the plant at the station comprised:

- Boilers:
  - 3 × Stirling boilers with chain grate stokers, all with a final steam pressure of 200 psi (13.8 bar), and with capacities of :
    - 30,000 lb/h (3.78 kg/s) at 650 °F (343 °C);
    - 55,000 lb/h (6.93 kg/s) at 700 °F (371 °C);
    - 90,000 lb/h (11.3 kg/s) at 700 °F (371 °C)

The boilers had a total evaporative capacity of 175,000 lb/h (22.0 kg/s), and supplied steam to:

- Turbo-alternators:
  - 1 × Metropolitan Vickers 10 MW turbo-alternator, with Vickers condensing plant
  - 1 × Metropolitan Vickers 7 MW turbo-alternator, with Vickers condensing plant
  - 1 × Howden-Siemens 1 MW turbo-alternator, with Willans and Robinson condensing plant
  - 1 × Howden-Siemens 3 MW turbo-alternator, with Worthington Simpsons condensing plant
  - 1 × British Thomson-Houston 2 MW turbo-alternator, with Cole, Merchant and Morley's surface condensing plant

The total installed generating capacity was 23 MW, with an output capacity of 14 MW.

Condenser cooling water was cooled in three wooden cooling towers with a combined capacity of 0.45 million gallons per hour (0.57 m^{3}/s) plus one concrete cooling tower with a capacity of 1.0 million gallons per hour (1.26 m^{3}/s).

The corporation also operated Coniston water turbine generating station at Coniston. This comprised 2 × 150 kW Gilkes-Metropolitan-Vickers water turbo-alternator sets. These generated current at 450 Volts.

== Operations ==
=== Operating data 1921–23 ===
The operating data for the period 1921–23 is shown in the table:

Barrow-in-Furness power station operating data 1921–23
Electricity Use	Units	Year		
Electricity Use	Units	1921	1922	1923
Lighting and domestic use	MWh	1,877	2,003	1,632
Public lighting use	MWh	57.1	57.3	75.7
Traction	MWh	794	733	599
Power use	MWh	6,553	4,092	5,127
Total use	MWh	9,282	6,886	7,434
Load and connected load
Maximum load	kW	4,525	4,400	3,970
Total connections	kW	15,003	15,834	15,825
Load factor	Per cent	30.9	24.3	27.3
Financial
Revenue from sales of current	£	–	73,447	70,613
Surplus of revenue over expenses	£	–	26,112	34,496

Under the terms of the Electricity (Supply) Act 1926 (16 & 17 Geo. 5. c. 51) the Central Electricity Board (CEB) was established in 1926. The CEB identified high efficiency ‘selected’ power stations that would supply electricity most effectively; Barrow was designated a selected station. The CEB also constructed the national grid (1927–33) to connect power stations within a region.

=== Operating data 1946 ===
Barrow-in-Furness and Coniston power stations operating data for 1946 is given below.

Barrow-in-Furness and Coniston power stations operating data, 1946
Station	Load factor per cent	Max output load MW	Electricity supplied GWh	Thermal efficiency per cent
Barrow	18.9	21.19	35.053	14.78
Coniston	38.7	0.321	1.072	––

The British electricity supply industry was nationalised in 1948 under the provisions of the Electricity Act 1947 (10 & 11 Geo. 6. c. 54). The Barrow-in-Furness electricity undertaking was abolished, ownership of Barrow-in-Furness and Coniston power stations were vested in the British Electricity Authority, and subsequently the Central Electricity Authority and the Central Electricity Generating Board (CEGB). At the same time the electricity distribution and sales responsibilities of the Barrow-in-Furness electricity undertaking were transferred to the North Western Electricity Board (NORWEB). At the time of nationalisation the undertaking supplied 23,825 customers over an area of 208 square miles (539 square kilometres).

=== Operating data 1954–63 ===
Operating data for Barrow power station over the period 1954–59 is shown in the table:

Barrow-in-Furness power station operating data, 1954–59
Year	Running hours	Max output capacity MW	Electricity supplied GWh	Thermal efficiency per cent
1954	6482	20	63.9	15.90
1955	4123	20	42.9	15.09
1956	3487	20	30.2	14.86
1957	3225	14	19.7	14.86
1958	3446	14	24.4	15.61
1959	3642	14	23.0	14.80

Operating data for Coniston power station was as follows:

Coniston power station operating data, 1954–63
Year	Running hours or load factor (per cent)	Max output capacity kW	Electricity supplied MWh
1954	6190	300	750
1955	8730	300	1136
1956	8761	300	872
1957	8183	300	1039
1958	8315	300	987
1961	(39.5 %)	300	1037
1962	(36.4 %)	300	957
1963	(20.55 %)	300	540

== Closure ==
Barrow power station was decommissioned in about 1960. The buildings were subsequently demolished and the area has been redeveloped as housing.

Coniston power station was decommissioned in the 1960s.

== See also ==
- Timeline of the UK electricity supply industry
- List of power stations in England
