= Stemat Spirit =

Cable laying ship, launched in 2010

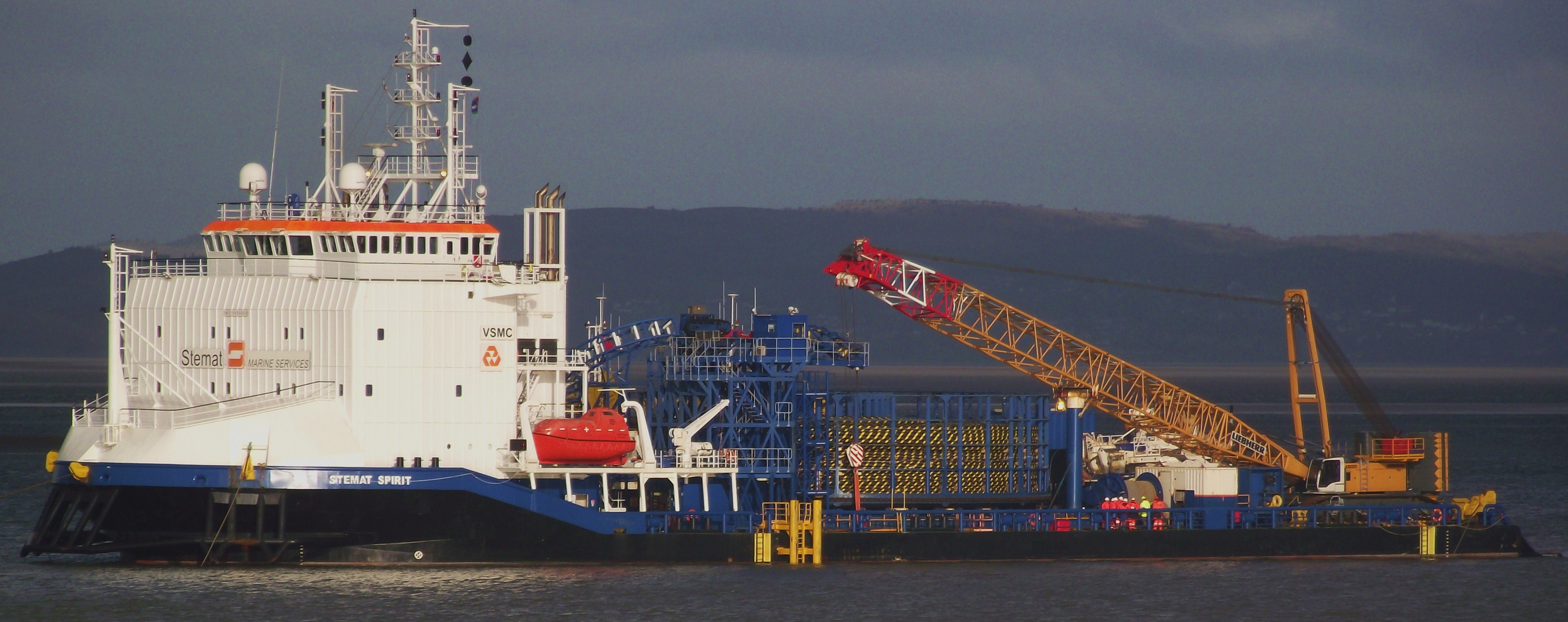
- Spirit cabling in Halfmoon bay, Heysham

History
- Name: Spirit
- Owner: Boskalis, Netherlands
- Operator: Boskalis
- Port of registry: Limassol
- Ordered: 2009
- Launched: 6 March 2010
- Commissioned: 2010
- Identification: IMO number: 9496458

General characteristics
- Tonnage: 4,102 GT
- Length: 90.0 m (295 ft 3 in)
- Beam: 28 m (91 ft 10 in)
- Draught: 3.2 m (10 ft 6 in)
- Installed power: 2 × Caterpillar 3512HD
- Propulsion: Stern thrusters: 2 x HPR 6111 Azimuth 1140 kW; Bow thruster: 2 x Caterpillar 3512B
- Speed: 9 knots (17 km/h; 10 mph)
- Capacity: 60

Spirit is a cable laying vessel (CLV). She is owned by Royal Boskalis Westminster N.V. She is a Bureau Veritas Hull Mach AUT UMS Dynapos AM/AT R Special Service Workboat Class.

The vessel has a six-point mooring system (using her DP2 system). The vessel can also be beached, allowing her to do cable work onshore, she uses the Hi-plough, which is the latest in marine technology, allowing a deeper burial for the cable.

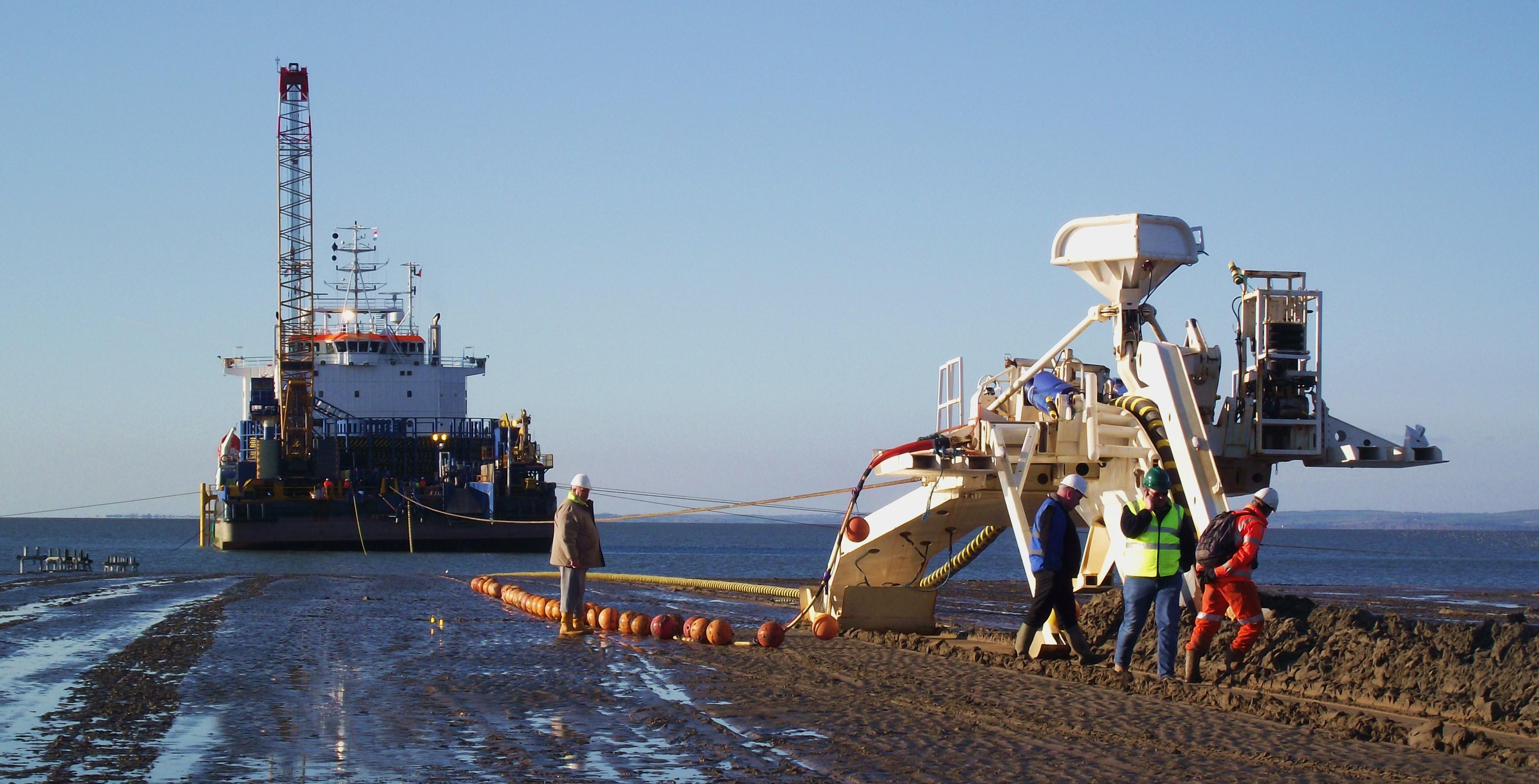
Spirit in January 2011

The Spirit has been used in a number of wind farm projects in the United Kingdom since 2010, the first of the offshore wind farms was Walney Wind Farm, which is separated into two units, Walney 1 + 2, also there was the London Array and West of Duddon Sands. The Spirit beached approximately 750 metres (2,460 ft) south of Heysham Port to lay the export cable for DONG Energy (26 & 27 June 2010). The export cable was pulled ashore in a joint effort between VolkerInfra, CM&I Marine and VBMS.

In 2013 the vessel was featured in a season 7 episode of the Canadian TV documentary series Mighty Ships.
