= Walney Wind Farm =

Offshore wind farm off the coast of Cumbria, England

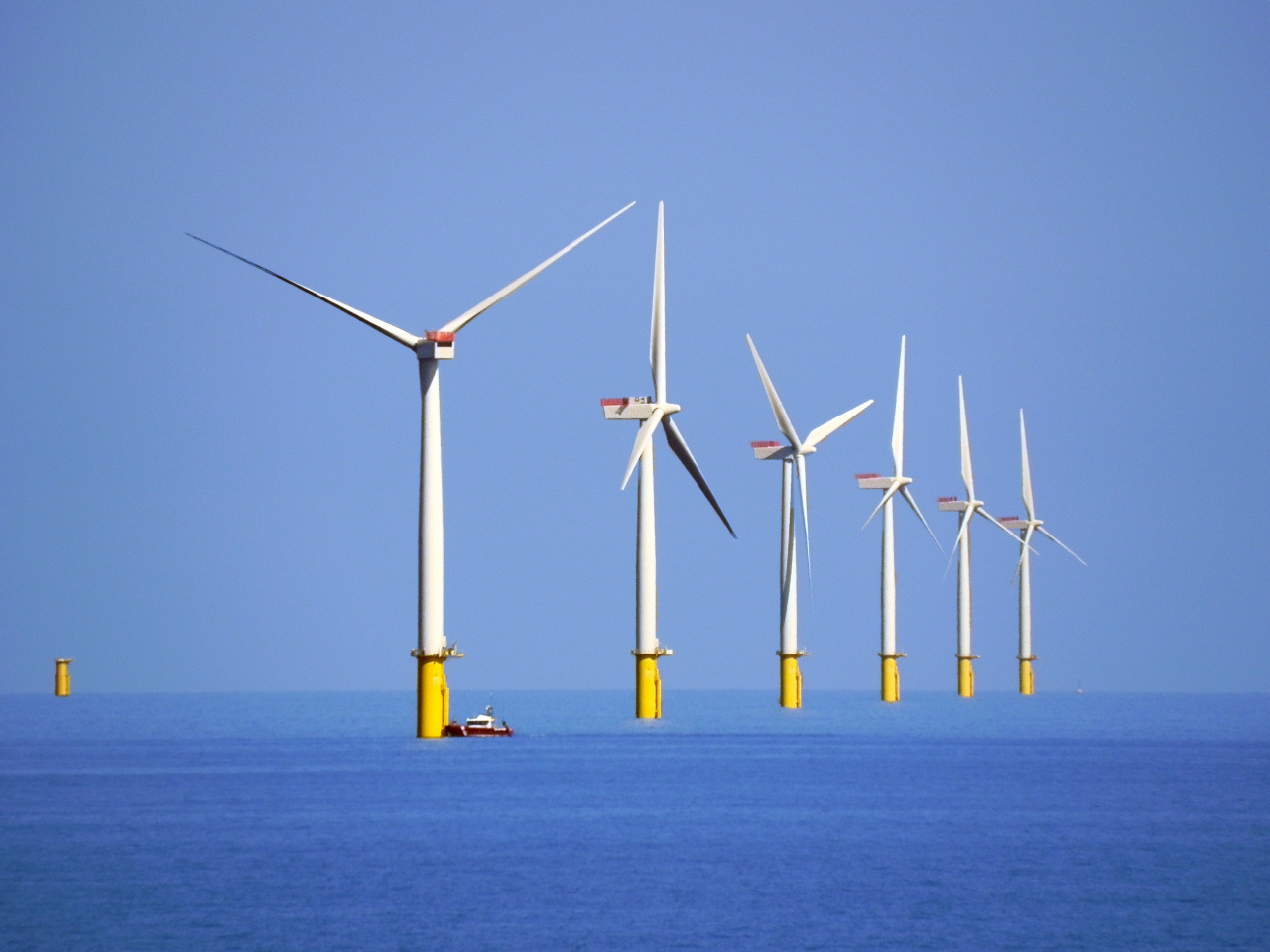
- Walney Wind Farm under construction in 2011
- Country: United Kingdom
- Location: 14km west of Walney Island off the coast of Cumbria
- Coordinates: 54°02′38″N 3°31′19″W
- Status: Operational
- Construction began: 2010
- Commission date: 2011 (phase 1); March 2012 (phase 2); September 2018 (extension)
- Owners: PGGM; Greencoat UK Wind; Ørsted

Wind farm
- Type: Offshore
- Rotor diameter: 107 m; 120 m; 154 m; 164 m
- Site area: 73 km^{2} (28 sq mi)

Power generation
- Units operational: 102 × 3.6 MW; 47 × 7 MW; 40 × 8.25 MW
- Make and model: MHI Vestas V164-8.25MW (40); Siemens Gamesa SWT-3.6-107 (51); Siemens Gamesa SWT-3.6-120 (51); Siemens Gamesa SWT-7.0-154 (47)
- Nameplate capacity: 367 MW (phase 1 and 2); 659 MW (extension); 1,026 MW (total)
- Capacity factor: 40 %; 43 %
- Annual net output: 1,300 GWh

External links
- Commons: Related media on Commons

Wind farm layout

Walney Wind Farms are a group of offshore wind farms 9 miles (14 km) west of Walney Island off the coast of Westmorland and Furness, England, in the Irish Sea. The group, operated by Ørsted (formerly Dong Energy), consists of Walney Phase 1, Phase 2 and the Walney Extension. The extension has a capacity of 659 MW and it was the world's second largest offshore wind farm in 2018.

The wind farms were developed by Walney (UK) Offshore Windfarms Limited, a partnership between DONG Energy and Scottish and Southern Energy. The farms, which are immediately northwest of the West of Duddon Sands Wind Farm and west of Ormonde Wind Farm, are in water depths ranging from 19m to 23m and cover an area of approximately 73 km^{2}.

Both of the first phases have 51 turbines giving a nameplate capacity of 367 MW. Until September 2012 it was the world's largest operational offshore wind farm, and regained this title when the expansion completed in September 2018. The first two phases were expected to generate about 1,300 GW·h/year of electricity, with a load factor of 43%. The Walney Extension opened in September 2018 with a further 87 turbines capable of generating 659 megawatts. And the area reaches 145 km^{2}.

== Development phases ==
Phase	Offshore construction start	Inaugurated	Turbines	Turbine model	Total capacity (MW)
Walney 1	2010	2011	51	Siemens SWT-3.6-107 (3.6 MW)	183.6
Walney 2	March 2011	March 2012	51	Siemens SWT-3.6-120 (3.6 MW)	183.6
Walney Extension	February 2017	June 2018	87	40 × MHI-Vestas 8.25 MW & 47 × Siemens Gamesa (7 MW)	659
Total			189		1026.2

== Construction ==
In 2004 DONG Energy was awarded a 50-year lease from The Crown Estate to develop a wind farm off Walney Island, as part of the second UK offshore wind farm tendering process known as "Round 2". The farm was constructed sequentially in two phases with overlapping installation activities to reduce the overall construction timeframe.

The project involved constructing the wind turbines and their foundations, building two offshore substations and installing two undersea power cables, one for each phase, and two short onshore cables to connect to two existing onshore electrical substations for connection into the UK National Grid. A cable was laid by Stemat Spirit. Phase 1 connects to a substation at Heysham and Phase 2 connects to substation at Stanah, south of Fleetwood. Both undersea cables pass close by Barrow Wind Farm. All the construction work was expected to take less than 2 years, with both phases operational by the end of 2011. On 11 July 2011 Phase 1 became operational, comprising 51 turbines with an installed capacity of 183.6 MW. Its levelised cost has been estimated at £120/MWh.

Walney 2 began sending power to the grid on 1 November 2011. In February 2012, DONG Energy claimed to have installed the 51 turbines in Walney 2 in 5 months and 14 days, including monopiles and complete turbines; about 3.25 days per turbine. Walney 1 took 7 months. The improvement is due to commonality of projects and resources. The wind farm was officially opened on 9 February 2012 by the new energy secretary, Ed Davey, MP, although the last of the 51 turbines in Walney 2 were only activated in April 2012.

== Walney Extension ==
In November 2014 DONG Energy was given development consent for an extension to the Walney offshore wind farm. The development consent allowed a maximum of 207 turbines to be added to the existing 102 turbines. The maximum generating capacity of the extension was said to be 750 MW although DONG was reported to be proceeding with a project based around 660 MW. Offshore construction began in 2017, onshore support construction having started in 2015. In 2015 DONG chose the 8 MW Vestas V164 for Phase 1, and the 7 MW Siemens gearless turbine for Phase 2. In April 2018, the final turbine of the 87 installed for Phase 1 was completed, with full operation commencing in September 2018.

== Incidents ==
In 2014 a dive vessel, owned by Danish firm Offshore Marine Services, was carrying out routine inspection work when an anchor cable broke and the ship hit one of 102 turbines installed at the Walney Offshore Wind Farm. The UK’s Maritime and Coastguard Agency surveyed the crash site and reported that a surface sheen stretching 33 feet wide and 0.7 nautical miles long was trailing the vessel. The agency said that, unlike heavier crude oil, the marine engine oil should evaporate or disperse naturally.

== See also ==
- List of offshore wind farms in the United Kingdom
- Wind power in the United Kingdom
