= Ormonde Wind Farm =

Wind farm in the Irish Sea

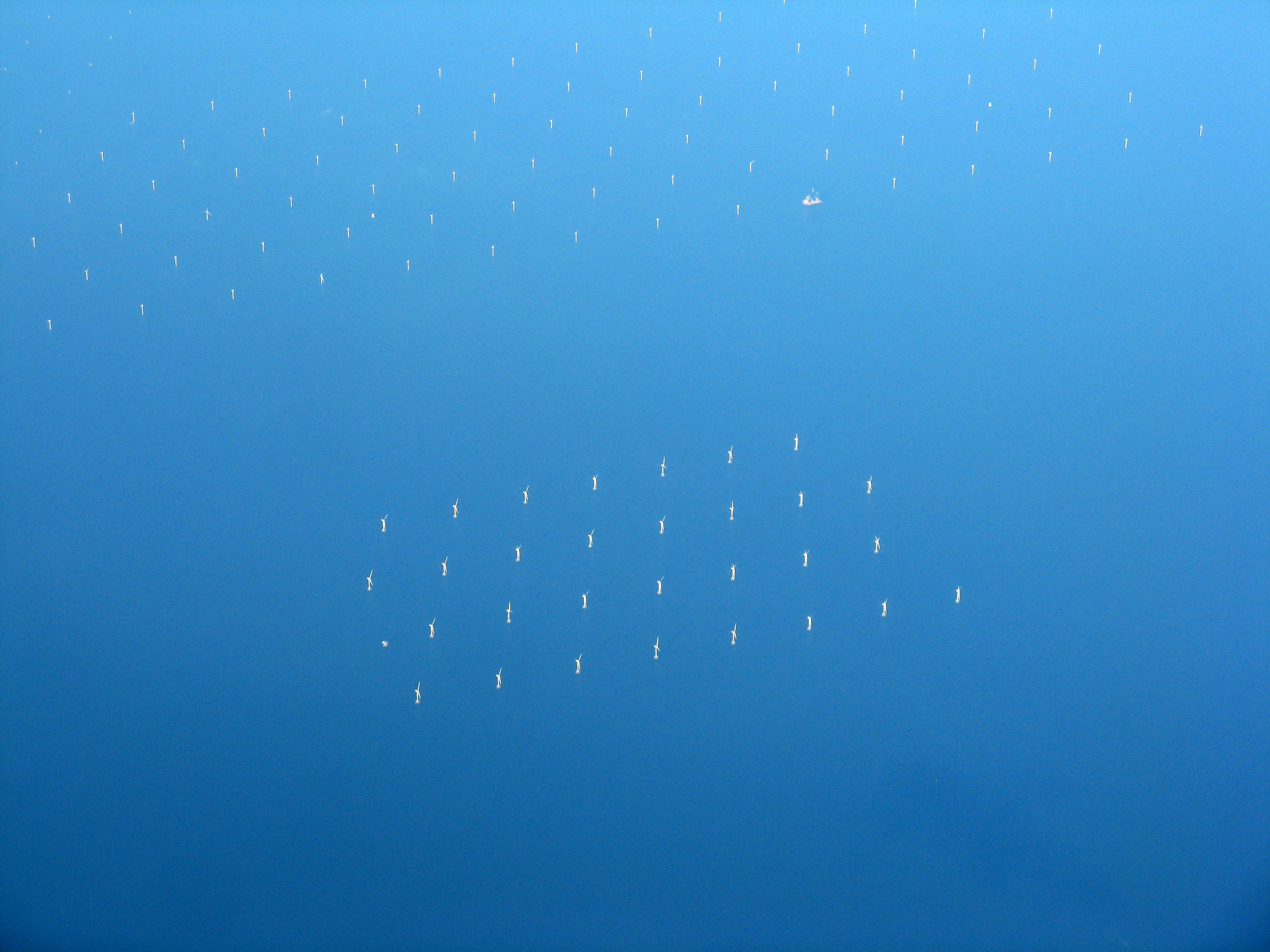
- Country: United Kingdom
- Location: West of Barrow-in-Furness, Irish Sea
- Coordinates: 54°06′N 3°24′W
- Status: Operational
- Construction began: May 2010
- Commission date: February 2012
- Owner: Vattenfall
- Operator: Vattenfall

Wind farm
- Type: Offshore
- Max. water depth: 17–21 m (56–69 ft)
- Distance from shore: 9.5 km (5.9 mi)
- Hub height: 100 m (328 ft)
- Rotor diameter: 126 m (413 ft)
- Site area: 8.7 km^{2} (3.4 sq mi)

Power generation
- Units operational: 30 × 5 MW
- Make and model: Senvion REpower 5M (30)
- Nameplate capacity: 150 MW
- Capacity factor: 38.5 %
- Annual net output: 500 GWh

External links
- Website: group.vattenfall.com/uk/what-we-do/our-projects/ormonde
- Commons: Related media on Commons

Wind farm layout

The Ormonde Wind Farm is a wind farm west of Barrow-in-Furness in the Irish Sea. The wind farm covers an area of 8.7 square kilometres (3.4 sq mi). It has a total capacity of 150 MW and is expected to produce around 500 GWh of electricity per year.

== Planning ==
Originally the Ormonde project was planned as a hybrid wind and natural gas powered electricity generation plant supplied from the Ormonde South and Ormonde North gas fields. The project was developed by Eclipse Energy. In 2008, Vattenfall bought Eclipse Energy and the project was developed as wind energy only. The project management company throughout the project has been Offshore Design Engineering.

== Construction ==
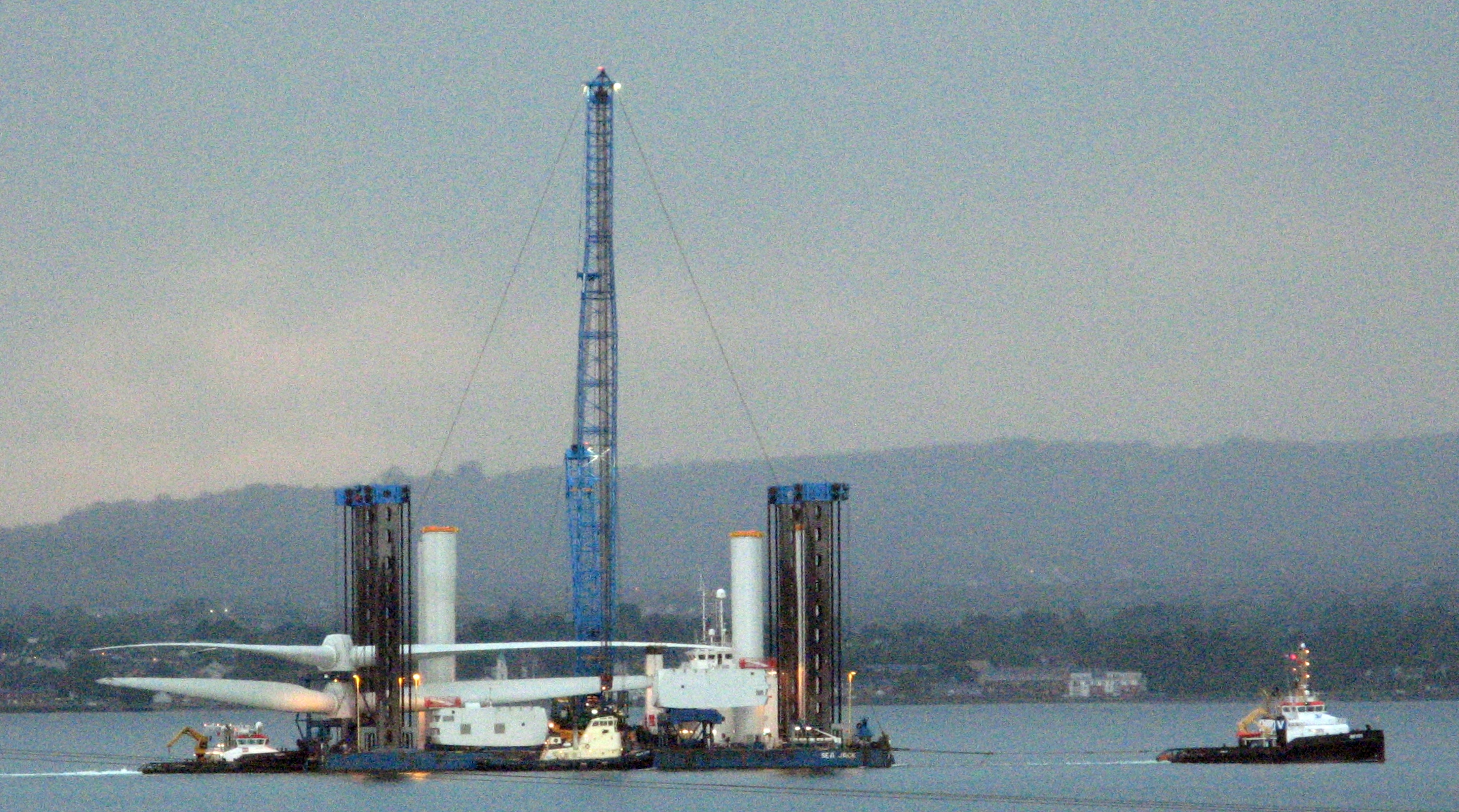
The SeaJack installation vessel, Belfast Lough, 30 May 2011 en route from Harland and Wolff

Construction started in 2010 and was completed in August 2011. Prysmian provided submarine power cable connections including 27 km of 33 kV inter-array cables to connect the wind turbines and a 42 km of 132 kV export cable to connect the wind farm to the substation. 30 turbines each with 5 MW nameplate capacity are provided by REpower and electrical works were to be carried out by Areva. Steel foundations for generators were developed and designed by OWEC Tower and produced by Burntisland Fabrications. Logistics and assembly services are provided by Harland and Wolff. Generators were installed by A2SEA. The first four steel foundations were delivered in July 2010, and were installed by a joint venture of Scaldis and Geosea BV.

The wind farm was commissioned on 22 February 2012 and is now fully operational.

Its levelised cost has been estimated at £149/MWh.

== Incident ==
In 2021, a rotor and blades from a wind turbine fell into the sea following a maintenance error. The components broke up and debris has been washed up on nearby beaches.

== See also ==
- Barrow Offshore Wind Farm
- List of tallest buildings and structures in Barrow-in-Furness
- Wind power in the United Kingdom
