= Walney Bridge =

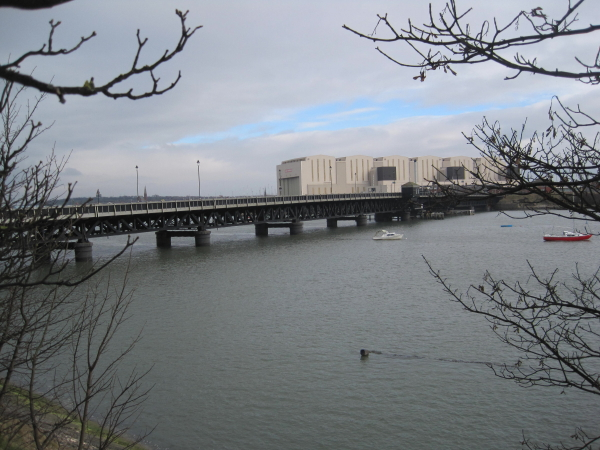
- Walney bridge viewed from Walney Island at high tide
- Coordinates: 54.1076°N 3.2435°W
- Carries: Motor vehicles Trams (until 1932); Pedestrians and bicycles
- Crosses: Walney Channel
- Locale: Barrow-in-Furness
- Official name: Jubilee Bridge
- Other name: Walney Bridge
- Maintained by: Westmorland and Furness Council

Characteristics
- Design: Bascule bridge
- Total length: 343 metres (1,125 ft)
- Width: 15 metres (49 ft)

History
- Opened: 30 July 1908

Statistics
- Toll: Until 1935

Location
- Interactive map of Walney Bridge

Walney Bridge, officially Jubilee Bridge, (Note: Another Jubilee Bridge can be found in Barrow on the former route of the A590 on Abbey Road near Furness General Hospital and the Junction with Rating Lane where the road crosses Dane Gill Beck.) is a bascule bridge in Barrow-in-Furness, Cumbria, England. Completed in 1908, it spans Walney Channel, linking Barrow Island to Walney Island. The bridge carries the A590 trunk road, which has its western terminus on Walney.

== History ==
Walney Bridge as it appeared in the early 1900s (decade)

Talks began in 1897 to how feasible the construction of a bridge connecting Barrow to Walney would be. At the time, Walney residents were frustrated by the fact that they had to use a ferry to traverse the Walney Channel, and they also saw it as an opportunity to commemorate the Diamond Jubilee of Queen Victoria. When the bridge was finally approved many companies fought for the building contract, with Sir William Arrol & Co. winning it. Construction of the £175,000 (in that time) bridge began in mid-1905 and it was finally opened by Barrow mayoress Mrs. T. F. Taylor, also present on the day was mayor Mr T.F. Butler on 30 July 1908 Furness whisper.

For 27 years Walney Bridge was a toll bridge until 4 April 1935, when the Duchess of York officially renamed it Jubilee Bridge to mark the Silver Jubilee of George V, as recorded on a plaque on the bridge, and handed it to the townspeople. During World War II, the bascule bridge was lifted every night to ensure that anyone who made landfall on Walney was unable to reach Barrow by crossing the bridge and reaching its shipbuilding facilities. The bridge is now over 100 years old, and in 2008 Cumbria County Council spent £1 million on renovating the bridge and repainting it for its centenary celebration. The bridge is not to be confused with Abbey Road's Jubilee Bridge, which is also in Barrow and is a Grade II listed structure.

=== The Blue Bridge ===
Walney Jubilee Bridge was often nicknamed by local residents the blue bridge in relation to its colour and to distinguish it from the other bridge situated on Barrow. These nicknames, however, were ended when in 2008 the bridge was painted gold and black.

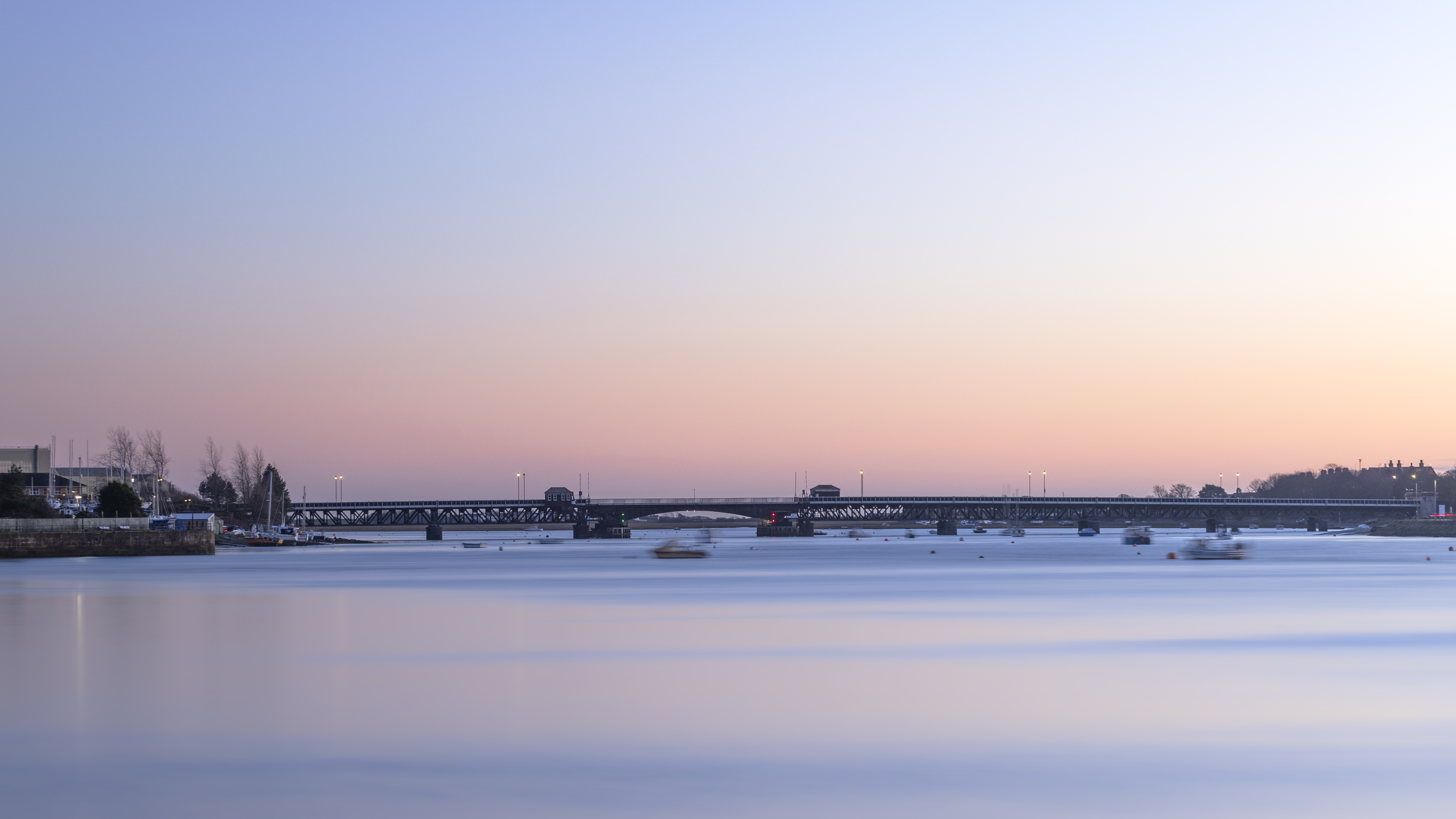
Walney Bridge after sunset looking southwards down Walney Channel.

== Centenary celebrations ==
The bridge celebrated its 100th anniversary with significant renovation and a night of fireworks.

== In fiction ==
The bridge was the link to the fictional island of Sodor, home of Thomas the Tank Engine et al. in The Railway Series books by the Reverend W. Awdry. In the Railway Series, the bridge opened much later in 1977.

== See also ==
- List of bridges in the United Kingdom
