= Martyn Wyndham-Read =

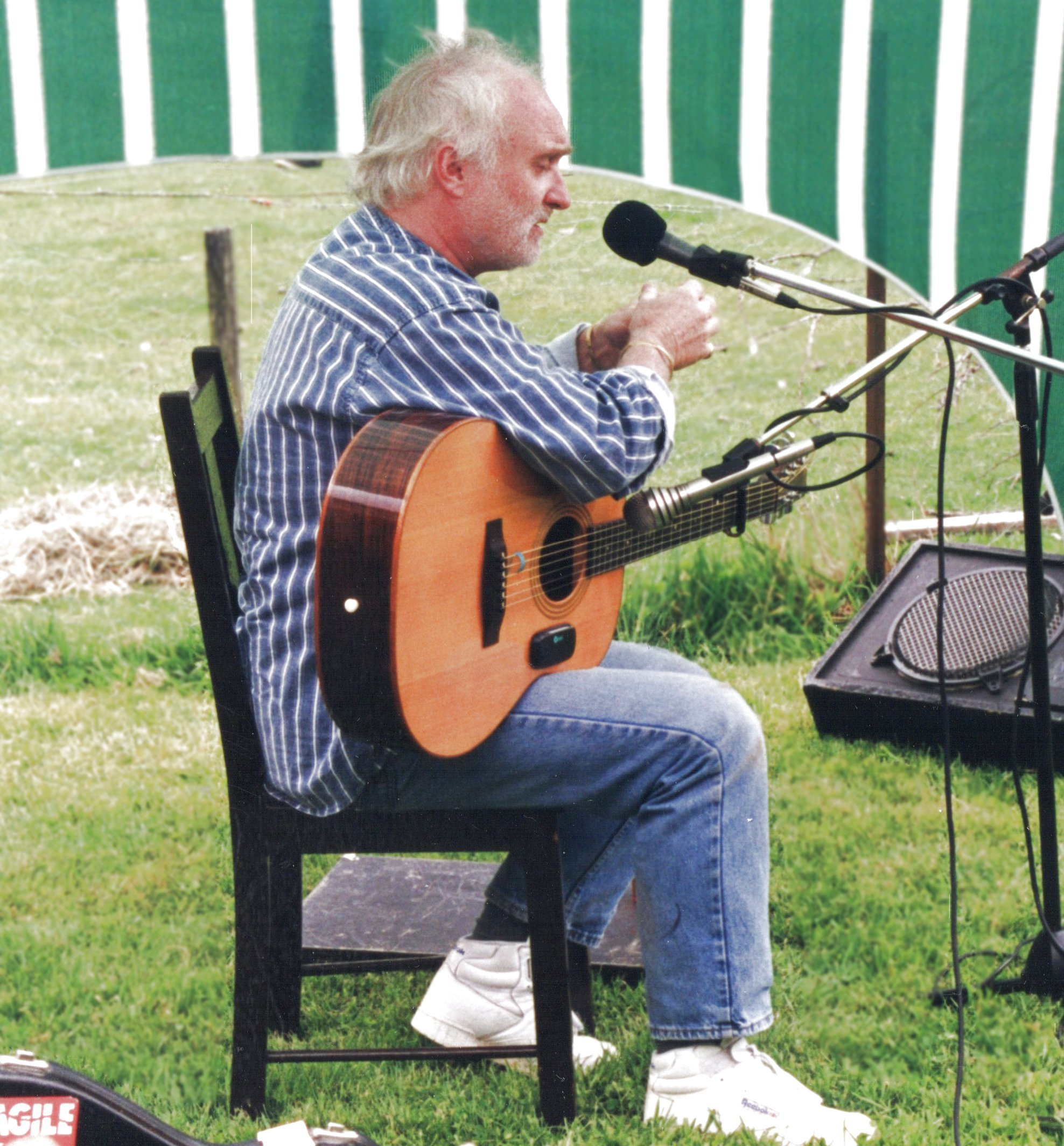
- Martyn Wyndham-Read on tour in Tasmania, Australia, 1997

Background information
- Born: Arnold Martyn Wyndham-Read; 23 August 1942 (age 84); Crawley, Sussex, England
- Genres: Australian folk
- Occupations: Singer-songwriter; folklorist
- Instruments: Singing; guitar
- Labels: Topic; Wynding Road
- Website: martynwyndhamread.com

Arnold Martyn Wyndham-Read (born 23 August 1942, Crawley, Sussex, England) is an English folk singer, who was a collector and singer of Australian folk music. He lived and worked in Australia from 1958 to 1967 and was subsequently a regular visitor to the country.

== Biography ==
Martyn Wyndham-Read grew up on a Sussex farm; he heard the village blacksmith singing local songs. He formed a skiffle band with fellow villagers, he "learnt to play guitar and belted out Lonnie Donegan-like versions of 'Down by the Riverside' and other American Negro songs."

In 1958. Wyndham-Read moved from Sussex to Australia where he worked on Emu Springs sheep station, near Burra, South Australia. There he heard, first hand, the old folks songs sung by station hands and was captivated by these. He performed them at rural pubs, and decided to learn more about them and where they came from. He initially moved to Sydney and then to Melbourne to join the folk song revival during the early 1960s.

Craig McGregor of The Canberra Times described his style, "[he] tends to sing his songs slowly, giving each line its due weight and lining the melody out with great clarity. He is helped in this by a voice which rarely wavers from the pitch; but folk singing is a subtle art, and just having a good voice is not enough... He sings English, Irish and Australian ballads with equal authority; in fact he is one of the few singers who can do justice to our bush-ranging and convict songs. His style is polished and rounded, full-blown almost, yet it escapes the theatricality which seems to creep into the work of some of our classically-trained folk singers."

In August 1964, Wyndham-Read recorded material for a various artists' album, Australian Folk Festival, which appeared on the Score label, owned by Peter Mann. McGregor observed, "it is one of the best records of Australian folk music available, and it has a stirring, swelling rendition of 'Ben Hall' by Martyn which alone would justify buying the record. Martyn also sings with Brian Mooney on 'Roddy McCorley', a song from the 1798 Irish rebellion, and 'Get Me Down My Filling Knife', a reworking by Brendan and Dominic Behan of the old Dublin street ballad, 'Get Me Down My Pettycoat'." Other contributions on the album are from: Tina Lawton, Trevor Lucas, Paul Marks and Lenore Somerset.

Wyndham-Read returned to England in 1967 and met up with singer and song collector, Bert Lloyd, who had also spent time in Australia. He was asked by Lloyd to contribute to an album, Leviathan, on the Topic label. Soon after Wyndham-Read started recording for Bill Leader.

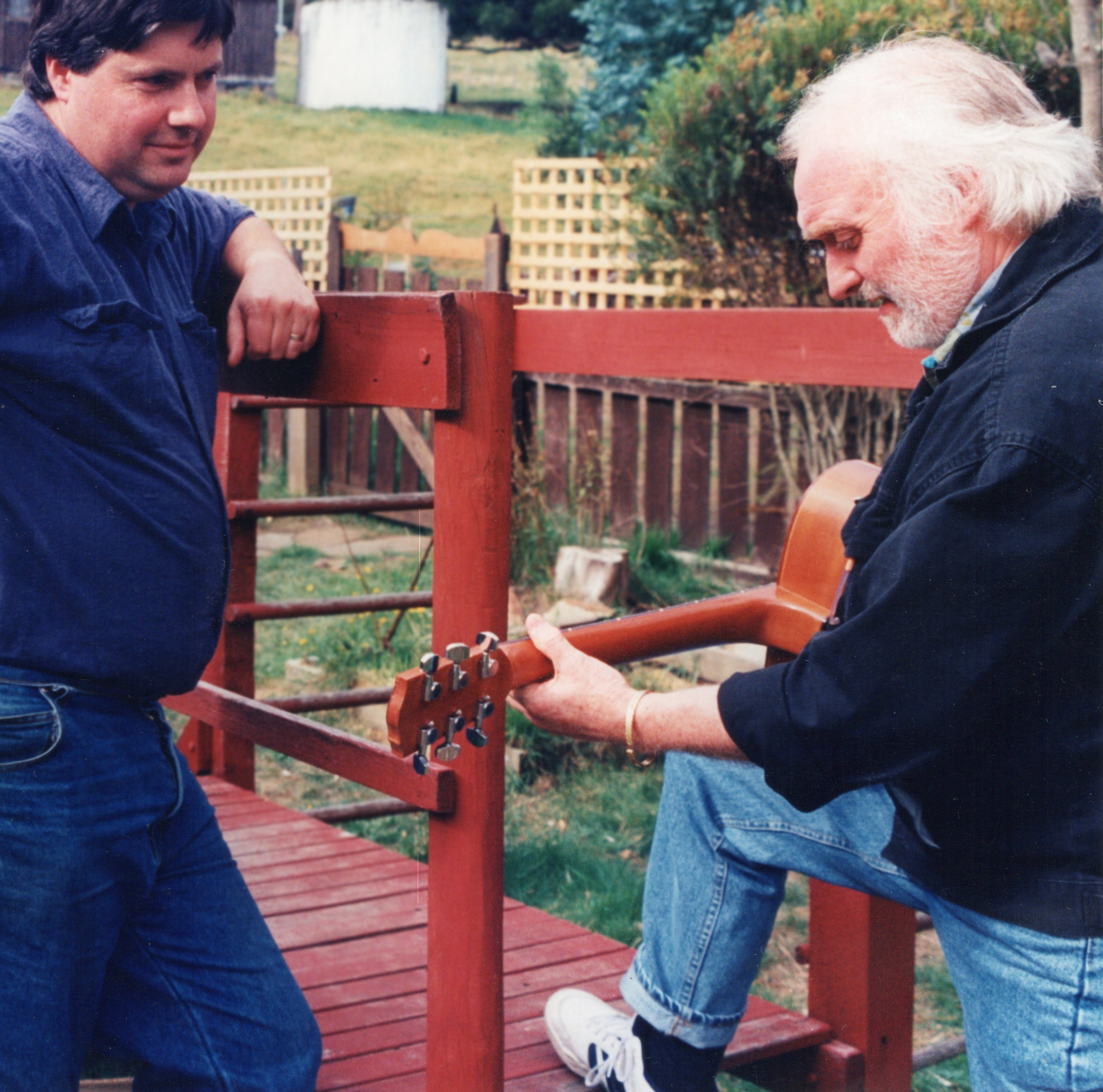
Martyn Wyndham-Read (right) with Tasmanian instrument maker John Bushby, Australia, 1995

In the early 1970s he started a series of Maypoles to Mistletoe concerts which portray the seasons of the year through song, music, dance and verse. This show has been performed for the last 40 years and has in itself become a tradition at Christmas time in and around the Sussex area; an album of the same name also featuring fellow performers Geoff & Pennie Harris and Arky's Toast was released on Trailer Records in 1975. In 2003, he performed with his granddaughter, Hatti, at such a concert. He was still performing there in 2013.

Wyndham-Read was also the instigator of the Song Links Project, these are two-book-and-CD sets which celebrate English traditional songs and their Australian variants, and Song Links 2 compares and contrasts English traditional songs with versions that have travelled over the Atlantic and been sung (and further developed) in North America with a cast of folk performers representing the cream of singers specialising in traditional songs from their own country.

Wyndham-Read was working in 2010 with Shirley Collins and Pip Barnes on Down the Lawson Track featuring stories, poems and songs of the Australian poet, Henry Lawson.

He has produced over 40 albums and appeared at folk festivals in Australia, and around the world. Wyndham-Read and his wife, Danni, a visual artist, have four children and six grandchildren.

== Bibliography ==
- Wyndham-Read, Martyn; Brown, Chris; Farr, Jim; Wyndham-Read, Danni; Brown, Helen; Kent, Mary; Bishop, Iris (2008), Maypoles to Mistletoe: the Book of the Show, Educational Printing Services Ltd, ISBN 978-1-905637-35-5

== Discography ==
- Moreton Bay (1963, Score Records, Australia. Limited edition 100 CDs re-issued 1999. Martyn Wyndham-Read on 6 tracks)
- Australian Songs (1966, w/ The Bush Band, W&G Records, Australia)
- Ned Kelly And That Gang (1970, Trailer)
- Martyn Wyndham-Read (1971, Trailer)
- Songs and Music of the Redcoats (1971, w/ The Druids and Gerry Fox, Argo)
- Harry the Hawker is Dead (1973, Argo)
- The Valiant Sailor (1973, with Frankie Armstrong, A.L. Lloyd, Roy Harris)
- Sea Shanties (1974, with A. L. Lloyd, Ian Manuel, Bernard Wrigley, Roy Harris)
- Maypoles to Mistletoe (1975 w/ Geoff & Pennie Harris and Ark's Toast, Trailer)
- English Sporting Ballads (1976 w/ The High Level Ranters); reissued 1988 as CMBCD 002)
- Ballad Singer (1978, Autogram - Germany)
- Andy's Gone (1979, with Dave & Toni Arthur, Broadside)
- Emu Plains (1981, Fellside)
- A Rose from the Bush (1984, Greenwich Village)
- The Old Songs (1984, Greenwich Village)
- Yuletracks (1986, Greenwich Village)
- Across the Line (1986, Greenwich Village)
- Mussels on a Tree (1992, Fellside)
- Sunlit Plains (1995, Fellside)
- Beneath a Southern Sky (1997, w/ No Man's Band, Fellside)
- Maypoles to Mistletoe (1998, Country Branch)
- Undiscovered Australia (1996, Music Pangaea) - compilation from Emu Plains, Mussels on a Tree, Sunlit Plains
- Beyond the Red Horizon (1999, w/ No Man's Band, Fellside)
- Where Ravens Feed (2001, w/ No Man's Band, Fellside)
- Song Links (2003, Fellside)
- Song Links 2 (2005, Fellside)
- Oceans in the Sky (2005, w/ No Man's Band, Fellside)
- Jackeroo (2008, w/ No Man's Band, Wynding Road Music)
- Back to You (2010, w/ No Man's Band, Wynding Road Music)
- Starlit Skies (2012, w/ No Man's Band, Wynding Road Music)
- Seasons of the Year (Maypoles to Mistletoe) (2012, Wynding Road Music)
- Away to Tintinara (2018, w/ No Man's Band, Wynding Road Music)
