= Nobiskrug =

Shipyard in Rendsburg, Germany

Nobiskrug GmbH
- Company type: Subsidiary
- Industry: Shipbuilding
- Founded: 1905
- Headquarters: Rendsburg, Germany
- Products: Luxury yachts
- Owner: Flensburger Schiffbau-Gesellschaft
- Number of employees: ~300
- Website: www.nobiskrug.com

Nobiskrug is a shipyard located on the Eider River in Rendsburg, Germany, specialized in building innovative, custom-made luxury superyachts.

In 2020 it celebrated its 115 years of operation.

== History ==
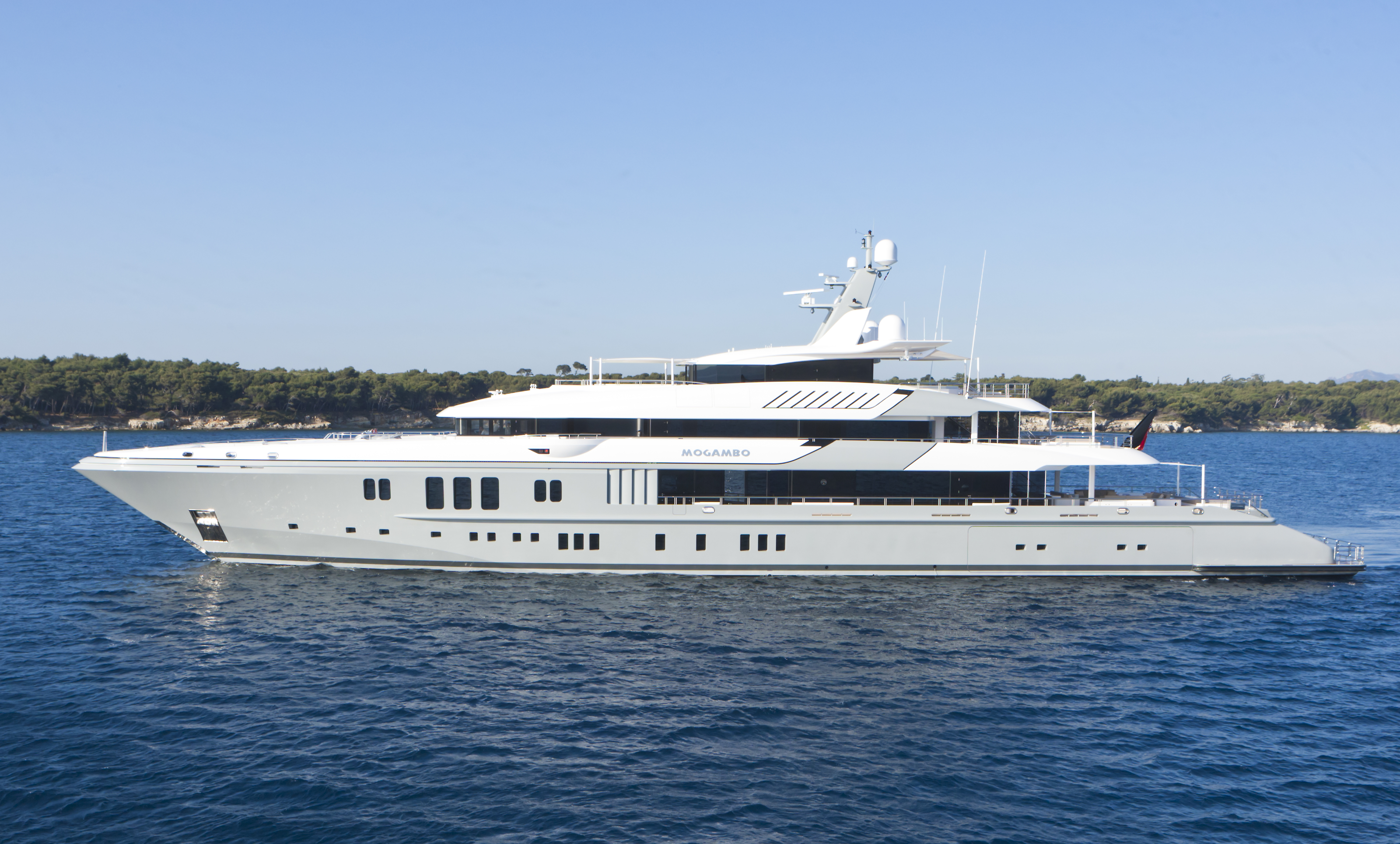
Motoryacht MOGAMBO

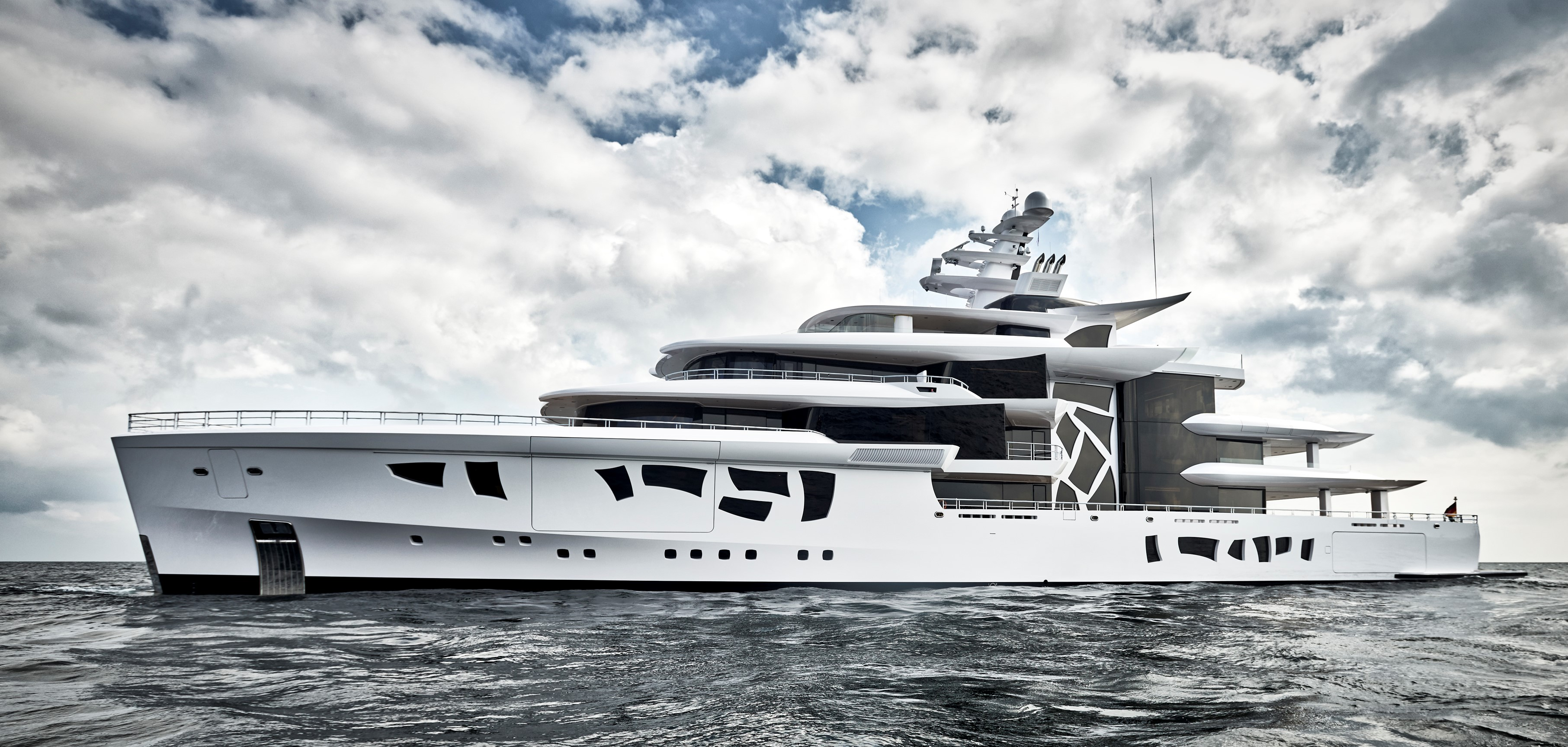
Motoryacht ARTEFACT

Nobiskrug was founded in 1905 by Otto Storck. The company changed to a limited liability company (GmbH), November 12, 1908, and a canal expansion work brought a steady stream of waterway construction vessels to the shipyard for repairs and refits. By the start of World War I, the shipyard had built a total of 70 vessels, mainly pontoons, barges and lighters.

During the war, the company built a number of auxiliary ships for the Kaiserliche Marine and started building minesweepers. They also launched its first two cargo steamboats in 1917 for German owners.

Germany's defeat in World War I temporarily halted the country's export shipbuilding industry, but the company switched production to deep-sea fishing steamers and later, again, cargo steamers. In 1930 the company scored a major coup with contracts for a series of three-mast schooner yachts.

During the period from 1935 to 1939, the shipyard supplied the German Ministry of Finance with three customs cruisers, the Nettelbeck, the York, and the Freiherr von Stein. Shortly before and during World War II, the Kriegsmarine and Luftwaffe placed orders with Nobiskrug for a range of auxiliary ships including several ocean-going tugs and tankers.

During the immediate post-war years, the company concentrated on ship conversions and repairs. From 1945 to 1955 advanced in building larger vessels. In 1958, the cargo ship MS Bleichen was launched, the ship would go on to become a museum ship in Hamburg.

In 1963 the shipyard delivered the then highly sophisticated navy training ship Deutschland. One year later, Nobiskrug built its first ferry, the Prins Bertil. Four more ferries were built up until 1968. This period also saw the completion of a number of conventional freighters and asphalt tankers as well as heavy goods, RoRo vessels and ferries. The early 1980s saw the construction of the research vessel Polarstern, and the diving support vessels Seabex One and Seaway Condor. In the mid-1980s the fortunes of the shipyard took a turn for the worse, leading ultimately to the verge of financial collapse in 1986.

Under these difficult circumstances, the yard lengthened the ocean cruise liner Berlin (Ship, 1980) operated by Peter Deilmann Cruises. This ship is known to German TV viewers as cruise line in the German version of the Love Boat. The successful completion of this project was a sign of better things to come.

Nobiskrug was acquired in 1987 by Howaldtswerke-Deutsche Werft and the shipyard was modernized into a compact shipyard, its maritime division specialising exclusively in repairs and conversions. Staffing levels were reduced dramatically, from more than 1,200 at the start of the 1980s to approximately 400.

In 1997 the shipyard supplied the forward half of the passenger ship MS Deutschland and then began work on its first superyacht, the 303-foot (92m) mega-yacht Tatoosh, which it completed in the summer of 2000.

Today Nobiskrug's focus is on engineering, construction, and refit of custom-built superyachts. In the past decade Nobiskrug has delivered some of the award-winning superyachts including Sycara V, Triple Seven, Sapphire, Mogambo, Dytan (project 783), Odessa II.

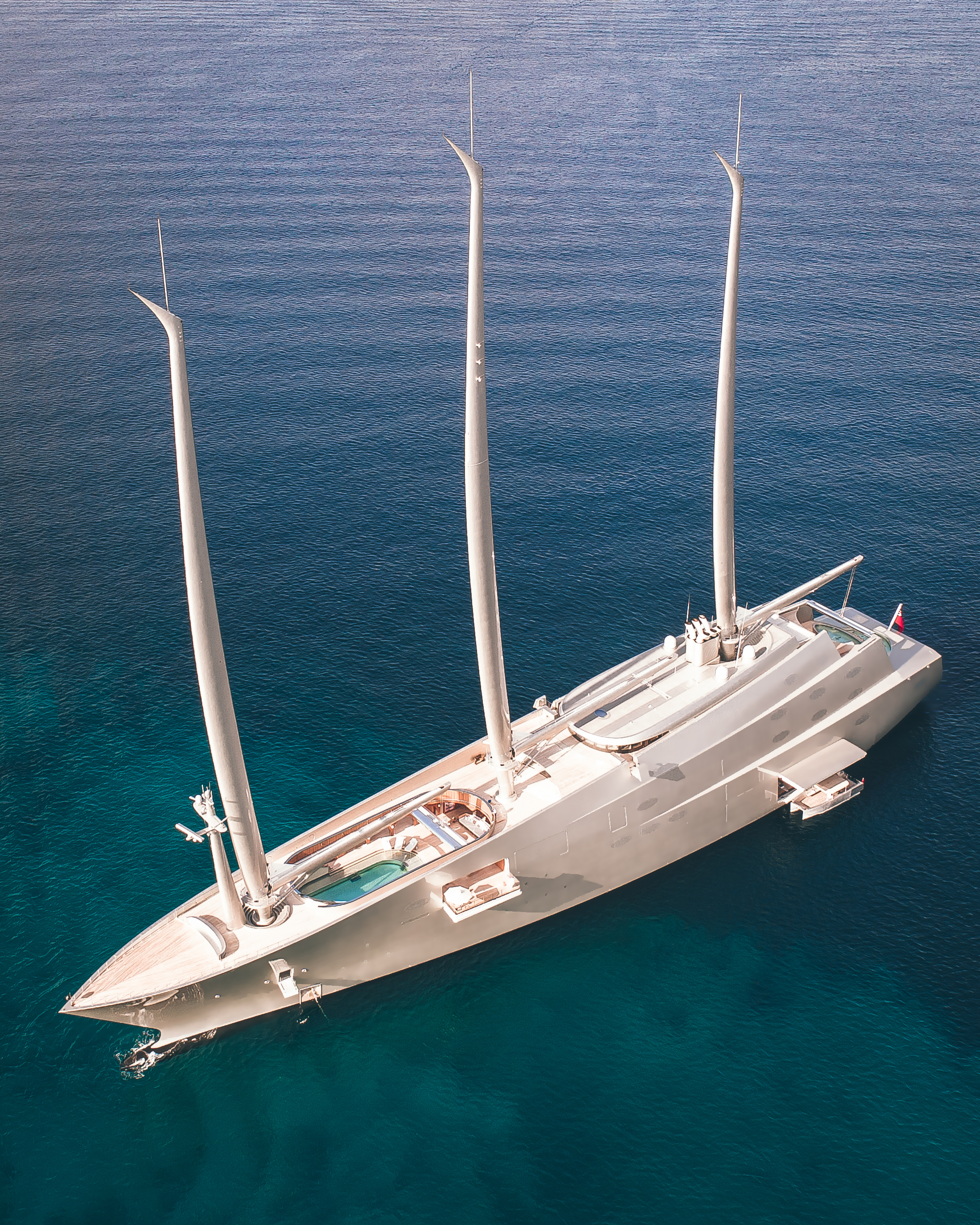
Sailing Yacht A

In 2017 Nobiskrug launched the sail-assisted motoryacht Sailing Yacht A, the largest private sailing yacht ever built. Measuring almost 143 m and a gross tonnage of about 12.600, Sailing Yacht A became one of the most impressive PYC superyachts in the world in terms of design and technology.

Nobiskrug's latest delivery in 2020 is its first hybrid superyacht, 80-meter Artefact. Artefact's many environmentally-friendly features include diesel-electric variable-speed Azipod-propulsion, dynamic-positioning system, wastewater recycling system for re-use as technical water, batteries and solar panels. At 2.999 GT, Artefact is the biggest-volume 80-meter superyacht in the world.

Currently there are several yacht projects under construction like the 77m Black Shark or the 62m long superyacht with the Espen Oeino design. This year the Rendsburg shipyard Nobiskrug is celebrating 115 years of shipbuilding since its foundation in 1905.

In 2021 the company filed for insolvency - which according to the German law allows business restructuring. The shipyard's insolvency is partially a result of the Coronavirus pandemic.

In July 2021, North German shipbuilding company Flensburger Schiffbau-Gesellschaft was announced as the new owner of Nobiskrug.

In 2024 Nobiskrug became insolvent again and was taken over by Lürssen.

== Yachts ==
Was the longest yacht upon completion.

Year	Original name	Length overall	Picture	Reference
2000	Tatoosh	92.42 m (303 ft)		
2006	Triple Seven	68 m (223 ft)		
2008	Siren	73.50 m (241 ft)		
2010	Jamaica Bay	59.85 m (196 ft)		
2010	Sycara V	68.15 m (224 ft)		
2011	Sapphire	73.50 m (241 ft)		
2012	Mogambo	73.51 m (241 ft)		
2012	Dytan	73.55 m (241 ft)		
2013	Odessa II	73.80 m (242 ft)		
2017	SY A	142.81 m (469 ft)		
2020	Artefact	80 m (262 ft)		
Under construction
Planned delivery	Name	Length overall	Notes	Reference
2023 (sea trials)	Miza	70 m (230 ft)		
2023	Project Black Shark	77.10 m (253 ft)		
