= MS Hamburg =

Cruise ship

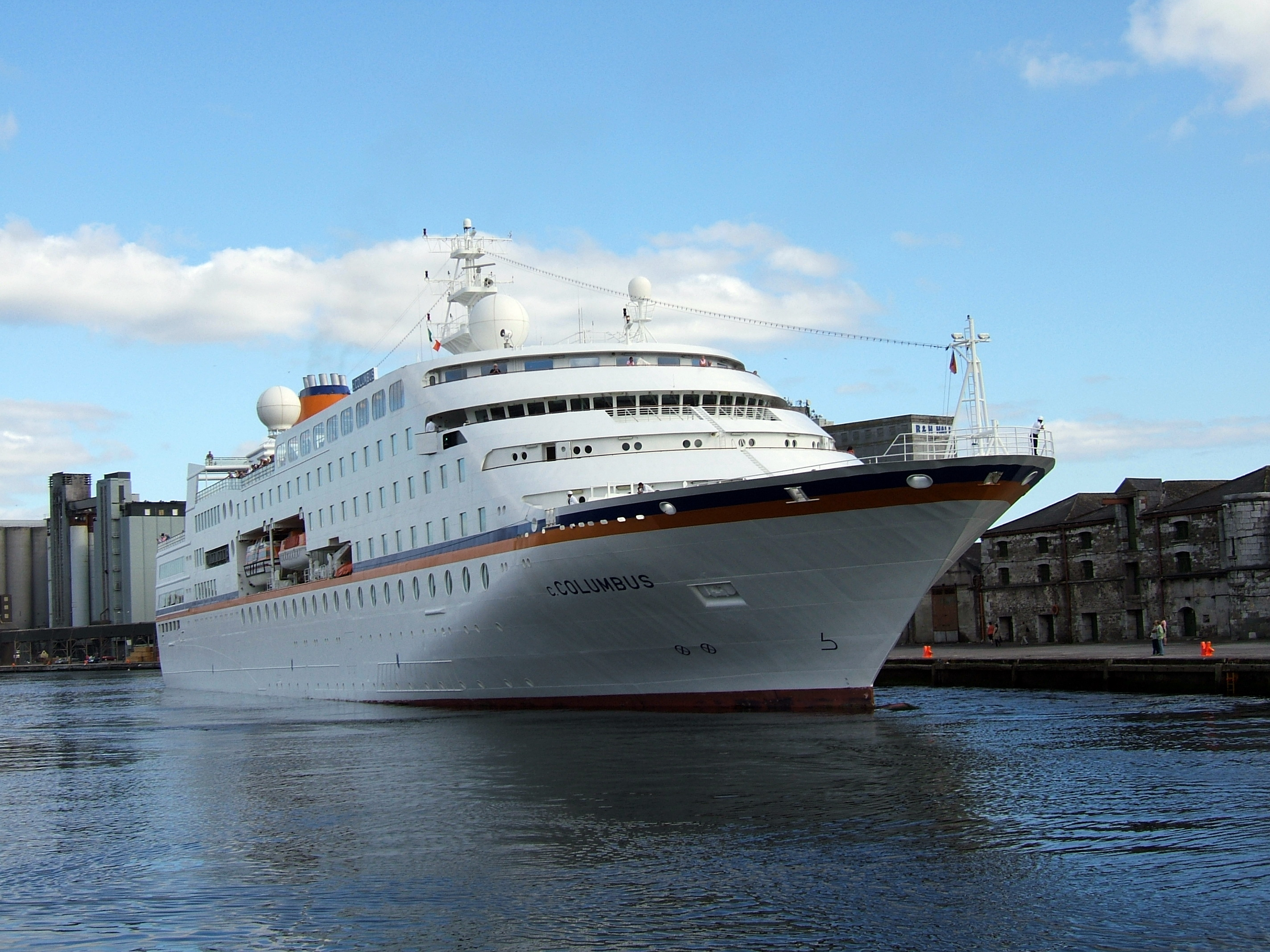
- C Columbus visiting Cork Harbour

History

Bahamas
- Name: 1997-2012: C. Columbus; 2012-present: Hamburg
- Owner: Conti Holding GmbH & Co KG, Munich
- Operator: 1997-2012: Hapag-Lloyd Cruises, Hamburg; 2012-present: Plantours & Partner GmbH, Bremen
- Port of registry: 1996 onwards: Nassau, Bahamas
- Ordered: 1993
- Builder: MTW Schiffswerft GmbH, Wismar, Germany
- Yard number: 451
- Laid down: 5 September 1995
- Launched: 30 October 1996
- Completed: 17 June 1997
- Maiden voyage: 29 June 1997
- In service: 1997–
- Identification: IMO number: 9138329; Call sign: C6OX6; MMSI number: 309908000
- Status: In service

General characteristics
- Type: Cruise ship
- Tonnage: 15,067 GT; 5,092 NT; 1,378 DWT
- Length: 144.13 m (472 ft 10 in)
- Beam: 21.50 m (70 ft 6 in)
- Draft: 5.15 m (16 ft 11 in)
- Depth: 13.25 m (43 ft 6 in)
- Decks: 6
- Ice class: GL E2
- Installed power: 4 × Wärtsilä 6L32 (4 × 2,640 kW)
- Propulsion: Two controllable pitch propellers
- Speed: 16 knots (30 km/h; 18 mph)
- Capacity: 420 passengers
- Crew: 170

MS Hamburg is a 15,000-ton, 420 passenger, luxury cruise ship owned by the Conti Group and is now operated by Plantours Kreuzfahrten. She was built in 1997, in Wismar, Germany. Her relative small size allows her to transit the Great Lakes in North America, where she cruised seasonally between 1997 and 2011 and again in 2022, as well as other cruises worldwide as travelling the Mediterranean for cultural cruises with Martin Randall Travel, the north Atlantic and at Asia. Her crew consists of 170 members, and her top speed is 16 knots. She was previously known as Columbus for Hapag-Lloyd, she was since replaced by Columbus 2.

She was designed for transit to the Great Lakes, and measures 472 ft 10 in (144.13 m) and was built by MTW Schiffswerft GmBH in Wismar, and has a capacity of 420 passengers. In 2024, a new livery and logo were announced. It underwent a extensive refit in 2020-2021, the refit included upgrades to cabins and public spaces maintaining its status as a small-sized cruise ship.

== Incidents ==
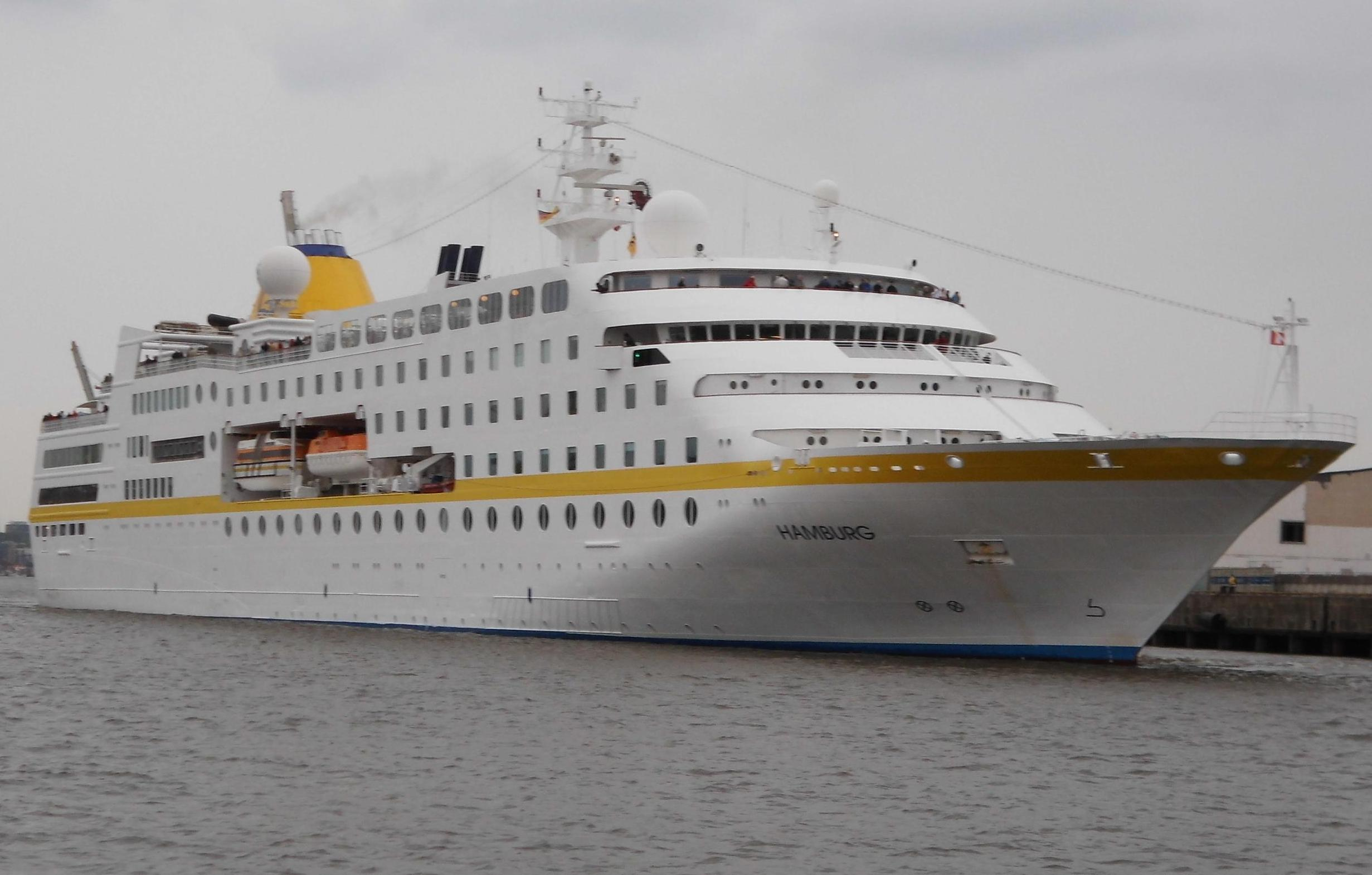
MS Hamburg in Plantours livery.

In April 2015, the vessel suffered damage due to an oil leak. The following trips were canceled in Tanger.

On 5 May 2015, a fishing net became tangled in the ship's propeller off the South East coast of England. The ship was diverted to Southampton to be inspected.

On 11 May 2015, the ship grounded on charted rocks near the New Rocks buoy in the Sound of Mull, Scotland. The official accident report states that Hamburg's bridge team failed to apply Bridge Team Management tools effectively.

The ship needed to be repaired at a shipyard in Belfast and at Bremerhaven and would be completed by 10 August 2015. To continue operations, Plantours chartered MS Deutschland.

On 26 November 2021, the MS Hamburg arrived in the Port of Buenos Aires coming from Cape Verde. The port was operating under a new, more restrictive, protocol for ships arriving from Africa, due to the emergence of the SARS-CoV-2 Omicron variant. However, according to Argentine newspaper Clarín, the Argentine authorities thought Cape Verde was in Asia and not in Africa, and let the ship enter the port without applying the correct protocol. According to the same report, the authorities took 12 hours to realize their mistake. The Argentine authorities, however, denied the mistake, stating that all the passengers in the ship were tested for Covid and that the results returned negative.

MS Hamburg at Isafjorour, Iceland in September 2026
