= Peter Deilmann Cruises =

Defunct German cruise company

Reederei Peter Deilmann GmbH
- Founded: 1968
- Founder: Peter Deilmann
- Defunct: 2015
- Successor: Callista Private Equity
- Headquarters: Neustadt in Holstein, Germany, Germany
- Services: Passenger transportation
- Parent: Aurelius AG
- Website: ex- http://www.deilmannkreuzfahrten.de This webpage is not available since middle of 2015.

Peter Deilmann Cruises (German: Peter Deilmann Reederei GmbH & Co. KG) was a German cruise company which offered river cruises throughout Europe and several ocean cruises. It was headquartered in Neustadt in Holstein, Germany.

== History ==
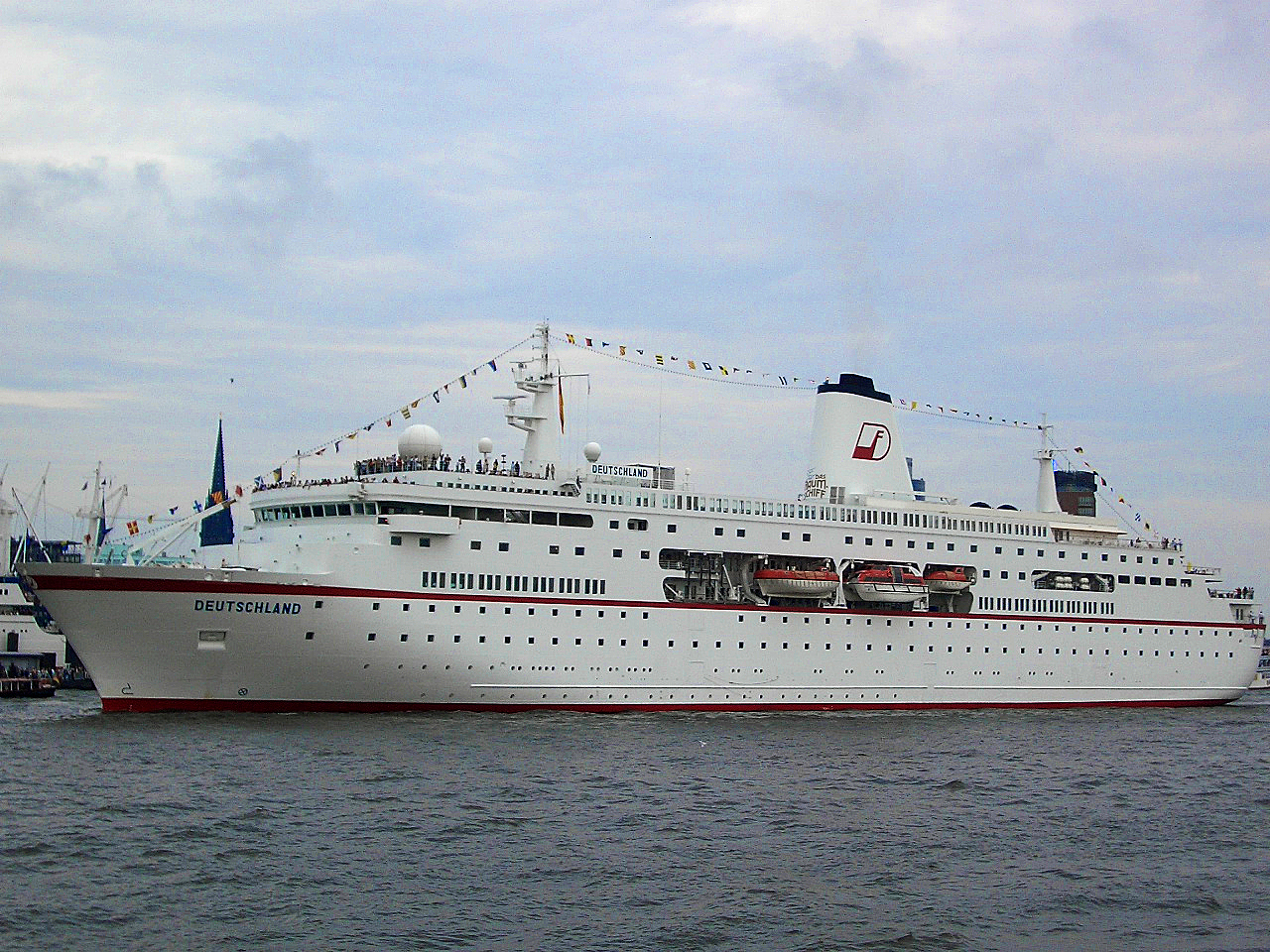
Deutschland in previous livery.

The founder Peter Deilmann began by chartering coasters in 1968. In 1973 he started his first passenger service between Neustadt (West Germany) and Ronne (Bornholm) using the small ferry Nordlicht. In 1976 and 1978 he acquired the elderly passenger ships Gripen and Frisia II (renamed Nordshau and Nordpaloma) to start a ferry service between Neustadt and Rodby. Also in 1976, Deilmann acquired the Norwegian Rost (renamed Nordbrise) and started a pioneer service between West and East Germany. Nordbrise was later used for his first cruise venture in Greenland.

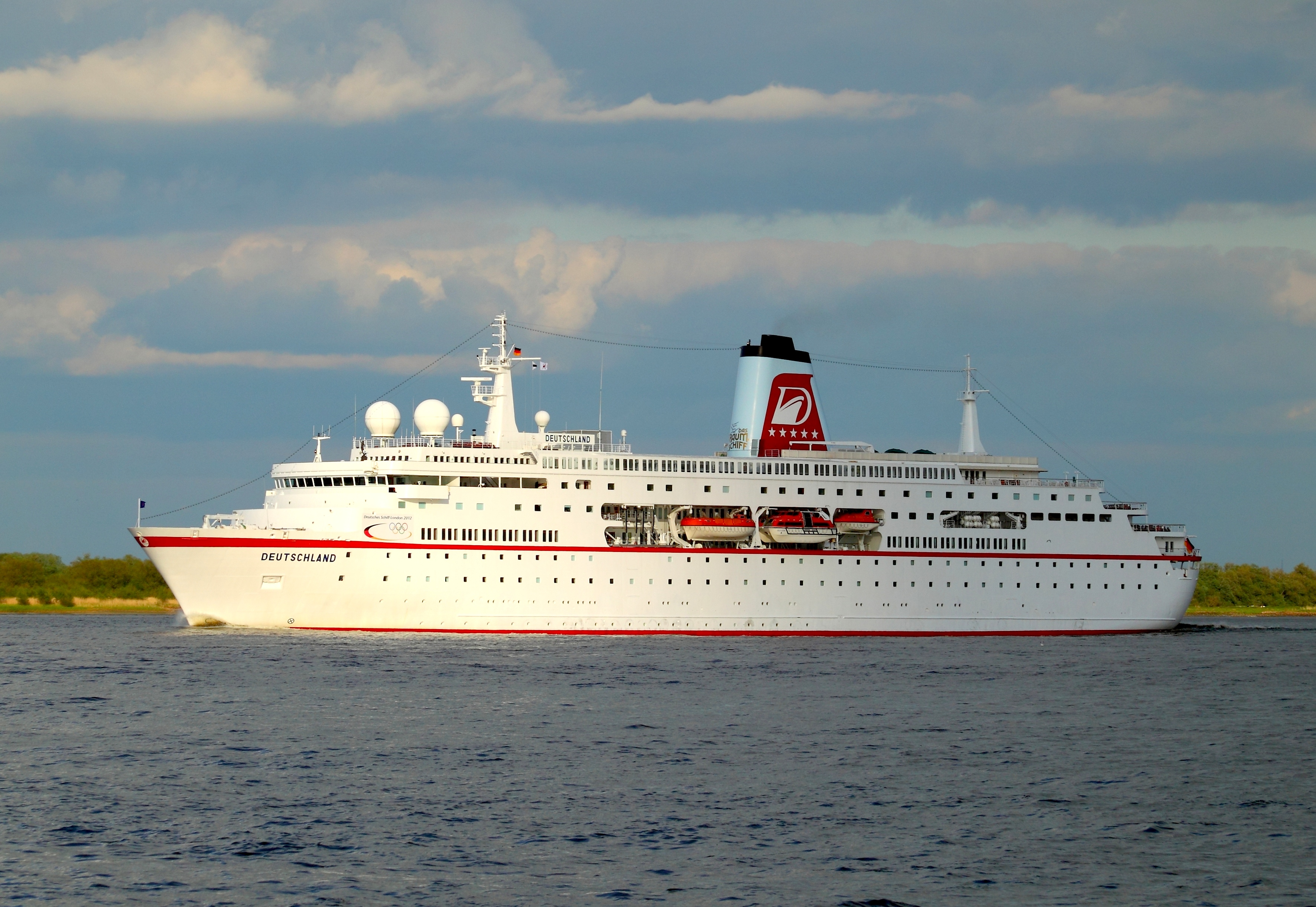
Deutschland in current livery.

In 1979, Deilmann ordered his first new cruise ship, the Berlin. She was owned by a consortium of German investors, and Deilmann only had a minority share. Whilst awaiting delivery, he also bought the Regina Maris, which was sold to Kuwait in 1982 for conversion into a large private yacht. Berlin was chartered for far-eastern service as the Princess Mahsuri between 1982 and 1985. The Deilmann charter of Berlin ended in 2004.

In 1983, Deilmann acquired their first river cruise vessel, the Donauprinzessin. In 1994 the first sailing cruise ship, the Lili Marleen was acquired. The impressive Deutschland was delivered in 1998.

== Insolvency ==
Following the insolvency of Peter Deilmann Reederei GmbH & Co. KG in 2009, with up to ten ocean and river cruise ships last, which had a turnover of around 50 million euros and around 50,000 passengers transported, was after the reestablishment of Reederei Peter Deilmann GmbH from 1 January 2010, the shipping company activity resumed. In October 2010, the new shipping company acquired a majority stake of the German industrial holding AURELIUS AG, which sold its stake to a minority share in early 2013 to the Callista Private Equity.

On January 20, 2015, the insolvency administrator had canceled all scheduled tours of Germany. The last and unique ship MS Deutschland was sold in May 2015 to the Las Vegas United States Investor Donald Hoffman of Absolute Nevada LLC, who chartered the ship previously to Plantours for 4 cruises and since September 2015 to Semester at Sea. It followed a non more existent Administrative domain in Internet.

The company has been closed by the courts, a court appointed a lawyer, who had been settling the outstanding accounts with the money received from the sale of the last ship, about one third (US$21 million) of about 60 million loan, the holders lost, once all matters have been settled and approved by the court – which can take many months – all activities were to close down, due bankruptcy and all remained costs to be paid.

== Fleet ==
=== Former Ocean, Sea, and Coastal Cruises ===
- 1980-2004 > MV Berlin
- 1998-2015 > MS Deutschland. (Last and unique ship of company in 2015)
- 1994-2004 > MSV Lili Marleen (The unique Sailing Vessel the company had)
- 1976-1984 > MV Nordbrise
- 1973-1985 > MV Nordlicht
- 1978-1985 > MV Nordpaloma
- 1976-1984 > MV Nordschau
- 1974-1977 > MV Nordwelle
- 1980-1983 > MV Regina Maris

=== Former River Cruise ===
Due to the weak economy, Peter Deilmann shut down their River Cruise Division in 2010. The vessels of the former fleet were:

- 2001-2009 > MV Casanova
- 1999-2009 > MV Cézanne
- 1983-2006 > MV Donauprinzessin (renamed to MV Rossini)
- 1994-2009 > MV Dresden (renamed to MV River Allegro)
- 2002-2009 > MV Frederic Chopin
- 2004-2009 > MV Heidelberg
- 2000-2009 > MV Katharina von Bora
- 1998-2008 > MV Königstein
- 1993-2009 > MV Mozart (renamed to MV Dertour Mozart)
- 1992-2008 > MV Princesse De Provence
- 1991-2008 > MV Prinzessin von Preussen (renamed to MV Prinzessin Katharina)

Around 2000 the cruise line made about $100 million United States dollars per year. In 2009 in the United Kingdom Peter Deilmann Cruises joined the Truly Independent Professional Travel Organisation (TIPTO) marketing consortium, becoming its 16th member.

=== Accident ===
The company chartered the ill-fated Air France Flight 4590, the Concorde flight from Charles de Gaulle International Airport near Paris, France, to John F. Kennedy International Airport in New York City, New York, United States (operated by Air France) which crashed on 25 July 2000 at Gonesse, France, killing all one hundred passengers and nine crew on board the flight, and four people on the ground. The flight was chartered by Peter Deilmann Cruises and nearly all passengers were on their way to board the MS Deutschland cruise ship in New York City for a 16-day cruise to Manta, Ecuador.
