= MS Bleichen =

Museum ship in the port of Hamburg, Germany

Coordinates: 53.52937°N 9.998661°E

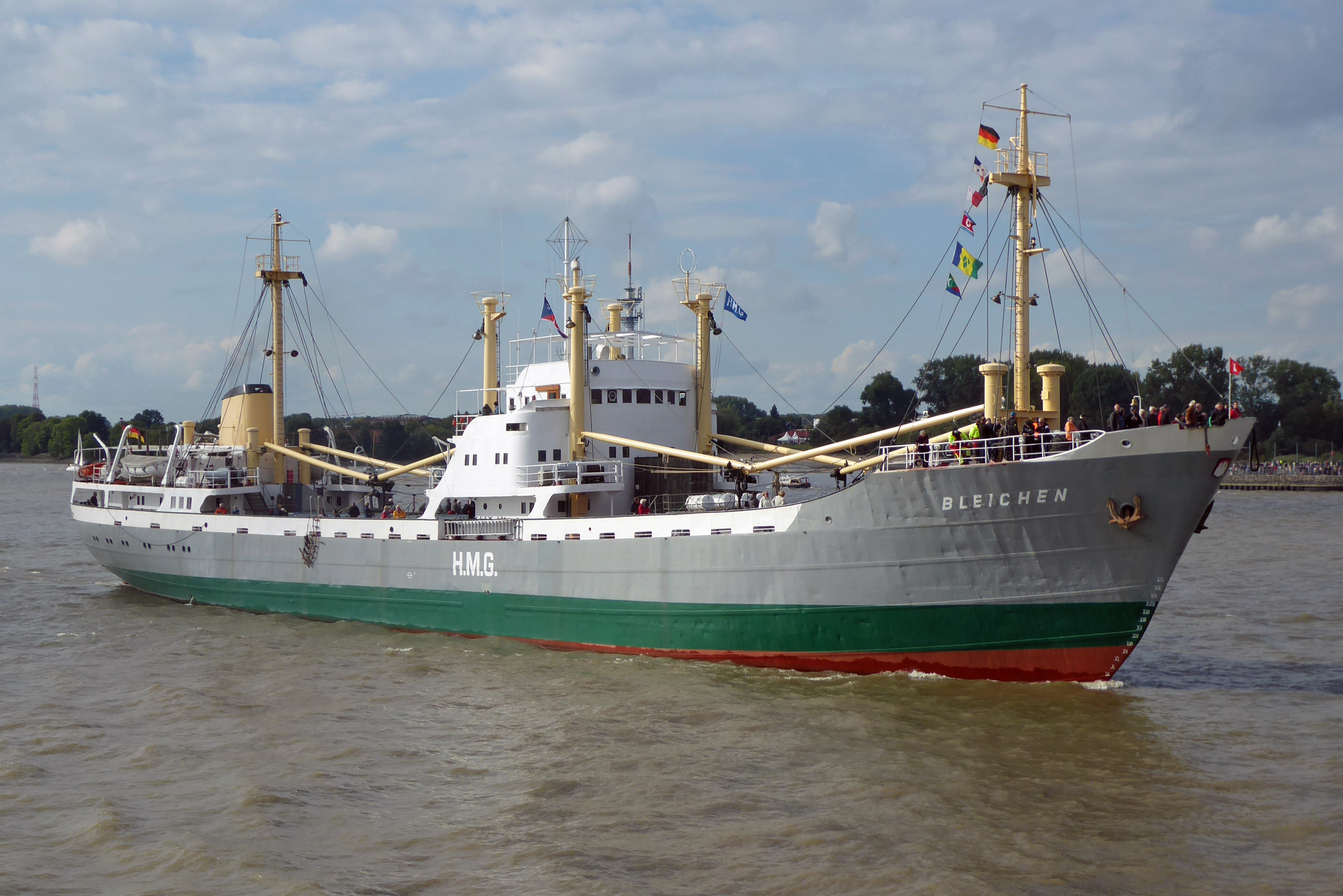
- MS Bleichen

History
- Name: Bleichen (1958-1970); Canale Grande (1970–1979); Arcipel (1979–1994); Old Lady (1994–2007); Bleichen (2007-)
- Namesake: Bleichen; Canale Grande; Arcipel
- Owner: H. M. Gehrckens (1958-1970); Hamburg Maritime Foundation (2007-)
- Port of registry: Germany (1958-1970); Italy (1970-1979); Turkey (1979-2007); Germany (2007-)
- Builder: Nobiskrug Shipyard
- Launched: 26 June 1958
- Commissioned: 28 August 1958
- Home port: Hamburg
- Identification: IMO number: 5046281; MMSI number: 211711370; Callsign: DDXU2; Pennant number: 607
- Fate: Museum ship in Hamburg

General characteristics
- Type: Cargo ship
- Displacement: 2,129 t (2,095 long tons)
- Length: 93.30 m (306.1 ft)
- Beam: 12.30 m (40.4 ft)
- Height: 7.20 m (23.6 ft)
- Draft: 4.69 m (15.4 ft)
- Installed power: 1,800 hp (1,342 kW)
- Propulsion: 1 × Klöckner-Humboldt-Deutz diesel engine; 1 × shaft
- Speed: 12 knots (22 km/h; 14 mph)
- Capacity: 2,200 t (2,165 long tons)
- Complement: 24 crew

MS Bleichen is a museum ship in the port of Hamburg, which has its berth in the Hansa port on Bremer Kai in front of Shed 50. The ship, built in 1958, is a breakbulk cargo carrier of its time and is located in front of the listed general cargo storage shed used by the port museum.

== Design ==
The Bleichen has midships and stern superstructures, a deck design that went out of fashion as early as the 1950s, but guaranteed a high level of comfort in the center bridge, as it was less affected by engine vibrations and noise. Despite its age, the ship is largely unchanged and in good condition. The ship's diesel engine from Klöckner-Humboldt-Deutz has remained unchanged, as have the steering gear, the lifeboats and the propeller. According to information provided by former crew members, the interior is also in its original condition.

The Bleichen was therefore built with a high ice class in order to be able to navigate the Baltic Sea all year round.

== Construction and career ==
The ship was built at the Nobiskrug Shipyard in Rendsburg for the Hamburg shipping company H. M. Gehrckens (HMG) and put into service under the name of Bleichen on 28 August 1958. Like its sister ship Borgesch, the freighter was named after an old Hamburg street. The Bleichen was a typical general cargo ship, as it was in use before the advent of container ships. The Gehrckens shipping company used their ships in the Scandinavian trade.

The ship transported paper from Finland to Germany until 1970. In 1970 it was given the name Canale Grande by the new Italian owner. The Canale Grande was bought by a Turkish shipowner in 1979 and renamed Arcipel. The ship was used from 1994 to December 2006 under the name Old Lady for transporting bulk cargo in the Black Sea.

Due to the construction as a three-island ship and the complex operation, the operation of the ship was no longer profitable. The Bleichen had relatively small hatches and tween decks, making loading and unloading inefficient by today's standards. With a crew of 22 men, it took three days to load 2,000 tons of scrap. The ship was to be decommissioned and scrapped.

The Hamburg Maritime Foundation, which was looking for a general cargo ship for its museum at the Shed 50, the last remaining Hamburg quay shed from the time of the German Empire, became aware of the ship in 2006 and decided to buy it. The purchase price of 450,000 euros was raised through donations. After a stay in the shipyard in Turkey, it was transferred to Hamburg in January 2007, where it arrived on January 30, 2007.

On 27 April 2007, the Old Lady was christened back to her first name, Bleichen. Since then it has sailed again under the German flag with its home port of Hamburg. On February 6, 2007, a works association "Friends of the General Cargo Freighter MS Bleichen" was founded for restoration and operation. The restoration is to be carried out by volunteers and by the "Youth in Work" project. The restoration time was estimated at around three years, but took longer. Deficiencies were found in the midships superstructure and the main engine, which will take longer than expected to be rectified.

On 24 October 2017, the Bleichen was successfully tested and accepted on the Elbe. Guest trips have been offered again since 2018.
