= Hamburg Maritime Foundation =

German maritime foundation

- Stiftung Hamburg Maritim
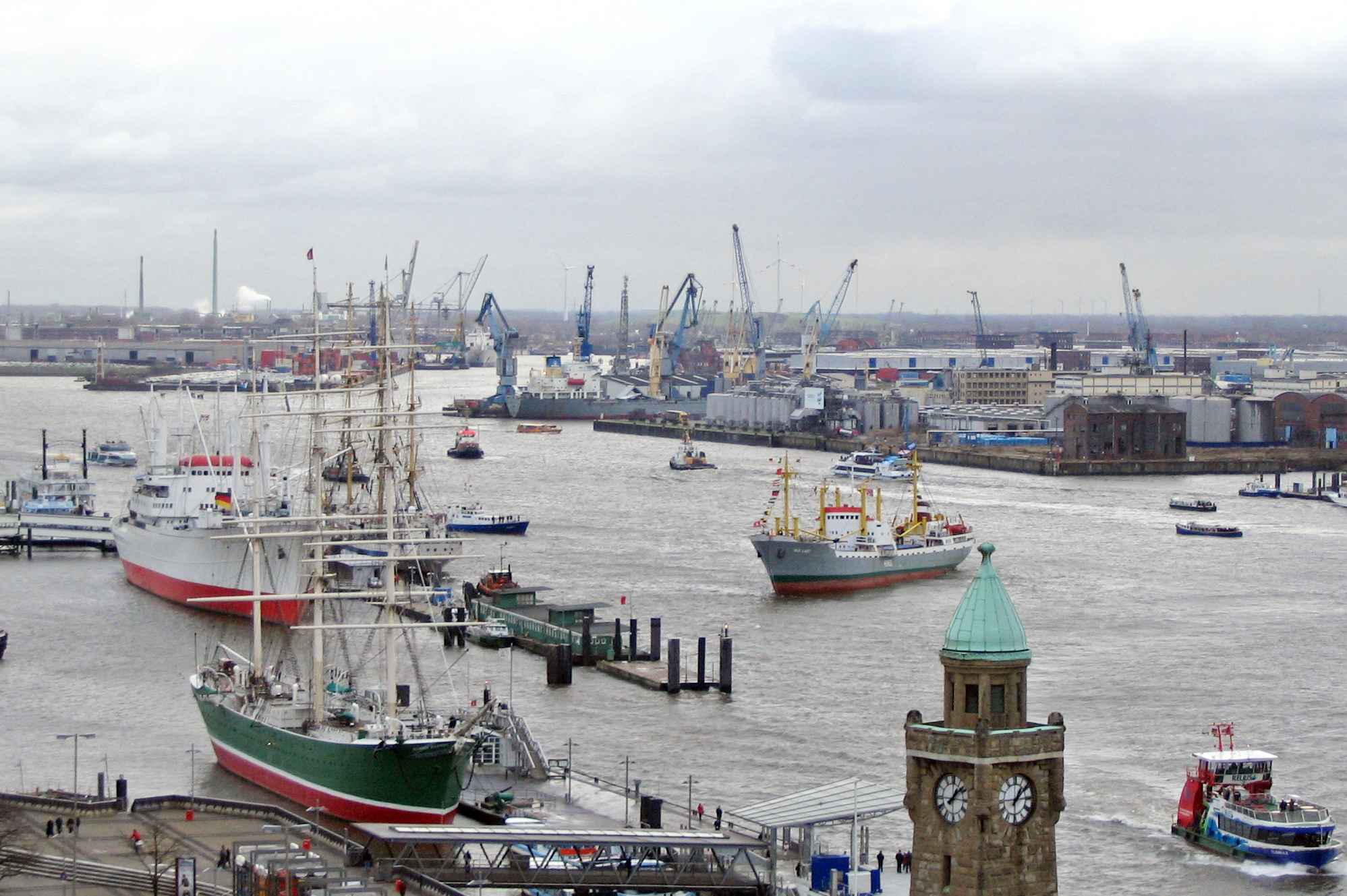
- Established: 2001
- Location: Hamburg, Germany
- Coordinates: 53°31′49″N 9°59′44″E
- Type: Maritime museum
- Collections: Museum ships Historic sites
- Website: Stiftung Hamburg Maritim

The Hamburg Maritim Foundation (Stiftung Hamburg Maritim) is a legally responsible foundation based in Hamburg, Germany and was founded in 2001.

== Overview ==
The Hamburg Maritime Foundation has set itself the task of preserving evidence of the maritime history of the Free and Hanseatic City of Hamburg and the Hamburg metropolitan region. It preserves and restores traditional ships, port railways and port facilities, their equipment and facilities as well as structural facilities that represent the history of the Port of Hamburg and shipping. The aim is not only to conserve the objects, but to operate them in a functional manner and make them accessible to the general public.

It was founded by the Hamburgische Landesbank on the initiative of the Hamburg Chamber of Commerce. The Commerz-Collegium zu Altona was one of the first sponsors. The work is continuously supported by the Freundeskreis Maritimes Erbe Hamburg e. V.

The Foundation is managed by a four-member Board of Directors. A board of trustees consisting of twelve people controls the executive board and makes fundamental decisions. The Advisory Board includes a representative from each works association and the harbourmaster, as well as a representative from the Hamburg Port Authority. Since 2015, a "steering group" has been active as a permanent representative of the advisory board. Its members represent the advisory board in operational business.

== Task ==
The foundation is active in the fields of restoration, preservation and operation. The restoration of historical objects requires a high degree of professional competence and care. To this end, the foundation works with shipyards and specialized companies, but also with training and funding institutions.

For many, the ships and the port itself are part of their history. In the associations that operate the ships and facilities, this personal bond leads to a large voluntary commitment to the preservation of maritime heritage. Under the umbrella of the foundation, around 1,700 volunteers are involved in the maintenance and operation of the traditional ships and port railways as well as port facilities. Thanks to the volunteers, who work in independent associations, the ships and a railcar of the port railway can also be experienced by everyone on public trips.

== Exhibits ==
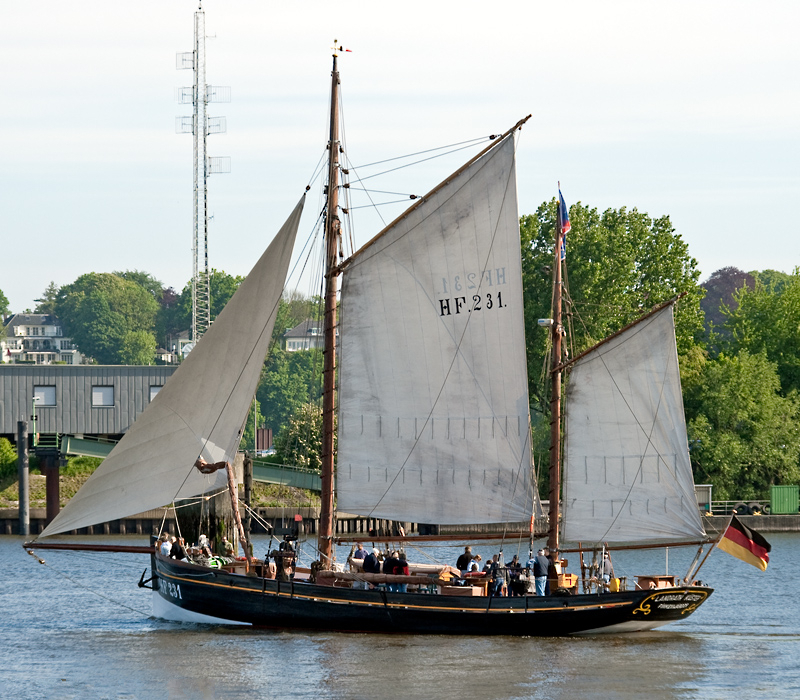
Deep-sea cutter Landrath Küster

=== Museum ships ===
Sailing cargo ship Undine and steel barque Peking are still undergoing restoration.

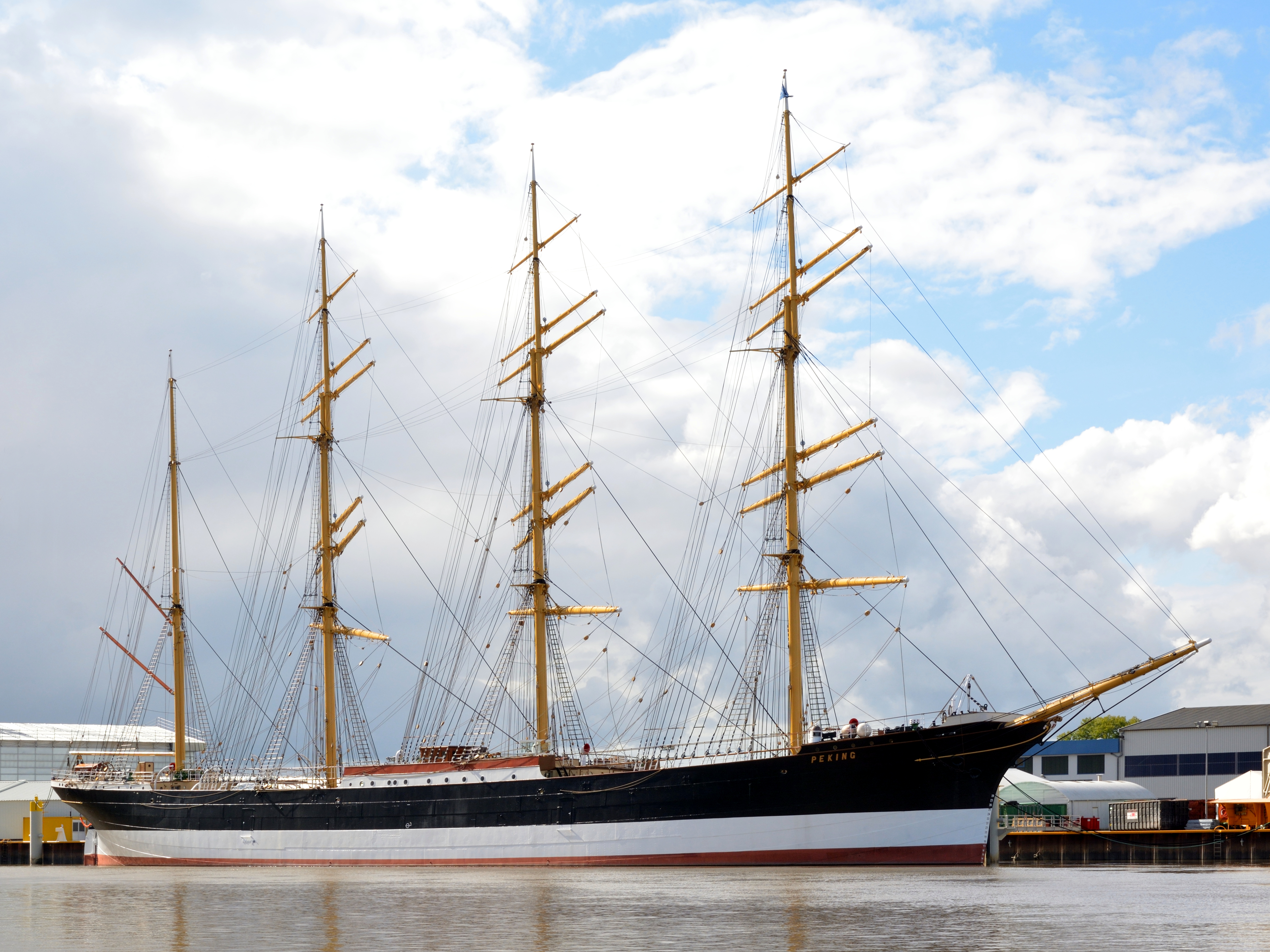
Steel barque Peking

==== Sea worthy ships ====
- Sailing ship Catarina
- Sailing ship Johanna
- Schooner No.5 Elbe
- Tugboat Fairplay VIII
- Racing yacht Heti
- Deep-sea cutter Landrath Küster
- Steamship Schaarhorn
- Inspection boat Süderelbe
- Fishing cutter Greta
- Cargo ship Bleheim

==== Stationary ships ====
- Freighter Hermann
- Bucket chain excavator Alster
- Port barge Porto Alegre
- Salvage steamer Flint III

=== Historic sites ===
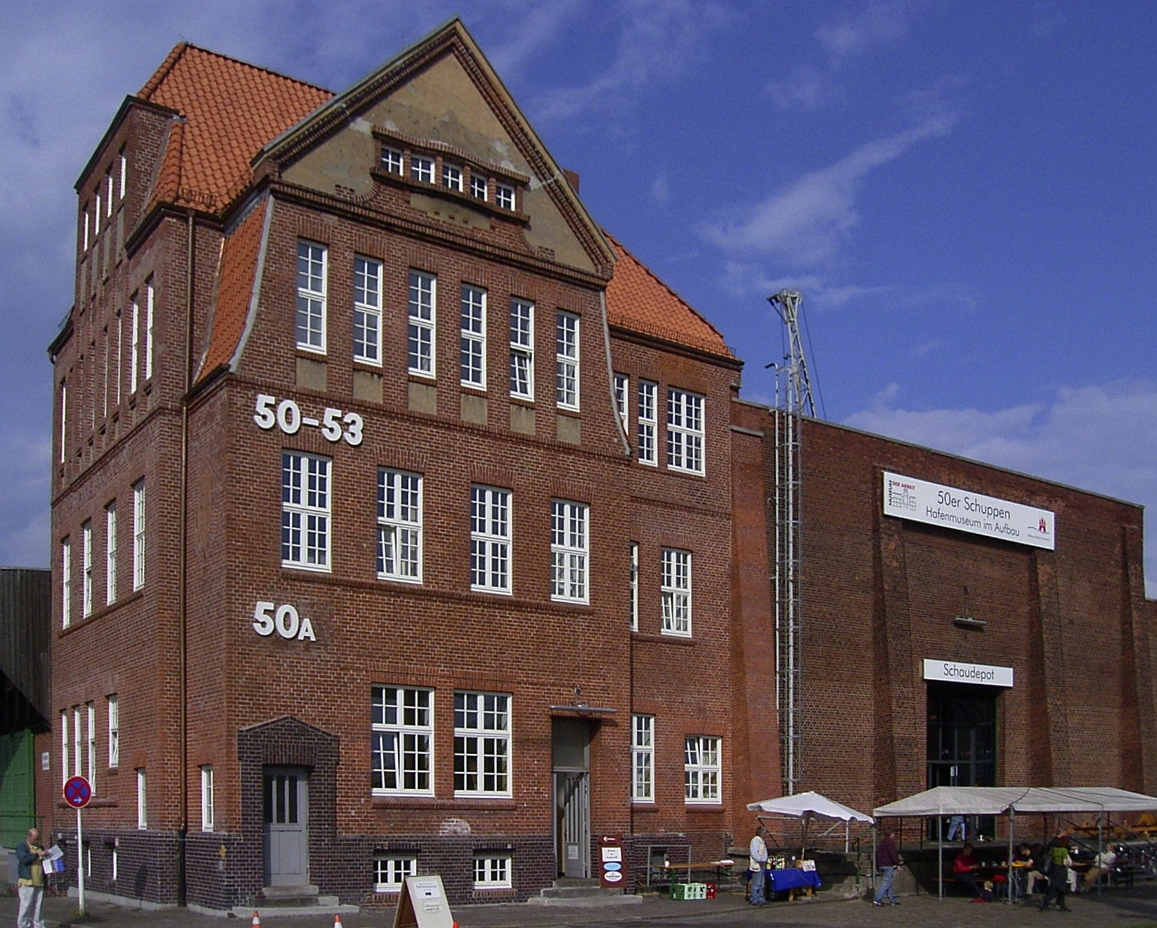
Shed 50

==== Port facilities and quay sheds ====
The Shed 50 on Australiastraße are among Hamburg's oldest surviving port facilities and are the last surviving quay sheds from the Imperial Germany era. When the building complex was completed in 1910, it was a figurehead for Hamburg's port industry and was considered the most modern port facility of the time. The construction of the storage shed was groundbreaking for the economic handling of goods, while aspects of social reform were taken into account for the first time with the associated company buildings.

In 2002, the foundation took over the Shed 50 from HHLA Hamburger Hafen und Lagerhaus (today: Logistik) AG and from the Free and Hanseatic City of Hamburg, with the condition that it be restored entirely from its own funds. This saved the historic buildings from demolition. The Shed 50 is now a listed building.

Even today, the Shed 50 is managed by commercially active storekeepers who store goods and spices there. The Hamburg Harbor Museum is located in Shed 50A.

==== Port railways ====
The foundation also includes track systems and track vehicles, which are managed by the “Verein der Historische Hafenbahn e. V.” are operated. The port railway has been the most important connection between the port and the hinterland since the second half of the 19th century and is therefore still an indispensable part of the ensemble of monuments. Historical goods handling is carried out on the tracks at various events, for example between historical trucks, the port railway and the cargo ship Bleichen.

The stock of the historic port railway comprises a total of 29 vehicles, including two steam storage locomotives, workshop wagons, various freight wagons, a transport wagon with a hand crane from 1869, a trolley and the VT 4.42 railbus. Every second Saturday of the month, the rail bus can be used to travel along the 300 kilometers of HPA tracks.

==== Emigrant town on the Veddel ====
From 1900, Albert Ballin had the Ballinstadt named after him built on the Veddel in Hamburg. Sleeping and living pavilions, dining halls, baths, churches, synagogues and rooms for medical examinations were built for the emigrants who were transported on the ships of the then HAPAG. The foundation developed the overall concept for the emigration museum.
