= Tatoosh (yacht) =

2001 superyacht

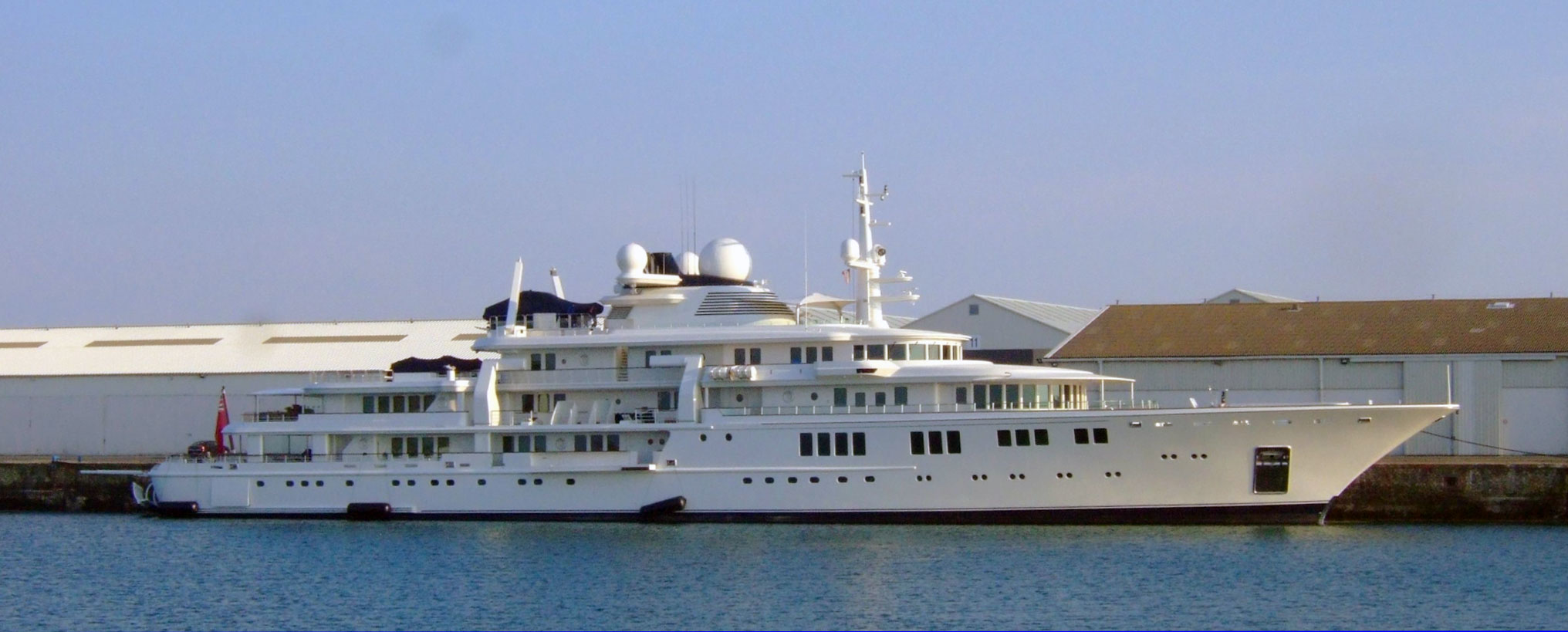
- In the harbour of La Rochelle

History
- Name: Tatoosh
- Port of registry: Cayman Islands
- Builder: Nobiskrug
- Completed: June 2000
- Identification: IMO number: 1006336; MMSI number: 319801000; Callsign: ZCIF8

General characteristics
- Tonnage: 3,229 GT
- Displacement: 2,300 t (2,300 long tons)
- Length: 92.40 m (303 ft 2 in)
- Beam: 14.90 m (48 ft 11 in)
- Draft: 4.30 m (14 ft 1 in)
- Decks: 5
- Installed power: 2 × 4,400 hp (3,300 kW)
- Speed: 19 knots (35 km/h; 22 mph)
- Range: 5,000 nmi (9,300 km; 5,800 mi)
- Crew: 35

Tatoosh is a 303-foot (92 m) superyacht that was owned by Paul Allen, the co-founder of Microsoft, who also owned Octopus. After Allen's death in 2018, the yacht became the property of the President of the United Arab Emirates, Mohamed bin Zayed Al Nahyan. Tatoosh is the world's 60th largest superyacht.

== History ==
Originally built for mobile phone magnate Craig McCaw, Tatoosh was built at Rendsburg in Germany by Nobiskrug and completed in June 2000. Design and Construction by Kusch Yachts. She was purchased by Paul Allen in 2001 at a reported cost of $100 million.

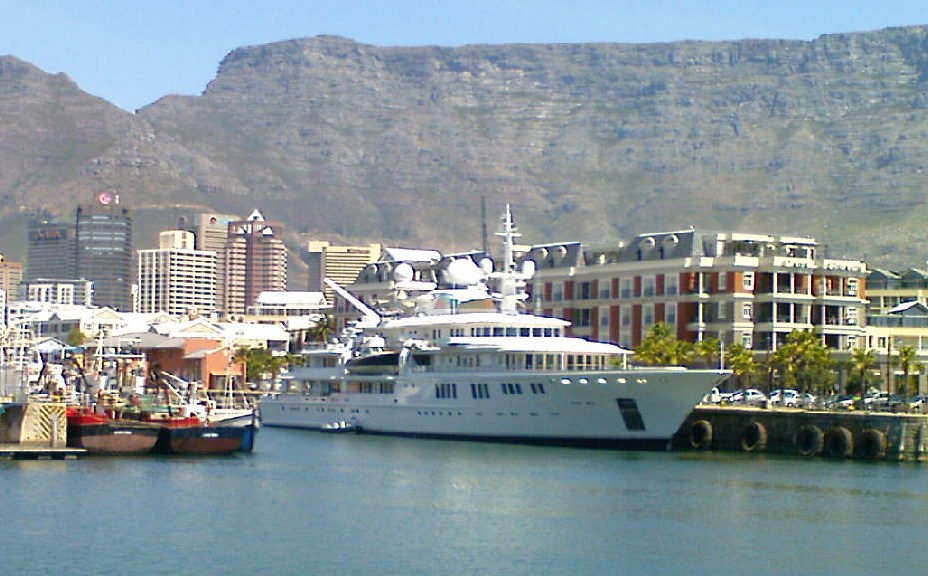
Docked at the V&A Waterfront in Cape Town

Tatoosh was hired for £400,000 by Teodorín Nguema Obiang, the son of Equatorial Guinean president Teodoro Obiang Nguema Mbasogo, for a Christmas cruise when he entertained rap singer Eve.

In May 2010, Tatoosh was listed for sale with Fraser Yachts, listed at €125 million. The listing was withdrawn in 2014 after failing to attract a buyer. In June 2021, she was again on the market, this time listed at €90 million.

In January 2016, Tatoosh destroyed 14,000 square feet (1,300 m^{2}) of coral reef in the West Bay replenishment zone in the Cayman Islands according to officials. The owners of Tatoosh released a statement that the mooring location was explicitly directed by the local port authority.

== Features ==
Tatoosh can accommodate up to 20 guests and 35 crew members. Its features include:

- Five decks
- a master suite, a saloon and other rooms on the top deck
- a saloon with a French limestone fireplace, a dining area, staterooms and a ladies' powder room on the main deck
- a shaded 6 feet (1.8 m) deep swimming pool with adjustable floor in depth, located aft on the main deck beneath a full overhang
- a movie theatre
- facilities to transport two helicopters on the top two decks
- custom 46 feet (14 m) power and sailboats
- beach club with dive center

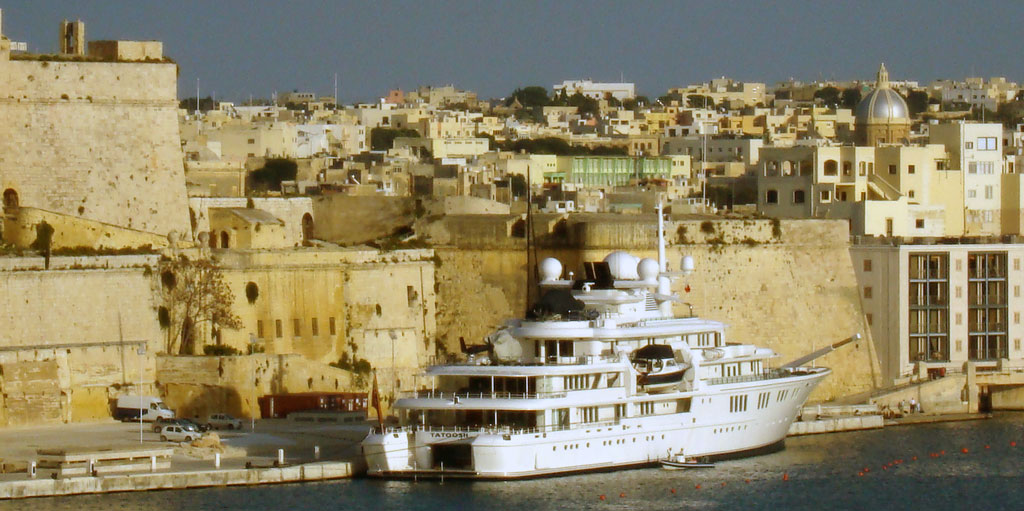
In the harbour of Valletta, Malta
