= MS Deutschland =

Cruise ship launched in 1998

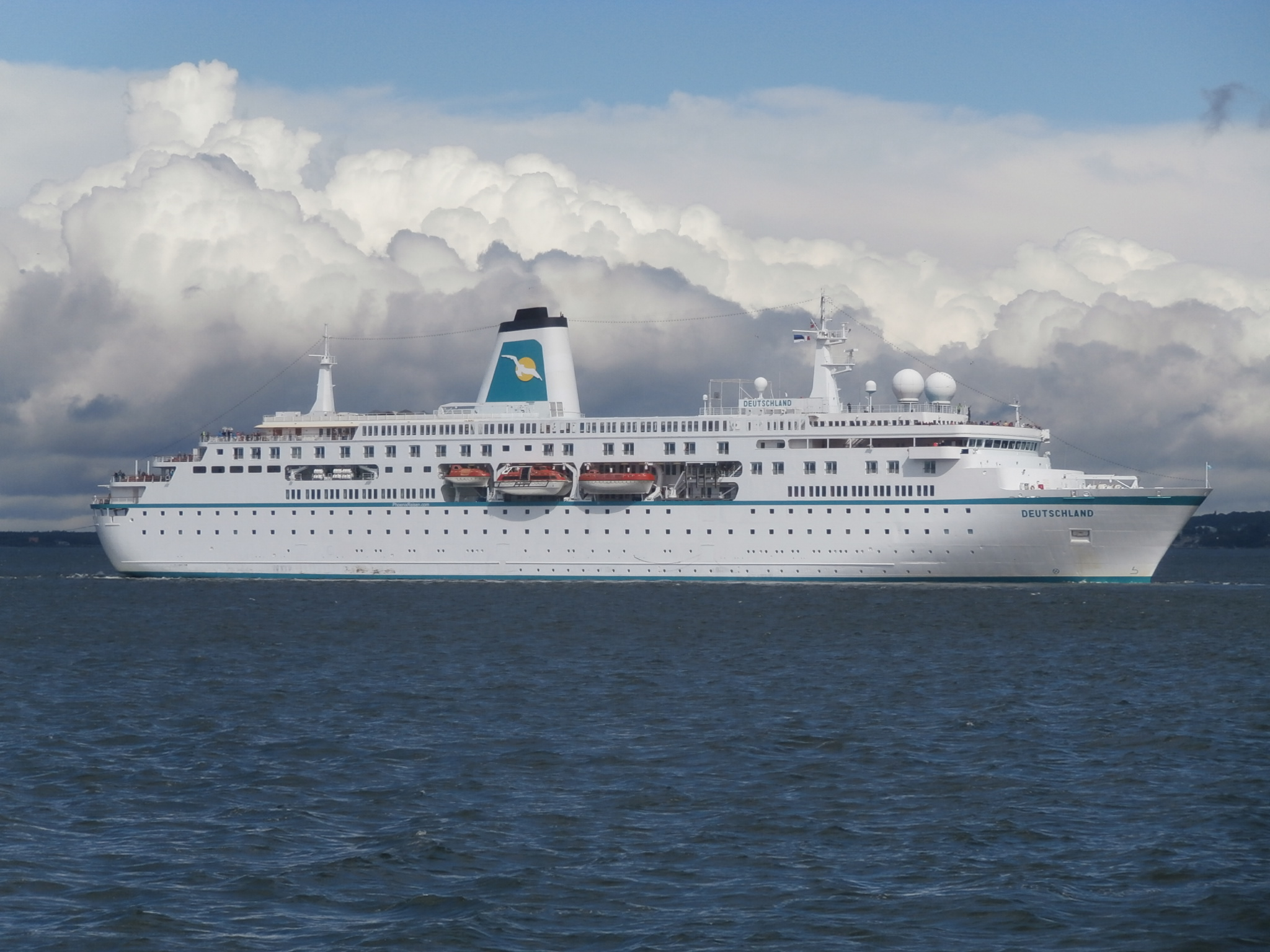
- MS Deutschland in Tallinn, Estonia August 4, 2017

History
- Name: 1998–2015: Deutschland; 2015–2026: World Odyssey / Deutschland (alternating); from 2026: only as World Odyssey
- Owner: Previously Peter Deilmann Reederei → ms 'Deutschland' Beteiligungsgesellschaft mbH; Absolute Nevada LLC., Las Vegas, Mr. Donald Hoffman (since 05.2015)
- Operator: Previously Peter Deilmann Reederei; Semester at Sea (since 19.05.2015)
- Port of registry: 1998–2015: Neustadt in Holstein, Germany; 2015–2028: Nassau, Bahamas
- Builder: Howaldtswerke-Deutsche Werft, Kiel, Germany
- Yard number: 328
- Launched: 16 January 1998
- Christened: 11 May 1998
- Acquired: 11 May 1998
- Maiden voyage: 11 May 1998
- In service: 16 May 1998
- Identification: Call sign: C6BZ6; IMO number: 9141807; MMSI number: 311000410; DNV ID: G93135
- Status: In service

General characteristics
- Type: Cruise ship
- Tonnage: 22,496 GT; 3,460 DWT
- Length: 175.30 m (575 ft 2 in)
- Beam: 23 m (75 ft 6 in)
- Draught: 5.79 m (19 ft 0 in)
- Decks: 10 (7 passenger accessible)
- Installed power: 2 × MaK-Dieselmotorenwerk Rostock DMR 8M32; 2 × MaK-DMR 6M32; 12,320 kW (combined)
- Propulsion: Twin propeller
- Speed: 20 knots (37 km/h; 23 mph)
- Capacity: 650 passengers (maximum capacity)

MS Deutschland (starting in 2015 also sailing as World Odyssey from September until April each year) is a cruise ship launched in 1998 and owned and operated by Peter Deilmann Cruises until 2015. She is decorated in the 1920s style as it could be seen in SS Columbus of Norddeutscher Lloyd. The ship can carry up to 650 passengers and 260 crew members. She has a gross tonnage of 22,496 and has seven passenger accessible decks.

== History ==
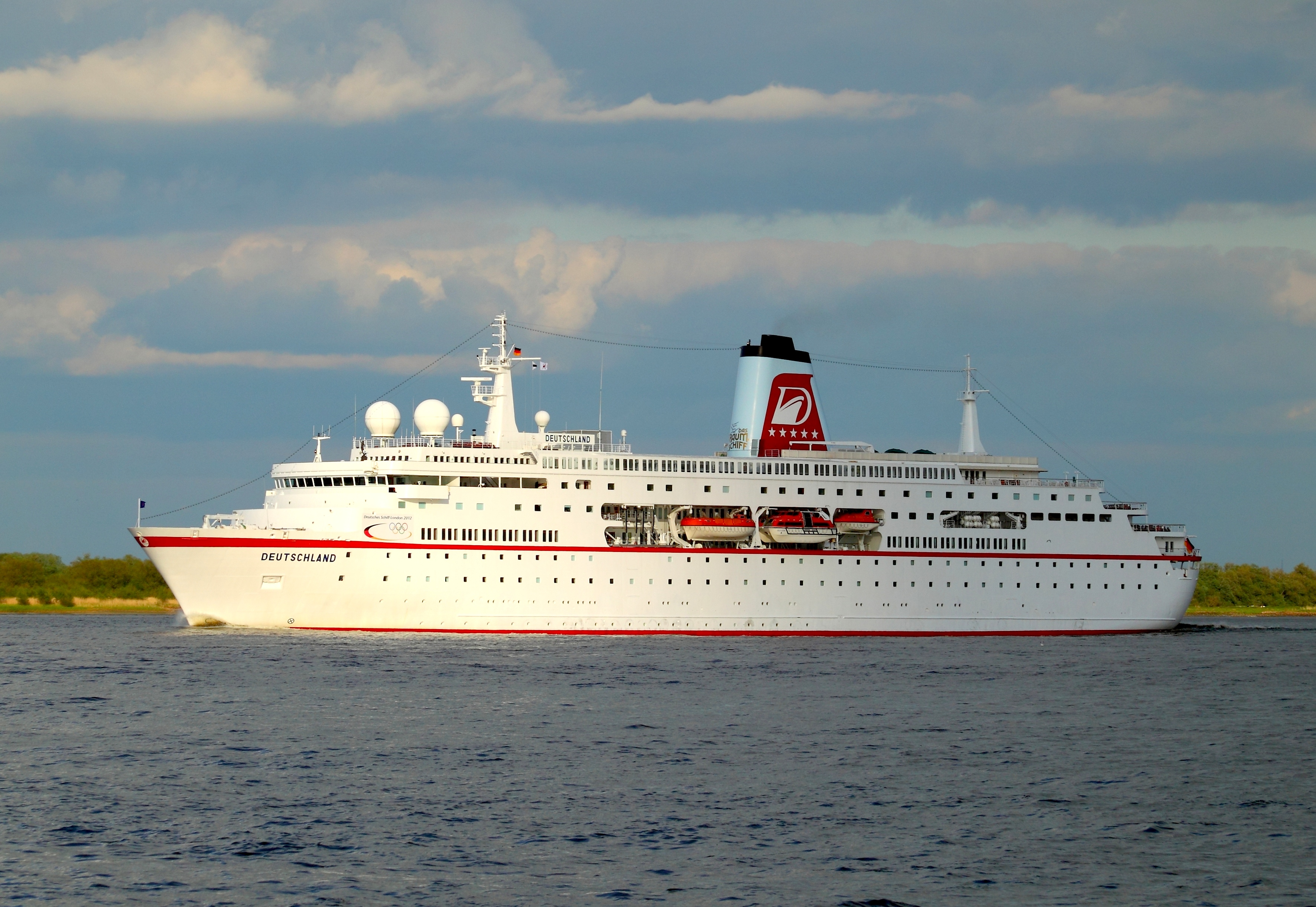
Deutschland on Elbe river in 2012 with Summer Olympics signage

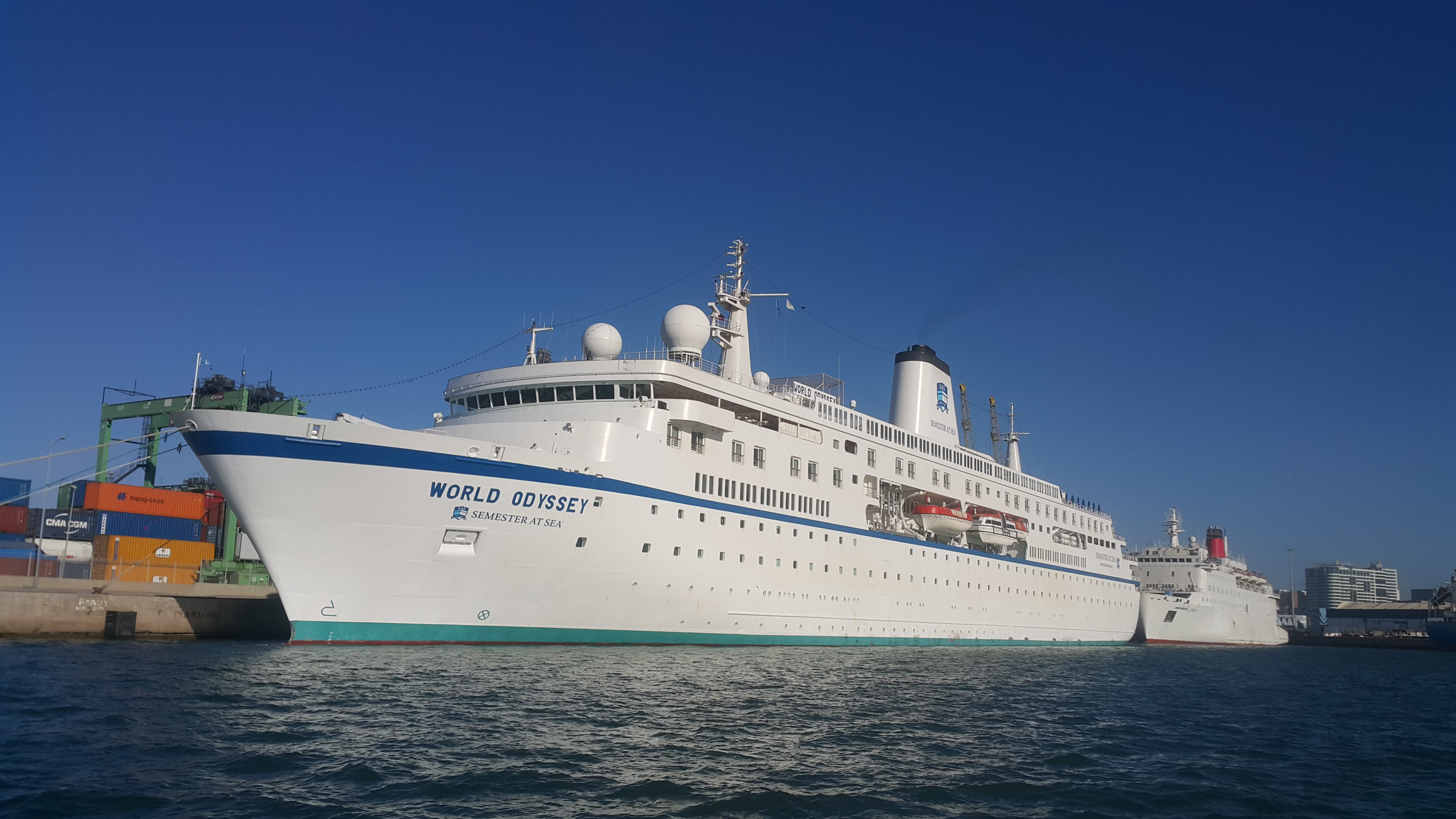
World Odyssey

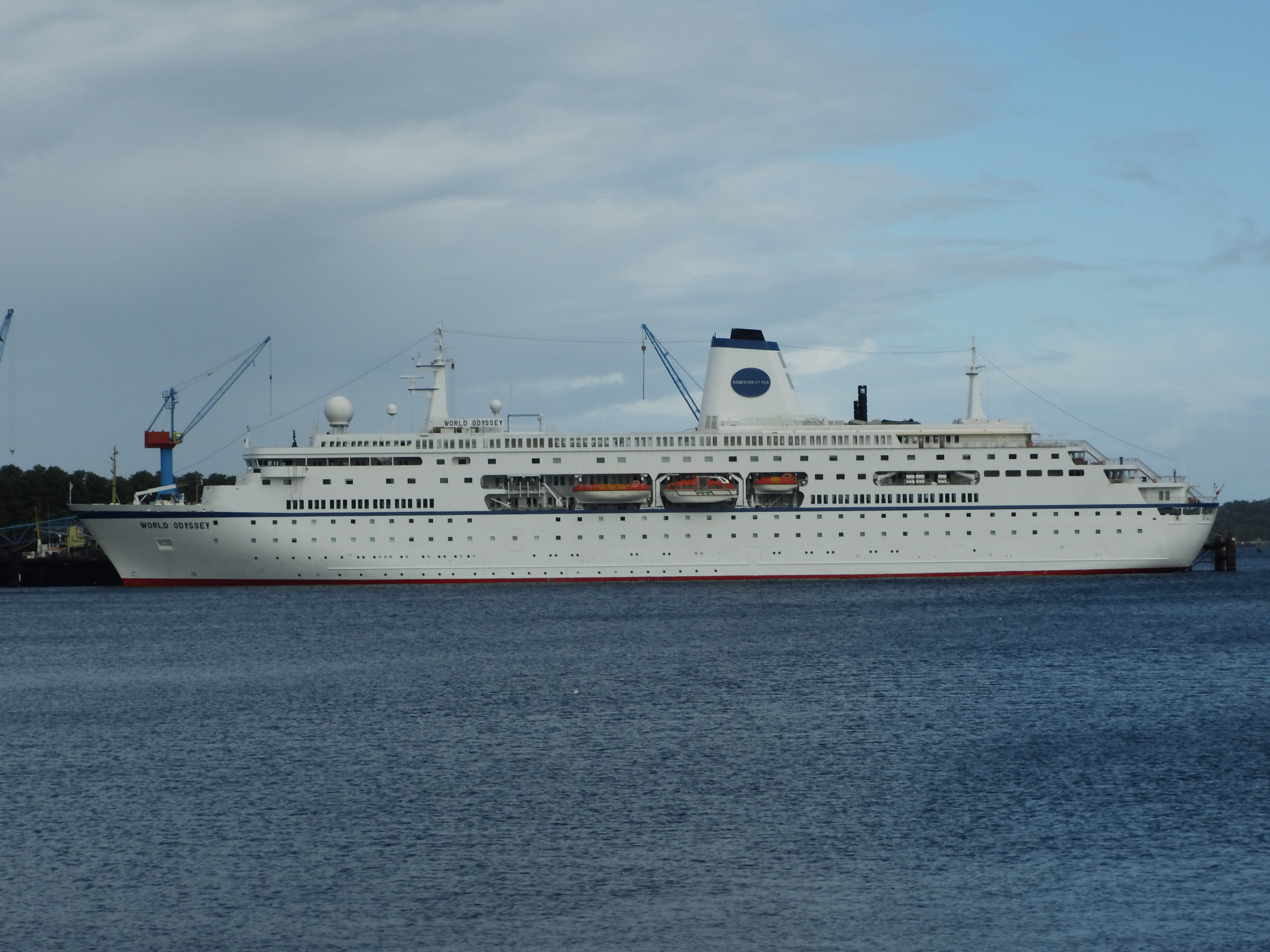
World Odyssey

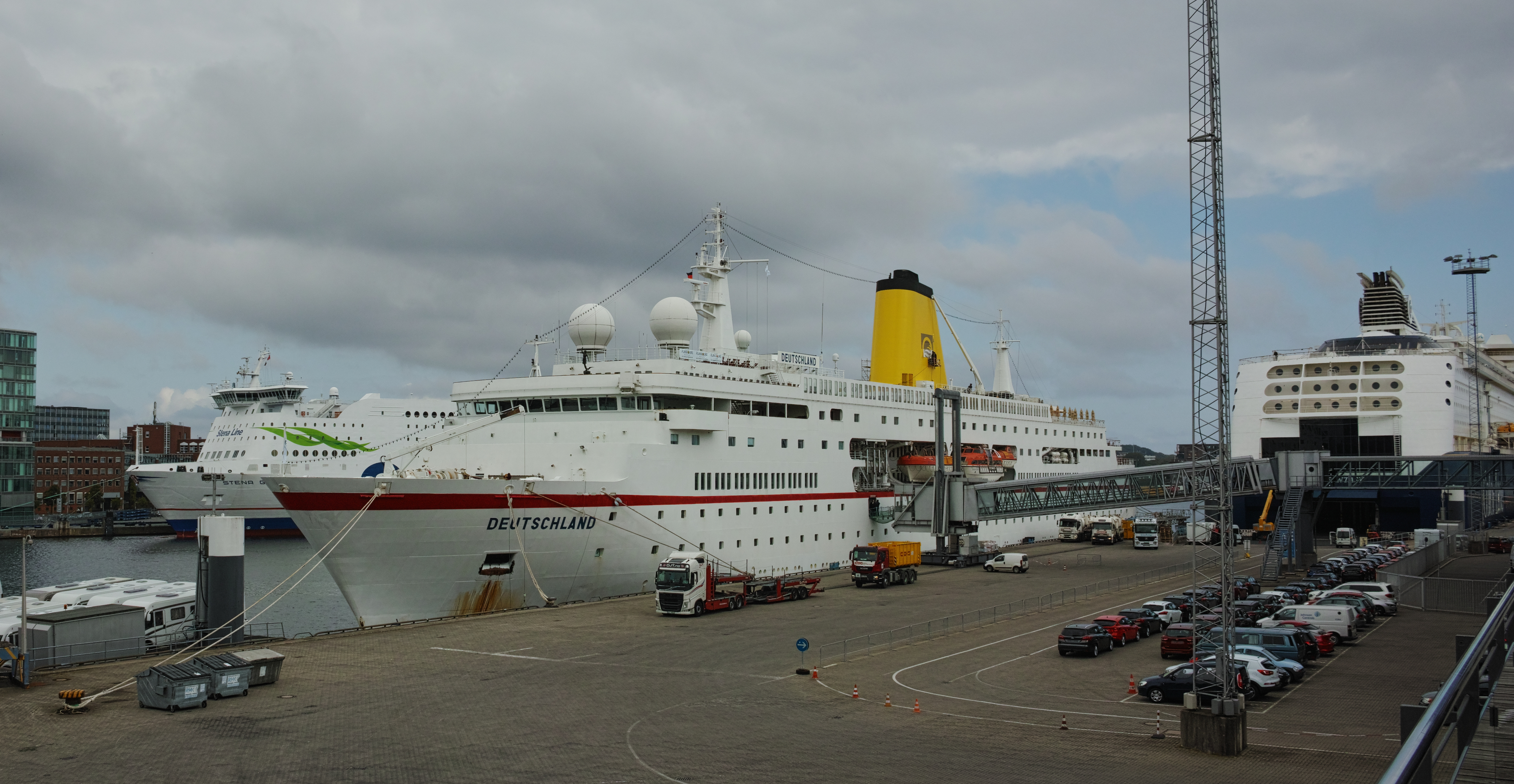
Deutschland sailing for Plantours Charter, Kiel, 9 June 2015. Painters can be seen applying the operator's logo to the funnel.

In 2000, Air France Flight 4590 crashed near Paris, killing all 100 passengers and 9 crew members on board. The New York City-bound Concorde charter flight had been carrying passengers for a sixteen-day cruise to Manta, Ecuador on board MS Deutschland. Despite the accident, the cruise continued as planned and was later sailed to Sydney, Australia for the 2000 Summer Olympics for use as an entertainment ship.

During the 2012 Summer Olympics in London, the German Olympic Committee used the MS Deutschland as a hospitality ship.

On 19 May 2015 the MS Deutschland was sold over to the Absolute Nevada company based in the United States, which purchased the ship for approximately $21 million. The new owners took on approximately half of the crew. Initially the ship was planned to serve as a floating university for the American organization Semester at Sea and in the process was reflagged to Nassau in the Bahamas. It was proposed that the ship would be renamed World Odyssey following a refit at a northern European shipyard.

On 31 May 2015, Plantours announced that they would be chartering the ship for four sailings between 9 June 2015 and 29 July 2015 whilst its usual ship MS Hamburg was repaired. The crew of MS Hamburg travelled to Gibraltar to prepare the ship, before guests embarked on 9 June 2015 in Kiel. MS Deutschland was bigger and was able to offer 80 more cabins than MS Hamburg. It was on this occasion that MS Deutschland began sailing under the Bahamas flag, and its funnel was painted into Plantours yellow branding.

From 20 June 2015 to 10 August 2015 the ship carried cruise tours to the North Sea, Norwegian Fjords, Svalbard, Greenland, the Faroes and Shetland Islands and to Hamburg city before ending in Kiel.

On 27 July 2015 the new owners of the ship announced that it would alternate between two roles. For part of the year the ship would travel as World Odyssey transporting Semester at Sea students, and for the other part of the year it would be chartered to the German cruise company Phoenix Reisen, sailing under its traditional MS Deutschland name. For this period the ship would carry two names, one for winter, other for summer.

During the COVID-19 pandemic, the crew was locked down in the ship which was moored in a basin of the port of Caen.

In May 2026, following the end of Phoenix Reisen's charter of the vessel as Deutschland, the ship was scheduled to resume service for Semester at Sea under the name World Odyssey. The ship left Phoenix service in September 2026 after arriving in Bremerhaven.

As floating campus, the university ship opens the 2026-2027 Brazilian cruise season.

== Incidents ==
At approximately 12:30 on 23 May 2010 whilst in the Norwegian port of Eidfjord, Norway, a fire was detected in the engine room. On board were at that time 607 (or 608) people, including 364 passengers. All passengers and most of the crew and two Norwegian pilots were evacuated safely from the ship, while only a small part of the crew remained on board. The fire was isolated to a limited area of the ship. The ship's 364 passengers travelled home. MS Deutschland was then towed by tug boats to the Blohm + Voss shipyard in Hamburg for docking and repair, where the ship remained in the shipyard for thirty days. The fire damage had cost approximately two million euro and was paid by the ship's insurers. Three trips were cancelled and service resumed on 3 July 2010, with a departure from Hamburg.

On 15 January 2012, the ship grounded in the Beagle Channel at the tip of South America. No one was injured and the ship was able to continue its journey after an investigation by the Federal Bureau for Maritime Casualty Investigation.

== Popular culture ==
- The German television show Das Traumschiff ("The Dream Ship") was filmed on board for fifteen years as the MS Deutschland traveled to tourist destinations around the world.
- In the first episode of Deutschland 86, the ship appears in the first scene docked as World Odyssey and is referenced in the final scene as a character watches Das Traumschiff.
