= MV Heidelberg =

History
- Name: Heidelberg
- Maiden voyage: 16 March 2004
- Identification: ENI number: 04802890; MMSI number: 269057334; Callsign: HE7334
- Status: In service

General characteristics
- Type: Cruise ship
- Length: 110 m (360 ft 11 in)
- Beam: 11.2 m (36 ft 9 in)
- Draught: 1.6 m (5 ft 3 in)
- Decks: 4
- Propulsion: Twin screw
- Crew: 43

MV Heidelberg was built in 2004. Carrying only 110 passengers in 56 cabins.
