= Nettelbeck =

Nettelbeck is a surname. Notable people with this surname include:

- Craig Nettelbeck, Australian footballer
- F. A. Nettelbeck, American poet
- Paul Nettelbeck, German long-distance runner
- Sandra Nettelbeck, German film director
- Ted Nettelbeck (born 1936), Australian psychologist and jazz pianist
- Uwe Nettelbeck, German record producer and journalist
