= Barrow-in-Furness Borough Council elections =

Local government elections in Cumbria, England

Barrow-in-Furness Borough Council in Cumbria, England, was elected every four years. This was changed in 2011 from the previous situation where one-third of the council was elected each year, followed by one year where there was an election to Cumbria County Council instead.

The council was established in 1974 and abolished in 2023.

From the last boundary changes in 2008 until the council's abolition in 2023, 36 councillors were elected from 13 wards.

== Political control ==
The first election to the council was held in 1973, initially operating as a shadow authority alongside the outgoing authorities until the new arrangements came into effect on 1 April 1974. Political control of the council from 1974 until its abolition in 2023 was as follows:

Party in control	Years
Labour	1974–1976
Conservative	1976–1979
Labour	1979–1991
No overall control	1991–1994
Labour	1994–1999
No overall control	1999–2003
Labour	2003–2006
No overall control	2006–2011
Labour	2011–2023

=== Leadership ===
The leaders of the council from 2011 until 2023 were:

Councillor	Party	From	To
Jack Richardson	Conservative		May 2011
Dave Pidduck	Labour	17 May 2011	20 May 2019
Ann Thomson	Labour	20 May 2019	31 Jan 2023

== Council elections ==
- 1973 Barrow-in-Furness Borough Council election
- 1976 Barrow-in-Furness Borough Council election
- 1979 Barrow-in-Furness Borough Council election (New ward boundaries)
- 1980 Barrow-in-Furness Borough Council election
- 1982 Barrow-in-Furness Borough Council election
- 1983 Barrow-in-Furness Borough Council election
- 1984 Barrow-in-Furness Borough Council election
- 1986 Barrow-in-Furness Borough Council election
- 1987 Barrow-in-Furness Borough Council election
- 1988 Barrow-in-Furness Borough Council election
- 1990 Barrow-in-Furness Borough Council election
- 1991 Barrow-in-Furness Borough Council election
- 1992 Barrow-in-Furness Borough Council election
- 1994 Barrow-in-Furness Borough Council election
- 1995 Barrow-in-Furness Borough Council election
- 1996 Barrow-in-Furness Borough Council election
- 1998 Barrow-in-Furness Borough Council election
- 1999 Barrow-in-Furness Borough Council election (New ward boundaries)
- 2000 Barrow-in-Furness Borough Council election
- 2002 Barrow-in-Furness Borough Council election
- 2003 Barrow-in-Furness Borough Council election
- 2004 Barrow-in-Furness Borough Council election
- 2006 Barrow-in-Furness Borough Council election
- 2007 Barrow-in-Furness Borough Council election
- 2008 Barrow-in-Furness Borough Council election (New ward boundaries reduced the number of seats by 2)
- 2010 Barrow-in-Furness Borough Council election
- 2011 Barrow-in-Furness Borough Council election
- 2015 Barrow-in-Furness Borough Council election
- 2019 Barrow-in-Furness Borough Council election

== Borough result maps ==
2002 results map

2003 results map

2004 results map

2006 results map

2007 results map

2008 results map

2010 results map

2011 results map

2015 results map

2019 results map

== By-election results ==
=== 1994-1998 ===
Risedale By-Election 1 May 1997
Party	Candidate	Votes	%	±%
Labour		1,592	65.0	−15.8
Conservative		500	20.4	+1.2
Independent		357	14.6	+14.6
Majority		1,092	44.6	
Turnout		2,449		
Labour hold		Swing		

Walney North By-Election 1 May 1997
Party	Candidate	Votes	%	±%
Labour		2,145	71.3	−1.4
Conservative		864	28.7	+1.4
Majority		1,281	42.6	
Turnout		3,009		
Labour hold		Swing		

=== 1998-2002 ===
Hawcoat By-Election 27 September 2001
Party	Candidate	Votes	%	±%
Conservative		587	65.1	−15.3
Labour		315	34.9	+15.3
Majority		272	30.2	
Turnout		902	20.8	
Conservative hold		Swing		

=== 2006-2011 ===
Dalton North By-Election 18 January 2007
Party	Candidate	Votes	%	±%
Conservative	Katherine Unwin	400	44.3	−8.0
Labour	Denis Bell	355	39.4	−8.3
Socialist People's Party	June Gibbons	147	16.3	+16.3
Majority		45	4.9	
Turnout		902	18.6	
Conservative hold		Swing		

Newbarns By-Election 4 September 2008
Party	Candidate	Votes	%	±%
Conservative	Bob Maltman	478	52.3	+9.4
Labour	Lorraine Biggins	177	19.4	−1.7
Socialist People's Party	Sarah Martinez	155	17.0	+17.0
BNP	Mike Ashburner	104	11.4	+11.4
Majority		301	32.93	
Turnout		914	21.9	
Conservative hold		Swing		

=== 2015-2019 ===
Risedale by-election 29 October 2015
Party	Candidate	Votes	%	±%
Labour	Michael Cassells	428	53.0	−24.1
UKIP	Colin Rudd	193	23.9	+1.0
Conservative	Carole Friend	187	23.1	+23.1
Majority		235	29.1	
Turnout		808		
Labour hold		Swing		

Dalton South by-election 5 May 2016
Party	Candidate	Votes	%	±%
Labour	Shaun Blezzard	595	47.7	−3.4
Conservative	Des English	415	33.3	−15.6
UKIP	Dick Young	237	19.0	N/A
Majority		180	14.4	
Turnout			21.4	
Labour gain from Conservative		Swing		

The by-election was triggered by the death of Councillor Bill Bleasdale of the Conservative Party.

Parkside by-election 8 September 2016
Party	Candidate	Votes	%	±%
Labour	Lee Roberts	317	52.1	−3.0
Conservative	Roy Worthington	257	42.3	−2.6
UKIP	Colin Rudd	34	5.6	+5.6
Majority		60	9.9	
Turnout		608		
Labour hold		Swing		

=== 2019-2023 ===
Hindpool by-election 6th May 2021
Party	Candidate	Votes	%	±%
Labour	Jo Tyson	600	62.6	+2.9
Conservative	Niyall Phillips	359	37.4	+17.1
Majority		241	25.1	
Turnout		959		
Labour hold		Swing		

Roosecote by-election 6th May 2021
Party	Candidate	Votes	%	±%
Conservative	Jay Zaccarini	881	61.0	+15.3
Labour	Paul Griffiths	564	39.0	+5.5
Majority		317	21.9	
Turnout		1,445		
Conservative hold		Swing		
