= 2015 Barrow-in-Furness Borough Council election =

2015 UK local government election

Map of the results

The 2015 Barrow-in-Furness Borough Council election took place on 7 May 2015 to elect members of Barrow-in-Furness Borough Council in Cumbria, England. This was on the same day as other local elections.

Control of the council was held by the Labour Party, who had won from no overall control at the 2011 elections. Although Labour gained a higher percentage of the vote than in 2011, the Conservative Party gained 2 seats. The Socialist People's Party, which had held seats in Barrow from 1998 until 2011, folded in 2015 and so did not run for election.

== Election result ==
Barrow-in-Furness local election result 2015
Party	Seats	Gains	Losses	Net gain/loss	Seats %	Votes %	Votes	+/−
Labour	27			-2	75	63.9	44714	+8.2
Conservative	9			+2	25	30.3	21198	-7.0
UKIP	0				0	5.2	3614	+4.4
Liberal Democrats	0				0	0.6	416	+0.6
