= 2008 Barrow-in-Furness Borough Council election =

2008 UK local government election

Map of the results of the 2008 Barrow-in-Furness council election.

Elections to Barrow-in-Furness Borough Council were held on 1 May 2008. The whole of the council was up for election, with the number of councillors falling from 38 to 36, as a result of ward boundary changes enacted in February 2008. Councillors were elected for terms ranging between two and four years; where more than one councillor was elected in a ward, the councillor with the highest number of votes was granted the longer term.

The election results were both tight and dramatic, with well-known local councillors failing to be re-elected and recounts in certain wards delaying the announcement of votes. No party gained control of the council, and local news sources claimed that the biggest winners from the election were the local People's Party, who quadrupled their number of councillors, and independent candidates campaigning against plans to open an Academy school in the town. Mirroring the results in other local elections across England and Wales held on the same day, the Conservative Party ended as the largest group on the council with the Labour Party's representation dropping heavily.

== Pre-Election Council ==
Following the 2007 election and the defection of two Conservative Party councillors to the Liberal Democrats in October 2007, the composition of the council entering the election was:

Affiliation	Members
Conservative Party	17
Labour Party	16
Liberal Democrats	2
Independent	2
People's Party	1

== Election result ==
Barrow-in-Furness local election result 2008
Party	Seats	Gains	Losses	Net gain/loss	Seats %	Votes %	Votes	+/−
Conservative	17	3	3	0	47.2	42.6	15 756	-3.5%
Labour	8	0	8	-8	22.0	34.4	12 724	-3.7%
Independent	6	5	1	4	16.7	14.1	5 211	+5.0%
Socialist People's Party	4	3	0	3	11.0	4.9	1 828	-0.3%
Liberal Democrats	1	1	2	-1	2.8	3.2	1 173	+3.2%
BNP	0	0	0	0	0.0	0.9	321	+0.2%

The breakdown of councillor terms as a result of the election is shown below. The seats of the ten councillors with two year terms were contested in the 2010 council election.

Affiliation	Term Length		
Affiliation	2 Years	3 Years	4 Years
Conservative Party	4	6	6
Labour Party	2	3	3
Independent	2	1	3
People's Party	1	2	1
Liberal Democrats	1	0	0

== Ward results ==
Barrow Island
Party	Candidate	Votes	%	±%
Independent	Eric Wood	381	80.9	
Labour	Trevor Biggins	90	19.1	
Majority		291	61.8	
Turnout		471	25.2	

Central (2)
Party	Candidate	Votes	%	±%
Labour	Mary Irwin	232		
Socialist People's Party	Rosmerie Hamezeian	224		
Independent	Norman Hill	176		
Labour	Margaret Thomson	174		
Socialist People's Party	Sarah Martinez	158		
Turnout		964	20.3	

Dalton North (3)
Party	Candidate	Votes	%	±%
Conservative	Jill Heath	870		
Conservative	Kath Unwin	812		
Conservative	Bill Bleasdale	730		
Labour	Dennis Bell	502		
Labour	Jayne Phizacklea	432		
Labour	Dermot O'Connor	386		
Liberal Democrats	Lynn Murray	376		
Turnout		4,108	32.0	

Dalton South (3)
Party	Candidate	Votes	%	±%
Conservative	Timothy Bell	689		
Conservative	Dorothy James	623		
Independent	John Millar	577		
Conservative	David Gill	576		
Liberal Democrats	Frank Murray	377		
Labour	Wendy Maddox	369		
Labour	Barry Doughty	347		
Labour	Graham Chester	329		
Turnout		3,887	31.1	

Hawcoat (3)
Party	Candidate	Votes	%	±%
Independent	Michael Stephenson	922		
Conservative	Dave Roberts	779		
Conservative	Jack Richardson	720		
Independent	Chloe Lancaster	719		
Conservative	Bill Joughin	705		
Labour	Rebbecca Melling	290		
Turnout		4,135	42.2	

Hindpool (3)
Party	Candidate	Votes	%	±%
Labour	David Pidduck	445		
Labour	Michelle Roberts	441		
Conservative	Phil Murray	359		
Labour	Kenneth Beeres	335		
Turnout		1,580	20.4	

Newbarns (3)
Party	Candidate	Votes	%	±%
Conservative	Dorothy Dawes	609		
Conservative	Colin Liversedge	516		
Independent	Philip Solloway	511		
Conservative	Bob Maltman	486		
Labour	Charles Elliot	299		
Labour	Lorraine Biggins	243		
Labour	Allison Johnston	216		
Turnout		2,880	29.9	

Ormsgill (3)
Party	Candidate	Votes	%	±%
Socialist People's Party	Jim Hamezeian	632		
Socialist People's Party	Sheila Begley	407		
Socialist People's Party	William McEwan	407		
Labour	Stephen Forbes	360		
Conservative	Alison Giles	341		
Labour	Stephen Groundwater	295		
Labour	Ernest Wilson	280		
Independent	Margie Arts	235		
Independent	James Tongue	226		
BNP	Mike Ashburner	185		
BNP	Eion McPoland	136		
Turnout		3,504	31.4	

Parkside (3)
Party	Candidate	Votes	%	±%
Independent	Jim Jefferson	495		
Independent	Lisa Hammond	476		
Liberal Democrats	Dominic McCavish	420		
Labour	David McCormack	403		
Labour	Marie Derbyshire	390		
Labour	Tricia Kegg	375		
Conservative	Linda Last	371		
Conservative	Tina Macur	300		
Conservative	Shirley Richardson	299		
Turnout		3,529	32.0	

Risedale (3)
Party	Candidate	Votes	%	±%
Conservative	Des English	461		
Labour	Jean Waiting	427		
Labour	Jeffery Garnett	395		
Labour	Debra Seward	387		
Turnout		1,670	21.6	

Roosecote (3)
Party	Candidate	Votes	%	±%
Conservative	Ray Guselli	805		
Conservative	Ken Williams	761		
Conservative	Rory McClure	743		
Independent	Wayne Butler	493		
Labour	Kenneth Thomson	290		
Labour	Lovinia Williams	241		
Turnout		3,333	36.4	

Walney North (3)
Party	Candidate	Votes	%	±%
Labour	Des Barlow	746		
Labour	Anita Husband	680		
Labour	Anthony Callister	614		
Conservative	Steve Smart	518		
Conservative	Shahnaz Asghar	436		
Conservative	Mike Macur	424		
Turnout		3,418	30.1	

Walney South (3)
Party	Candidate	Votes	%	±%
Conservative	David Marcus	637		
Conservative	Ollie Flitcroft	594		
Conservative	Alan Pemberton	592		
Labour	Colin Thomson	528		
Labour	John Murphy	525		
Labour	Robert Pointer	506		
Turnout		3,382	29.8	
