= 2010 Barrow-in-Furness Borough Council election =

2010 UK local government election

Map of the results of the 2010 Barrow-in-Furness council election. Labour in red and Conservative in blue. Wards in grey were not contested in 2010.

The 2010 Barrow-in-Furness Borough Council election took place on 6 May 2010 to elect members of Barrow-in-Furness Borough Council in Cumbria, England. One third of the council was up for election and the council stayed under no overall control.

After the election, the composition of the council was:

- Labour 16
- Conservative 13
- Independent 5
- Socialist People's Party 2

== Background ==
The 2010 election was the last where only a third of the council was contested. This meant 12 seats were up for election, with only Barrow Island ward not having an election. From the 2011 election Barrow-in-Furness moved to having full council elections every 4 years.

Before the election the Conservative party had 16 councillors, compared to 8 for Labour, 7 independents, 4 Socialist People's Party and 1 Liberal Democrat. However, in the lead up to election independent councillor John Millar joined the Conservatives and defended Dalton South as a Conservative in the election.

The Conservatives hoped to win a majority on the council, defending their record as the council administration by pointing to a list of achievements and saying they had kept council tax levels low. However Labour were only defending 2 seats and attacked the Conservative record, while calling for more council apprenticeships and the return of a scheme of lower bus fares for pensioners.

== Election result ==
The results saw Labour gain 8 seats to double the number of councillors the party held on the council to 16. The gains came at the expense of all the other groups on the council, with only the Conservatives holding 2 seats in Hawcoat and Roosecote.

Following the election the Conservative leader of the council, Jack Richardson, was re-elected and Conservative Rory McClure became mayor. This came after all 5 independents backed the Conservatives in the vote and the 2 Socialist Peoples Party councillors abstained.

Barrow-in-Furness local election result 2010
Party	Seats	Gains	Losses	Net gain/loss	Seats %	Votes %	Votes	+/−
Labour	10	8	0	+8	83.3	55.1	17,250	+20.7%
Conservative	2	0	4	-4	16.7	37.3	11,686	-5.3%
Socialist People's Party	0	0	2	-2	0	4.2	1,304	-0.7%
Independent	0	0	1	-1	0	1.6	490	-12.5%
Liberal Democrats	0	0	1	-1	0	1.5	472	-1.7%
BNP	0	0	0	0	0	0.4	113	-0.5%

== Ward results ==
Central
Party	Candidate	Votes	%	±%
Labour	Trevor Biggins	836	62.2	
Socialist People's Party	Rosemarie Hamezeian	258	19.2	
Conservative	Elaine Burley	251	18.7	
Majority		578	43.0	
Turnout		1,345		
Labour gain from Socialist People's Party		Swing		

Dalton North
Party	Candidate	Votes	%	±%
Labour	Barry Doughty	1,699	54.1	
Conservative	Bill Bleasdale	1,441	45.9	
Majority		258	8.2	
Turnout		3,140		
Labour gain from Conservative		Swing		

Dalton South
Party	Candidate	Votes	%	±%
Labour	Wendy Maddox	1,613	53.0	
Conservative	John Millar	1,430	47.0	
Majority		183	6.0	
Turnout		3,043		
Labour gain from Conservative		Swing		

Hawcoat
Party	Candidate	Votes	%	±%
Conservative	Jack Richardson	1,847	61.9	
Labour	Rebecca Melling	1,138	38.1	
Majority		709	23.8	
Turnout		2,985		
Conservative hold		Swing		

Hindpool
Party	Candidate	Votes	%	±%
Labour	Margaret Thomson	1,368	61.9	
Conservative	Mark Burley	514	23.3	
Socialist People's Party	Helen Robinson	328	14.8	
Majority		854	38.6	
Turnout		2,210		
Labour gain from Conservative		Swing		

Newbarns
Party	Candidate	Votes	%	±%
Labour	John Murphy	1,218	44.8	
Conservative	Wendy McClure	1,011	37.2	
Independent	Phil Solloway	490	18.0	
Majority		207	7.6	
Turnout		2,719		
Labour gain from Independent		Swing		

Ormsgill
Party	Candidate	Votes	%	±%
Labour	Robert Pointer	1,384	57.0	
Conservative	Teri-Ann Gibney	580	23.9	
Socialist People's Party	Sheila Begley	466	19.2	
Majority		804	33.1	
Turnout		2,430		
Labour gain from Socialist People's Party		Swing		

Parkside
Party	Candidate	Votes	%	±%
Labour	Michael Sweeney	1,411	51.5	
Conservative	Linda Last	746	27.2	
Liberal Democrats	Dominic McCavish	472	17.2	
BNP	Mike Ashburner	113	4.1	
Majority		665	24.3	
Turnout		2,742		
Labour gain from Liberal Democrats		Swing		

Risedale
Party	Candidate	Votes	%	±%
Labour	Jeffrey Garnett	1,647	65.9	
Conservative	Levi Gill	599	24.0	
Socialist People's Party	Daniel Tyson	252	10.1	
Majority		1,048	42.0	
Turnout		2,498		
Labour hold		Swing		

Roosecote
Party	Candidate	Votes	%	±%
Conservative	Rory McClure	1,483	53.5	
Labour	Kenneth Beeres	1,289	46.5	
Majority		194	7.0	
Turnout		2,772		
Conservative hold		Swing		

Walney North
Party	Candidate	Votes	%	±%
Labour	Anthony Callister	1,828	68.9	
Conservative	Stephen Smart	825	31.1	
Majority		1,003	37.8	
Turnout		2,653		
Labour hold		Swing		

Walney South
Party	Candidate	Votes	%	±%
Labour	Colin Thomson	1,819	65.5	
Conservative	Alan Pemberton	959	34.5	
Majority		860	31.0	
Turnout		2,778		
Labour gain from Conservative		Swing		
