= Barrow-in-Furness (disambiguation) =

Barrow-in-Furness is a port town and civil parish in Cumbria, England.

Barrow-in-Furness may also refer to:

- Barrow and Furness (UK Parliament constituency), a constituency in Cumbria.
- Barrow-in-Furness railway station, a railway station on the Cumbrian Coast Line and Furness Line.
- Borough of Barrow-in-Furness, former local government district with borough status.
