= Barrow Bombers =

British speedway team

Club information
- Track address: Holker Street; Barrow-in-Furness
- Country: England
- Founded: 1930
- Closed: 1985

Club facts
- Colours: Yellow
- Track size: 379 metres (414 yd)

The Barrow Bombers were a speedway team promoted in Barrow-in-Furness that existed at various times from 1930 to 1985.

== History ==
Speedway arrived in Barrow during 1930 when a number of meetings were conducted at Holker Street, the home of Barrow A.F.C., the town's football club. Organised by the Northern Sports Club, the first meeting was held on 12 June 1930.

Racing moved to Little Park in Roose during 1931 but crowd levels were insufficient.

In 1972, speedway returned to Barrow after a 42-year absence. The former Romford Bombers promotion who started the season at the West Ham Stadium in London moved the team north to Holker Street, which had recently installed a circuit around the pitch. The team were initially called the Barrow Happy Faces as their sponsor at the time was Duckhams Oil - its happy face logo was prominently displayed on the team's race jackets. The team finished 9th during the 1972 British League Division Two season.

The team were renamed Barrow Bombers for the 1973 and 1974 seasons, where they finished 10th and 12th respectively. Despite good crowds, a new home had to be found for the team after the end of the 1974 season, when problems with ground sharing became insurmountable.

Local businessman Cliff Hindle built a new stadium at Park Road, which opened halfway through the 1977 season for a short series of open meetings. In 1978 a team was entered under the name Barrow Furness Flyers, but they finished bottom of the National League. Crowds were poor and the track closed after only one season.

Speedway in Barrow was revived once again in 1984, under the promotion of ex-Barrow rider Chris Roynon. A series of challenge matches were held to gauge public support. Interest was such that a team was entered for the 1985 season under the name of the Barrow Blackhawks. After a disastrous start to the season with an understrength team, the Blackhawks were thrown out of the league. A number of challenge matches were held for the remainder of the season in front of low crowds before the track once again closed.

== Season summary ==
Year and league	Position	Notes
1972 British League Division Two season	9th	rode as Happy Faces
1973 British League Division Two season	10th	
1974 British League Division Two season	12th	
1978 National League season	20th	rode as Furness Flyers
1985 National League season	N/A	rode as Blackhawks, withdrew, results expunged

== Notable riders ==
- Bob Coles
- Tom Owen
- Mike Sampson

== See also ==
- Category:Barrow Bombers riders
- List of defunct motorcycle speedway teams in the United Kingdom
