= 2000 Barrow-in-Furness Borough Council election =

2000 UK local government election

The 2000 Barrow-in-Furness Borough Council election took place on 4 May 2000 to elect members of Barrow-in-Furness Borough Council in Cumbria, England. One third of the council was up for election and the council stayed under no overall control.

After the election, the composition of the council was:

- Labour 18
- Conservative 16
- People's Party 4

== Results ==
Barrow-in-Furness local election result 2000
Party	Seats	Gains	Losses	Net gain/loss	Seats %	Votes %	Votes	+/−
Conservative	6	0	1	-1	50.0	43.7	5,398	
Labour	5	1	1	0	41.7	37.4	4,614	
Socialist People's Party	1	1	0	+1	8.3	17.0	2,093	
Liberal Democrats	0	0	0	0	0	1.9	238	

== Ward results ==
Central
Party	Candidate	Votes	%	±%
Labour	Edith Garside	328	44.4	
Socialist People's Party	Joan Grainger	260	35.2	
Conservative	William Palmer	150	20.3	
Majority		68	9.2	
Turnout		738		

Dalton North
Party	Candidate	Votes	%	±%
Conservative	Edward Wilkinson	465	42.7	
Labour	Leslie Sherman	334	30.7	
Socialist People's Party	Thomas Weall	200	18.4	
Liberal Democrats	James Young	90	8.3	
Majority		131	12.0	
Turnout		1,089		

Dalton South
Party	Candidate	Votes	%	±%
Conservative	Jack Dent	439	42.7	
Labour	Robert Wyborn	290	28.2	
Socialist People's Party	Maureen Rothery	150	14.6	
Liberal Democrats	Helene Young	148	14.4	
Majority		149	14.5	
Turnout		1,027		

Hawcoat
Party	Candidate	Votes	%	±%
Conservative	Peter Clafton	1,084	80.4	
Labour	Stephen Groundwater	264	19.6	
Majority		820	60.8	
Turnout		1,348		

Hindpool
Party	Candidate	Votes	%	±%
Labour	Diane Charlton	430	48.2	
Socialist People's Party	Rosemarie Hamezeian	314	35.2	
Conservative	Desmond English	149	16.7	
Majority		116	13.0	
Turnout		893		

Newbarns
Party	Candidate	Votes	%	±%
Conservative	Robert Maltman	717	60.6	
Labour	Marie Derbyshire	306	25.9	
Socialist People's Party	David Davies	160	13.5	
Majority		411	34.7	
Turnout		1,183		

Ormsgill
Party	Candidate	Votes	%	±%
Socialist People's Party	Maurice Edmonds	343	38.8	
Labour	Peter Todd	333	37.7	
Conservative	Daniel Bell	208	23.5	
Majority		10	1.1	
Turnout		884		
Socialist People's Party gain from Labour		Swing		

Parkside
Party	Candidate	Votes	%	±%
Conservative	Pamela Smith	529	56.1	
Labour	Melvyn Worth	414	43.9	
Majority		115	12.2	
Turnout		943		

Risedale
Party	Candidate	Votes	%	±%
Labour	Terence Waiting	396	43.8	
Socialist People's Party	Alexander Dacre	271	29.9	
Conservative	Anne-Marie Sheppard	238	26.3	
Majority		125	13.8	
Turnout		905		

Roosecote
Party	Candidate	Votes	%	±%
Conservative	Ramon Guselli	729	64.9	
Labour	Wilfred Heywood	395	35.1	
Majority		334	29.7	
Turnout		1,124		

Walney North
Party	Candidate	Votes	%	±%
Labour	Anthony Callister	536	52.5	
Conservative	Alan Rothery	284	27.8	
Socialist People's Party	William Tucker	200	19.6	
Majority		252	24.7	
Turnout		1,020		

Walney South
Party	Candidate	Votes	%	±%
Labour	John Murphy	588	49.5	
Conservative	David Roberts	406	34.1	
Socialist People's Party	Peter Rigg	195	16.4	
Majority		182	15.3	
Turnout		1,189		
