= 1999 Barrow-in-Furness Borough Council election =

English Local Council Election

Elections to Barrow-in-Furness Borough Council were held on 6 May 1999. The whole council was up for election with boundary changes since the last election in 1998. The Labour party lost overall control of the council to no overall control.

== Results ==
Barrow-in-Furness local election result 1999
Party	Seats	Gains	Losses	Net gain/loss	Seats %	Votes %	Votes	+/−
Labour	18			-5	47.4			
Conservative	17			+7	44.7			
Others	3			-1	7.9			
