= 2002 Barrow-in-Furness Borough Council election =

2002 UK local government election

Results of the 2002 Barrow-in-Furness Borough Council election

Elections to Barrow-in-Furness Borough Council were held on 2 May 2002. One third of the council was up for election and the council stayed under no overall control.

After the election, the composition of the council was

- Labour 19
- Conservative 15
- Independent 3
- Others 1

== Election result ==
Barrow-in-Furness local election result 2002
Party	Seats	Gains	Losses	Net gain/loss	Seats %	Votes %	Votes	+/−
Labour	8			+1	61.5	46.9	6,768	+9.5%
Conservative	4			-1	30.8	36.0	5,198	-7.7%
Independent	1			0	7.7	6.0	865	+6.0%
Socialist People's Party	0			0	0	10.2	1,468	-6.8%
UKIP	0			0	0	0.9	130	+0.9%

== Ward results ==
Barrow Island
Party	Candidate	Votes	%	±%
Independent	James Tongue	262	45.5	
Labour	Stephen Smart	240	41.7	
Socialist People's Party	Margaret Dacre	74	12.8	
Majority		22	3.8	
Turnout		576		

Central
Party	Candidate	Votes	%	±%
Labour	Mary Irwin	494	64.7	+20.3
Conservative	William Palmer	140	18.3	−2.0
UKIP	John Smith	130	17.0	+17.0
Majority		354	46.4	+37.2
Turnout		764		

Dalton North
Party	Candidate	Votes	%	±%
Labour	Denis Bell	579	45.0	+14.3
Conservative	Alan Rothery	371	28.8	−13.9
Independent	Thomas Weall	336	26.1	+7.7
Majority		208	16.2	
Turnout		1,286		

Dalton South
Party	Candidate	Votes	%	±%
Conservative	Frank Murray	474	38.8	−3.9
Labour	Eric Knibbs	402	32.9	+4.7
Independent	Ian Singleton	173	14.2	+14.2
Independent	Helene Young	94	7.7	+7.7
Socialist People's Party	Dorothy Turner	79	6.5	−8.1
Majority		72	5.9	−8.6
Turnout		1,222		

Hawcoat
Party	Candidate	Votes	%	±%
Conservative	Bill Joughin	1,069	69.5	−10.9
Labour	Marie Derbyshire	340	22.1	+2.5
Socialist People's Party	Joseph Quinn	130	8.4	+8.4
Majority		729	47.4	−13.4
Turnout		1,539		

Hindpool
Party	Candidate	Votes	%	±%
Labour	David Pidduck	547	60.4	+12.2
Socialist People's Party	Barbara Eager	210	23.2	−12.0
Conservative	John Murray	148	16.4	−0.3
Majority		337	37.2	+24.2
Turnout		905		

Newbarns
Party	Candidate	Votes	%	±%
Conservative	Dorothy Dawes	657	49.7	−10.9
Labour	Peter Todd	512	38.8	+12.9
Socialist People's Party	Norman Graham	152	11.5	−2.0
Majority		145	10.9	−23.8
Turnout		1,321		

Ormsgill
Party	Candidate	Votes	%	±%
Labour	Ernest Wilson	468	44.2	+6.5
Socialist People's Party	Rosemarie Hamezeian	414	39.1	+0.3
Conservative	Kristina Bell	177	16.7	−6.8
Majority		54	5.1	
Turnout		1,059		

Parkside
Party	Candidate	Votes	%	±%
Labour	Michelle Roberts	625	56.4	+0.3
Conservative	Tina Macur	483	43.6	−0.3
Majority		142	12.8	+0.6
Turnout		1,108		

Risedale
Party	Candidate	Votes	%	±%
Labour	Jean Waiting	519	54.0	+10.2
Socialist People's Party	Alexandre Dacre	267	27.8	−2.1
Conservative	Desmond English	175	18.2	−8.1
Majority		252	26.2	+12.4
Turnout		961		

Roosecote
Party	Candidate	Votes	%	±%
Conservative	Kenneth Williams	757	59.2	−5.7
Labour	Maire Read	522	40.8	+5.7
Majority		235	18.4	−11.3
Turnout		1,279		

Walney North
Party	Candidate	Votes	%	±%
Labour	Mary Messingham	774	64.7	+12.2
Conservative	Ronald Hiseman	281	23.5	−4.3
Socialist People's Party	Kelly White	142	11.9	−7.7
Majority		493	41.2	+16.5
Turnout		1,197		

Walney South
Party	Candidate	Votes	%	±%
Labour	Jeffrey Garnett	746	61.6	+12.1
Conservative	Rory McClure	466	38.4	+4.3
Majority		280	23.2	+7.9
Turnout		1,212		
