= 2006 Barrow-in-Furness Borough Council election =

2006 UK local government election

Results of the 2006 Barrow-in-Furness Borough Council election

Elections to Barrow-in-Furness Borough Council were held on 4 May 2006. One third of the council was up for election and the Labour party lost overall control of the council to no overall control.

After the election, the composition of the council was

- Labour 18
- Conservative 17
- Independent 2
- People's Party 1

== Election result ==
Barrow-in-Furness local election result 2006
Party	Seats	Gains	Losses	Net gain/loss	Seats %	Votes %	Votes	+/−
Conservative	10	5	0	+5	66.7	52.2	8,850	+12.2%
Labour	3	0	6	-6	20.0	33.8	5,730	-5.0%
Independent	1	0	0	0	6.7	8.8	1,483	-0.3%
Socialist People's Party	1	1	0	+1	6.7	5.2	876	-3.2%

== Ward results ==
Barrow Island
Party	Candidate	Votes	%	±%
Independent	James Tongue	375	69.2	−0.5
Labour	Colin Thomson	167	30.8	+0.5
Majority		208	38.4	−1.0
Turnout		542		
Independent hold		Swing		

Central
Party	Candidate	Votes	%	±%
Labour	Mary Irwin	314	39.0	−8.5
Socialist People's Party	Rosemary Hamezeian	281	34.9	+16.6
Conservative	Desmond English	210	26.1	+9.2
Majority		33	4.1	−25.1
Turnout		805		
Labour hold		Swing		

Dalton North
Party	Candidate	Votes	%	±%
Conservative	Lynn Murray	725	52.3	+13.4
Labour	Dennis Bell	661	47.7	+16.9
Majority		64	4.6	−3.5
Turnout		1,386		
Conservative gain from Labour		Swing		

Dalton South
Party	Candidate	Votes	%	±%
Conservative	Frank Murray	666	50.3	+11.2
Labour	Charles Bell	657	49.7	+9.9
Majority		9	0.6	
Turnout		1,323		
Conservative hold		Swing		

Hawcoat
Party	Candidate	Votes	%	±%
Conservative	John Joughin	1,416	88.2	+6.4
Labour	Rebecca Melling	190	11.8	−6.4
Majority		1,226	76.4	+12.8
Turnout		1,606		
Conservative hold		Swing		

Hindpool
Party	Candidate	Votes	%	±%
Labour	David Pidduck	471	57.9	+6.8
Conservative	John Murray	343	42.1	+21.7
Majority		128	15.8	−12.6
Turnout		814		
Labour hold		Swing		

Newbarns (2)
Party	Candidate	Votes	%	±%
Conservative	Sheila Pears	735		
Conservative	Dorothy Dawes	640		
Independent	Nicholas Roberts	365		
Labour	Marie Derbyshire	309		
Labour	Malcolm Lawson	306		
Turnout		2,355		
Conservative hold		Swing		
Conservative hold		Swing		

Ormsgill
Party	Candidate	Votes	%	±%
Socialist People's Party	Jim Hamezeian	395	39.8	+6.3
Labour	Tricia Kegg	247	24.9	−11.2
Conservative	Tina Macur	238	24.0	+6.2
Independent	Margaret Arts	113	11.4	−1.2
Majority		148	14.9	
Turnout		993		
Socialist People's Party gain from Labour		Swing		

Parkside
Party	Candidate	Votes	%	±%
Conservative	Shirley Richardson	780	69.3	+37.8
Labour	Michelle Roberts	345	30.7	−5.6
Majority		435	38.6	
Turnout		1,125		
Conservative gain from Labour		Swing		

Risedale
Party	Candidate	Votes	%	±%
Conservative	Oliver Flitcroft	390	40.2	+19.9
Labour	Jean Waiting	380	39.2	−12.0
Socialist People's Party	Sarah Martinez	200	20.6	+2.7
Majority		10	1.0	
Turnout		970		
Conservative gain from Labour		Swing		

Roosecote
Party	Candidate	Votes	%	±%
Conservative	Kenneth Williams	1,065	70.7	+9.0
Labour	David McCormick	442	29.3	−9.0
Majority		623	41.4	+18.0
Turnout		1,507		
Conservative hold		Swing		

Walney North
Party	Candidate	Votes	%	±%
Labour	Anita Husband	458	35.2	−12.9
Conservative	Susannah Pearson	436	33.5	+5.6
Independent	Stephen Smart	407	31.3	+7.3
Majority		22	1.7	−18.5
Turnout		1,301		
Labour hold		Swing		

Walney South (2)
Party	Candidate	Votes	%	±%
Conservative	Michael Jones	641		
Conservative	Oliver Pearson	565		
Labour	Kenneth Beeres	394		
Labour	Robert Pointer	389		
Independent	Kenneth Arts	223		
Turnout		2,212		
Conservative gain from Labour		Swing		
Conservative gain from Labour		Swing		
