= 2004 Barrow-in-Furness Borough Council election =

2004 UK local government election

Results of the 2004 Barrow-in-Furness Borough Council election

Elections to Barrow-in-Furness Borough Council were held on 10 June 2004. One third of the council was up for election and the Labour party kept overall control of the council.

After the election, the composition of the council was

- Labour 24
- Conservative 12
- Independent 2

== Election result ==
Barrow-in-Furness local election result 2004
Party	Seats	Gains	Losses	Net gain/loss	Seats %	Votes %	Votes	+/−
Labour	8			+3	66.7	38.8	7,832	-2.8%
Conservative	4			-2	33.3	40.0	8,077	-2.1%
Independent	0			-1	0	9.1	1,843	+2.3%
Socialist People's Party	0			0	0	8.4	1,701	+2.2%
Liberal Democrats	0			0	0	2.8	559	+0.2%
UKIP	0			0	0	1.0	196	+0.4%

== Ward results ==
Central
Party	Candidate	Votes	%	±%
Labour	Edith Garside	538	47.5	−4.9
Socialist People's Party	Patricia Humes	207	18.3	−2.0
UKIP	John Smith	196	17.3	+6.9
Conservative	Shirley Richardson	191	16.9	+0.0
Majority		331	29.2	−2.9
Turnout		1,132		

Dalton North
Party	Candidate	Votes	%	±%
Conservative	William Crosthwaite	759	38.9	+4.8
Labour	Dennis Toye	600	30.8	−4.7
Independent	Thomas Weall	348	17.8	−12.5
Socialist People's Party	Elizabeth Gibbons	244	12.5	+12.5
Majority		159	8.1	
Turnout		1,951		

Dalton South
Party	Candidate	Votes	%	±%
Labour	Wendy Maddox	741	39.8	+4.4
Conservative	Lynn Murray	727	39.1	−5.2
Independent	James Young	392	21.1	+6.9
Majority		14	0.7	
Turnout		1,860		

Hawcoat
Party	Candidate	Votes	%	±%
Conservative	David Roberts	1,838	81.8	+2.9
Labour	Rebecca Melling	409	18.2	−2.9
Majority		1,429	63.6	+5.8
Turnout		2,247		

Hindpool
Party	Candidate	Votes	%	±%
Labour	Diane Charlton	645	51.1	−3.3
Socialist People's Party	Rosemarie Hamezeian	287	22.7	+0.6
Conservative	John Murray	258	20.4	−3.1
Independent	Leonard Atkinson	72	5.7	+5.7
Majority		358	28.4	−2.5
Turnout		1,262		

Newbarns
Party	Candidate	Votes	%	±%
Conservative	Robert Maltman	912	50.2	−15.2
Labour	Marie Derbyshire	685	37.7	+9.8
Socialist People's Party	William O'Brien	220	12.1	+5.4
Majority		227	12.5	−25.0
Turnout		1,817		

Ormsgill
Party	Candidate	Votes	%	±%
Labour	Dale Morgan	537	36.1	−13.1
Socialist People's Party	Jim Hamezeian	499	33.5	+2.7
Conservative	Tina Macur	265	17.8	−2.2
Independent	Margaret Arts	188	12.6	+12.6
Majority		38	2.6	−15.8
Turnout		1,489		

Parkside
Party	Candidate	Votes	%	±%
Labour	Susan Opie	632	36.3	+1.9
Liberal Democrats	Barry Rabone	559	32.1	+2.0
Conservative	Pamela Smith	548	31.5	+0.6
Majority		73	4.2	+0.7
Turnout		1,739		

Risedale
Party	Candidate	Votes	%	±%
Labour	Terence Waiting	699	51.2	−4.5
Conservative	Desmond English	277	20.3	−6.0
Socialist People's Party	Alexandre Dacre	244	17.9	+0.0
Independent	Helene Young	146	10.7	+10.7
Majority		422	30.9	+1.5
Turnout		1,366		

Roosecote
Party	Candidate	Votes	%	±%
Conservative	Ramon Guselli	1,177	61.7	+0.2
Labour	Stephen Smart	731	38.3	−0.2
Majority		446	23.4	+0.4
Turnout		1,908		

Walney North
Party	Candidate	Votes	%	±%
Labour	Anthony Callister	805	48.1	−18.8
Conservative	Ronald Hiseman	467	27.9	−5.2
Independent	Kenneth Arts	402	24.0	+24.0
Majority		338	20.2	−13.6
Turnout		1,674		

Walney South
Party	Candidate	Votes	%	±%
Labour	John Murphy	810	45.9	−6.3
Conservative	Graham Pritchard	658	37.3	−10.5
Independent	Margaret Taylor	295	16.7	+16.7
Majority		152	8.6	+4.2
Turnout		1,763		
