= 2003 Barrow-in-Furness Borough Council election =

2003 UK local government election

Results of the 2003 Barrow-in-Furness Borough Council election

Elections to Barrow-in-Furness Borough Council were held on 1 May 2003. One third of the council was up for election and the Labour party gained control of the council from no overall control.

After the election, the composition of the council was

- Labour 21
- Conservative 14
- Independent 3

== Election result ==
Barrow-in-Furness local election result 2003
Party	Seats	Gains	Losses	Net gain/loss	Seats %	Votes %	Votes	+/−
Labour	8			+2	61.5	41.6	5,215	-5.3%
Conservative	4			-1	30.8	42.1	5,278	+6.1%
Independent	1			0	7.7	6.8	854	+0.8%
Socialist People's Party	0			0	0	6.2	775	-4.0%
Liberal Democrats	0			0	0	2.6	330	+2.6%
UKIP	0			0	0	0.6	71	-0.3%

== Ward results ==
Barrow Island
Party	Candidate	Votes	%	±%
Independent	Eric Wood	349	69.7	+24.2
Labour	Stephen Smart	152	30.3	−11.4
Majority		197	39.4	+35.6
Turnout		501		

Central
Party	Candidate	Votes	%	±%
Labour	Bernard Flanagan	357	52.4	−12.3
Socialist People's Party	Patricia Humes	138	20.3	+20.3
Conservative	Kristina Bell	115	16.9	−1.4
UKIP	John Smith	71	10.4	−6.6
Majority		219	32.1	−14.3
Turnout		681		

Dalton North
Party	Candidate	Votes	%	±%
Labour	John Major	431	35.5	−9.5
Conservative	Lynn Murray	414	34.1	+5.3
Independent	Thomas Weall	368	30.3	+4.2
Majority		17	1.4	−14.8
Turnout		1,213		

Dalton South
Party	Candidate	Votes	%	±%
Conservative	Dorothy James	427	44.3	+5.5
Labour	Dennis Toye	341	35.4	+2.5
Independent	Ian Singleton	137	14.2	+0.0
Socialist People's Party	Dorothy Turner	58	6.0	−0.5
Majority		86	8.9	+3.0
Turnout		963		

Hawcoat
Party	Candidate	Votes	%	±%
Conservative	Jack Richardson	1,124	78.9	+9.4
Labour	Rebecca Melling	301	21.1	−1.0
Majority		823	57.8	+10.4
Turnout		1,425		

Hindpool
Party	Candidate	Votes	%	±%
Labour	Kenneth Burton	411	54.4	−6.0
Conservative	John Murray	178	23.5	+7.1
Socialist People's Party	Rosemarie Hamezeian	167	22.1	−1.1
Majority		233	30.9	−6.3
Turnout		756		

Newbarns
Party	Candidate	Votes	%	±%
Conservative	William Pears	777	65.4	+15.7
Labour	Thomas Elliot	331	27.9	−10.9
Socialist People's Party	William O'Brien	80	6.7	−4.8
Majority		446	37.5	+26.6
Turnout		1,188		

Ormsgill
Party	Candidate	Votes	%	±%
Labour	Stephen Forbes	451	49.2	+5.0
Socialist People's Party	Jim Hamezeian	282	30.8	−8.3
Conservative	Tina Macur	183	20.0	+3.3
Majority		169	18.4	+13.3
Turnout		916		

Parkside
Party	Candidate	Votes	%	±%
Labour	Stephen Groundwater	377	34.4	−22.0
Conservative	Shirley Richardson	339	30.9	−12.7
Liberal Democrats	Barry Rabone	330	30.1	+30.1
Socialist People's Party	Barbara Eager	50	4.6	+4.6
Majority		38	3.5	−9.3
Turnout		1,096		

Risedale
Party	Candidate	Votes	%	±%
Labour	Margaret Thomson	432	55.7	+1.7
Conservative	Desmond English	204	26.3	+8.1
Socialist People's Party	Alexandre Dacre	139	17.9	−9.9
Majority		228	29.4	+3.2
Turnout		775		

Roosecote
Party	Candidate	Votes	%	±%
Conservative	Rory McClure	712	61.5	+2.3
Labour	Maire Read	446	38.5	−2.3
Majority		266	23.0	+4.6
Turnout		1,158		

Walney North
Party	Candidate	Votes	%	±%
Labour	Desmond Barlow	662	66.9	+2.2
Conservative	Ronald Hiseman	327	33.1	+9.6
Majority		335	33.8	−7.4
Turnout		989		

Walney South
Party	Candidate	Votes	%	±%
Labour	David Jackson	523	52.2	−9.4
Conservative	Graham Pritchard	478	47.8	+9.4
Majority		45	4.4	−18.8
Turnout		1,001		
