= 2019 Barrow-in-Furness Borough Council election =

2019 UK local government election

- 2 May 2019

All 36 seats to Barrow-in-Furness Borough Council
	First party	Second party
Leader	Ann Thomson	Hazel Edwards
Party	Labour	Conservative
Seats won	24	12

The 2019 Barrow-in-Furness Borough Council election took place on 2 May 2019 to elect members of Barrow-in-Furness Borough Council in England. This was on the same day as other local elections.

The Labour Party held their control of the council, even though their majority decreased to 12.

== Results summary ==
2019 Barrow-in-Furness Borough Council Election
Party	Councillors				Votes		
Party		Of total	Net			Of total	Net
Labour Party	24	66.7%		24 / 36	18,030	50.9%	
Conservative Party	12	33.3%		12 / 36	14,357	40.5%	
UK Independence Party	0	0.0%		0 / 36	3,036	8.6%	

== Ward results ==
=== Barrow Island ===
Barrow Island
Party	Candidate	Votes	%	±%
Labour	Allison Johnson	223	54.5	−9.7
UKIP	Doug Walters	111	27.1	−8.7
Conservative	Brenda Lauderdale	75	18.3	N/A
Majority				
Turnout		410	25.0	
Rejected ballots		1		
Labour hold		Swing		

=== Central ===
Central
Party	Candidate	Votes	%	±%
Labour	Trevor Biggins	331	56.7	
Labour	Steve Robson	299	51.2	
UKIP	Anne McMeekin	141	24.1	
Conservative	Anne Bispham	139	23.8	N/A
Conservative	Emma Wylie	75	12.8	N/A
Majority				
Turnout		586	21.0	
Rejected ballots		2		
Labour hold		Swing		
Labour hold		Swing		

=== Dalton North ===
Dalton North
Party	Candidate	Votes	%	±%
Conservative	Ben Shirley	910	57.8	
Conservative	Sam Ronson	675	42.9	
Conservative	Daniel Edwards	639	40.6	
Labour	Mai Harrison	574	36.4	
Labour	Janice Benson	522	33.1	
Labour	Robert Elliot	452	28.7	
UKIP	Brian Litster	283	18.0	
Majority				
Turnout		1,584	32.4	
Rejected ballots		9		
Conservative hold		Swing		
Conservative gain from Labour		Swing		
Conservative gain from Labour		Swing		

=== Dalton South ===
Dalton South
Party	Candidate	Votes	%	±%
Labour	Wendy Maddox	565	43.2	
Labour	Shaun Blezard	563	43.0	
Labour	Steve Nott	524	40.1	
Conservative	Des English	510	39.0	
Conservative	Gordon Murray	506	38.7	
Conservative	Nick Perie	497	38.0	
UKIP	Dick Young	283	21.6	N/A
Majority				
Turnout		1,316	27.9	
Rejected ballots		8		
Labour hold		Swing		
Labour gain from Conservative		Swing		
Labour hold		Swing		

=== Hawcoat ===
Hawcoat
Party	Candidate	Votes	%	±%
Conservative	Hazel Edwards	852	59.1	
Conservative	Alan Pemberton	770	53.4	
Conservative	Roy Worthington	664	46.1	
Labour	Tricia Casey	393	27.3	
Labour	Lee McKenna	390	27.1	
Labour	Rachael Knott	341	23.7	
UKIP	Geoffrey Bowron	243	16.9	N/A
Majority				
Turnout		1,442	35.2	
Rejected ballots		1		
Conservative hold		Swing		
Conservative hold		Swing		
Conservative hold		Swing		

=== Hindpool ===
Hindpool
Party	Candidate	Votes	%	±%
Labour	Anne Burns	610	61.9	+61.9
Labour	Dave Pidduck	606	61.5	+61.5
Labour	Ann Thomson	570	57.8	+57.8
Conservative	Michael Conlin	207	21.0	N/A
UKIP	David Roberts	204	20.7	N/A
Conservative	Ann English	183	18.6	N/A
Conservative	Ged Nicholson	183	18.6	N/A
Majority				
Turnout		987	23.4	
Rejected ballots		1		
Labour hold		Swing		
Labour hold		Swing		
Labour hold		Swing		

=== Newbarns ===
Newbarns
Party	Candidate	Votes	%	±%
Conservative	Mark Burley	563	47.1	
Conservative	Wendy McClure	538	45.0	
Conservative	Les Hall	523	43.7	N/A
Labour	John Murphy	444	37.1	
Labour	Alec Proffitt	421	35.2	
Labour	Thommy McNaughton	404	33.8	
UKIP	Carol Sloan	233	19.5	N/A
Majority				
Turnout		1,207	27.0	
Rejected ballots		11		
Conservative hold		Swing		
Conservative gain from Labour		Swing		
Conservative gain from Labour		Swing		

=== Ormsgill ===
Ormsgill
Party	Candidate	Votes	%	±%
Labour	Bill McEwan	597	58.6	+58.6
Labour	Derek Brook	520	51.1	+51.1
Labour	Beverly Morgan	497	48.8	+48.8
UKIP	Theresa McMeekin	233	22.9	N/A
Conservative	Michelle Foster	216	21.2	N/A
Conservative	Terri Gibney	187	18.4	N/A
Conservative	Jill Heath	172	16.9	N/A
Majority				
Turnout		1,024	23.8	
Rejected ballots		6		
Labour hold		Swing		
Labour hold		Swing		
Labour hold		Swing		

=== Parkside ===
Parkside
Party	Candidate	Votes	%	±%
Labour	Terry Assouad	572	49.5	
Labour	Iain Mooney	560	48.5	
Labour	Lee Roberts	560	48.5	
Conservative	Louise Smith	380	32.9	
Conservative	Robin Jameson	368	31.9	
Conservative	Sol Wielkopolski	325	28.1	N/A
UKIP	Rick Currie	219	19.0	N/A
Majority				
Turnout		1,163	27.4	
Rejected ballots		8		
Labour hold		Swing		
Labour hold		Swing		
Labour hold		Swing		

=== Risedale ===
Risedale
Party	Candidate	Votes	%	±%
Labour	Kevin Hamilton	572	56.4	
Labour	Hayley Preston	570	56.2	
Labour	Debra Seward	511	50.4	
UKIP	Colin Rudd	286	28.2	
Conservative	Kerry Burns	230	22.7	N/A
Conservative	Hannah Bolam	221	21.8	N/A
Conservative	Gillian McLeavy	173	17.1	N/A
Majority				
Turnout		1,025	22.7	
Rejected ballots		11		
Labour hold		Swing		
Labour hold		Swing		
Labour hold		Swing		

=== Roosecote ===
Roosecote
Party	Candidate	Votes	%	±%
Conservative	Derek Gawne	614	49.6	
Conservative	Rory McClure	603	48.7	
Conservative	Martin McLeavy	548	44.3	
Labour	Fred Chatfield	450	36.4	
Labour	Andrew Mooney	404	32.7	
Labour	Steve Herbert	375	30.3	
UKIP	Patricia Bowron	279	22.6	N/A
Majority				
Turnout		1,249	32.2	
Rejected ballots		12		
Conservative hold		Swing		
Conservative hold		Swing		
Conservative hold		Swing		

=== Walney North ===
Walney North
Party	Candidate	Votes	%	±%
Labour	Des Barlow	619	54.7	
Labour	Anita Husband	607	53.6	
Labour	Tony Callister	585	51.7	
Conservative	Nicky Kyle	297	26.2	N/A
UKIP	Keith Pearson	248	21.9	
Conservative	Logan O'Brien	234	20.7	N/A
Conservative	Paul Rose	232	20.5	N/A
Majority				
Turnout		1,136	26.5	
Rejected ballots		4		
Labour hold		Swing		
Labour hold		Swing		
Labour hold		Swing		

=== Walney South ===
Walney South
Party	Candidate	Votes	%	±%
Labour	Frank Cassidy	621	53.2	
Labour	Colin Thomson	613	52.5	
Labour	Helen Wall	565	48.4	
Conservative	Josh McLeavy	354	30.3	
Conservative	Steve Jamieson	353	30.2	
Conservative	Lynda Shaw	341	29.2	N/A
UKIP	John Gidney	273	23.4	
Majority				
Turnout		1,179	28.8	
Rejected ballots		12		
Labour hold		Swing		
Labour hold		Swing		
Labour hold		Swing		

== Changes 2019–2023 ==
- 23 March 2022: Conservative councillors Hazel Edwards (Hawcoat), Wendy McClure (Newbarns) and Martin McLeavy (Roosecote), all elected in 2019, resigned from the Conservative Party and formed the Furness Independent group.
- 1 April 2023: Barrow-in-Furness Borough Council was abolished and its functions transferred to Westmorland and Furness Council.

=== By-elections ===
==== Hindpool ====
Hindpool, 6 May 2021
Party	Candidate	Votes	%	±%
Labour	Joanne Tyson	600		
Conservative	Niyall Phillips	359		
Rejected ballots		5		
Majority		241		
Turnout		964		
Labour hold		Swing		

The by-election followed the resignation of Labour councillor Dave Pidduck, who had been elected in 2019 to one of the three seats representing Hindpool ward.

==== Roosecote ====
Roosecote, 6 May 2021
Party	Candidate	Votes	%	±%
Conservative	Jay Zaccarini	881		
Labour	Paul Griffiths	564		
Rejected ballots		10		
Majority		317		
Turnout		1455		
Conservative hold		Swing		

The by-election followed the death of Conservative councillor Rory McClure, who had been elected in 2019 to one of the three seats representing Roosecote ward.
