= Iain Wood (sporting director) =

English football director

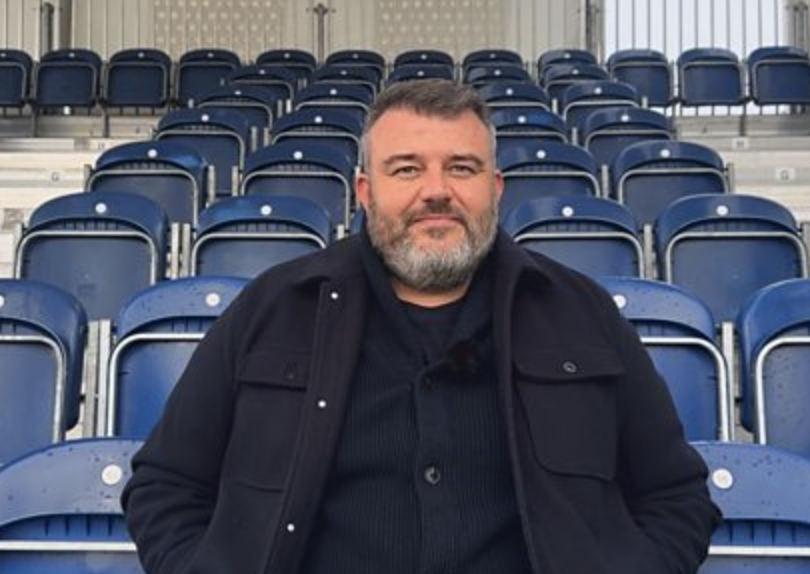

Personal information
- Full name: Iain Wood
- Place of birth: Brighton, England

Iain Wood is an English football director. Wood previously was Chief Executive Officer of League Two club Barrow, which ended in Barrow's relegation from the EFL. He has previously worked as a football agent, representing several high-profile players and managers.

== Football agent career ==
Wood worked as a football agent for approximately 15 years, including a period with New Era Global Sports, before establishing his own agency. working with players and managers across the Premier League, English Football League and National League.

In January 2014, while representing Chris Wilder, Wood issued a statement denying reports that his client had resigned as manager of Oxford United amid speculation linking him with Northampton Town. Oxford subsequently accepted Wilder's resignation, and he was appointed Northampton manager on 27 January 2014.

Wood continued to represent Wilder during his time at Northampton, including his move to Sheffield United in May 2016. Wood confirmed that several clubs had expressed interest in Wilder, but said that the opportunity to manage his boyhood club had been decisive in his decision to join Sheffield United.

== Football executive career ==
In May 2022, Wood was appointed sporting director of Barrow, assuming responsibility for the club's football operations in collaboration with the first-team manager. His remit included player recruitment and retention, player development, training facilities, medical and support staff, and performance analysis.

Later that month, Wood oversaw the appointment of Pete Wild as first-team manager following his departure from FC Halifax Town. Wood subsequently revealed that Wild had been his first choice for the position, having identified him as a suitable candidate shortly after joining the club. During the summer of 2022, Wood and Wild oversaw a substantial restructuring of the playing squad, with 14 departures and 13 arrivals. Barrow subsequently finished ninth in EFL League Two in the 2022–23 season and eighth in 2023–24, narrowly missing out on the play-offs by one point.

In April 2023, Wood announced plans to establish a B team at Barrow, intended to provide a development pathway for younger players and opportunities to progress into the first-team squad. The team was introduced ahead of the 2023–24 season, with several young players subsequently becoming involved in first-team activities. In May 2023, Wood also oversaw the relocation of Barrow's training operations to Broadhurst Park, the home of F.C. United of Manchester in Moston, Manchester. The arrangement was intended to improve training facilities and support the club's player recruitment and development operations.

Following Wild's departure by mutual agreement in May 2024, Barrow announced that the remaining management team would report directly to Wood, who would oversee the recruitment of a new head coach. This arrangement placed Wood above the first-team head coach within the club's football management structure. On 31 May 2024, Stephen Clemence was appointed head coach on a two-year contract, replacing Wild. Wood subsequently defended the appointment, describing Clemence as the right choice for the club.

On 12 October 2024, Wood was promoted to chief executive officer of Barrow, retaining his responsibilities as sporting director while assuming oversight of the club's non-playing operations. He also joined the club's board of directors, bringing both football and administrative operations under his executive leadership. Club chairman Paul Hornby described the promotion as a natural progression for Wood and the club.

Following Clemence's dismissal in January 2025, Barrow appointed Andy Whing as head coach from Solihull Moors. Whing led the club to a 16th-place finish in League Two but was dismissed in December 2025, with Barrow 18th in the table. On 2 January 2026, Paul Gallagher was appointed head coach, with Wood publicly supporting the appointment as significant to the club's short- and long-term plans. Gallagher was dismissed after losing all five of his matches in charge, and was succeeded by Dino Maamria.

On 2 May 2026, Barrow were relegated from League Two following a 2–1 defeat to Newport County, ending their six-year stay in the English Football League. The club finished bottom of the division, having employed five different permanent or interim first-team managers during the 2025–26 season.

On 4 May 2026, Wood departed Barrow, having overseen the club's decline from an eighth-place finish in League Two in 2023–24 to relegation to the National League in 2025–26.
