= Willie Brown (footballer, born 1922) =

Scottish footballer and manager

Personal information
- Full name: William Falconer Brown
- Date of birth: 20 October 1922
- Place of birth: Larkhall, Scotland
- Date of death: 27 May 1978 (aged 55)
- Place of death: Ronaldsay, Orkney, Scotland
- Position: Right back

Youth career
- Larkhall Thistle

Senior career*
Years	Team	Apps	(Gls)
1946–1950	Preston North End	40	(1)
1950	Queen of the South	8	(0)
1950–1951	Elgin City		
1951–1958	Grimsby Town	265	(1)
Total		313	(2)

Managerial career
- 1958–1959: Barrow
- * Club domestic league appearances and goals

William Falconer Brown (20 October 1922 – 27 May 1978) was a Scottish football player and manager. He played for Preston North End, Queen of the South, Elgin City and Grimsby Town, then managed Barrow from July 1958 to August 1959.
