= 2007 Barrow-in-Furness Borough Council election =

2007 UK local government election

Results of the 2007 Barrow-in-Furness Borough Council election

Elections to Barrow-in-Furness Borough Council were held on 3 May 2007. One third of the council was up for election and the council stayed under no overall control.

After the election, the composition of the council was

- Conservative 19
- Labour 16
- Independent 2
- People's Party 1

== Election result ==
Barrow-in-Furness local election result 2007
Party	Seats	Gains	Losses	Net gain/loss	Seats %	Votes %	Votes	+/−
Conservative	7	2	0	+2	53.8	46.1	6,819	-6.1%
Labour	5	0	2	-2	38.5	38.1	5,639	+4.3%
Independent	1	0	0	0	7.7	9.9	1,457	+1.1%
Socialist People's Party	0	0	0	0	0	5.2	774	+0.0%
BNP	0	0	0	0	0	0.7	100	+0.7%

== Ward results ==
Barrow Island
Party	Candidate	Votes	%	±%
Independent	Eric Wood	391	77.7	+8.5
Labour	Robert Pointer	112	22.3	−8.5
Majority		279	55.4	+17.0
Turnout		503		
Independent hold		Swing		

Central
Party	Candidate	Votes	%	±%
Labour	Margaret Thomson	402	41.4	+2.4
Socialist People's Party	Rosemary Hamezeian	265	27.3	−7.6
Conservative	Lucy Pearson	205	21.1	−5.0
BNP	Michael Ashburner	100	10.3	+10.3
Majority		137	14.1	+10.0
Turnout		972		
Labour hold		Swing		

Dalton North
Party	Candidate	Votes	%	±%
Conservative	Jill Heath	798	58.9	+6.6
Labour	John Major	556	41.1	−6.6
Majority		242	17.8	+13.2
Turnout		1,354		
Conservative gain from Labour		Swing		

Dalton South
Party	Candidate	Votes	%	±%
Conservative	Dorothy James	532	39.0	−11.3
Independent	John Millar	455	33.4	+33.4
Labour	Dermot O'Connor	377	27.6	−22.1
Majority		77	5.6	+5.0
Turnout		1,364		
Conservative hold		Swing		

Hawcoat
Party	Candidate	Votes	%	±%
Conservative	Jack Richardson	1,159	77.4	−10.8
Labour	Marie Derbyshire	339	22.6	+10.8
Majority		820	54.8	−21.6
Turnout		1,498		
Conservative hold		Swing		

Hindpool
Party	Candidate	Votes	%	±%
Labour	Michelle Roberts	469	54.9	−3.0
Conservative	John Murray	219	25.6	−16.5
Independent	Gillian Nicholson	166	19.4	+19.4
Majority		250	29.3	+13.5
Turnout		854		
Labour hold		Swing		

Newbarns
Party	Candidate	Votes	%	±%
Conservative	Dorothy Dawes	778	66.0	
Labour	Tricia Kegg	400	34.0	
Majority		378	32.0	
Turnout		1,178		
Conservative hold		Swing		

Ormsgill
Party	Candidate	Votes	%	±%
Labour	Stephen Forbes	418	38.7	+13.8
Socialist People's Party	Sheila Begley	302	27.9	−11.9
Conservative	Samuel Pearson	195	18.0	−6.0
Independent	Margie Arts	166	15.4	+4.0
Majority		116	10.8	
Turnout		1,081		
Labour hold		Swing		

Parkside
Party	Candidate	Votes	%	±%
Conservative	Tina Macur	583	52.1	−17.2
Labour	Stephen Groundwater	536	47.9	+17.2
Majority		47	4.2	−34.4
Turnout		1,119		
Conservative gain from Labour		Swing		

Risedale
Party	Candidate	Votes	%	±%
Labour	Jean Waiting	473	45.2	+6.0
Conservative	Brenda Lauderdale	367	35.1	−5.1
Socialist People's Party	Sarah Martinez	207	19.8	−0.8
Majority		106	10.1	
Turnout		1,047		
Labour hold		Swing		

Roosecote
Party	Candidate	Votes	%	±%
Conservative	Rory McClure	987	69.5	−1.2
Labour	Colin Thomson	434	30.5	+1.2
Majority		553	39.0	−2.4
Turnout		1,421		
Conservative hold		Swing		

Walney North
Party	Candidate	Votes	%	±%
Labour	Desmond Barlow	598	46.9	+11.7
Conservative	Susannah Pearson	397	31.2	−2.3
Independent	Stephen Smart	279	21.9	−9.4
Majority		201	15.7	+14.0
Turnout		1,274		
Labour hold		Swing		

Walney South
Party	Candidate	Votes	%	±%
Conservative	Oliver Pearson	599	53.3	
Labour	Kenneth Beeres	525	46.7	
Majority		74	6.6	
Turnout		1,124		
Conservative hold		Swing		
