= Little Park, Roose =

Sports venue in Barrow-in-Furness, England

Little Park
- Location: Yarlside Road, Barrow-in-Furness
- Coordinates: 54°07′04″N 3°11′30″W
- Opened: circa.1880s
- Closed: circa.1935

Little Park was a multiple sports venue on Yarlside Road, Barrow-in-Furness, from the late 1880s until the late 1930s. It hosted rugby league, football, greyhound racing, speedway and athletics.

== Opening ==
Although the first mention of the name Little Park is in 1891 it is apparent that a home ground referred to as the home ground of Roose rugby football is possible or even likely to have been the same venue.

== Rugby league ==
St George's Rugby Football team played at the ground in 1891.

In 1914 Barrow Raiders decided to move to Little Park from Cavendish Park. In 1920, the club bought Little Park from Lord Richard Cavendish for £3,000 and in the following years put up two grandstands in 1921 and 1924. A record crowd of 12,214 was recorded against Oldham RLFC in a Challenge Cup game on 17 March 1923. In 1931, the club moved to Craven Park.

While the ground was up for sale in 1935 it continued to host amateur matches.

== Athletics ==
Various athletics events were held at the ground during the late 19th Century and early 20th Century, including professional events. One such event was recorded in 1895, when a professional foot race took place in July.

== Association football ==
Roose FC of the Barrow and District League and Pulp Works FC of the North-Western Association League played at the ground as early as 1891.

Barrow A.F.C. moved to Little Park in March 1905, a year which saw the club enjoy their first success, winning promotion to Division One of the Lancashire Combination in 1908. The following year in 1909, the Club moves to Holker Street.

== Speedway ==
Barrow Bombers moved to Little Park during 1931 but crowd levels were insufficient for the promotion to remain at the venue and speedway ended in Barrow for 42 years after the 24 August meeting.

== Greyhound racing ==
Independent (unaffiliated to a governing body) greyhound racing briefly took place at the Little Park during 1931.

== Closure ==
The venue was put up for sale by Barrow Rugby in 1935 and offered to the Corporation but eventually it was purchased by developers. It was later demolished but remained undeveloped until 1957. Housing was built on the site and the site today would be located directly on the north side of the Ship Inn.

== See also ==
- Barrow Raiders
- Barrow Bombers
- Barrow A.F.C.
