= 2011 Barrow-in-Furness Borough Council election =

2011 UK local government election

Map of the results of the 2011 Barrow-in-Furness council election. Labour in red and Conservative in blue.

The 2011 Barrow-in-Furness Borough Council election took place on 5 May 2011 to elect members of Barrow-in-Furness Borough Council in Cumbria, England. The whole council was up for election and the Labour Party gained overall control of the council from no overall control.

== Campaign ==
Before the election no party had a majority on the council and Conservative Jack Richardson was the leader of the council with support from the independents. The whole council was being elected for a four-year term for the first time, changing from the previous system of election by thirds. Nine sitting councillors stood down at the election.

Issues in the campaign included dog fouling, potholes, jobs and keeping the environment clean.

== Election result ==
The results saw Labour gain 13 seats to take control over the council with 29 seats. The Conservatives were reduced to 7 seats and only managed to hold all of the seats in the 2 wards of Hawcoat and Roosecote. Overall turnout in the election was 36.28%.

Both the Conservative leader of the council Jack Richardson and the Labour member of parliament for Barrow and Furness John Woodcock put the results down to the cuts the national, Conservative led, government were making.

Barrow-in-Furness local election result 2011
Party	Seats	Gains	Losses	Net gain/loss	Seats %	Votes %	Votes	+/−
Labour	29	13	0	+13	80.6	55.7	25,839	+0.6%
Conservative	7	1	7	-6	19.4	37.3	17,295	0.0%
Socialist People's Party	0	0	2	-2	0	3.3	1,553	-0.9%
Independent	0	0	5	-5	0	2.8	1,320	+1.2%
UKIP	0	0	0	0	0	0.8	369	+0.8%

== Ward results ==
Barrow Island
Party	Candidate	Votes	%	±%
Labour	Allison Johnston	380	56.4	+37.3
Independent	Eric Wood	294	43.6	−37.3
Majority		86	12.8	
Turnout		674	37.9	
Labour gain from Independent		Swing		

Central (2)
Party	Candidate	Votes	%	±%
Labour	Trevor Biggins	446		
Labour	Mary Irwin	403		
Conservative	Susan Reader	134		
Independent	Oliver Pearson	108		
Socialist People's Party	Rosemarie Hamezeian	102		
Socialist People's Party	Kristie Hall	62		
Turnout		1,255	25.1	
Labour hold		Swing		
Labour hold		Swing		

Dalton North (3)
Party	Candidate	Votes	%	±%
Labour	Denis Bell	976		
Labour	Barry Doughty	943		
Labour	Ann Thurlow	866		
Conservative	Jill Heath	812		
Conservative	Katherine Unwin	734		
Conservative	Cheryl Wadeson	617		
Turnout		4,948	38.3	
Labour gain from Conservative		Swing		
Labour hold		Swing		
Labour gain from Conservative		Swing		

Dalton South (3)
Party	Candidate	Votes	%	±%
Labour	Wendy Maddox	921		
Labour	Frank Murray	879		
Labour	Ernest Wilson	748		
Conservative	John Millar	650		
Conservative	Bill Bleasdale	557		
Conservative	Martin McLeavy	532		
Independent	Timothy Bell	314		
UKIP	Ian Jackson	210		
Turnout		4,811	38.0	
Labour hold		Swing		
Labour gain from Independent		Swing		
Labour gain from Conservative		Swing		

Hawcoat (3)
Party	Candidate	Votes	%	±%
Conservative	David Roberts	1,052		
Conservative	Jack Richardson	1,051		
Conservative	Alan Pemberton	1,000		
Labour	Rebecca Melling	611		
Turnout		3,714	46.4	
Conservative hold		Swing		
Conservative hold		Swing		
Conservative gain from Independent		Swing		

Hindpool (3)
Party	Candidate	Votes	%	±%
Labour	Anne Burns	824		
Labour	David Pidduck	823		
Labour	Ann Thomson	715		
Conservative	Mark Burley	276		
Socialist People's Party	Sarah Pllana	151		
Socialist People's Party	Lee Wicks	145		
Turnout		2,934	28.7	
Labour hold		Swing		
Labour hold		Swing		
Labour hold		Swing		

Newbarns (3)
Party	Candidate	Votes	%	±%
Labour	John Murphy	733		
Labour	Marie Derbyshire	719		
Conservative	Wendy McClure	715		
Labour	Lorraine Biggins	697		
Conservative	David Salt	690		
Conservative	Tina Macur	664		
Turnout		4,218	37.1	
Labour hold		Swing		
Labour gain from Conservative		Swing		
Conservative hold		Swing		

Ormsgill (3)
Party	Candidate	Votes	%	±%
Labour	Lee McKenna	707		
Labour	Robert Pointer	688		
Labour	Hayley Preston	612		
Socialist People's Party	Jim Hamezeian	501		
Socialist People's Party	William McEwan	344		
Socialist People's Party	Helen Robinson	248		
Conservative	Terri-Ann Gibney	234		
Conservative	Cheryl Fisher	232		
Conservative	Rowen McClure	216		
Turnout		3,782	32.9	
Labour gain from Socialist People's Party		Swing		
Labour hold		Swing		
Labour gain from Socialist People's Party		Swing		

Parkside (3)
Party	Candidate	Votes	%	±%
Labour	Susan Opie	863		
Labour	Debra Seward	857		
Labour	Brendan Sweeney	787		
Conservative	Linda Last	503		
Conservative	Shirley Richardson	444		
Conservative	Joshua White	414		
Independent	Lisa Hammond	235		
Turnout		4,103	37.1	
Labour gain from Independent		Swing		
Labour gain from Independent		Swing		
Labour hold		Swing		

Risedale (3)
Party	Candidate	Votes	%	±%
Labour	Kevin Hamilton	827		
Labour	Lesley Graham	820		
Labour	Jeffrey Garnett	812		
Conservative	Elaine Burley	326		
Conservative	Ann English	269		
Conservative	Des English	263		
UKIP	Noel Matthews	159		
Turnout		3,476	29.0	
Labour gain from Conservative		Swing		
Labour hold		Swing		
Labour hold		Swing		

Roosecote (3)
Party	Candidate	Votes	%	±%
Conservative	Ray Guselli	942		
Conservative	Rory McClure	814		
Conservative	Ken Williams	776		
Labour	Kenneth Thomson	622		
Labour	Mark Semple	602		
Turnout		3,756	43.6	
Conservative hold		Swing		
Conservative hold		Swing		
Conservative hold		Swing		

Walney North (3)
Party	Candidate	Votes	%	±%
Labour	Des Barlow	1,130		
Labour	Anita Husband	1,076		
Labour	Tony Callister	1,016		
Conservative	Craig Fisher	350		
Conservative	Cameron McClure	325		
Conservative	Jamie Wiggins	287		
Turnout		4,184	37.7	
Labour hold		Swing		
Labour hold		Swing		
Labour hold		Swing		

Walney South (3)
Party	Candidate	Votes	%	±%
Labour	Colin Thomson	966		
Labour	Frank Cassidy	914		
Labour	Helen Wall	856		
Conservative	David Marcus	583		
Conservative	Derek Gawne	422		
Conservative	Lorraine Cook	411		
Turnout		4,152	38.9	
Labour hold		Swing		
Labour gain from Conservative		Swing		
Labour gain from Conservative		Swing		
