= Holker Street =

English sports venue in Cumbria

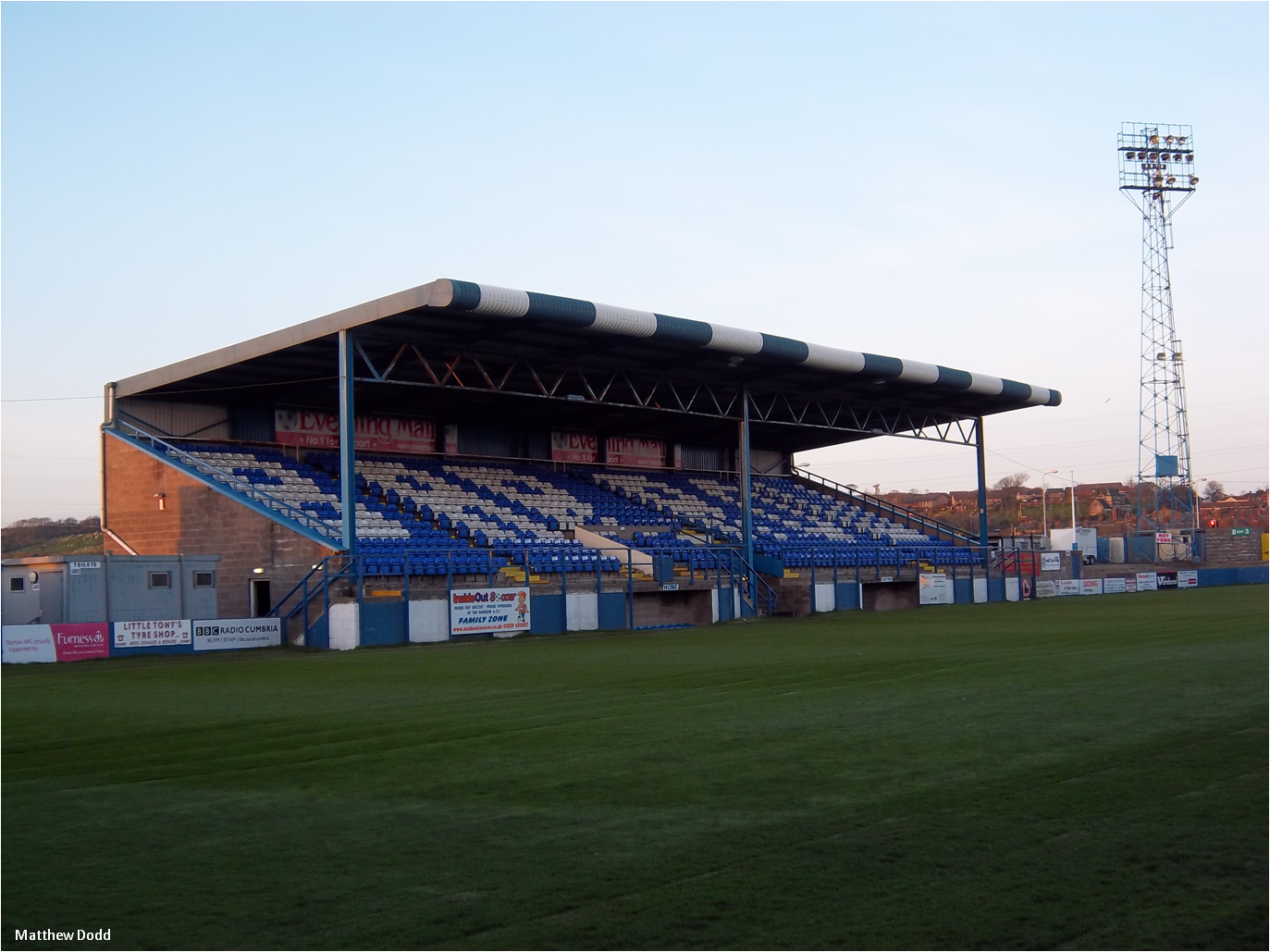
- Interactive map of Holker Street
- Location: Barrow-in-Furness, Cumbria, England
- Coordinates: 54°7′24″N 3°14′6″W
- Owner: Barrow A.F.C.
- Capacity: 6,500 (2,249 seated)
- Surface: Grass
- Record attendance: 16,874 v Swansea Town (FA Cup third round, 9 January 1954)

Construction
- Opened: c.1909; 117 years ago

Tenants
- Barrow A.F.C. Barrow Bombers speedway (former)

Holker Street is a sports stadium in Barrow-in-Furness, Cumbria, England. As well as being a football ground, it has also been used for motorcycle speedway. It once had some leisure centre facilities, including four squash courts, which have now been demolished. Its owners, and tenants for the majority of its history, are Barrow A.F.C., who have played at the ground since 1909. Despite its current capacity being just over 6,000, some 16,874 crammed the stadium in 1954 when Barrow played Swansea Town in the FA Cup third round.

== History ==
=== Early years ===
The site of Holker Street had previously been owned by the Furness Railway, which had used it as a rubbish tip. It was converted into a football pitch by Hindpool Athletic football club, though no stands had been built and the pitch had little grass — indeed, pieces of refuse on the site remained an obstacle for many years after the ground had been developed. Barrow, which had been founded in 1901, and had spent eight seasons playing at a variety of grounds in Barrow, moved there and took a five-year rent from Furness Railway in 1909. The first game played by Barrow at the ground was a Lancashire Combination league match against Eccles Borough, which finished in a 5–2 victory for Barrow.

The first structure built at the ground was a wooden all-seater stand in 1912. By 1921, when Barrow were elected into the new Third Division (North) of the Football League, Holker Street had been developed into an "excellent ground" with fully covered terracing surrounding the three remaining sides, changing rooms and turnstiles. The first match at the new level was against Stockport County, with an attendance of 9,750.

=== Football League period ===
Holker Street remained a good-quality ground during the 1930s, with further upgrades following the Second World War, which saw the wooden stand replaced by terracing. Post-war attendances were the highest in the ground's history, with at least one match a year attracting over 10,000 fans in the first ten seasons after the resumption of the football league in 1946. The highest attendance at Holker Street was recorded in 1954 when 16,874 fans saw Barrow draw 2–2 with Swansea Town in the third round of the FA Cup. Attendances dropped to an average of between five and six thousand through the 1950s and 1960s, though, to date, the last attendance of over 10,000 occurred in 1968, when 16,650 was the sell-out attendance for Barrow's FA Cup match against Leicester City.

Floodlights were erected around the ground in 1963, but the next major changes to occur were in 1972. With Barrow relegated from the Football League Third Division into the Fourth Division, the club was struggling financially and the decision was made to create a speedway track around the edge of the football pitch, resurrecting a sport that had briefly been hosted at Holker Street in 1930. Construction of that facility involved the demolition of the 'Steelworks End' of the ground and the removal of the front rows of the other terraces. Matches had to be played with grass on top of boards which covered the speedway track, resulting in complaints from other teams. Problems such as that were influential in the decision of the Football League clubs' to vote against Barrow when the team had to seek re-election to the league following a bottom-four finish in the Fourth Division at the end of the 1971–1972 season, and Barrow were demoted to the Northern Premier League. As it was, the speedway team which operated from Holker Street, the "Barrow Bombers", did so only for two years from 1972 till 1974, when the track was removed due to its unpopularity with other football clubs.

=== non-League era ===
Following demotion and the speedway era, Holker Street had become rather dilapidated. The remaining stands were demolished for health and safety concerns, though a cover was retained for the "Popular Side", and terracing was pushed closer to the pitch following the removal of the speedway track. The CrossBar leisure club and bar was subsequently built at the former Steelworks End, as part of a job creation scheme. That remains a dominant feature of the ground and is now the match day hospitality suite, as well as a conference centre. The other major development since the 1970s has been the construction of an all seater "Main Stand" on the Wilkie Road side of the ground. That was built during the period when the club was owned by Stephen Vaughan, and was opened in 1998.

Shortly after that, however, Holker Street became a key part of Barrow's financial problems. During the writing of gangster Curtis Warren's autobiography, Warren claimed to a journalist that he owned Holker Street. That claim led to a police investigation into Vaughan's activities, with the suspicion that he had been involved in money laundering for Warren. Vaughan was later cleared of all charges, but withdrew his financial backing from Barrow during the course of the investigation. That sent Barrow into administration, during which conflicts over the ownership of Holker Street were central. Vaughan had bought Holker Street from Barrow, transferring ownership to his company Northern Improvements. Vaughan paid Barrow £110,000 directly for the ground, claiming that the full value of £410,000 was made up by the £300,000 investment that he had made into the club whilst chairman. Following a long legal battle, lasting from 1998 to 2002, the transaction was eventually deemed improper and the newly formed Barrow ownership were able to regain ownership of the ground.

== Stadium ==
Holker Street has remained unchanged since the redevelopment of the main stand in the mid-1990s. Described as having "a traditional, old fashioned feel", the ground has three sides of terracing and one all-seater Main Stand, the latter with a capacity of around 1,000. The Main Stand, backing onto Wilkie Road is raised above the central portion of the pitch, with flat standing on either side. The Popular Side now has the only covered terracing, opposite the Main Stand. This end is dominated by the CrossBar which houses the club's offices, and which somewhat damages the aesthetics of the ground. Between 1963 and 2017, the ground had large floodlighting structures in its four corners. Three of those were replaced by smaller floodlights; one was kept because it also functions as a mobile phone mast.

The stadium also has basic catering facilities on match days.

The roof of the Main Stand suffered minor damage on 16 October 2017, as a result of Hurricane Ophelia. In 2020, a roof was built on the Holker Street End of the ground after the club had won promotion back to the Football League.

On 19 July 2022, it was announced that Holker Street would be renamed to the SO Legal Stadium following an agreement with SO Legal Ltd. The deal ran until the end of the 2023/24 season.

On May 12 2023, the club announced the renovation of two new temporary stands, made from scaffolding and sheeting, to be erected into the Wilkie Road side of the stadium accommodating both home and away supporters. Some 923 seats were added (371 for home supporters and 552 for away supporters) as well as the instalment of 196 seats into the Steelworks End of the ground.

== See also ==
- Barrow Bombers
