= Barrow A.F.C. =

Association football club in Barrow-in-Furness, England

Barrow
- Full name: Barrow Association Football Club
- Nickname: The Bluebirds
- Founded: 1901; 125 years ago
- Ground: Holker Street
- Capacity: 6,306 (2,249 seated)
- Chairman: Paul Hornby
- Manager: Adam Murray
- League: National League
- 2025–26: EFL League Two, 24th of 24 (relegated)
- Website: barrowafc.com
Home colours	Away colours	Third colours

Barrow Association Football Club is a professional football club based in Barrow-in-Furness, Cumbria, England. The club competes in the National League in the 2026–27 season, following relegation from EFL League Two.

Having initially played in the Lancashire Combination, Barrow joined the Football League in 1921. They remained in the bottom level of the competition until 1967, when they achieved promotion to the Third Division by finishing third in the Fourth Division. The club's highest league placing was in 1967–68, when they finished eighth in the Third Division. They declined quickly, however, and at the end of the 1971–72 season Barrow were voted out of the Football League in the re-election process. They then spent 48 seasons in the top two levels of non-League football, with five relegations from—and promotions to—the Alliance Premier League (later the Football Conference and the National League), of which they were a founding member in 1979. Barrow won the FA Trophy (non-League football's most prestigious cup competition) in 1990 and 2010. They returned to the Football League as National League champions in 2020. Barrow's promotion return to the Football League made them the first, and to date only, club to have been automatically promoted to the Football League having previously lost their league place via the re-election process, although a number of clubs had previously lost and regained their league status via re-election.

The club colours are blue and white and their nickname is The Bluebirds. Since 1909, Barrow have played their home games at Holker Street near the town centre, 0.7 miles (1.1 km) from Barrow-in-Furness railway station. The record attendance at Holker Street is 16,874, for a FA Cup third round fixture against Swansea Town in 1954.

== History ==
=== Early history ===
Barrow were founded on 16 July 1901 at the old Drill Hall (later the Palais) in the Strand, and played initially at the Strawberry Ground before moving to Ainslie Street and Little Park in Roose. The club was elected to Division Two of the Lancashire Combination in 1903, and in 1908 it was promoted to the first division. Barrow moved to Holker Street the following year, where they still play. The club remained in the Lancashire Combination until (and after) the First World War, winning the league championship in 1920–21. The victory preceded the formation of the Football League Third Division North in the 1921–22 season, and Barrow became one of the league's founding members.

=== Football League years ===
In their early years as a league club, Barrow were notable for their lack of success. Their highest finish before the Second World War was fifth in the 1931–32 season. In the 1933–34 season, Barrow finished eighth. The club remained in the lowest tier of the Football League when football resumed after the war, and were founding members of Football League Division Four in 1958–59. The 1950s saw greater success in FA Cup competition, however; the club's record crowd of 16,874 watched Barrow draw 2–2 with Swansea Town in the 1953–54 FA Cup. A few years later, it was followed by a third-round tie in the 1958–59 competition against Football League champions Wolverhampton Wanderers at Holker Street. The Wolves, captained by Billy Wright, won 4–2.

The late 1960s finally saw Barrow win promotion, after a third-place finish managed by Don McEvoy in the 1966–67 Fourth Division. McEvoy's successor, Colin Appleton, led Barrow to their highest final league position (eighth place) in the Football League Third Division the following season. The club topped the Third Division league table for one day during the 1968–69 season, the highest position they have ever held. During this period, defender Brian Arrowsmith made the most Football League appearances for Barrow. Barrow remained in the third flight of English football for three seasons, before returning to the basement in 1970. Financial difficulties and poor performances saw Barrow twice up for re-election in 1971 and 1972. On the second occasion, at the end of the 1971–72 season, they were voted out of the Football League and replaced by Hereford United. The initial vote produced saw a tie between Barrow and Hereford for the last place in the league, with each receiving 26 votes. However a second vote saw Hereford win with 29 votes to Barrow's 20. Three factors were highlighted: Barrow's geographic isolation, Hereford United's FA Cup victory against Newcastle United, and the decision of the Barrow board to introduce a speedway track around the Holker Street pitch to offset financial difficulties. Barrow joined the Northern Premier League for the start of the 1972–73 season, and the club spent 51 years in the Football League, 44 playing seasons due to the wartime closedown.

=== Return to non-League competition ===
Barrow's league position since their election to Division Three (North) in 1922

To gain access to the Northern Premier League, the club had to promise to remove the speedway track from Holker Street (although it remained until 1974). Barrow struggled in the league, with limited financial resources. The club were invited to join the new Alliance Premier League in 1979, the first national division in non-League football. Barrow won the Lancashire FA Challenge Trophy in 1981 (their first success as a non-League club since winning the Lancashire Combination in 1921), but were relegated two years later. They won the Northern Premier League title the following season under manager Vic Halom, but were relegated again by 1986. The club hired Ray Wilkie as a manager just before relegation, and Wilkie led Barrow to their most successful period to date in non-League football.

After a number of near-misses, the club did promote to the renamed Football Conference in 1988–89 after their Northern Premier League championship. Driven by Colin Cowperthwaite, holder of club records for appearances and goals, Barrow had two respectable finishes in the Conference: 10th in 1989–90 and 14th the following season. In addition to league success, Wilkie had a number of successful cup runs. Barrow reached the 1988 FA Trophy semi-final, losing to Enfield after two replays: the first at Aggborough, Kidderminster and the second at Marston Road, Stafford. The first leg, at Holker Street, attracted 6,002 supporters (a club non-League record). Enfield won the first leg 2–1, and Barrow won the second 1–0. Enfield went on to win the trophy against Telford United in a replay at the Hawthorns in West Bromwich after a goalless draw in the final at Wembley. Barrow reached the first round of the FA Cup the following season, losing 3–1 to Rotherham United.

They won the 1990 FA Trophy, their first major trophy as a non-League club, defeating Leek Town in the final at Wembley. Kenny Gordon, not ordinarily a goal-scorer, scored the first and third goals in his final game for his hometown club before emigrating to Australia. Other notable members of the squad included Kenny Lowe, who was sold to Barnet for £40,000 (a club record at the time) after the final. The following season (benefiting from direct entry to the first round), Barrow made the third round of the FA Cup for the first time as a non-League club before losing 1–0 away to Third Division high-fliers Bolton Wanderers.

Wilkie was forced to step down during the 1991–92 season due to health problems. Barrow were returned through relegation to the Northern Premier League and Cowperthwaite retired after fifteen seasons with the club, 704 appearances and 282 goals. Wilkie died in December 1992 at age 56, and the road outside the Holker Street ground was later named Wilkie Road in his honour.

=== 1990s turmoil ===
After Wilkie's departure and Barrow's relegation, the club had three mediocre seasons in the Northern Premier League. In February 1995, Barrow were purchased by boxing promoter and businessman Stephen Vaughan. Vaughan invested in the club, building an all-seater grandstand and signing Conference-standard players. The Bluebirds were promoted to the Conference in 1997–98 under manager Owen Brown.

Vaughan (who had connections with Liverpool drug-dealer Curtis Warren) was investigated for money laundering, although no charges were brought. He left the club at the end of 1998, withdrawing the financial support which had kept it afloat. It was learned that the Holker Street ground (Barrow's main asset) had been sold for £410,000 to Northern Improvements, a company in which Vaughan had a financial interest. In January 1999, the club were the subject of a compulsory winding-up order and a liquidator was appointed to run it while efforts were made to establish the ground's legal owner. A members' company was formed to provide financial support for the club, with the long-term intention of taking it over.

Although Barrow avoided relegation in the summer of 1999, they were expelled from the Football Conference for improper administration. With support from the Football Association after a long dispute, the club were admitted to the Northern Premier League for the 1999–2000 season almost a month after the season had begun. Barrow survived in the league under manager Kenny Lowe, despite an almost-entirely-new squad. The team improved over the next few years, remaining in administration. They narrowly missed promotion to the Conference twice, finishing second and third in 2003–04 and 2004–05. The legal disputes over the ownership of Holker Street were resolved in August 2002, and the members' company bought the stadium from the liquidator. In 2003, the Football Association allowed Barrow's "football membership" to be transferred to the new company.

The club defeated local rivals Workington in a two-legged April 2004 final in the UniBond Presidents (League) Cup. The game finished 6–6 on aggregate, with Barrow winning on away goals. After their failure to gain promotion to the Conference in 2004–05, Barrow became founding members of another division: the Conference North, which replaced the Northern Premier League one level below the Conference National.

=== National League years ===
The club had poor form over the following two seasons, narrowly escaping relegation at the end of 2006–07. Manager Lee Turnbull, who succeeded Lowe when Lowe had work commitments, was sacked in 2005 and replaced by Phil Wilson. Defender James Cotterill was jailed for an assault committed on the pitch. In a first round FA Cup game, Cotterill punched Bristol Rovers striker Sean Rigg. The incident was missed by the referee but was caught by the Match of the Day cameras, and Cotterill was the only English player in recent history to be jailed for an offence on the pitch.

After two years as manager, Wilson was dismissed on 12 November 2007. Although the sacking came two days after a good 1–1 draw in the FA Cup first round against AFC Bournemouth, the club's continued poor form was the cause. Barrow's team affairs were shifted to players Paul Jones, David Bayliss and Darren Sheridan. Following a decent run of results, Bayliss and Sheridan were appointed player-managers, and Jones became club captain. Bayliss and Sheridan led Barrow from 20th place in the league in December to fifth, ensuring a place in the playoffs for promotion to the Conference National. They won the semi-final against AFC Telford United 4–0 on aggregate before defeating Stalybridge Celtic in the playoff final at Pirelli Stadium in Burton upon Trent.

Barrow topped the Conference National table during the first few weeks of the following season before the club began to struggle, finding themselves just above the relegation zone by January 2009. They defeated Brentford 2–1 with goals from David Brown and Matt Henney in round two of the FA Cup, their first victory over Football League opposition since their 1972 elimination from the league. Barrow drew an away match against Middlesbrough (a Premier League team) in the third round, losing 2–1. More than 7,000 Barrow fans travelled to Riverside Stadium in Middlesbrough, the highest away attendance in Riverside's 14-year history to date. The cup run earned Barrow about £250,000, allowing investment in playing resources. The club retained their place in the Conference, finishing twentieth.

Following alterations to the squad during the summer, Barrow began its second season in the Conference National in August 2009. The club had a good run after a poor start, losing once in 16 games and reaching the FA Cup third round. They were defeated 3–0 by Premier League team Sunderland at the Stadium of Light on 2 January 2010, watched by 7,500 travelling supporters. On 13 March 2010, a Gregg Blundell goal gave Barrow a 1–0 win at Salisbury City in the first Leg of the FA Trophy semi-final. One week later, a Jason Walker double secured a 2–1 victory in the second Leg to send the Bluebirds to Wembley. After securing their position in the Conference National in the last home match of the season, Barrow won the 2010 FA Trophy Final against Stevenage Borough 2–1 at Wembley Stadium with an extra-time goal by Walker; this made Barrow the only club to win the FA Trophy at the old and new Wembley Stadiums.

The 2010–11 season was less successful, although the club finished in 18th place and remained in the Conference National with a 2–0 victory against Hayes & Yeading on the last day of the season. Barrow failed to retain the FA Trophy, however, losing 2–3 to Conference North team Guiseley. The team was more successful the following season, finishing 13th. Darren Sheridan left the club by mutual consent in February 2012, and Dave Bayliss remained as manager.

The following season, Barrow were relegated from the Conference National after losing 2–1 at Cambridge United on 13 April 2013. Bayliss left the club by mutual consent on 5 November 2013, and Barrow reappointed former caretaker manager Darren Edmondson on 10 December of that year. That season, the club failed to win promotion to the Conference Premier and finished 11th in the Conference North.

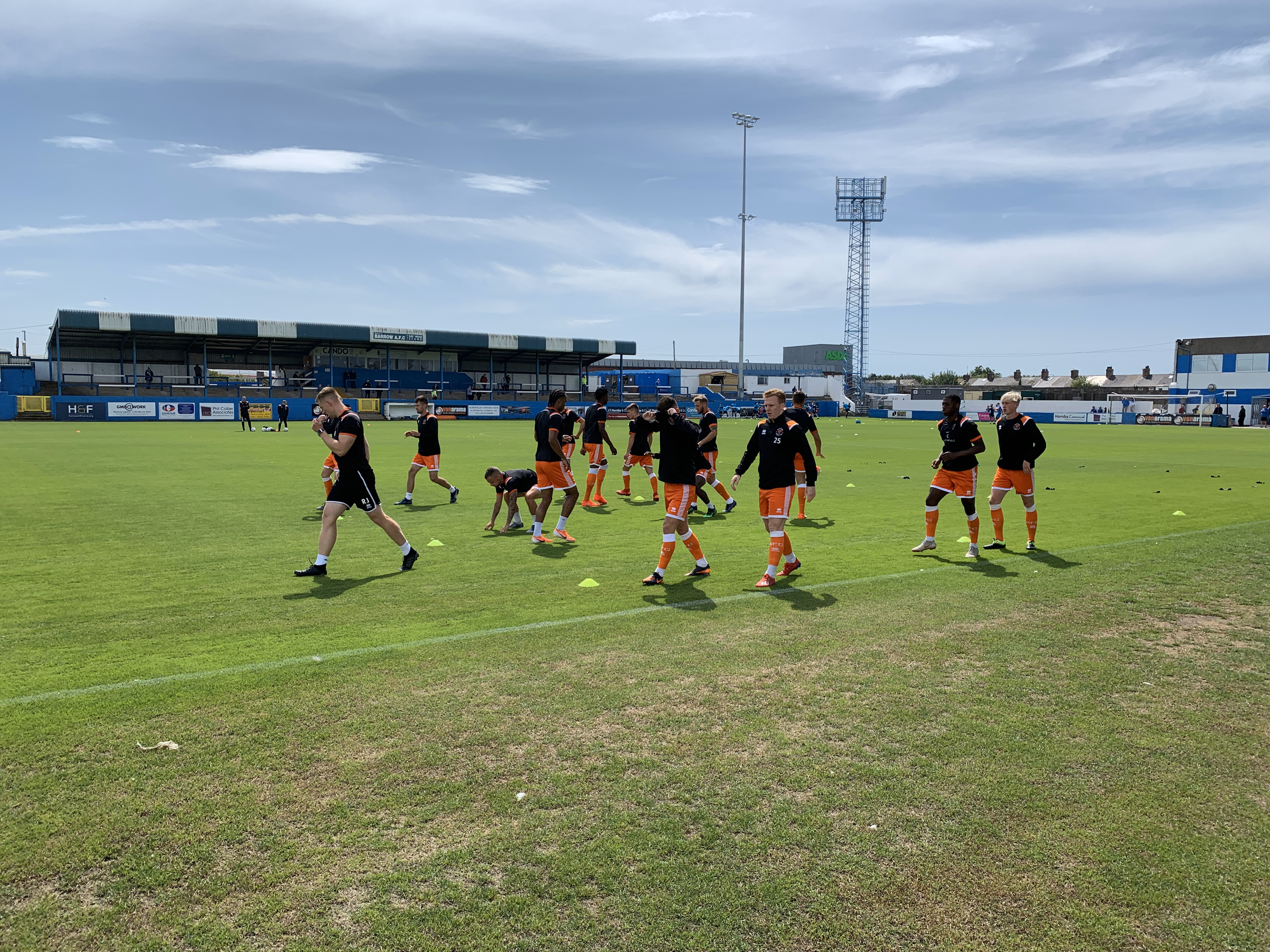
Blackpool players warming up before their friendly at Barrow on 20 July 2019. Barrow manager Ian Evatt was a late substitute, ending his playing career against his 2010–11 Premier League team.

On 1 May 2014, it was announced that club members voted to allow Dallas businessman Paul Casson to complete a takeover. Barrow were 2014–15 Conference North champions, with a 2–3 win away at Lowestoft Town on the final day of the season. Casson aimed for promotion in the club's first season return in the top flight of non-League football. In November 2015, Barrow parted company with manager Darren Edmondson after a poor run left them mid-table and a 1–0 loss to AFC Fylde knocked them out of the 2015–16 FA Cup. The club appointed former Mansfield and Torquay boss Paul Cox manager the following day.

On 20 September 2017, Barrow appointed Micky Moore as first-team manager. Moore was sacked after the club's FA Cup defeat in the fourth qualifying round away at Shaw Lane on 15 October of that year. Former Forest Green Rovers boss Ady Pennock was appointed manager on 27 October, accompanied by assistant manager Jamie Day and player-coach Grant Holt. Barrow narrowly avoided relegation, finishing in 20th place, and Pennock and the club parted company on 18 May 2018.

Former Blackpool and Chesterfield defender Ian Evatt became the club's manager on 15 June. On 24 October 2018, Casson announced he was stepping down as chairman and selling the club; director Paul Hornby led a management buyout of the club. The 2018–19 season was much more successful under Evatt, finishing in 10th place. The following 2019–20 season was even more successful. The Bluebirds were top of the league for most of the season before the disruption caused by the COVID-19 pandemic. The final league table was decided on a points per game basis, meaning Barrow returned to the EFL as champions for the first time since 1972.

=== Return to the Football League (2020–2026) ===
Ahead of Barrow's return to the English Football League for the 2020–21 season, manager Ian Evatt departed for newly relegated Bolton Wanderers and was replaced by former Blackburn Rovers midfielder David Dunn. The club's first Football League match in 48 years ended in a 1–1 draw against Stevenage at Holker Street on 12 September 2020. Barrow recorded their first league victory at the ninth attempt, defeating Mansfield Town 4–2 on 27 October. Following a nine-match winless run, Dunn was dismissed on 13 December, with the club 21st in League Two. Assistant manager Rob Kelly initially took caretaker charge before Michael Jolley was appointed on 23 December. Jolley departed on 21 February 2021 after seven matches in charge, with Kelly returning as caretaker manager for the remainder of the season. Results improved under Kelly, and a 2–0 victory away to Forest Green Rovers on 27 April secured Barrow's Football League status with two matches remaining.

Kelly declined the opportunity to remain as permanent manager, and Mark Cooper was appointed on 28 May 2021. In August, Barrow hosted Premier League side Aston Villa in the second round of the EFL Cup, losing 6–0. The club also reached the third round of the FA Cup, where they were defeated 5–4 after extra time by Barnsley. However, Barrow continued to struggle in the league, and Cooper departed in March 2022 with the club 21st in the table. Former Hull City manager Phil Brown was appointed until the end of the season and secured survival as Barrow finished 22nd. Brown departed in May following unsuccessful negotiations over a permanent contract.

In May 2022, Iain Wood was appointed sporting director, assuming responsibility for the club's football operations in collaboration with the first-team manager, including player recruitment, development and retention. On 27 May, former FC Halifax Town manager Pete Wild was appointed on a three-year contract. Barrow's league performances improved considerably under Wild, with the club finishing ninth in the 2022–23 season. During the 2023–24 season, Barrow challenged for promotion and occupied a play-off position for much of the campaign. However, a run of seven matches without victory at the end of the season saw the club finish eighth, one point outside the play-off positions. Wild departed by mutual agreement on 24 May 2024 following an end-of-season review.

Following Wild's departure, Barrow adopted a head coach structure, with the club announcing that the remaining management team would report to sporting director Wood, who would oversee the recruitment of a new head coach. On 31 May 2024, Stephen Clemence was appointed as the club's first head coach under the new arrangement, signing a two-year contract. Barrow began the 2024–25 season strongly, briefly reaching the top of League Two following a 2–0 victory over Newport County in September. The club also enjoyed a run in the EFL Cup, eliminating Derby County 3–2 on penalties following a goalless draw to reach the third round for the first time since the 1967–68 season. Barrow were subsequently eliminated by Chelsea, losing 5–0 at Stamford Bridge.

On 12 October 2024, Wood was promoted to chief executive officer, retaining his responsibilities as sporting director while assuming oversight of the club's non-playing operations. The appointment placed both football and administrative operations under his leadership. Despite Barrow's promising start to the season, their league form deteriorated, and Clemence was dismissed on 18 January 2025 after eight months in charge, with the club 17th in League Two. On 20 January, Andy Whing was appointed head coach from Solihull Moors on a two-and-a-half-year contract. Under Whing, Barrow lost just one of their final 13 league matches, securing a 16th-place finish. However, following significant changes to the playing squad ahead of the 2025–26 season, the club struggled for consistency. Whing was dismissed on 10 December 2025 following six league matches without victory, leaving Barrow 18th in the table.

Following Whing's departure, Neil McDonald took caretaker charge before Paul Gallagher was appointed head coach on 2 January 2026. Gallagher lost all five of his matches in charge and was dismissed on 11 February, leaving Barrow just three points above the relegation zone. He was replaced by Dino Maamria, who departed after just 28 days in charge, having recorded one victory in six matches. Experienced midfielder Sam Foley was subsequently appointed interim head coach for the remainder of the season, becoming the fifth person to take charge of the first team during the campaign.

On 2 May 2026, Barrow were relegated from League Two following a 2–1 home defeat to Newport County, ending their six-year stay in the English Football League. The club's owners subsequently apologised to supporters following the relegation.

=== Back in non-League (2026–) ===
Following relegation to the National League, Barrow underwent a period of restructuring, beginning with the departure of chief executive Iain Wood on 4 May 2026. On 12 May, Adam Murray was appointed manager on a contract until the summer of 2028, having left Kidderminster Harriers just days after guiding them to promotion from the National League North through the play-offs. Andy Taylor, who had previously worked alongside Murray at AFC Fylde, was appointed assistant manager.

The club began rebuilding its playing squad ahead of the 2026–27 season, releasing six players, including former interim manager Sam Foley and club captain Niall Canavan. Striker Alex Reid became Murray's first signing, joining from Hartlepool United in June. The club also relocated its first-team training operations to Tameside Stadium, the home of Curzon Ashton, ahead of the new season.

Barrow endured a difficult start to their first National League campaign since 2019–20, failing to win any of their opening five league matches. Murray recorded his first victory on 5 September 2026, when Barrow defeated Sutton United 3–0 at Holker Street. Following a defeat to Solihull Moors on 15 September, the team won five consecutive league matches, culminating in a 2–1 away victory over Tamworth on 10 October.

== Colours and badge ==
Barrow's original colours were black-and-white stripes, worn with black shorts following the club's formation in 1901. By 1912, the team had adopted blue shirts with white shorts, and blue and white subsequently became the club's traditional colours. During the mid-20th century, the club also wore blue shirts featuring a white "V". Over the years, Barrow's home kits have varied between predominantly blue and predominantly white designs, occasionally featuring stripes or hoops.

For the 2001–02 season, Barrow returned to black-and-white stripes to celebrate the club's centenary. The club adopted blue-and-white hoops for the 2013–14 season, before reverting to a predominantly white shirt with blue sleeves the following year. In 2026, Barrow again adopted black-and-white stripes for its 125th anniversary home kit, manufactured by Puma. The design was inspired by the club's original 1901 strip and featured gold detailing. The accompanying away kit was entirely royal blue, featuring a subtle wave pattern inspired by the Irish Sea.

In June 2024, the Government of Newfoundland and Labrador became the club's front-of-shirt sponsor under a two-year agreement. The partnership concluded in 2026, when Cumbrian IT company Commited became the club's new front-of-shirt sponsor.

The club's badge incorporates elements of the Barrow-in-Furness coat of arms. The club adopted the town's coat of arms as its crest during the 1950s, before introducing a distinctive design following its promotion to the Third Division in 1967. The badge features a submarine, representing the town's shipbuilding industry; a red rose, symbolising Lancashire, of which Barrow was historically part; and a football. It also incorporates a bee and an arrow, forming a rebus of the town's name ("bee-arrow"). The crest was redesigned in 2014, retaining its principal elements.

== Stadium ==
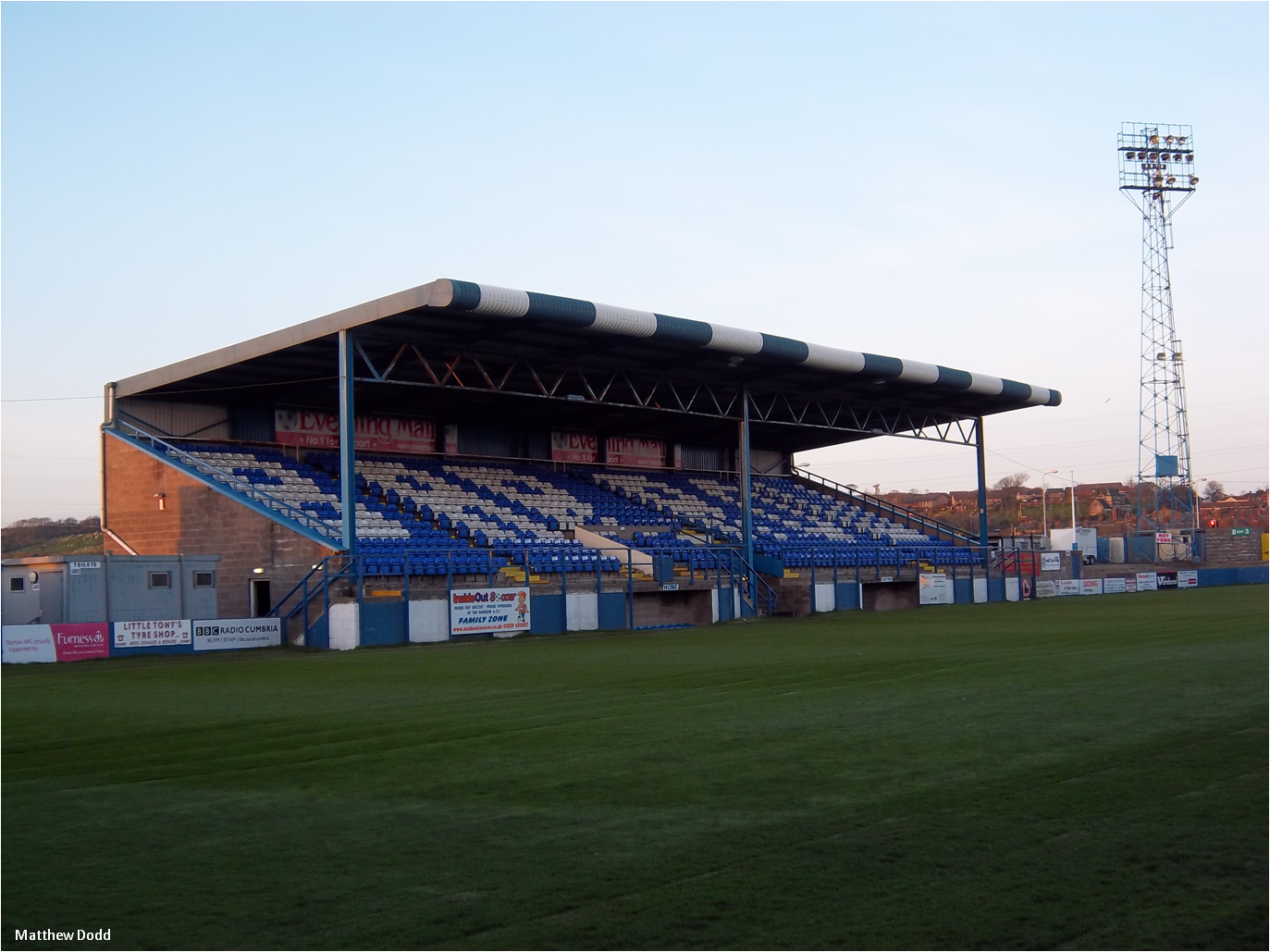
Holker Street stadium at dusk

Following formation in 1901, Barrow played at three different grounds before settling at Holker Street. The club's first home was the Strawberry Ground, situated off Abbey Road. Its distance from the town centre contributed to declining attendances, prompting a move to Ainslie Street in September 1904. However, the new ground's sloping playing surface proved problematic, and in March 1905 the club relocated to Little Park in Roose.

In 1909, Barrow moved to Holker Street, a site previously used as a rubbish dump and home to Hindpool Athletic. The club's first match at the ground ended in a 5–2 victory over Eccles Borough. Holker Street was gradually developed, and by the resumption of football following the Second World War, it featured four fully covered terraced stands. The stadium's record attendance of 16,784 was set in 1954, during an FA Cup third-round tie against Swansea Town.

Floodlights were installed in 1963, while the introduction of speedway racing during the 1970s brought significant alterations to the ground. These included the demolition of the "Steelworks End", which had previously suffered fire damage, the reorientation of the pitch and the removal of the front rows of terracing. Following the removal of the speedway track, the pitch was returned to its original orientation, and a new leisure centre featuring squash courts was constructed.

Under Stephen Vaughan's ownership, an all-seater main stand (named the Brian Arrowsmith Stand in 2017) with a capacity of about 1,000 was built on the Wilkie Road side; the only significant change since then was the removal of an unsafe roof over the Holker Street-end terraces. Described as having "a traditional, old fashioned feel", the ground has three sides of terracing. The Brian Arrowsmith Stand is raised above the centre of the pitch, with flat standing on either side. The Popular Side, opposite the Brian Arrowsmith Stand, consists of an area of covered terracing. In the summer of 2020, a roof was added to the Holker Street End of the ground after the club had won through promotion return to the Football League.

Holker Street has carried several sponsored names, including the Furness Building Society Stadium during the 2010s. In 2019, Progression Solicitors secured the naming rights, with the ground becoming the Progression Solicitors Stadium. In August 2021, the stadium was renamed the Dunes Hotel Stadium under a sponsorship agreement with a local hotel for the 2021–22 season.

In July 2022, SO Legal Ltd secured the naming rights, with the ground becoming the SO Legal Stadium. The agreement was extended for a further two seasons in July 2024, before concluding in the summer of 2026, when the stadium reverted to its original name. In September 2026, Furness Building Society secured a new two-year naming rights agreement, restoring the Furness Building Society Stadium name until 2028.

=== Training ground ===
Although the team plays its home games in Barrow, during the week the team shares the training ground of Curzon Ashton, Manchester (since summer 2026), having previously trained in Salford, Rochdale and Lancaster; amongst other places.

== Players ==
=== Current squad ===
As of 14 October 2026

Note: Flags indicate national team as defined under FIFA eligibility rules; some limited exceptions apply. Players may hold more than one non-FIFA nationality.

No.	Pos.	Nation	Player
1	GK	ENG	Ben Winterbottom
2	DF	ENG	Marcel Oakley
3	DF	IRL	Adam Alimi-Adetoro
4	DF	WAL	MJ Williams
5	DF	ENG	Charlie Raglan
6	MF	ENG	Kennedy Digie
7	FW	ENG	Ollie Crankshaw
8	MF	WAL	Scott Smith
9	FW	ENG	Alex Reid
10	MF	ENG	Keaton Ward
11	FW	ENG	George Walker
17	FW	ENG	Katia Kouyaté

No.	Pos.	Nation	Player
18	FW	SCO	Innes Cameron
22	DF	NIR	Danny Amos
25	DF	ENG	Paul Kalambayi
26	MF	ENG	Rekeem Harper
27	MF	ENG	Isaac Marriott
29	FW	ENG	Tom Barkhuizen
30	DF	ENG	Ben Jackson
32	FW	ENG	Danny Rose
33	DF	ENG	Xavier Benjamin
34	MF	ENG	Ben Whitfield
36	DF	ENG	Thierry Latty-Fairweather
—	GK	ENG	Noah Cooper (on loan from Stoke City)

=== Out on loan ===
Note: Flags indicate national team as defined under FIFA eligibility rules; some limited exceptions apply. Players may hold more than one non-FIFA nationality.

No.	Pos.	Nation	Player
—	MF	ENG	Jack Earing (on loan at Hartlepool United)
—	GK	IRL	Killian Barrett (on loan at Slough Town)

== Management ==
As of 31 May 2026

Position	Name
Manager	(England) Adam Murray
Assistant Manager	(England) Andy Taylor
Goalkeeping Coach	(England) Tom Palmer
Head of Football Operations	(England) Joseph Harvey
Head of Medical	(England) Mark Leather
Sports Therapist	(England) Tom Jones
Sports Therapist	(England) Liam Welby
S&C Coach	(England) Chace Homer
Performance Analyst	(United States) Luca Nicosia

== Managerial history ==
As of 2 May 2026. Only League matches are counted.

Name	Nat	From	To	Record						
Name	Nat	From	To	P	W	D	L	F	A	Win %
Jacob Fletcher	(England)	July 1901	April 1904	78	33	15	30	146	135	42.31%
E. Freeland	(England)	April 1904	????	?	?	?	?	?	?	?
W. Smith	(England)	????	????	?	?	?	?	?	?	?
Alec Craig	(England)	????	May 1907	?	?	?	?	?	?	?
Roger Charnley	(England)	May 1907	????	?	?	?	?	?	?	?
Jacob Fletcher	(England)	????	September 1909	?	?	?	?	?	?	?
Jas P. Phillips	(England)	September 1909	July 1913	?	?	?	?	?	?	?
John Parker	(England)	July 1913	July 1920	114	55	16	43	232	197	48.25%
William Dickinson	(England)	July 1920	May 1922	72	37	11	24	121	82	51.39%
Jimmy Atkinson	(England)	August 1922	March 1923	30	11	4	15	44	43	36.67%
J.E. Moralee	(England)	April 1923	January 1926	112	29	18	65	121	217	25.89%
Robert Greenhalgh	(England)	January 1926	February 1926	2	0	0	2	3	7	0%
William Dickinson	(England)	February 1926	October 1927	67	12	12	43	61	182	17.91%
John S. Maconnachie	(Scotland)	October 1927	December 1928	52	12	15	25	70	116	23.08%
Andy Walker	(Scotland)	January 1929	June 1930	62	16	7	39	74	142	25.81%
Thomas Miller	(Scotland)	June 1930	November 1930	16	3	3	10	17	39	18.75%
John Commins	(England)	November 1930	May 1932	65	36	5	24	137	96	55.38%
Tommy Lowes	(England)	May 1932	April 1937	204	73	47	84	351	378	35.78%
James Y. Bissett	(England)	April 1937	December 1937	19	4	2	13	14	36	21.05%
Fred Pentland	(England)	January 1938	June 1940	84	29	23	32	146	149	34.52%
John Commins	(England)	August 1945	March 1947	54	17	10	27	71	104	31.48%
Andy Beattie	(Scotland)	March 1947	April 1949	95	36	26	33	106	95	37.89%
Jack Hacking	(England)	May 1949	May 1955	272	96	57	119	363	421	35.29%
Joe Harvey	(England)	July 1955	June 1957	92	33	18	41	137	145	35.87%
Norman Dodgin	(England)	July 1957	May 1958	46	13	15	18	66	74	28.26%
Willie Brown	(Scotland)	July 1958	August 1959	46	9	10	27	51	104	19.57%
Bill Rogers	(England)	August 1959	October 1959	15	3	5	7	24	37	20%
Ron Staniforth	(England)	October 1959	July 1964	213	67	61	85	312	360	31.46%
Don McEvoy	(England)	July 1964	July 1967	138	52	32	54	207	235	37.68%
Colin Appleton	(England)	August 1967	January 1969	70	32	13	25	103	90	45.71%
Fred Else	(England)	January 1969	February 1969	5	0	1	4	2	14	0%
Norman Bodell	(England)	March 1969	February 1970	46	9	11	27	38	82	19.57%
Don McEvoy	(England)	February 1970	November 1971	78	15	18	45	88	142	19.23%
Bill Rogers	(England)	November 1971	November 1971	2	0	1	1	2	3	0%
Jack Crompton	(England)	December 1971	June 1972	28	10	5	13	25	40	35.71%
Peter Kane	(England)	July 1972	June 1974	92	25	13	54	98	195	27.17%
Brian Arrowsmith	(England)	July 1974	November 1975	67	12	18	37	61	115	17.91%
Ron Yeats	(Scotland)	December 1975	February 1977	46	15	8	23	61	90	32.61%
Alan Coglan and Billy McAdams	(England) (Northern Ireland)	February 1977	July 1977	21	5	3	13	26	38	23.81%
David Hughes	(England)	July 1977	July 1977	0	0	0	0	0	0	0%
Brian McManus	(England)	July 1977	November 1979	103	31	23	49	115	161	30.10%
Micky Taylor	(England)	November 1979	May 1983	147	52	35	60	192	206	35.37%
Vic Halom	(England)	July 1983	May 1984	42	29	10	3	92	38	69.05%
Peter McDonnell	(England)	July 1984	November 1984	17	5	9	3	27	21	29.41%
Joe Wojciechowicz	(England)	November 1984	December 1984	1	0	0	1	1	3	0%
Brian Kidd	(England)	December 1984	April 1985	19	5	6	8	14	20	26.32%
John Cooke	(England)	April 1985	April 1985	3	1	0	2	3	9	33.33%
Bob Murphy	(England)	April 1985	May 1985	2	0	1	1	2	4	0%
Maurice Whittle	(England)	May 1985	October 1985	12	0	4	8	11	29	0%
David Johnson	(England)	October 1985	March 1986	16	5	2	9	13	28	31.25%
Glenn Skivington and Neil McDonald	(England) (England)	March 1986	March 1986	4	0	0	4	4	10	0%
Ray Wilkie	(England)	March 1986	November 1991	236	93	62	81	325	311	39.41%
Neil McDonald	(England)	November 1991	December 1991	4	1	0	3	7	9	25%
John King	(England)	December 1991	May 1992	22	5	6	11	24	36	22.73%
Graham Heathcote	(England)	May 1992	December 1992	23	10	7	6	40	31	43.48%
Richard Dinnis	(England)	December 1992	October 1993	30	12	6	12	45	40	40%
Mick Cloudsdale	(England)	October 1993	June 1994	31	14	8	9	45	35	45.16%
Tony Hesketh	(England)	June 1994	March 1996	74	32	16	26	121	101	43.24%
Neil McDonald and Franny Ventre	(England) (England)	March 1996	March 1996	2	0	0	2	3	6	0%
Mike Walsh	(England)	March 1996	October 1996	20	11	5	4	32	20	55%
Owen Brown	(England)	October 1996	January 1999	100	49	22	29	127	95	49%
Shane Westley	(England)	January 1999	July 1999	16	4	4	8	13	22	25%
Greg Challender	(England)	July 1999	August 1999	0	0	0	0	0	0	0%
Kenny Lowe	(England)	August 1999	May 2003	176	78	46	52	307	233	44.32%
Lee Turnbull	(England)	May 2003	November 2005	102	41	28	33	164	146	40.20%
Darren Edmondson	(England)	November 2005	December 2005	3	1	2	0	5	3	33.33%
Phil Wilson	(England)	December 2005	November 2007	78	20	24	34	85	100	25.64%
Darren Sheridan and David Bayliss	(England) (England)	November 2007	February 2012	168	59	50	59	215	220	35.11%
David Bayliss	(England)	February 2012	November 2013	91	15	16	30	59	110	16.48%
Alex Meechan	(England)	November 2013	December 2013	4	0	2	2	3	12	0%
Darren Edmondson	(England)	December 2013	November 2015	96	46	21	29			47.92%
Paul Cox	(England)	November 2015	August 2017	86	37	30	19			43.02%
Micky Moore	(England)	August 2017	October 2017	11	1	4	6	9	14	9.09%
Neill Hornby	(England)	October 2017	October 2017	1	0	0	2	4	6	0%
Ady Pennock	(England)	October 2017	May 2018	17	6	5	6			35.29%
Ian Evatt	(England)	June 2018	July 2020	83	38	20	25	120	90	45.78%
David Dunn	(England)	July 2020	December 2020	22	2	11	9	22	28	9.09%
Rob Kelly	(England)	December 2020	December 2020	3	2	0	1	6	2	66.67%
Michael Jolley	(England)	December 2020	February 2021	7	1	1	5	4	9	14.28%
Rob Kelly	(England)	February 2021	May 2021	19	8	3	8	21	20	42.11%
Mark Cooper	(England)	May 2021	March 2022	37	8	13	16	33	43	21.62%
Phil Brown	(England)	March 2022	May 2022	9	2	1	6	11	14	22.22%
Pete Wild	(England)	May 2022	May 2024	78	33	14	31	98	94	42.31%
Stephen Clemence	(England)	May 2024	January 2025	25	7	7	11	23	28	28%
Andy Whing	(England)	January 2025	December 2025	46	15	13	18	54	58	32.61%
Neil McDonald	(England)	December 2025	January 2026	5	1	1	4	8	9	20%
Paul Gallagher	(Scotland)	January 2026	February 2026	5	0	0	5	4	11	0%
Dino Maamria	(Tunisia)	February 2026	March 2026	6	1	1	4	4	10	16.7%
Sam Foley	(Republic of Ireland)	March 2026	May 2026	11	2	2	7	10	23	18.18%
Adam Murray	(England)	May 2026								

== League history ==
From	To	League	Level	Total Seasons
1901–02	1902–03	Lancashire League	N/A	2
1903–04	1904–05	Lancashire Combination Division Two	N/A	2
1905–06	1907–08	Lancashire Combination Division One	N/A	3
1908–09	1910–11	Lancashire Combination Division Two	N/A	5
1911–12	1920–21	Lancashire Combination Division One	N/A	6
1921–22	1957–58	Football League Division Three North	3	31
1958–59	1966–67	Football League Division Four	4 ▼	9
1967–68	1969–70	Football League Division Three	3 ▲	3
1970–71	1971–72	Football League Division Four	4 ▼	2
1972–73	1978–79	Northern Premier League	5 ▼	7
1979–80	1982–83	Alliance Premier League	5	4
1983–84	1983–84	Northern Premier League	6 ▼	1
1984–85	1985–86	Alliance Premier League	5 ▲	2
1986–87	1988–89	Northern Premier League	6 ▼	3
1989–90	1991–92	Football Conference	5 ▲	3
1992–93	1997–98	Northern Premier League	6 ▼	6
1998–99	1998–99	Football Conference	5 ▲	1
1999–00	2003–04	Northern Premier League	6 ▼	5
2004–05	2007–08	Conference North	6	4
2008–09	2012–13	Conference National	5 ▲	5
2013–14	2014–15	Conference North	6 ▼	2
2015–16	2019–20	National League	5 ▲	5
2020–21	2025–26	EFL League Two	4 ▲	6
2026–27	Present	National League	5 ▼	

== Records ==
- Record attendance: 16,874 vs. Swansea Town, 9 January 1954
- Best league performance: 8th in Third Division, 1967–68
- Best FA Cup performance: Third round, 1945–46, 1947–48, 1953–54, 1955–56, 1958–59, 1963–64, 1966–67, 1967–68, 1990–91, 2008–09, 2009–10, 2016–17, 2021–22
- Best League Cup performance: Third round, 1962–63, 1967–68, 2024–25
- Best League Trophy performance: Round of 32 (Northern Section), 2022–23
- Best FA Trophy performance: Winners, 1989–90, 2009–10

== Honours ==
League

- Fourth Division (level 4)
  - Promoted: 1966–67
- National League (level 5)
  - Champions: 2019–20
- Conference North (level 6)
  - Champions: 2014–15
  - Play-off winners: 2008
- Northern Premier League
  - Champions: 1983–84, 1988–89, 1997–98
  - Runners-up: 2002–03
- Lancashire Combination Division One
  - Champions: 1920–21
  - Runners-up: 1913–14,
- Lancashire Combination Division Two
  - Runners-up: 1904–05, 1910–11

Cup

- FA Trophy
  - Winners: 1989–90, 2009–10
- Lancashire Senior Cup
  - Winners: 1954–55, 2023–24
- Northern Premier League Challenge Cup
  - Runners-up: 1987–88
- Northern Premier League President's Cup
  - Winners: 2001–02, 2003–04
- Peter Swales Shield
  - Winners: 1984–85
- Lancashire Junior Cup
  - Winners: 1980–81
