= Roose =

Suburb of Barrow-in-Furness, Cumbria, England

Coordinates: 54.096°N 3.182°W

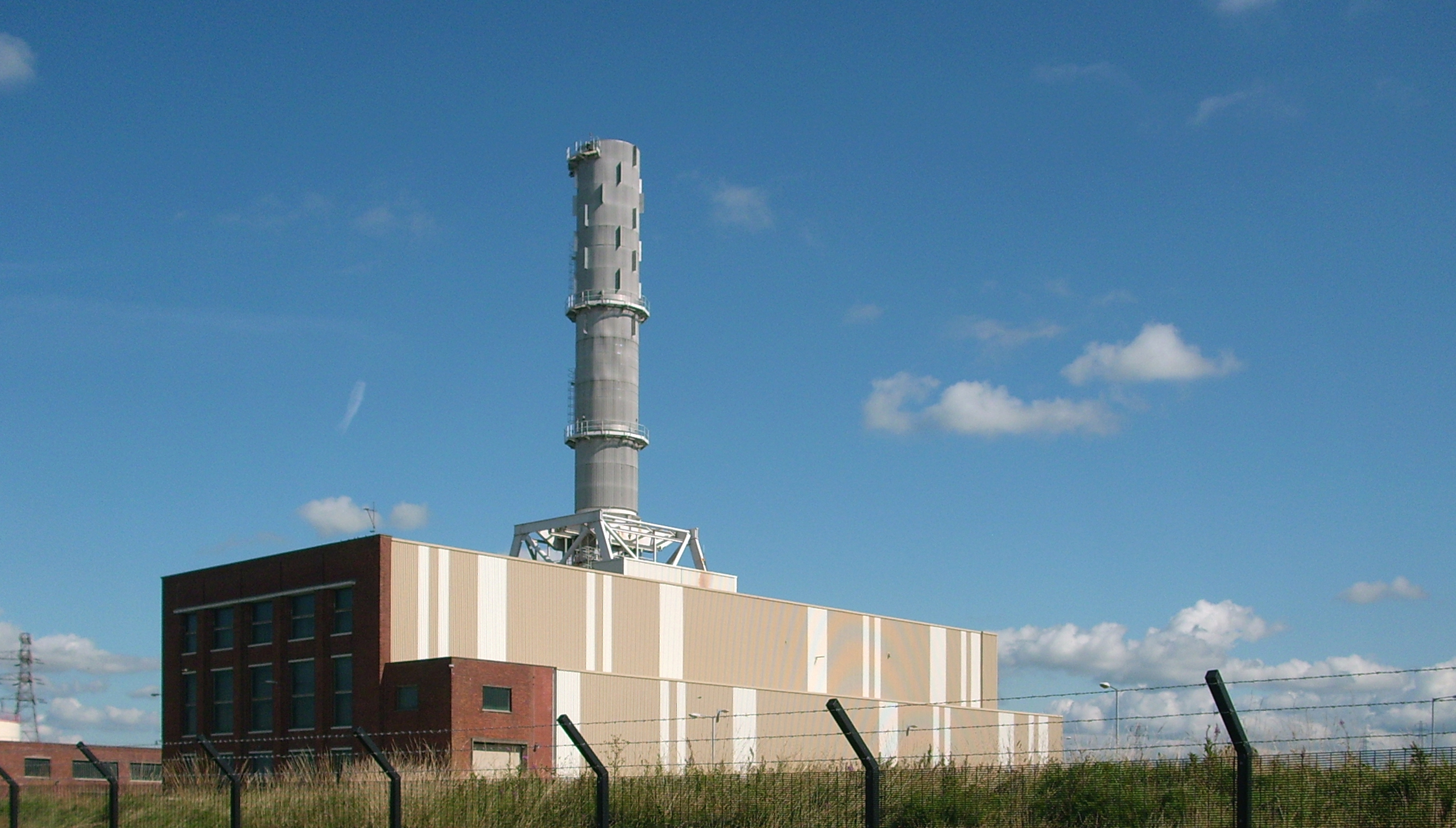
- Roosecote Power Station, now demolished

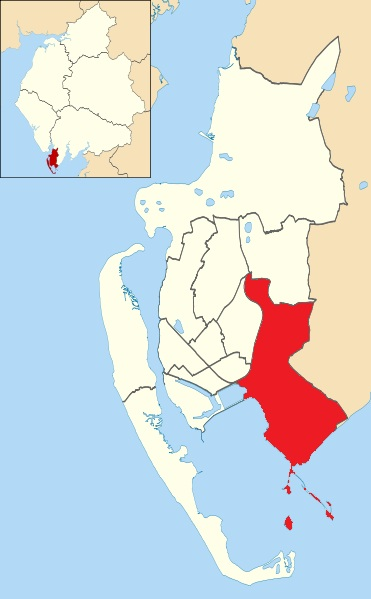
- Roose shown within Barrow-in-Furness
- Population: 4,724 (2011 Ward)
- Unitary authority: Westmorland and Furness
- Ceremonial county: Cumbria
- Region: North West
- Country: England
- Sovereign state: United Kingdom
- Post town: BARROW-IN-FURNESS
- Postcode district: LA13
- Dialling code: 01229
- Police: Cumbria
- Fire: Cumbria
- Ambulance: North West
- UK Parliament: Barrow and Furness

Roose or Roosecote is a suburb and ward of Barrow-in-Furness, Cumbria, England. The word 'roose' is Celtic for "moor" or "heath" and the suffix 'cote' of Roosecote means "hut" or "huts" (the word 'cottage' is derived from 'cote'). Before the building of Roose Cottages and the arrival of the Cornish miners Roose was pronounced with a hard S, as in goose; now it is locally pronounced 'Rooze', due to the Cornish accent. Roose is served by Roose railway station, one of the few remaining stations on the Furness Line in the Barrow area.

The ward of Roose also encompass the settlements of Rampside and Stank, as well as Piel Island and Roa Island, it extends as far north as Abbot's Wood Nature Reserve.

Whilst still an electoral ward for Barrow Town Council, the ward was combined at a district/ local authority level wit Risedale ward in April 2023 to become the Risedale and Roosecote ward following the formation of the new Westmorland and Furness Local Authority.

== History ==
Roose has been in existence since at least 945 AD. Roose is mentioned in the Domesday Book as one of the townships forming the Manor of Hougun which was held by Tostig Godwinson, Earl of Northumbria. Roosecote and Roose were originally two separate entities. Roosecote was founded by Michael le Fleming (of Aldingham) some time between 1107 and 1152. By 1157 both Roose and Roosecote were granges belonging to Furness Abbey. In 1537 with the dissolution of that abbey they returned to the Crown along with the rest of the abbey's lands.

Roose is mainly used to refer to the 19th century settlement of Roose Cottages, which consists of two main streets of terraced housing—North and South Row. These were built when the area was developing as an important mining centre, with newly opened mines in Stank and Yarlside. Many were originally inhabited by Cornish tin miners that were recruited to the area. In the 1881 census the majority of the population had birthplaces in Cornwall (70%). The Cottages were built by the owners of the mines, the Haematite Mining Company, between 1876 and 1878.

Roose was also home to a workhouse built between 1878 and 1879 and opened in February 1880. It had around 300 inmates. It later became Roose Hospital but was closed in the 1980s with the opening of Furness General Hospital, and later demolished. The site is now mostly a housing development.

A multiple sports venue called Little Park existed from the 1880s until the late 1930s and hosted Barrow Raiders, Barrow Bombers and Barrow A.F.C. at various times.

== Roose today ==
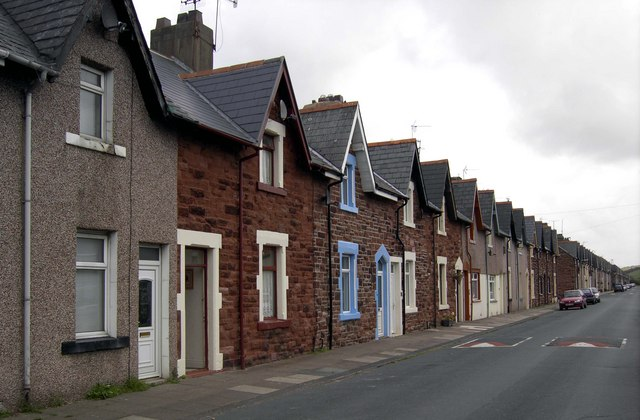
South Row, Roose

A modern expansion of Roosecote is the Holbeck or Yarlside estate which has some early twentieth century housing but has mainly been developed and expanded from the 1960s onwards by building on land of the Holker estate. The area is bound by Yarlside Road to the west and Leece Lane to the south. Streets named after trees predominate throughout.

There is a dairy works in Roose and historically there were several farms in the area, Roosecote farm is still active, and Roose Farm is now a private dwelling, and another, which is now part of Holbeck, was converted into the Crofters pub in the 1980s. Roosecote also includes Old Roose close to the Roose railway station with a small number of houses around the Ship Inn. A corn mill was situated on the stream now call Red River just north of the Railway stop but was demolished sometime between 1847 and 1891.

Roose railway station (an unmanned stop), which serves the suburb, is located on the Furness Line, giving connections to Barrow, Millom, Ulverston, Grange-over-Sands and Lancaster.

The area has a post office, two shops, two pubs and two primary schools—Roose and Yarlside. Roose Hospital (closed in the 1980s) contained in its last years geriatric and gynaecological wards: further housing developments have taken place on the site of the hospital.

Roosecote is home three churches, two of which have since closed. An Anglican-Methodist shared church called St Perran's, was built in 1967 and was located on North Row. The structure became defunct in 2014 and was demolished in 2016. A house has since been built on the site. Stonedyke Methodist Chapel was opened in 1877 and eventually closed in 1991. The building is privately owned and derelict. Finally, St Michaels in Rampside, which was built in 1840. It is the only remaining church in the area, but due to a dwindling congregation and mounting maintenance costs, the church is threatened with closure and even demolition.

Roosecote power station was converted from coal to now generate electricity from gas. Gas from the Morecambe Bay and Irish Sea gasfields comes on shore at a terminal for British Gas located between Roose and Rampside. The plant was decommissioned in 2012 after being mothballed, and was demolished between 2014 and 2015. There are plans to build a new, smaller backup and storage gas plant on the site. The site is also home (at the time of its building) to the largest battery in the UK (which is used to stabilize the electrical grid).
