= 1998 Barrow-in-Furness Borough Council election =

1998 UK local government election

Elections to Barrow-in-Furness Borough Council were held on 7 May 1998. One third of the council was up for election and the Labour party stayed in overall control of the council.

After the election, the composition of the council was

- Labour 23
- Conservative 11
- Others 4

== Results ==
Barrow-in-Furness local election result 1998
Party	Seats	Gains	Losses	Net gain/loss	Seats %	Votes %	Votes	+/−
Conservative	8			+7	50.0			
Labour	7			-8	43.8			
Others	1			+1	6.3			
