= List of Labour Party breakaway parties (UK) =

Since the founding of the Labour Party in 1900 as a "broad church", it has seen a steady number of splits and breakaway factions, mainly between the moderate/right-wing and doctrinaire/left-wing sides. Breakway parties are the inverse of entryism, most significantly seen with Militant within Labour, before their expulsion. The most significant breakaway was the Gang of Four forming the SDP in 1981 over economic policy versus the short-lived Gang of Seven forming The Independent Group in 2019 as a protest over Brexit. Both those splits followed the election of a left-wing leader, Michael Foot and Jeremy Corbyn respectively, to the discontent of many right-wing MPs in the Parliamentary Labour Party. Another "catastrophic" split happened in 1931 when Labour was in the National Government. Compared to Labour, the Conservative Party has been "much better at keeping its internal divisions out of the public glare." Some of the breakaway organisations have stayed as independent parties, some have become defunct, while others have merged back with the parent party or other political parties. Generally, the breakways have been too small, split over too few issues, and formed not distinctive enough a party to be sustained.

Year	Party	Notes
1918	Coalition Labour	Formed mainly by Labour ministers in the wartime coalition government. Returned several seats at the 1918 General Election alongside the allied National Democratic and Labour Party, a Labour rival. By 1922 Coalition Labour's MPs had retired or lost their seats and the NDP merged with the National Liberal Party .
1931	National Labour Organisation	Founded by Ramsay MacDonald to continue his National Government, which was opposed by Labour and led to his expulsion. MacDonald stayed as Prime Minister, but National Labour only returned 13 seats. His son Malcolm MacDonald continued the party, which was moribund by 1936 and disestablished ahead of the 1945 General Election.
1931	New Party	Led by Oswald Mosley following his resignation from Ramsey MacDonald's National Government, the party promoted a "fusion of socialist and Keynesian economics" and, controversially, stronger powers for the cabinet. It merged into Moseley's British Union of Fascists in 1932.
1940	Oxford University Democratic Socialist Club	Founded by Anthony Crosland and Roy Jenkins as an anti-communist alternative to the-then militant Oxford University Labour Club. Merged with the OULC in 1943.
1949	Labour Independent Group	The group was formed by three Labour MPs who were expelled for voting against joining NATO, as well as two others earlier expelled for supporting the Soviet Union. All five lost their seats in the 1950 General Election and the group disbanded.
1964	Militant	Also known as the Militant Tendency, Militant had its roots in the Revolutionary Socialist League's entryism into the Labour Party. Headed by Ted Grant, the founding in 1964 of their newspaper, The Militant, edited by Peter Taaffe, was a key moment. In 1982, the Labour National Executive Committee refused to allow Militant to formally affiliate and expelled prominent members, with more explusions under Kinnock in the mid-to-late 1980s. Following the Anti-Poll Tax protests, Militant moved away from entryism and became first Militant Labour and then in 1997 the Socialist Party.
1972	Democratic Labour	Democratic Labour was founded by Dick Taverne after he was deselected by his Lincoln constituency party for his pro-Common Market stance. He resigned as an MP and won the subsequent by-election. The party worked with the Social Democratic Alliance and the Association of Democratic Groups in 1980 to found a new nationwide centre party, which resulted in the founding of the Social Democratic Party in 1981.
1975	Social Democratic Alliance	Founded as a right-wing Labour Party faction, expelled in 1980 when they openly supported candidates against Labour. Helped form the Social Democratic Party in 1981, which they merged into.
1976	Scottish Labour Party	Not to be confused with the later national branch of the Labour Party, the Scottish Labour Party was founded in 1976 by former Labour MPs disappointed at the government's failure to deliver Scottish devolution. They lost their seats in 1979 and disbanded in 1981.
1981	Social Democratic Party (SDP)	The SDP was founded primarily by the "Gang of Four", Labour MPs - all previously in the cabinet - who disagreed with the direction of the party and favoured the centre ground. It received a quarter of the vote but only two dozen seats. The party merged with the Liberals in 1989 to create the Liberal Democrats.
1987	Moderate Labour Party	Moderate Labour was associated with the anti-strike Union of Democratic Mineworkers, mainly formed by ex-Labour councillors and MEPs from the right of the party in Nottinghamshire, especially Mansfield. It stood in local and general elections against Labour in 1987, with little success.
1995	Socialist People's Party	Founded by four Barrow Labour councillors suspended for opposing a budget, first known as the People's Labour Party. Chair Jim Hamezeian stood in Barrow and Furness in the 1997 general election, gaining 1,995 votes, 4.1%. They won four seats in the 2008 local elections, and Hamezian won one on Cumbria County Council in 2009. Support then declined and they deregistered in 2015.
1996	Socialist Labour Party	Founded in May 1996 by former NUM leader Arthur Scargill as a reaction to New Labour, with several Labour councillors defecting, it has become regarded as a "fringe party".
1997	Socialist Party (England and Wales)	Following the founding of the Socialist Party from Militant (above), the party has had little influence outside the far left, unsuccessfully applying to affiliate with the-then Corbyn-led Labour in 2016. It has formed several broad left alliances: the Socialist Alliance, No2EU, Campaign for a New Workers' Party, and the Trade Unionist and Socialist Coalition.
1998	Democratic Labour Party	Formed by defecting Labour councillors. Dissolved itself in 2016, after its last councillor, Pete Smith, lost his seat on Walsall Council.
2003	Idle Toad	Initially a newsletter and label used by a deselected Labour councillor in South Ribble from 1997, it was formed as a party in 2003 and held seats on South Ribble District Council and Lancashire County Council until 2013.
2018	Aspire	Aspire is the successor to Tower Hamlets First, founded by Lutfur Rahman following the 2010 decision by Labour's NEC to block him from standing as mayor. THF was deregistered in 2015 due to malpractice with its councillors sitting as an independent group before Apsire was then founded. Both THF and Aspire have controlled Tower Hamlets London Borough Council.
2019	Independent Group for Change (Change UK, The Independent Group)	Founded as The Independent Group (TIG) in February 2019 by seven centrist Labour MPs dissatisfied with Corbyn's leadership and Brexit negotiations, later joined by several Conservative defectors. Known as Change UK and then Independent Group for Change, it splintered in July when four of its MPs founded The Independents. Some left to join the Liberal Democrats, some retired, and none retained their seats at the December general election, after which both groups disbanded.
2019	Birkenhead Social Justice Party	Founded by Frank Field after he resigned from Labour. Deregistered in 2020 following Field's loss in the general election.
2021	Breakthrough Party	Formed as a democratic socialist party by Labour members and councillors after Keir Starmer became Labour leader. Merged with Transform in December 2023, which merged with Your Party in December 2025
2022	Liverpool Community Independents	Five former Labour councillors suspended for voting Labour's budget joined three already-suspended members to form the group. At the 2023 Liverpool City council election, the party won three seats, three down from their eight before the election.
2023	One Leicester	Locallist party founded by a Labour councillor and former assistant mayor who was expelled from Labour. One of their parliamentary candidates was former Labour MP Keith Vaz.
2023	Social Justice Party	Founded mainly by "disaffected Labour members" in North Yorkshire, the party was joined by an independent councillor who was earlier a Labour councillor. Deregistered in 2025
2024	Flintshire People's Voice	Formed in 2024 when five councillors on Flintshire County Council defected from the ruling Labour administration.
2025	Your Party	Founded by MPs Zarah Sultana, suspended from Labour in 2024, and Jeremy Corbyn, the former Labour leader who was expelled in 2024 for standing as an independent after his Labour candidacy was blocked.
2025	The Potteries Party	Founded by former Labour members in Stoke-on-Trent dissatisfied with the parliamentary candidate selection, the party has one councillor on Stoke-on-Trent City Council after he defected from Labour.
2025	Black Country Party	Founded by six councillors on Dudley Metropolitan Borough Council who were previously independents, and before that Labour.
2025	Broxtowe Alliance (formerly Broxtowe Independents)	Formed by a mass defection of Labour councillors on Broxtowe Borough Council – some of whom said they had been blocked from reselection – over "traditional Labour values", the party runs the borough as a minority administration. They also have a seat on Nottinghamshire County Council.

== See also ==
- List of elected British politicians who have changed party affiliation
