= Borough of Barrow-in-Furness =

Former local government district in England

- Borough and non-metropolitan district
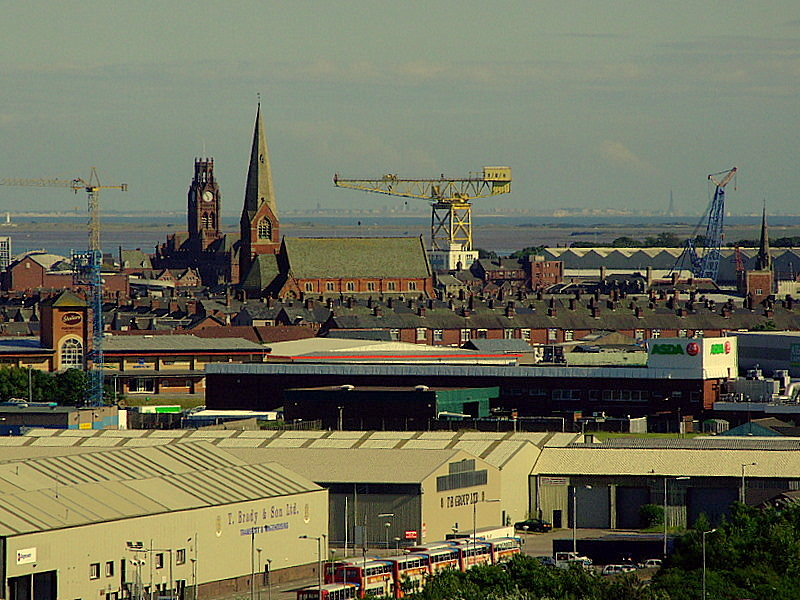
- Skyline of Barrow-in-Furness

- Coat of arms Logo

- Shown within Cumbria
- Coordinates (Barrow-In-Furness Town Centre): 54.11155°N 3.22614°W
- Sovereign state: United Kingdom
- Constituent country: England
- Region: North West England
- Ceremonial county: Cumbria
- Historic county: Lancashire
- Founded: 1 April 1974
- Abolished: 31 March 2023
- Admin. HQ: Barrow Town Hall, Barrow-in-Furness

Government
  - Type: Barrow-in-Furness Borough Council
  - Leadership: Alternative – Sec.31

Area
  - Total: 30.08 sq mi (77.90 km^{2})

Population (2021)
  - Total: 67,375
  - Density: 2,240/sq mi (864.9/km^{2})
- Time zone: UTC+0 (Greenwich Mean Time)
  - Summer (DST): UTC+1 (British Summer Time)
- Area code: 01229
- ONS code: 16UC (ONS); E07000027 (GSS)
- Ethnicity (2021): 95.7% White British; 1.4% White Other; 1.4% Asian; 0.8% Mixed Race; 0.4% Black; 0.4 Other
- Website: www.barrowbc.gov.uk

Barrow-in-Furness was a local government district with borough status in Cumbria, England. It was named after its main town, Barrow-in-Furness. Other settlements included Dalton-in-Furness and Askam-in-Furness. It was the smallest district in Cumbria, but the most densely populated, with 924 people per square kilometre. The population was 71,980 in 2001, reducing to 69,087 at the 2011 Census.

In July 2021 the Ministry of Housing, Communities and Local Government announced that in April 2023, Cumbria would be reorganised into two unitary authorities. On 1 April 2023, Barrow-in-Furness Borough Council was abolished and its functions transferred to the new authority Westmorland and Furness, which also covers the former districts of Eden and South Lakeland.

== Background ==
The area covered by the district was at the edge of the Furness peninsula. It jolted into the Irish Sea, being north of Morecambe Bay and south of the Duddon Estuary. The borough was formed on 1 April 1974 by the merger of the former county borough of Barrow-in-Furness and the Dalton-in-Furness urban district from the administrative county of Lancashire. Despite being one of England's smallest local authorities it had a coastline of 63 km and has equally diverse built and natural environments. This included 274 Listed buildings and four SSSIs, ranking as the seventh highest concentration of 325 districts on the English Heritage Index as of 2015.

== Barrow Borough Council ==
Barrow-in-Furness Borough Council sat at the Town Hall in Barrow. It was led by a mayor, who was elected by council members. In 2006, the council was fined £125,000 for violation of health and safety laws that led to the deaths of seven people in the United Kingdom's worst outbreak of Legionnaires' disease. The council also became the UK's first public body to be charged with corporate manslaughter, but was found not guilty.

Following boundary changes in 2008, the council was composed of 36 seats, elected across 13 wards. From 2011 the council switched from the previous system of elections occurring over a four-year cycle, with a third of seats elected each year and one 'fallow' year, to one where full council elections occur every four years.

From its inception in 1973 until abolition in 2023, the council was often under Labour control, most recently from the 2011 election, but with three years of Conservative control (1976–1979) and ten years of no overall control (most recently from 2006 to 2011).

Composition at abolition
As of 31 March 2023

Affiliation	Members
Labour Party	22
Conservative Party	8
Furness Independent Councillors	3
Communist Party of Britain	1

== Council wards ==
The Borough of Barrow-in-Furness comprised thirteen electoral wards, all of which can be seen on the map below.

== Freedom of the Borough ==
The following people and military units had received the Freedom of the Borough of Barrow-in-Furness.

=== Individuals ===
- Margaret Burrow: 25 September 2022.

=== Military Units ===
- The Royal Navy Submarine Service: 11 June 2001.
