= List of schools in Barrow-in-Furness =

This is a list of schools in Barrow-in-Furness, Cumbria, England.

There are 26 schools in Barrow educating at a primary level (including infant and junior schools), three secondary schools and two colleges of further education. Chetwynde School, formerly a private school educates at all three levels. Although all educational institutes in the town are now state-funded, a number have varying degrees of governance. Furness Academy and Walney School are academies, while schools in the list below marked 'VA' or 'VC' are voluntary aided or controlled (primarily by faith groups).

== State-funded schools ==
=== Primary schools ===
- Barrow Island Community Primary School
- Brisbane Park Infant School
- Cambridge Primary School
- Chetwynde School
- Dane Ghyll Community Primary School
- Greengate Infant & Nursery School
- Greengate Junior School
- Hindpool Nursery School
- Holy Family Catholic Primary School (VA)
- Newbarns Primary School
- Newton Primary School
- North Walney Primary School
- Ormsgill Primary School
- Ramsden Infant School
- Roose School
- Sacred Heart Catholic Primary School (VA)
- South Walney Infant and Nursery School
- South Walney Junior School
- St Columba's Catholic Primary School (VA)
- St George's CofE School (VC)
- St James' CofE Junior School (VA)
- St Paul's CofE Junior School (VA)
- St Pius X Catholic Primary School (VA)
- Vickerstown School
- Victoria Infant and Nursery School
- Victoria Junior School
- Yarlside Primary School

=== Secondary schools ===
- Chetwynde School
- Furness Academy
- St Bernard's Catholic High School
- Walney School

=== Special schools ===
- George Hastwell School
- Newbridge House PRU

== Further education ==
- Barrow Sixth Form College
- Chetwynde School
- Furness College

== Former schools ==
- Alfred Barrow School
- Barrow Boys Grammar School
- Barrow Girls Grammar School
- Barrow Higher Grade School
- John Whinnerah Institute
- Barrow Technical School
- Parkview Community College of Technology
- Risedale School
- Thorncliffe School

== See also ==
- List of schools in Westmorland and Furness
