= List of alumni of Hertford College, Oxford =

A list of alumni of Hertford College, Oxford, including alumni of its two predecessor institutions, Hart Hall and Magdalen Hall.

== Hart Hall (1282–1740) ==
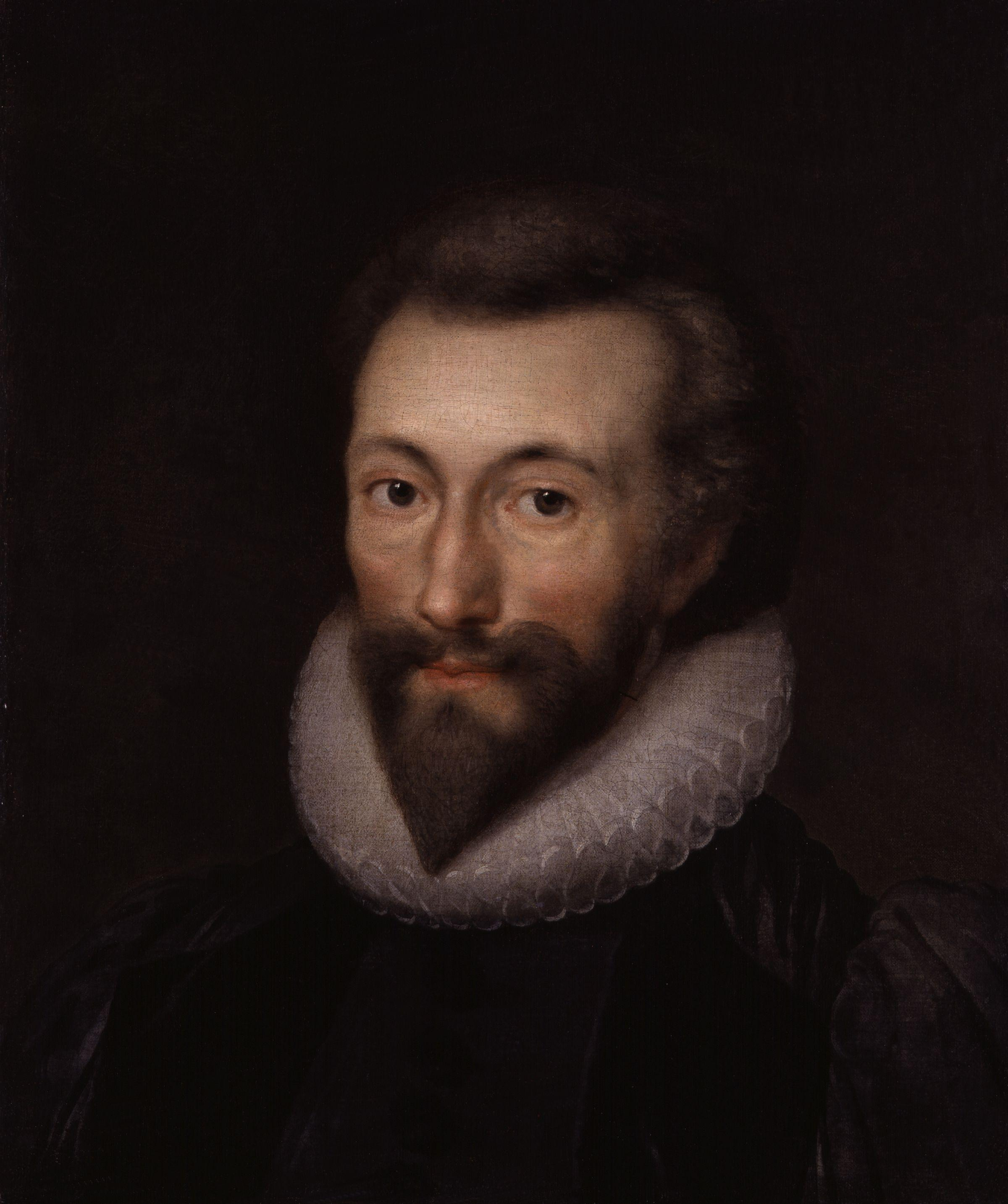
John Donne

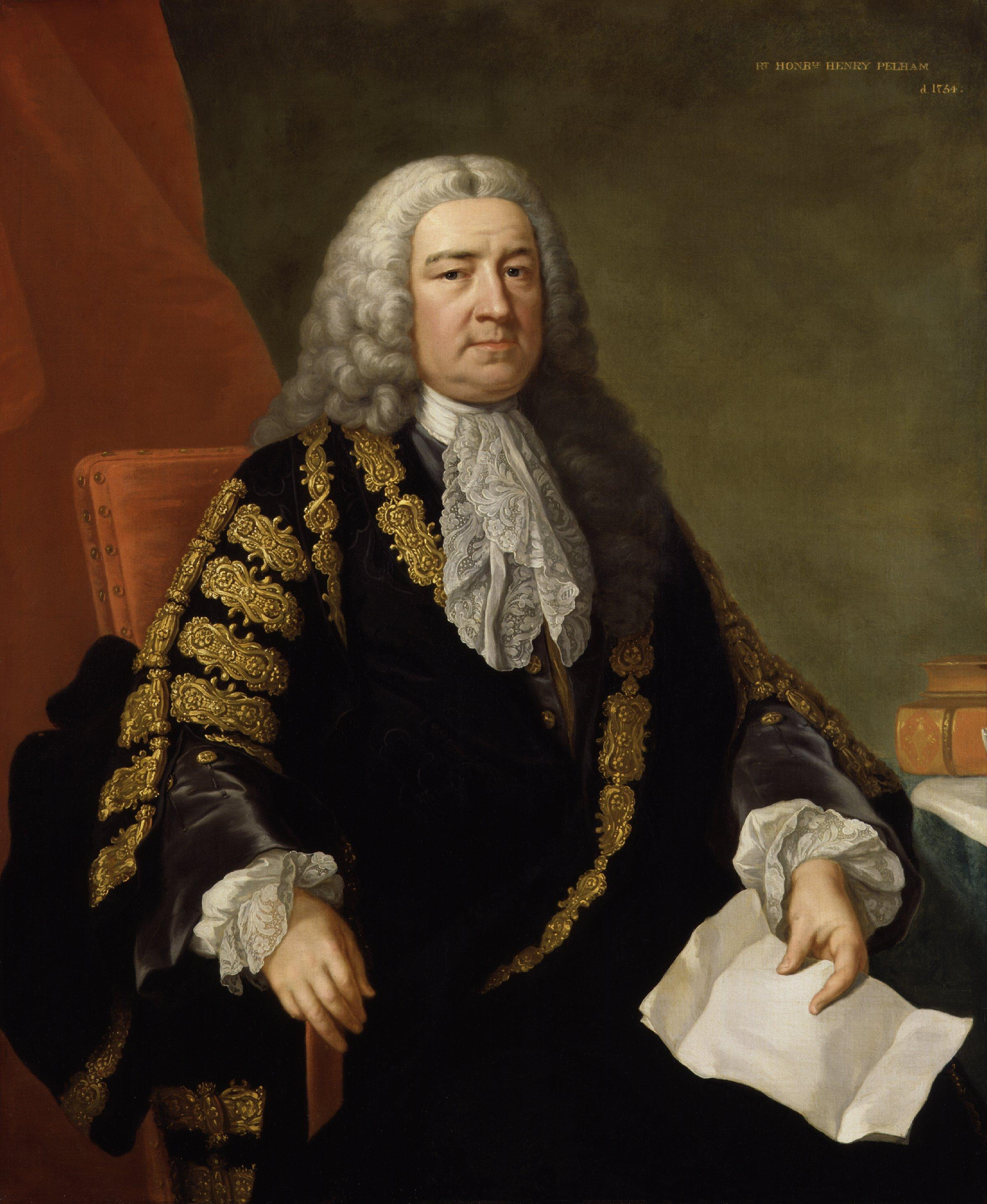
Henry Pelham

- Joseph Bowles, Bodley's Librarian
- Thomas Bray, clergyman and abolitionist
- Saint Alexander Briant, Jesuit martyr
- Henry Bromley, politician
- Reginald Scot, politician, author
- Morgan Coleman, MP for Newport, Cornwall
- John Donne, poet, Anglican priest
- Payne Fisher, poet
- Nicholas Fuller, Hebraist, philologist
- John Glynne, jurist
- Peter Heylyn, polemicist
- John Hutchins, antiquary
- Thomas Manton, Puritan clergyman and chaplain to Oliver Cromwell
- John Norden, cartographer
- Henry Pelham, British Whig Prime Minister
- John Selden, jurist, MP for Oxford University
- George Augustus Selwyn, politician
- Thomas Shirley, politician, soldier, adventurer, and privateer
- Jonathan Swift, satirist, poet, Anglican priest, author of Gulliver's Travels
- Henry Swinburne, ecclesiastical lawyer

== Hertford College, first foundation 1740–1816 ==
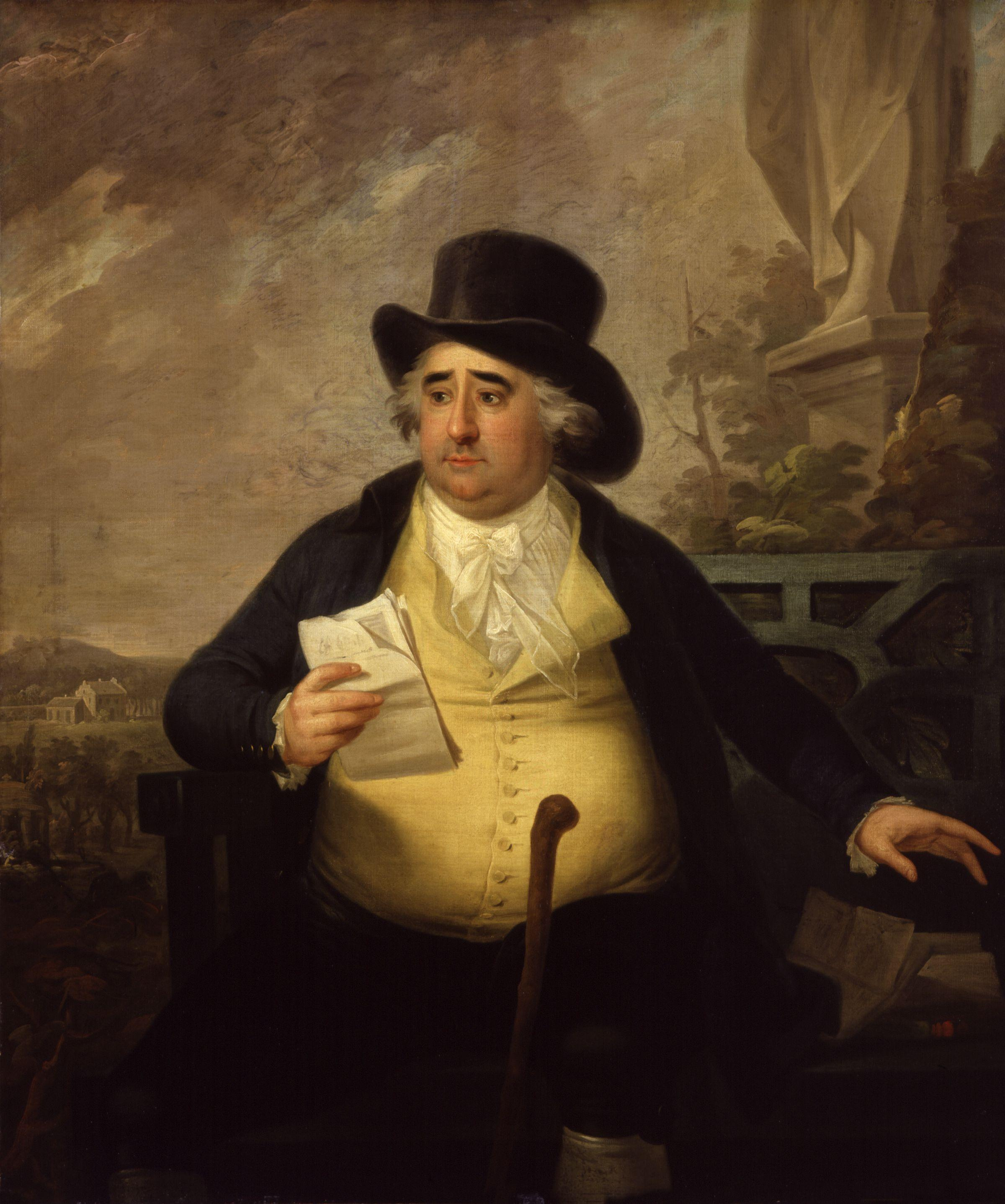
Charles James Fox

- Charles James Fox, Whig statesman
- John Hippisley, politician, diplomat

== Magdalen Hall, old site 1480–1822 ==
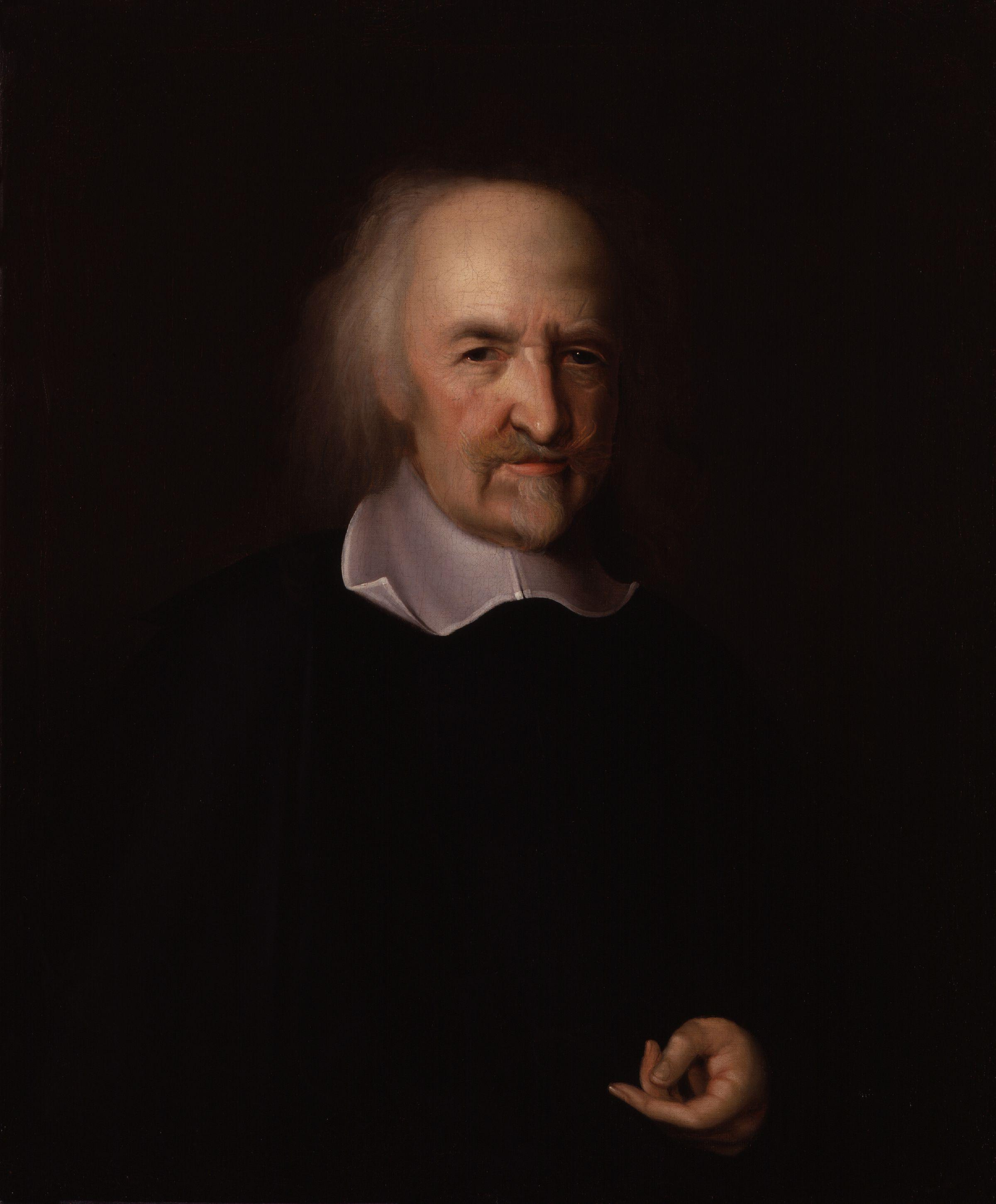
Thomas Hobbes

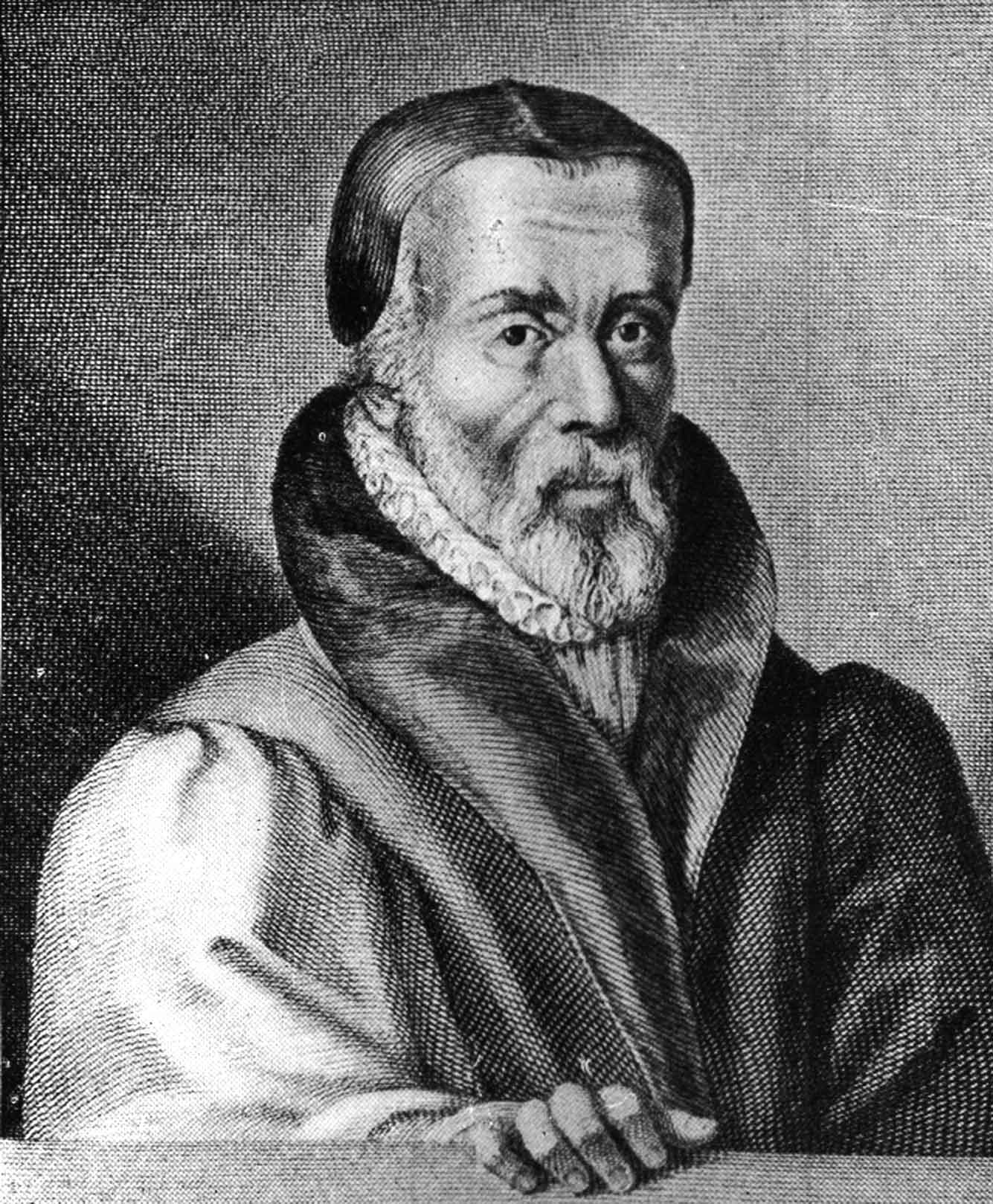
William Tyndale

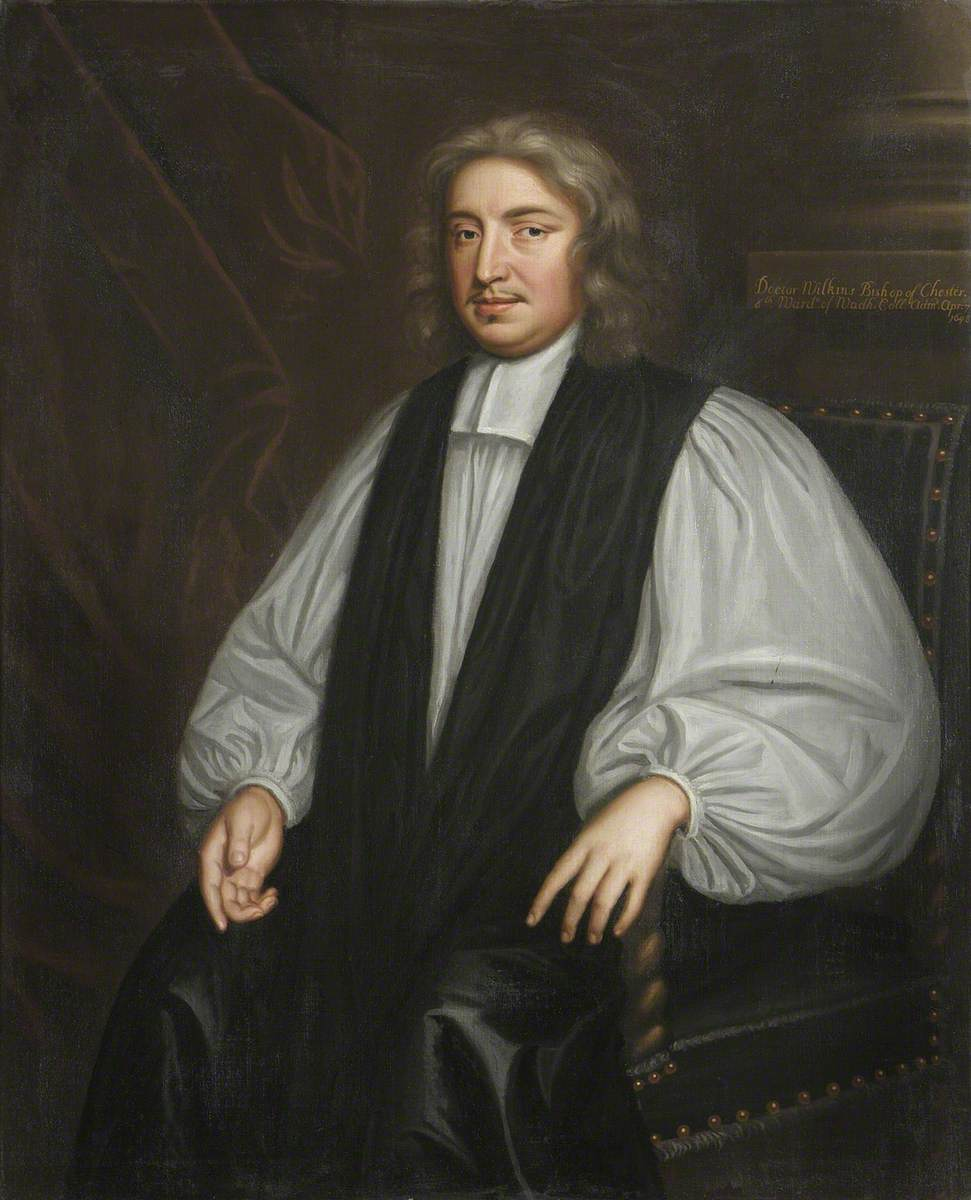
John Wilkins

- Robert Ashley, writer
- Daniel Burgess, Presbyterian minister
- Matthew Bryan, Jacobite preacher
- Walter Charleton, Epicurean philosopher
- Samuel Daniel, poet, historian
- Matthew Hale, Lord Chief Justice
- Thomas Hobbes, political philosopher, author of Leviathan
- John Huckell, poet
- Edward Hyde, 1st Earl of Clarendon, historian, statesman
- John Gilbert, Archbishop of York
- Narcissus Marsh, Primate of All Ireland
- Richard Morton, physician
- Philip Nye, clergyman and member of the Westminster Assembly of Divines
- Robert Plot, naturalist, first Professor of Chemistry at the University of Oxford, and first Keeper of the Ashmolean Museum
- John Rickman, statistician
- Obadiah Sedgwick, clergyman and member of the Westminster Assembly of Divines
- George Shaw, biologist
- Fleetwood Sheppard, courtier
- William Tyndale, Bible translator, Reformation martyr
- Henry Vane the Younger, Parliamentarian statesman
- Sir Ralph Verney, 1st Baronet, of Middle Claydon, politician
- William Waller, Parliamentarian soldier
- John Wilkins, naturalist, Warden of Wadham College, Oxford, and founder of the Royal Society
- Benjamin Woodbridge, clergyman and controversialist

== Magdalen Hall, new site 1822–1874 ==
- Montagu Burrows, first Chichele Professor of Modern History
- William Robinson Clark, theologian
- William Cowper, first Dean of Sydney
- John Thadeus Delane, journalist
- Clement Jackson, founder of the Amateur Athletic Association
- Arthur Mayo VC, soldier
- Francis McDougall, first Anglican bishop of Labuan and the Kingdom of Sarawak
- Brownlow North, evangelist
- Thorold Rogers, political economist
- William Williams, first Anglican Bishop of Waiapu, New Zealand
- Leonard Williams, third Bishop of Waiapu (son of William Williams)
- Nathaniel Woodard, Priest in the Church of England, founder of the Woodard Corporation

== Hertford College, second foundation 1874– ==
- Richard Addinsell, composer of film music
- Helen Alexander, businesswoman
- C. A. J. Armstrong, historian
- Sharon Ashbrook, chemist
- Bernard Ashmole, archaeologist, art historian
- Andrea Ashworth, author, academic
- Christopher Ballinas Valdés, Mexican public policy expert and civil servant
- Edmund Bartley-Denniss, politician and cyclist
- Charles Bean, war correspondent and historian
- John Behan, educationist, jurist
- Marian Bell, economist
- Catherine Bennett, journalist
- David Blomfield, leader of the Liberal Party group on Richmond upon Thames Council, writer, book editor and local historian
- Martin Bridson FRS, mathematician
- Jasmine Brown, author
- Isaac Hawkins Browne, industrialist
- Fiona Bruce, BBC newsreader
- Rupert Bruce-Mitford, archaeologist and scholar
- Anthony Bushell, actor
- Carole Cadwalladr, journalist
- Walter Carey, clergyman
- Victor Cha, national security specialist
- Jean Chapdelaine, diplomat
- Calvin Cheng, Singapore modelling agency head, former Nominated Member of Parliament
- William Robinson Clark, theologian
- Wesley Coe, Olympic athlete
- Nick Cohen, political journalist
- Geoffrey Corbett, civil servant and mountaineer
- W. Maxwell Cowan, neuroscientist
- Sherard Cowper-Coles, diplomat
- George Dangerfield, journalist, historian
- Daniel Dennett, philosopher of the mind
- David Dilks, historian
- Jack Herbert Driberg, anthropologist
- Bill Duff, Arabist
- Jack Duppa-Miller, sailor
- Alfred Earle, bishop
- J. Meade Falkner, novelist, The Lost Stradivarius
- Richard W. Fisher, diplomat
- Warren Fisher, civil servant
- Adam Fleming, BBC newsreader
- Thomas Fletcher, diplomat
- Nicholas Foulkes, historian, journalist
- Henry Sanderson Furniss, 1st Baron Sanderson, socialist educationalist
- Helen Ghosh, Master of Balliol College, Oxford, former Director-General of the National Trust.
- Pinny Grylls, documentary film maker
- Krishnan Guru-Murthy, Channel 4 newsreader
- Gideon Henderson, geochemist, climate-change scientist
- Nicholas Henderson, diplomat
- Jeremy Heywood, civil servant
- Leonard Hodgson, church historian
- Eric Hussey, Olympic athlete
- Jeffrey John, Dean of St Alban's Cathedral
- James John Joicey, amateur entomologist
- Mark S. Joshi, financial mathematician
- Natasha Kaplinsky, ITN newsreader
- Khalid Jawed Khan, Attorney General of Pakistan
- Soweto Kinch, jazz saxophonist, rapper
- Mark A. Lemmon FRS, Chair of Pharmacology at Yale University School of Medicine
- Seth Lerer, literary critic
- Alain LeRoy Locke, writer of the Harlem Renaissance
- Jurek Martin, journalist
- Ronald Martland, former justice of the Supreme Court of Canada
- Gavin Maxwell, naturalist, author of Ring of Bright Water
- Arthur Mayo, recipient of the Victoria Cross
- Roland Michener, former Governor General of Canada
- Dom Mintoff, former Prime Minister of Malta
- Ian Morison FRAS, 35th Gresham Professor of Astronomy
- John Shannon Munn, Cricketer and businessman
- David Naylor, medical researcher
- Edward Max Nicholson, founder of the World Wildlife Fund
- Richard Norton-Taylor, journalist, playwright
- Elizabeth Norton, historian and author
- Richard Parsons, founder of CGP Guides
- Peter Pears, tenor
- Barbara A. Perry, constitutional lawyer
- James Pettifer, scholar of the Balkans
- Bridget Phillipson, MP for Houghton and Sunderland South
- Tracey Poirier, Rhodes Scholar, first female Vermont Army National Guard general officer
- Maisie Richardson-Sellers, actor
- Nigel Saul, historian
- Joseph Gordon Saunders, composer
- Jacqui Smith, former British Home Secretary
- David Spedding, former Head of MI6
- Manisha Tank, CNN newsreader
- Thum Ping Tjin, the first Singaporean to swim the English Channel
- Ed Vulliamy, journalist and world reporter
- Evelyn Waugh, author of Brideshead Revisited, journalist
- Roger Westbrook, diplomat
- Byron White, U.S. Associate Supreme Court Justice
- Athol Williams, South African poet and social philosopher
- Tobias Wolff, author of This Boy's Life
- Nathaniel Woodard, educationalist
- Alison Young, legal scholar, Sir David Williams Professor of Public Law at the University of Cambridge
