= List of schools in Westmorland and Furness =

This is a list of schools in Westmorland and Furness, a unitary authority in England.

== State-funded schools ==
=== Primary schools ===
- Allithwaite CE Primary School, Allithwaite
- Alston Primary School, Alston
- Ambleside CE Primary School, Ambleside
- Appleby Primary School, Appleby-in-Westmorland
- Armathwaite School, Armathwaite
- Arnside National CE School, Arnside
- Asby Endowed School, Great Asby
- Askam Village School, Askam-in-Furness
- Barrow Island Community Primary School, Barrow-in-Furness
- Beaconside CE Primary School, Penrith
- Beetham CE Primary School, Beetham
- Bolton Primary School, Bolton
- Brisbane Park Infant School, Barrow-in-Furness
- Brough Community Primary School, Church Brough
- Broughton CE Primary School, Broughton-in-Furness
- Brunswick School, Penrith
- Burlington CE School, Kirkby-in-Furness
- Burton Morewood CE Primary School, Burton-in-Kendal
- Calthwaite CE School, Calthwaite
- Cambridge Primary School, Barrow-in-Furness
- Cartmel CE Primary School, Cartmel
- Castle Park School, Kendal
- Chapel Street Infants and Nursery School, Dalton-in-Furness
- Chetwynde School, Barrow-in-Furness
- Church Walk CE Primary School, Ulverston
- Clifton Primary School, Clifton
- Coniston CE Primary School, Coniston
- Croftlands Infant School, Ulverston
- Croftlands Junior School, Ulverston
- Crosby Ravensworth CE School, Crosby Ravensworth
- Crosscrake CofE Primary School, Stainton
- Crosthwaite CE School, Crosthwaite
- Culgaith CE School, Culgaith
- Dalton St Mary's CE Primary School, Dalton-in-Furness
- Dane Ghyll Community Primary School, Barrow-in-Furness
- Dean Barwick Primary School, Witherslack
- Dean Gibson RC Primary School, Kendal
- Dent CE Primary School, Dent
- Flookburgh CE Primary School, Flookburgh
- George Romney Primary School, Dalton-in-Furness
- Ghyllside Primary School, Kendal
- Goodly Dale Primary School, Windermere
- Grange CE Primary School, Grange-over-Sands
- Grasmere CE Primary School, Grasmere
- Grayrigg CE School, Grayrigg
- Greengate Junior School, Barrow-in-Furness
- Greystoke Primary School, Greystoke
- Hawkshead Esthwaite Primary School, Hawkshead
- Heron Hill Primary School, Kendal
- High Hesket CE School, High Hesket
- Holme Primary School, Holme
- Holy Family RC Primary School, Newbarns
- Ireleth St Peter's CE Primary School, Ireleth
- Ivegill CE School, Ivegill
- Kirkby Stephen Primary School, Kirkby Stephen
- Kirkby Thore School, Kirkby Thore
- Kirkoswald CE School, Kirkoswald
- Langdale CE School, Chapel Stile
- Langwathby CE Primary School, Langwathby
- Lazonby CE Primary School, Lazonby
- Leven Valley CE Primary School, Backbarrow
- Levens CE School, Levens
- Lindal and Marton Primary School, Lindal-in-Furness
- Lindale CE Primary School, Lindale
- Long Marton School, Long Marton
- Low Furness CE Primary School, Great Urswick
- Lowther Endowed School, Hackthorpe
- Milburn School, Milburn
- Milnthorpe Primary School, Milnthorpe
- Morland Area CE Primary School, Morland
- Nenthead Primary School, Nenthead
- Newbarns Primary School, Barrow-in-Furness
- Newton Primary School, Newton-in-Furness
- North Lakes School, Penrith
- North Walney Primary School, Walney
- Old Hutton CE School, Kendal
- Ormsgill Nursery and Primary School, Barrow-in-Furness
- Orton CE School, Orton
- Our Lady of the Rosary RC Primary School, Dalton-in-Furness
- Parkside Academy, Barrow-in-Furness
- Patterdale CE School, Patterdale
- Pennington CE School, Pennington
- Penny Bridge CE School, Greenodd
- Penruddock Primary School, Penruddock
- Plumpton School, Plumpton
- Ramsden Infant School, Barrow-in-Furness
- Roose School, Barrow-in-Furness
- Sacred Heart RC Primary School, Barrow-in-Furness
- St Catherine's RC Primary School, Penrith
- St Columba's School, Walney
- St Cuthbert's RC Primary School, Windermere
- St George's CE School, Barrow-in-Furness
- St James' CE Junior School, Barrow-in-Furness
- St Mark's CE Primary School, Natland
- St Martin & St Mary CE Primary School, Windermere
- St Mary's CE Primary School, Kirkby Lonsdale
- St Mary's RC Primary School, Ulverston
- St Oswald's CE Primary School, Burneside
- St Patrick's CE School, Endmoor
- St Paul's CE Junior School, Barrow-in-Furness
- St Pius X RC Primary School, Barrow-in-Furness
- St Thomas's CE Primary School, Kendal
- Sedbergh Primary School, Sedbergh
- Selside Endowed CE Primary School, Selside
- Shap Endowed CE Primary School, Shap
- Sir John Barrow School, Ulverston
- Skelton School, Skelton
- South Walney Infant and Nursery School, Walney
- South Walney Junior School, Walney
- Stainton CE Primary School, Stainton
- Staveley CE Primary School, Staveley
- Storth CE School, Storth
- Stramongate Primary School, Kendal
- Tebay Primary School, Tebay
- Temple Sowerby CE Primary School, Temple Sowerby
- Threlkeld CE Primary School, Threlkeld
- Vicarage Park CE Primary School, Kendal
- Vickerstown School, Walney
- Victoria Academy, Barrow-in-Furness
- Victoria Infant School, Barrow-in-Furness
- Warcop CE Primary School, Warcop
- Yanwath Primary School, Yanwath
- Yarlside Academy, Barrow-in-Furness

=== Secondary schools ===
- Appleby Grammar School, Appleby-in-Westmorland
- Cartmel Priory School, Cartmel
- Chetwynde School, Barrow-in-Furness
- Dallam School, Milnthorpe
- Dowdales School, Dalton-in-Furness
- Furness Academy, Barrow-in-Furness
- John Ruskin School, Coniston
- Kirkbie Kendal School, Kendal
- Kirkby Stephen Grammar School, Kirkby Stephen
- The Lakes School, Troutbeck Bridge
- Queen Elizabeth Grammar School, Penrith
- Queen Elizabeth School, Kirkby Lonsdale
- Queen Elizabeth Studio School, Kirkby Lonsdale
- Queen Katherine School, Kendal
- St Bernard's Catholic High School, Barrow-in-Furness
- Samuel King's School, Alston
- Settlebeck School, Sedbergh
- Ullswater Community College, Penrith
- Ulverston Victoria High School, Ulverston
- Walney School, Walney

=== Special and alternative schools ===
- George Hastwell School, Walney
- Newbridge House PRU, Barrow-in-Furness
- Sandgate School, Kendal
- Sandside Lodge School, Ulverston

=== Further education ===
- Barrow Sixth Form College, Barrow-in-Furness
- Furness College, Barrow-in-Furness
- Kendal College, Kendal

== Independent schools ==
=== Primary and preparatory schools ===
- Hunter Hall School, Penrith
- Sedbergh Preparatory School, Casterton

=== Senior and all-through schools ===
- Sedbergh School, Sedbergh
- Windermere School, Windermere

=== Special and alternative schools ===
- Appletree School, Natland
- Cairn Education, Staveley
- Cambian Whinfell School, Kendal
- Fell House School, Grange-over-Sands
- Moorfield Learning Centre, Barrow-in-Furness
- Oversands School, Witherslack
- South Lakes Academy, Kendal
- SwitchED2, Meathop
- Underley Garden School, Kirkby Lonsdale
- Wings School, Whassett
