= Barrow Sixth Form College =

Part of Furness College, in Barrow-in-Furness, Cumbria, England

Coordinates: 54°07′47″N 3°12′00″W

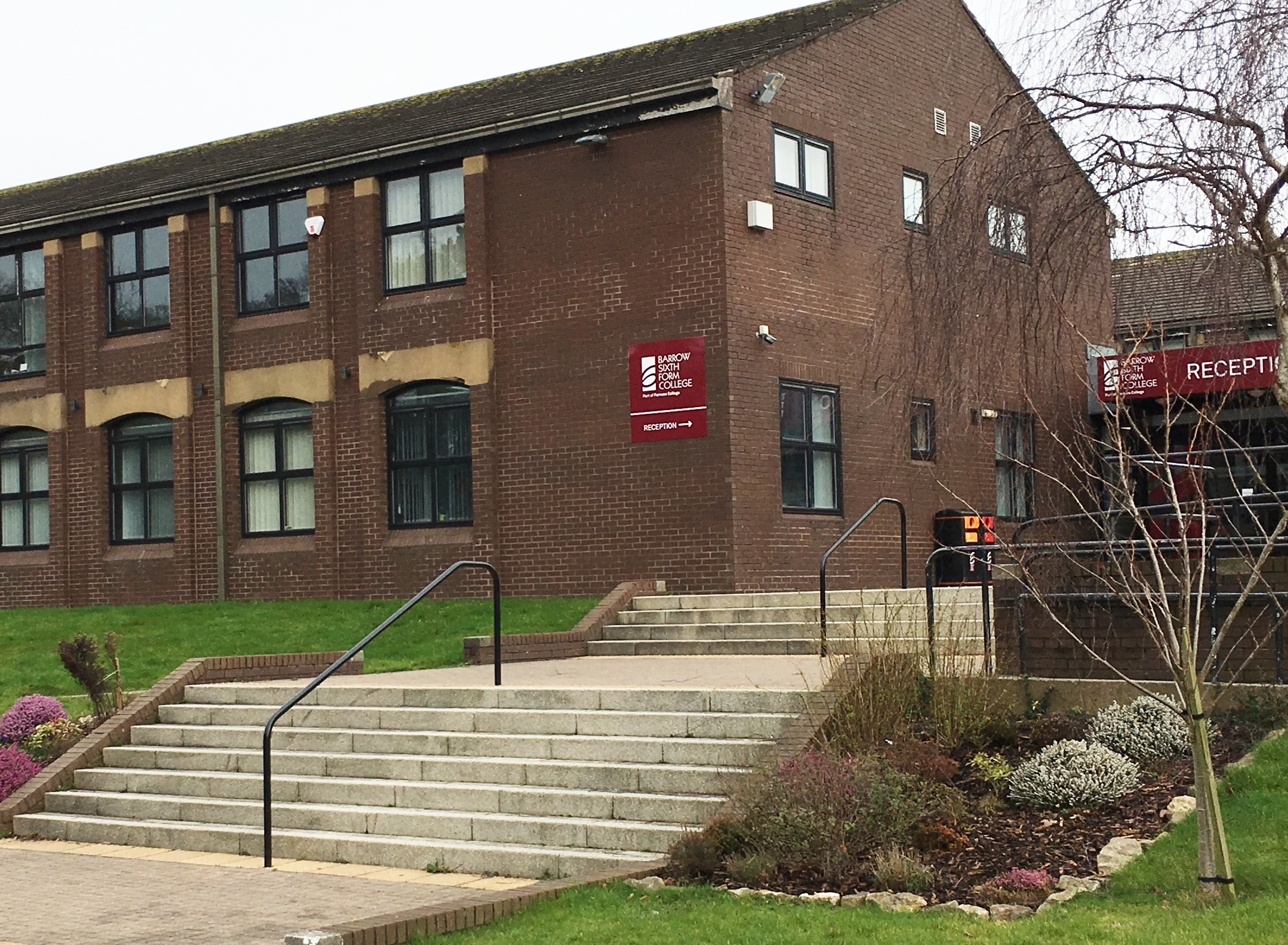
- Rating Lane Campus

Location
- Rating Lane; Barrow-in-Furness, Cumbria, LA13 9LE; England

Information
- Type: Further Education
- Established: 1979
- Local authority: Westmoreland & Furness Council
- Chair: Interim in post
- Principal/Chief Executive: Nichola Cove
- Gender: Mixed
- Age: 16+
- Enrolment: 320
- Website: Furness College

Barrow Sixth Form College, no longer considered a sixth form college, is part of Furness College, and is in the outskirts of Barrow-in-Furness, Cumbria, England. Barrow Sixth Form College was established in 1979 to fulfil the role of the main A level provider in Barrow following the merger of the two Barrow Grammar Schools and their change to deliver education to only 11 to 16 year-olds. It was the only sixth form college in Cumbria before the removal of the Barrow Sixth Form College name in 2024. There are now no sixth form colleges in Cumbria.

In 2024, the Furness College leadership team permanently removed the name of 'Barrow Sixth Form College', in place since 1979, and replaced it with ‘the sixth form’. This marks the end of the only sixth form college in Cumbria.

== Profile ==
As part of Furness College, the college is the largest provider of education and training in south Cumbria offering a wide range of A levels and technical/professional courses to its students. The college works closely with its local community providing a wide range of part-time and full-time courses and links closely to the courses offered at the Channelside campus.

The college has around 950 students aged 16–18, of which over 300 study at the Rating Lane campus.

== Campus ==
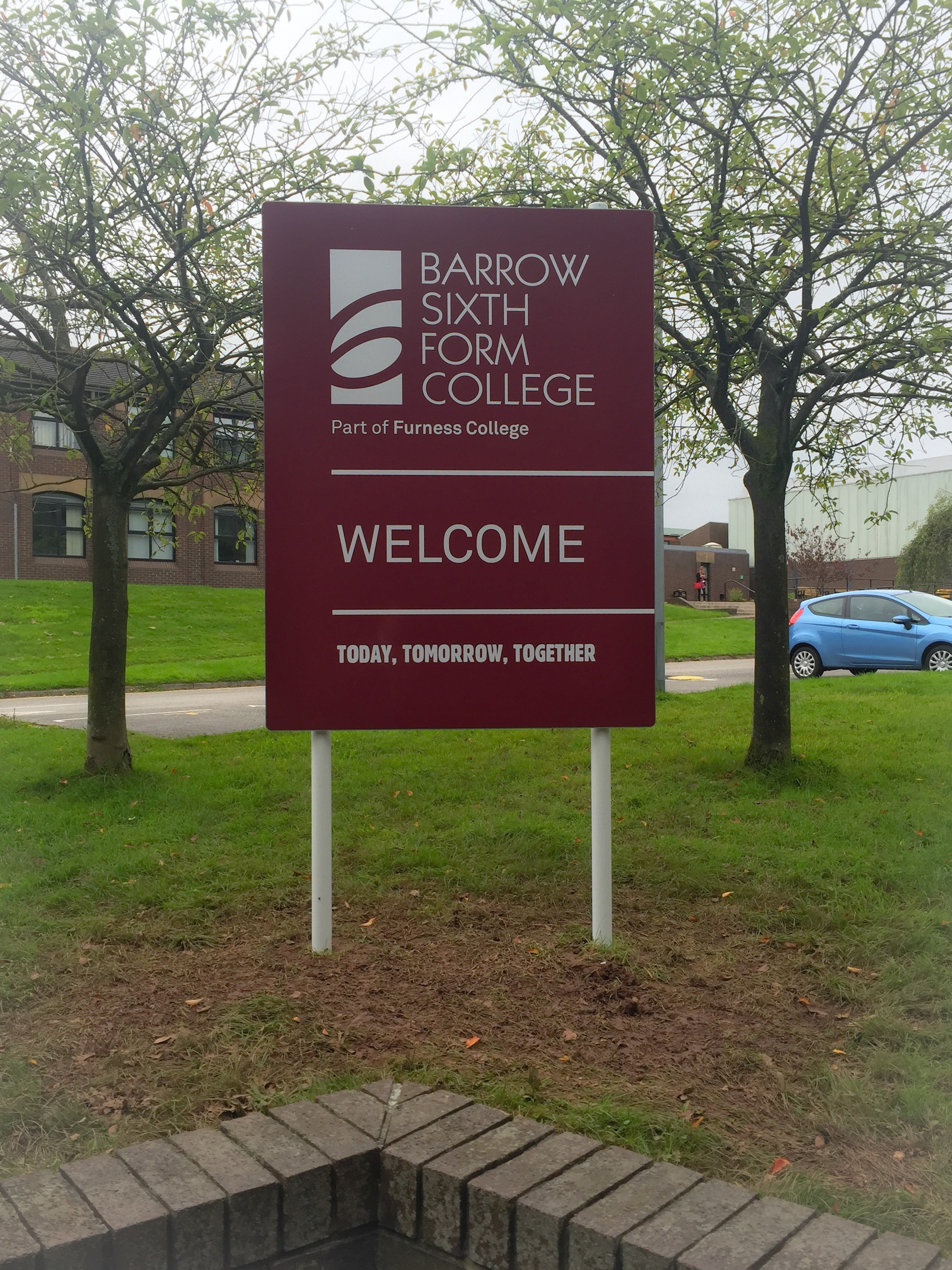
Rating Lane Campus Entrance

The Rating Lane campus is located at the north end of Rating Lane in Barrow-in-Furness. Nearby sites include Furness Abbey, Furness General Hospital, Chetwynde School, St. Bernard's Catholic High School and Abbey Road (the town's main central road network).

The campus was purpose built to replace existing school sixth forms in the town and it opened its doors in 1979. Plans to rebuild the campus in 2010 did not come to fruition due to the withdrawal of national college capital funding by the Learning and Skills Council (LSC). The campus has received substantial investment since the college's merger to fund, for example, upgrades to the fabric of the building, up-to-date computer equipment and a new IT network infrastructure, and cosmetic improvements around the campus. As part of the merger, the college committed to continue this investment to upgrade learning facilities. The Rating Lane campus is one of two of Furness College's campuses, the other being Channelside in Barrow which is located approximately 3 miles away in the centre of the town.

== Merger ==
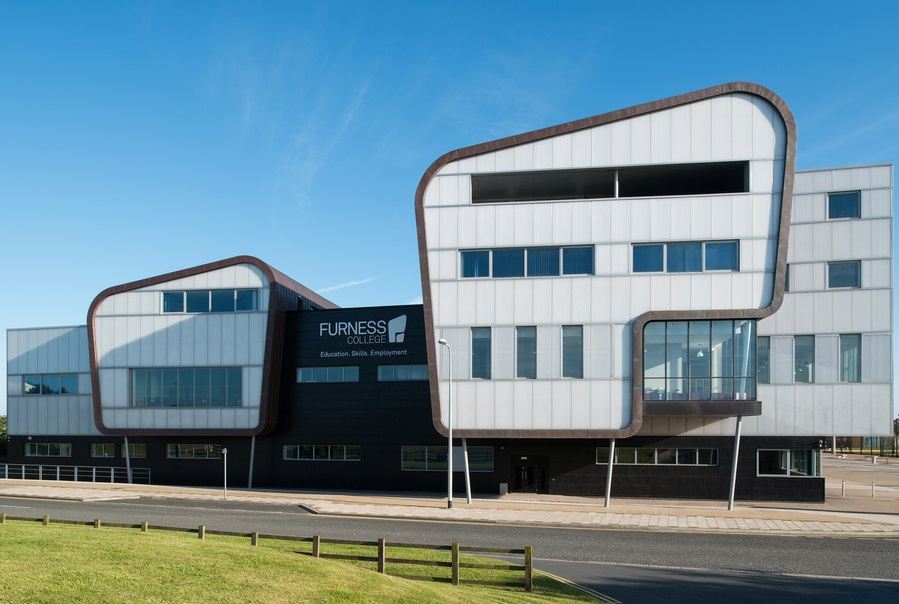
Channelside Campus

On 1 August 2016, Barrow Sixth Form College underwent a 'type B' merger with Furness College. The Sixth Form College received a financial notice to improve in January 2016 from the Education Funding Agency and was deemed no longer to be financially viable due to its inadequate financial health. As a result, merger discussions between the two colleges continued and on 1 August 2016, the corporation of Barrow Sixth Form College was dissolved and its assets and liabilities transferred to Furness College.

The college continued to operate on both campuses, which are approximately three miles apart, retaining both the Furness College and Sixth Form College brands until 2024 when the leadership team removed the Barrow Sixth Form College brand, finalising the end of Cumbria’s only sixth form college.

The majority of students in Barrow choosing to study A levels now travel to Ulverston Victoria High School which has a good Ofsted rating.

== Courses ==
Barrow Sixth Form College offers a wide range of A level courses which are predominantly studied on a full-time basis. Subject areas include:

- Sciences
- English
- Mathematics
- Humanities
- Creative and performing arts
- Modern languages
- Social sciences
- Health studies
- Sport
- Computer Science

As part of Furness College, the following courses are also offered:

- Full- and part-time courses - the college runs a large range of technical and professional courses for young people and adults, including T levels from 2021.
- Business Development - the college works with the local business community to provide bespoke training courses.
- School Leavers - a wide range of full-time courses are available from Art & Design through to Engineering, Health & Social Care, Sport and lots more.
- Apprenticeships - Furness College currently trains over 1000 apprentices and works with over 400 employers.
- Higher Education - from foundation degrees to master's degrees in a range of subject areas.

== Ofsted Inspection ==
In comparison to its strong 2019 Ofsted judgement of good under its prior leadership and principal, the college, in 2024, was judged to be inadequate, the only further education college in England to have this judgement at the time of the inspection.

== Student Union ==
The Furness College Students' Union is affiliated to the National Union of Students, and students of all Furness College campuses are entitled to membership. The college also offers extensive academic and pastoral support to all its students.

== Leadership and Management ==
The College is led by the senior leadership team under the direction and scrutiny of the Board of the Corporation which is also responsible for overseeing the strategic direction of the college. The Chair of Governors is Gary Lovatt and Nicola Cove is the Principal and Chief Executive of Furness College, including Barrow Sixth Form College.

== Notable alumni ==
- Steve Dixon - Newsreader (Weekend anchor on Sky News)
- Ade Gardner - Rugby league player (St. Helens and Great Britain)
- Karen Taylor - Comedian (finalist in the Daily Telegraph Open Mic Award, and has own sketch)
- Cat Smith - MP for Lancaster and Fleetwood
- Liam Livingstone - Professional cricketer for Lancashire CCC
