= CGP =

CGP may refer to:

- Certified Geriatric Pharmacist, a professional certification from the Commission for Certification in Geriatric Pharmacy
- Certified Group Psychotherapist (CGP), a professional certification from the International Board for Certification of Group Psychotherapists, American Group Psychotherapy Association (AGPA)
- CGP (publisher) (Coordination Group Publications), a textbook publishing company
- CGP Grey, a YouTuber and podcaster
  - CGP Grey, a penguin at Bristol Zoo, named after the above
- Shah Amanat International Airport (IATA airport code: CGP) in Chittagong, Bangladesh
- Computervision Graphics Processor or CGP
- Cartesian Genetic Programming, a form of genetic programming
- Canadian Grand Prix
- Certified Guitar Player or CGP, a fanciful title that Chet Atkins bestowed on his favorite guitarists
- C.G.P., an album by Chet Atkins
- cGP, Cyclic glycine-proline (cGP)
- Cooperstown Graduate Program
