= Victor Chavez (businessman) =

British businessman (born 1963)

Victor Manuel Chavez CBE (born 19 January 1963) is the Chief Executive of Thales UK, a main electronics and defence company in the UK. Thales UK employs around 7,500 people.

== Early life ==
Born in Barrow-in-Furness, Chavez was educated at Barrow Grammar School for Boys, after which he gained a degree in physics from the University of York in 1984. From the University of Surrey he gained an MSc in Satellite Engineering & Telecommunications in 1993.

== Career ==
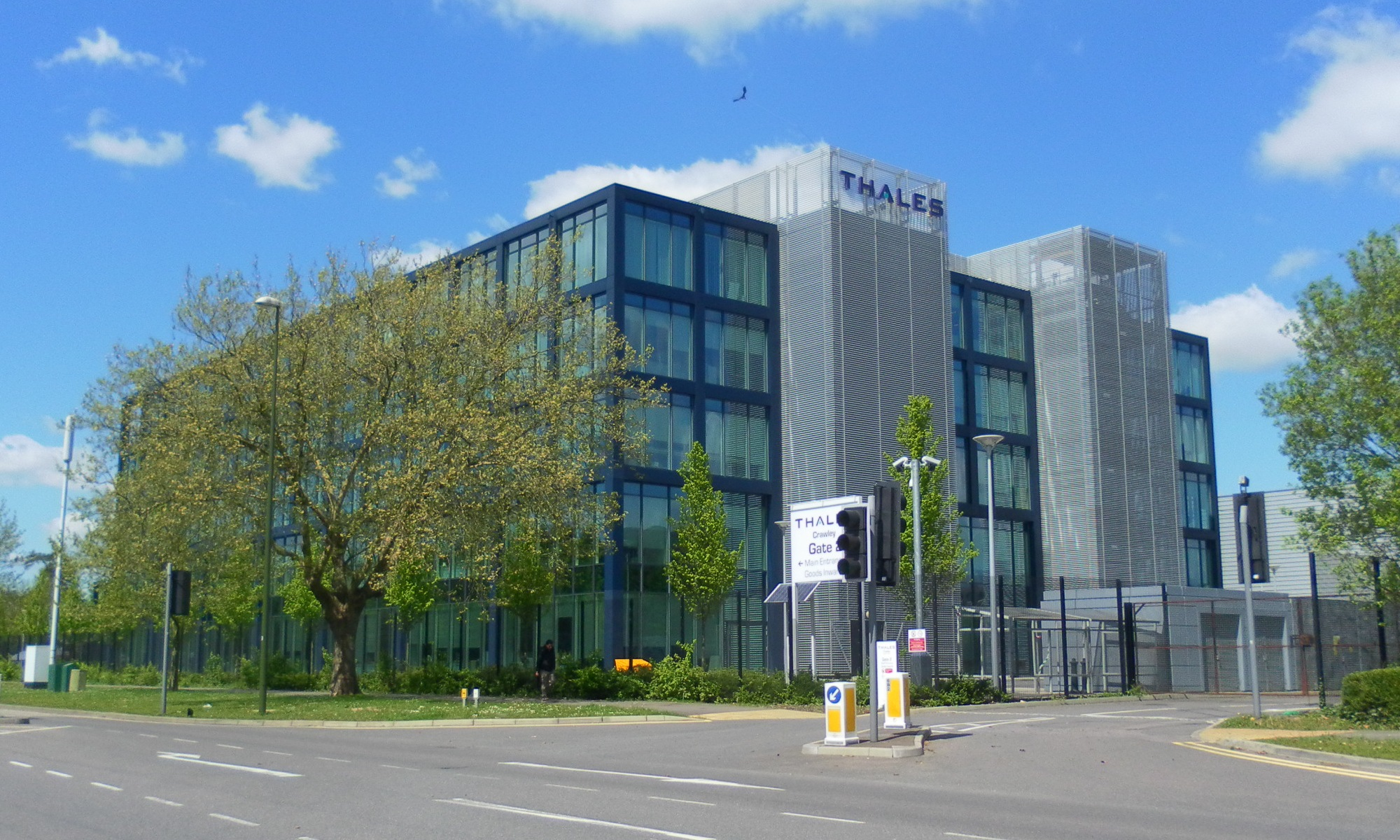
Thales in Crawley in May 2012

=== Thales ===
He joined the company in 1999. He became Chief Executive of Thales UK (Thales Holdings UK) on 1 January 2011. He had been Deputy Chief Executive for three years previously. Thales UK is involved in sonar, radar, and avionics. It makes most of the UK's aircraft simulators in Crawley in West Sussex. Thales Air Defence in Belfast makes helicopter-launched missiles. Thales has 67,000 employees in 56 countries.

He is a board member of techUK (trade association) and EngineeringUK (previously the Engineering and Technology Board). He is a co-chairman of the Information Economy Council.

== Personal life ==
He was appointed a CBE in the 2015 New Year Honours. He grew up in Barrow-in-Furness, and now lives in Hampshire. He married in September 1992 in Cumbria, and has two daughters, born June 1994 and May 1997.

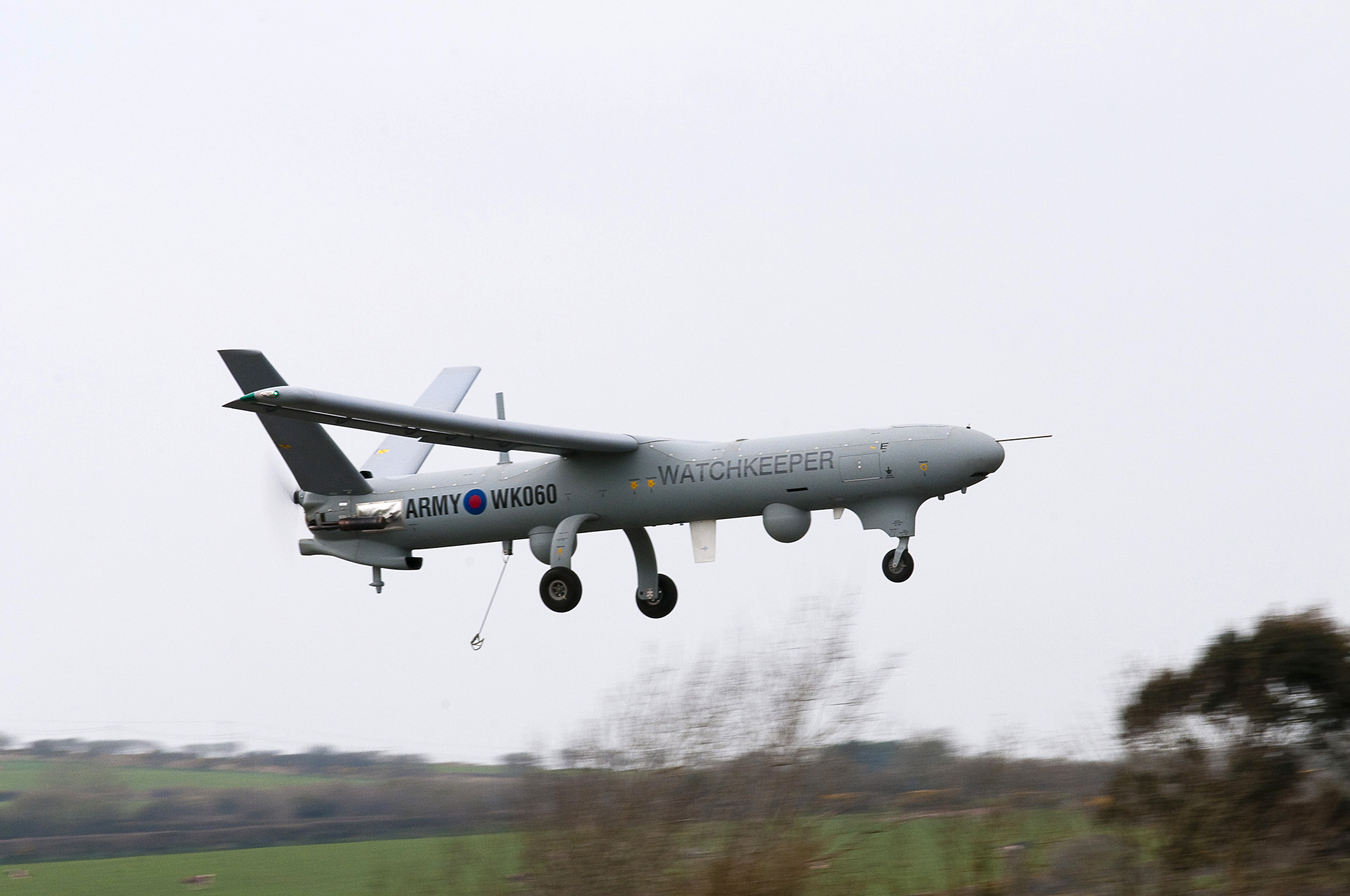
First flight of the Thales Watchkeeper WK450 in April 2010 in Wales

== See also ==
- Ian King, Chief Executive of BAE Systems since September 2008
- UK cyber security community
- Centre national de la recherche scientifique

Business positions
| Preceded by Alex Dorrian | Chief Executive of Thales UK; January 2011 - | Incumbent |
