= Liam Harrison (rugby league) =

Ireland international rugby league footballer

Personal information
- Full name: Liam James Harrison
- Born: 3 December 1983 (age 42) Barrow-in-Furness, Cumbria, England

Playing information

Rugby union
Club
Years	Team	Pld	T	G	FG	P
	North Walsham R.F.C.

Rugby league
- Position: Centre, Second-row
Club
Years	Team	Pld	T	G	FG	P
2006–18	Barrow Raiders	305	122	1	0	490
Representative
Years	Team	Pld	T	G	FG	P
2006–09	Ireland	2	1	0	0	4
2006–07	Cumbria	2	2	0	0	8
- Education: Chetwynde School
- Relatives: Ben Harrison (brother); John Cunningham (uncle)

Liam Harrison (born 3 December 1983) is a former professional rugby league and rugby union footballer who played in the 2000s and 2010s. He played representative level rugby league (RL) for Ireland and Cumbria, and at club level for Barrow Island ARLFC (in Barrow Island, Barrow-in-Furness) and Barrow Raiders, with whom he spent his whole professional rugby league career, as a wing, centre, second-row or loose forward, and club level rugby union (RU) for North Walsham R.F.C. (in North Walsham, Norfolk).

== Background ==
Liam Harrison was born in Barrow-in-Furness, Cumbria, England, he was a pupil at Chetwynde School, and he is the older brother of the rugby league footballer; Ben Harrison.

== Playing career ==
Harrison joined his hometown club in 2005, having previously played for local amateur team Barrow Island. Harrison played with Barrow during several promotions and relegations between the Championship and League 1, the highlight of his time being Barrow's victory in the 2009 Championship, when Harrison was named in the league's team of the year. He reached 300 appearances for the Raiders in 2016, and retired at the end of the 2016 season. His testimonial match was held in Barrow between a Cumbrian XIII selected by Harrison, and the Scotland national team.

He is a former Ireland international, and has represented Cumbria against Tonga, and the United States as well as playing in the Rugby Union Counties Final at Twickenham.
