= Barrow Grammar Schools =

English former grammar schools

Coordinates: 54°06′40″N 003°13′34″W

The Barrow Grammar Schools were two adjacent single-sex education schools in Barrow-in-Furness, Lancashire (now Cumbria), England during the 20th century. Both schools merged in 1979 to form the co-educational Parkview Community College of Technology. Parkview School itself was merged in 2012 with Thorncliffe School and Alfred Barrow School to form Furness Academy. Parkview School and all elements of the former Grammar Schools were demolished in 2014 with a new school building for Furness Academy being constructed in the playing fields of Parkview.

The fictional detective Inspector Charles Parker was said in Dorothy L Sayers's Clouds of Witness to have been educated here.

== History ==
=== Barrow Boys and Girls Grammar Schools ===
The schools included Barrow Boys Grammar School which opened in 1930 and Barrow Girls Grammar School in 1932. 186 students from Barrow Boys Grammar School died during combat in World War I and II and are commemorated on plaques in Furness Academy. Alumni of the grammar schools are known as 'Old Barrovians'

The boys had a school song:

Autumn gold and winter weather, summer due and bluebell spring, days afoot in Furness heather, these I know, these

are mine, these are part of me till I. perish. Westaway the seas lie open, east away the sun rides high, outward bound in morning glory, free and ready here am I.

=== Parkview School ===
Parkview Community College of Technology (or simply Parkview School) took over the former grammar school buildings naming the boys school Fraser Building and the girls school Auld Building. Both buildings were connected via the a new sports department and sports hall, while an extension to Fraser Building included Parkview's technology faculty. In 1979 Up to 2009, Parkview was Barrow's largest school in terms of pupil numbers and land area, with around 1,000 pupils attending the school. The last acting headteacher of Parkview School was Robert Swales after replacing Enid Fraser.

=== Disestablishment ===
2012 saw the establishment of Furness Academy which utilised the buildings of Parkview School for one academic year. It was named the 'South Site' as a number of students remained based in Thorncliffe School ('North Site'). Plans were drawn up for a state-of-the-art school building for Furness Academy, leaving the Parkview School buildings redundant. A common misconception was that the former grammar school buildings held listed status and were immune from major development. Ultimately demolition of the complex commenced in 2014 with property developers Mullberry Homes planning 64 large family homes on the site. In September 2014 during the demolition process, a major fire broke out in the former Auld Building of Parkview School (the original Girls Grammar School), an arson investigation was launched as a result.

== Notable alumni ==
Barrow-in-Furness Grammar School for Boys

- Chris Blackhurst
- Philip Martin Brown
- Glenn Cornick
- Gordon Fallows
- Jack Lewis, Baron Lewis of Newnham
- Dave Myers
- Ivor Porter
- Richard Reeves
- Joseph Stenhouse
- Gary Stevens
- Victor Chavez (businessman)

Barrow-in-Furness Grammar School for Girls

- Philippa Russell

Parkview School

== See also ==
- List of schools in Barrow-in-Furness
- Furness Academy
