= Ade Gardner =

English rugby league footballer

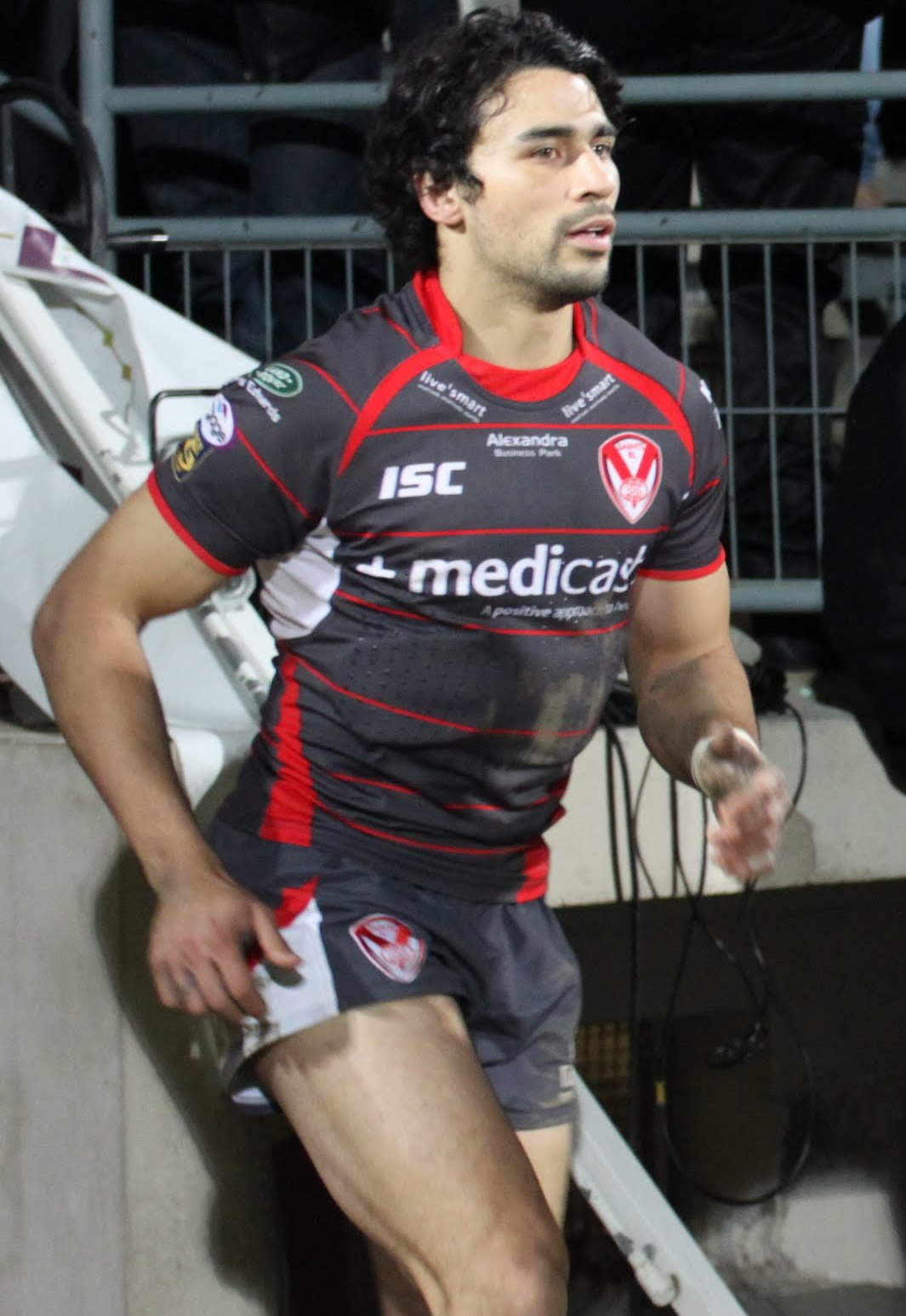

Personal information
- Full name: Adrian Antonio Gardner
- Born: 24 June 1983 (age 42) Barrow-in-Furness, Cumbria, England

Playing information
- Height: 6 ft 2 in (1.88 m)
- Weight: 14 st 11 lb (94 kg)
- Position: Wing
Club
Years	Team	Pld	T	G	FG	P
2000–01	Barrow Raiders	30	16	0	0	64
2002–14	St Helens	286	173	0	0	692
2013(loan)	→ Whitehaven	1	0	0	0	0
2014(loan)	→ Whitehaven	1	1	0	0	4
2014(loan)	→ Hull Kingston Rovers	19	8	0	0	32
	Total	337	198	0	0	792
Representative
Years	Team	Pld	T	G	FG	P
2002–03	England A	6	5	0	0	20
2003	Cumbria	1	0	0	0	0
2005–08	England	5	2	0	0	8
2006–07	Great Britain	5	3	0	0	12
- Education: St. Bernard's Catholic High School
- Relatives: Mat Gardner (brother)

Adrian Antonio Gardner (born 24 June 1983) is an English former professional rugby league footballer, who spent the vast majority of his career with St Helens in the Super League. He was an England and Great Britain representative winger.

He began his career at his home town club, Barrow Raiders, and after 11 years at St Helens, ended his playing days with a season loan move to Hull Kingston Rovers.

== Early and personal life ==
Born in Barrow-in-Furness, Gardner is the elder brother of ex-Salford City Reds wing, Mat Gardner. He is of Brazilian descent through his mother. Gardner attended St. Bernard's Catholic High School in Barrow, and played junior rugby league for Barrow Island.

== Career ==
Gardner debuted for his hometown professional club, Barrow Raiders, in July 2000. The following season, he scored 16 tries for the club in the Northern Ford Premiership. In October 2001, he signed a three-year contract with Super League club St Helens.

Gardner made his Super League début in a match against the London Broncos on 28 March 2002, which St. Helens lost. Having won Super League VI, St. Helens contested the 2003 World Club Challenge against 2002 NRL Premiers, the Sydney Roosters. Gardner played on the wing in Saints' 38–0 loss. He established himself as a first team regular in 2003 and has now appeared 281 times for St Helens, scoring 167 tries. Gardner played for St Helens on the wing in their 2006 Challenge Cup Final victory against Huddersfield Giants. Gardner also finished the 2006 season as St. Helens leading try scorer with 29 tries in all competitions.

Gardner was named in the Great Britain training squad throughout 2006. He scored on his international début in XXXX Test match against New Zealand on 27 June 2006.

St. Helens reached the 2006 Super League Grand final to be contested against Hull FC, and Gardner played on the wing and scored a try in Saints' 26–4 victory. He was a surprise omission from the Great Britain squad for the 2006 Tri-nations. As 2006 Super League champions, St Helens faced 2006 NRL Premiers the Brisbane Broncos in the 2007 World Club Challenge. Gardner played on the wing and scored two tries in Saints' 18–14 victory.

Gardner was selected in June 2007 in a young Great Britain team named by new coach Tony Smith for their match against France at Headingley. On 25 August, he scored two tries for St. Helens at Wembley Stadium to help Saints win their 11th Challenge Cup.

He was named in the Super League Dream Team for 2008's Super League XIII season.

He played in the 2008 Super League Grand Final defeat by Leeds.

Gardner was selected for the England squad to compete in the 2008 Rugby League World Cup tournament in Australia. Group A's first match against Papua New Guinea he played on the wing and scored two tries in England's victory.

He played in the 2009 Super League Grand Final defeat by the Leeds Rhinos at Old Trafford.

In the 2014 season, Ade Gardner played on loan at Hull Kingston Rovers, scoring 8 tries in 19 appearances. On 17 May at the Etihad Stadium during the 2014 Magic Weekend, he scored 2 tries in Hull KR's 38–24 victory against Hull. 8 days later at KCOM Craven Park, he scored another 2 tries in Hull KR's 48–16 victory over the London Broncos.

== Retirement ==
In November 2014, after returning to St Helens, Gardner announced his retirement from the sport after 15 years as a professional. It had been Gardner's intention to play on till 2015, but accepted an offer to join Saints' backroom staff instead, as an Assistant Strength and Conditioning Coach.
