= John Cunningham (rugby league) =

England international rugby league footballer

Personal information
- Full name: John Cunningham
- Born: 3 March 1952 (age 74) Barrow-in-Furness, England

Playing information
- Position: Prop, Second-row, Loose forward
Club
Years	Team	Pld	T	G	FG	P
1970–75	Barrow	132+3	25	18		111
1975	Balmain Tigers	0+5	1	5	1	14
1975–80	Hull Kingston Rovers	32+5	7	0	3	24
1980–82	Workington Town	27+3	2	0	1	7
	Total	207	35	23	5	156
Representative
Years	Team	Pld	T	G	FG	P
1973–80	Cumbria	6	1	0	1	4
1975	England	2	0	0	0	0
- Relatives: Liam Harrison (nephew); Ben Harrison (nephew)

John Cunningham (born 3 March 1952) is an English former professional rugby league footballer who played in the 1970s and 1980s. He played at representative level for England and Cumbria, and at club level for Roose ARL FC, Salford 'A', Barrow, Balmain Tigers, Hull Kingston Rovers, Workington Town, Cooma Stall ions (alongside Dane Carter), and Corporation Combine ARLFC (now Hindpool Tigers ARLFC of the North West Men's League) as a prop, second-row, or loose forward.

== Background ==
John Cunningham was born in Barrow-in-Furness, Lancashire, England.

== Playing career ==
=== International honours ===
John Cunningham won caps for England while at Barrow in 1975 against France, and Wales.

=== County honours ===
John Cunningham represented Cumbria.

=== BBC2 Floodlit Trophy Final appearances ===
John Cunningham played at prop in Hull Kingston Rovers' 26–11 victory over St. Helens in the 1977–78 BBC2 Floodlit Trophy Final at Craven Park, Hull on Tuesday 13 December 1977.

=== Notable tour matches ===
John Cunningham made his début, and scored a try in Barrow's 10–14 defeat by New Zealand at Craven Park on Wednesday 4 November 1970.

=== Club career ===
John Cunningham joined Barrow in July 1970, his last match for Barrow was against Huddersfield at Craven Park on Friday 14 March 1975, he was transferred from Barrow to Hull Kingston Rovers for £6,000 on 17 July 1975 (based on increases in average earnings, this would be approximately £64,780 in 2013), he suffered several knee injuries that limited his appearances for Hull Kingston Rovers, he was transferred from Hull Kingston Rovers to Workington Town for £18,000 in 1980 (based on increases in average earnings, this would be approximately £98,020 in 2013).

== Genealogical information ==
John Cunningham is married to Julie, and is the uncle of the rugby league footballers, Liam Harrison and Ben Harrison.

== Outside of rugby league ==
John Cunningham has been the landlord of; The Derby Hotel, 246–248 Dalton Road, Barrow-In-Furness; The Furness Hotel, 13 Bath St, Barrow-In-Furness which is now named Cunningham's after him; and The Old Bank, 107–109 Duke Street, Barrow-In-Furness.
