= Ulverston Victoria High School =

Location
- Springfield Road; Ulverston, Cumbria, LA12 0EB; England; 54°11′18″N 3°05′40″W

Information
- Type: Community school
- Local authority: Westmorland and Furness
- Department for Education URN: 112385 Tables
- Ofsted: Reports
- Headteacher: Matthew Hardwick
- Gender: Coeducational
- Age: 11 to 18
- Enrolment: 1,364
- Website: http://www.uvhs.uk

Ulverston Victoria High School (UVHS) is a secondary school and sixth form located in the town of Ulverston, Cumbria, England. It is the successor school to Ulverston Grammar School and Victoria Secondary Modern, which were combined in 1967 to form Ulverston Comprehensive School. This school ultimately became UVHS.

== Admissions ==
UVHS is a comprehensive school and takes its pupils from the local area as well as from Barrow-in-Furness, Grange-over-Sands and Coniston. The school also has a Sixth Form.

== Sport ==
The school's most notable sporting achievements include winning the BSOA Large Secondary School Orienteering crown for 19 of the last 21 years. The orienteering team came back from the 2017 World Schools Orienteering Championship with a silver medal for the junior girls team and individual gold and silver medals for Year 9 pupil, Merryn Stangroom.

== Music ==
UVHS Swing Band won the national SSAT competition for function bands in 2013, headlining at the Liverpool Echo Arena. The band has recorded 2 CDs with the Royal Marines and has also appeared live on Blue Peter as well as on Classic FM, Radio 2 and Radio Cumbria. In 2018 they played at Disneyland Paris on Bastille day.

The Wind Band consists of between 90 and 100 players aged from 11 to 18. The band regularly tours abroad, including Italy, Spain, Czech Republic, Germany, Austria, France, Belgium, Luxembourg, Salzburg and the Netherlands. In 2014 they performed a live concert on Dutch TV and have also appeared live on Belgian and Spanish TV in the past as well as Czech and British radio.

Richard Butler, head of music, was awarded an MBE in the New Years Honours list 2018.

== Notable former pupils ==
(Includes Ulverston Grammar School and Victoria Secondary Modern)

- Sir Wilfred Burns CB CBE, town planner
- Richard Parsons, educational study guide author and founder and owner of CGP
- William Pearsall, Quain Professor of Botany at University College London from 1944 to 1957, President of the Institute of Biology from 1957 to 1958
- Colin Pickthall, Labour MP for West Lancashire from 1992 to 2005
- Dame Kathleen Raven, nurse, Chief Nursing Officer in the DHSS from 1958 to 1972
- Rt Rev Martin Wharton, Bishop of Newcastle since 1997
- John Eccleston, puppeteer, writer, presenter and actor
- Jess Gillam, saxophonist
- Elsie Blundell, Labour MP for Heywood and Middleton North from 2024
- Morgan Knowles, current professional rugby league player for the Dolphins

== See also ==
- Town Bank Grammar School, a defunct school in the town, the endowment of which contributed to the school's early development
