= Andrea Ashworth =

English writer and academic

- Born: 1969 (age 56–57); Manchester, England, United Kingdom
- Education: Hertford College, Oxford; Jesus College, Oxford
- Occupation: Author
- Writing career
- Language: English

Andrea Ashworth (born 1969) is an English writer and academic, known for her memoir Once in a House on Fire, which won the Somerset Maugham Award from the Society of Authors in 1999.

== Early life and education ==
Ashworth was born into a working class household in Manchester in 1969. Her father died when she was five. She studied at Xaverian College in Manchester She studied at Hertford College, Oxford, where she was a scholar. She later became a Junior Research Fellow of Jesus College, Oxford.

== Career ==
Once in a House on Fire, published in 1998, won the Somerset Maugham Award from the Society of Authors in 1999. It tells the story of her traumatic upbringing and the abuse that she suffered at the hands of her two stepfathers.

She later moved to America.

== See also ==
- List of alumni of Hertford College
- List of people from Manchester
