= Ben Harrison (rugby league) =

England and Ireland international rugby league footballer

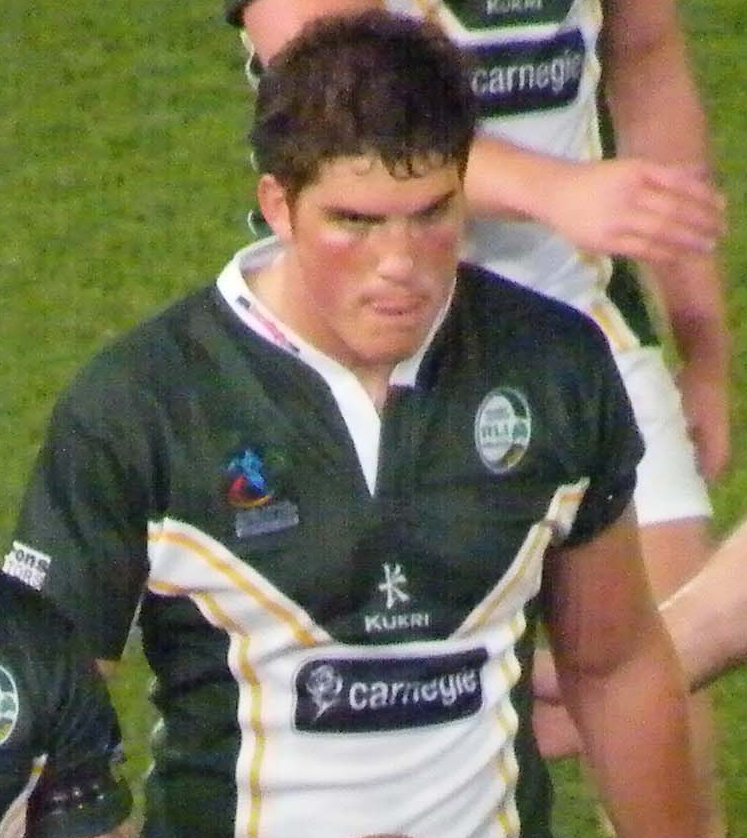

Personal information
- Full name: Benjamin Jack Harrison
- Born: 24 February 1988 (age 38) Barrow-in-Furness, Cumbria, England

Playing information
- Height: 6 ft 1 in (1.85 m)
- Weight: 16 st 3 lb (103 kg)
- Position: Loose forward, Prop, Second-row
Club
Years	Team	Pld	T	G	FG	P
2006–16	Warrington Wolves	211	19	0	0	76
2007(loan)	→ Widnes Vikings	3	0	0	0	0
2013(dr)	→ Swinton Lions	1	0	0	0	0
2016(loan)	→ Wakefield Trinity Wildcats	3	0	0	0	0
2021	Barrow Raiders	5	1	0	0	4
	Total	223	20	0	0	80
Representative
Years	Team	Pld	T	G	FG	P
2008	Ireland	3	0	0	0	0
2010–12	England	3	1	0	0	4
2011	England Knights	1	0	0	0	0
- Education: Chetwynde School
- Relatives: Liam Harrison (brother); John Cunningham (uncle)

Ben Harrison (born 24 February 1988) is a former rugby league footballer who last played as a loose forward, prop and second-row forward for the Barrow Raiders in League 1. He has played at international level for Ireland, England and the England Knights.

He previously played for the Warrington Wolves in the Super League and on loan from Warrington at the Widnes Vikings in the Championship and the Wakefield Trinity Wildcats in the Super League.

== Background ==
Ben Harrison was born in Barrow-in-Furness, Cumbria, England, he is the younger brother of the rugby league footballer; Liam Harrison, and he was a pupil, and played rugby union, at Chetwynde School in Barrow-in-Furness.

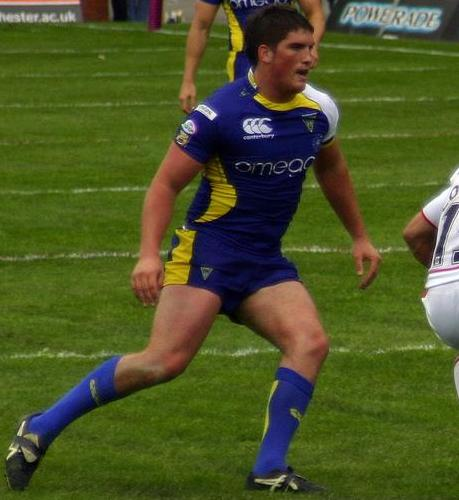
Harrison playing for the Warrington Wolves in 2008

== Playing career ==
=== Warrington Wolves ===
Harrison signed for the Warrington Wolves in 2005, he made his début for the Warrington side against the Salford City Reds, and other than two loan periods, he played his entire club career for the Warrington club.

Harrison spent a month on loan at the Widnes club during 2007.

Harrison played in Warrington's 25–16 victory over Huddersfield in the 2009 Challenge Cup Final at Wembley Stadium, London on Saturday 29 August 2009, in front of a crowd of 76,560, he played in the 30–6 victory over Leeds in the 2010 Challenge Cup Final at Wembley Stadium, London on Saturday 28 August 2010, in front of a crowd of 85,217, and he played in the 35–18 victory over the Leeds club in the 2012 Challenge Cup Final at Wembley Stadium, London on Saturday 25 August 2012, in front of a crowd of 79,180.

Harrison played in Warrington's 18–26 defeat by Leeds in the 2012 Super League Grand Final at Old Trafford, Manchester on Saturday 6 October 2012, in front of a crowd of 70,676, and he played in the 16–30 defeat by Wigan in the 2013 Super League Grand Final at Old Trafford, Manchester on Saturday 5 October 2013, in front of a crowd of 66,281.

Harrison played four matches on loan at the Wakefield Trinity Wildcats during 2016.

=== Barrow Raiders ===
On 11 September 2020 it was announced that Harrison had signed with Barrow for the 2021 season

In October 2022, Harrison was served with a four-year ban for an anti-doping rule violation after testing positive for Drostanolone while training with Barrow Raiders in April 2021. The ban ended in June 2025.

== International ==
Ben Harrison represented Ireland in the 2008 Rugby League World Cup.
