= Philippa Russell =

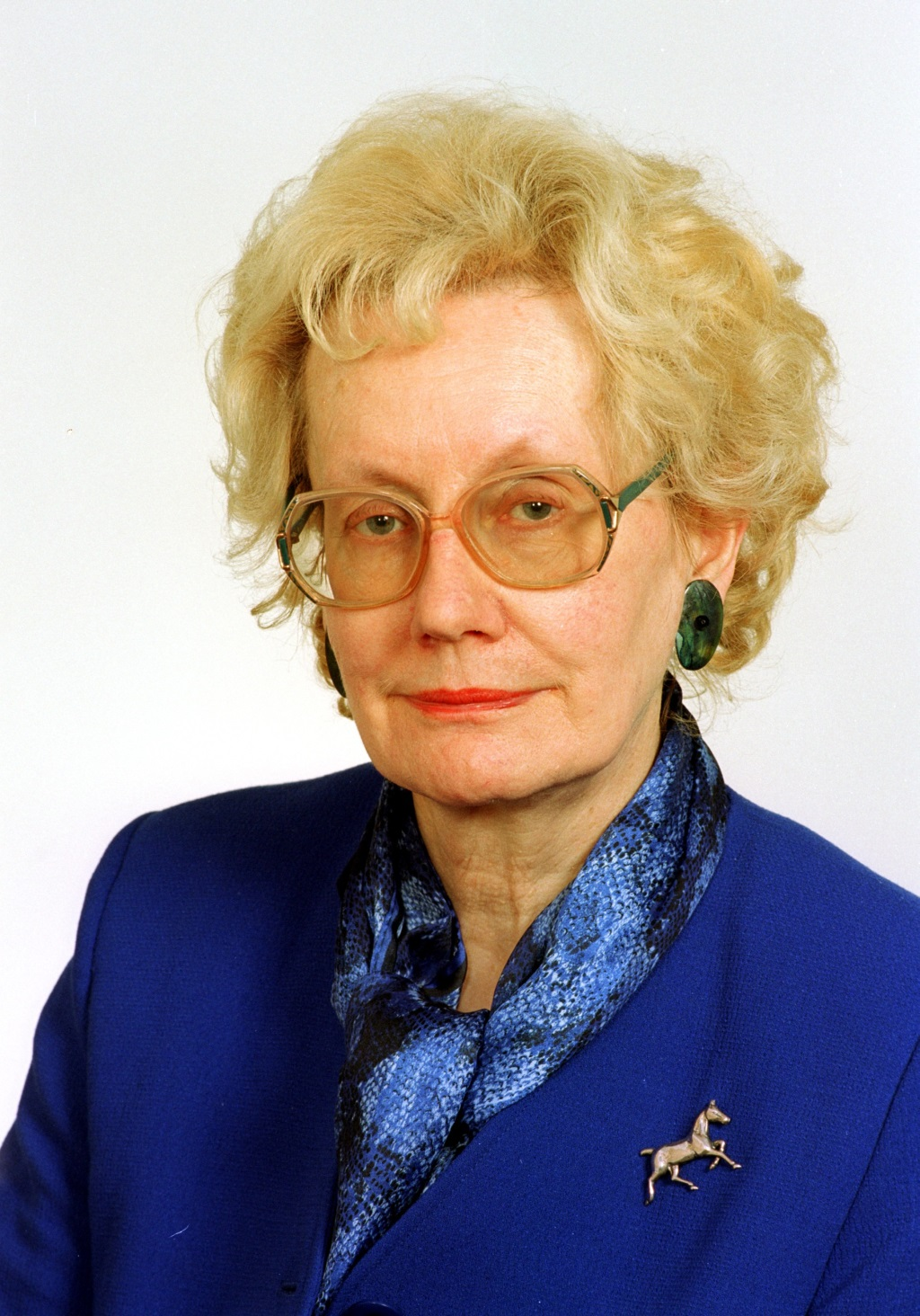
Dame Philippa Russell

Dame Philippa Margaret Russell DBE (born 4 February 1938) is a British worker and writer in the field of learning disability. She was chair of the UK government Standing Commission on Carers 2007–15.

== Career ==
Philippa Margaret Russell was educated at Barrow-in-Furness Grammar School for Girls and St Hilda's College, Oxford. She worked for the Council for Children's Welfare 1968–76 before being director of the Council for Disabled Children 1976–2003. She was disability adviser to the National Children's Bureau 2003–07 and to the Department for Education and Skills 2003–05. She was a commissioner of the Disability Rights Commission from 2002 until its abolition in 2007. In 2007 she was appointed chair of the Standing Commission on Carers, "an independent advisory body providing expert advice to Ministers and the Carers Strategy Cross-Government Programme Board on progress in delivering the strategic vision of the national Carers Strategy."

== Honours ==
Philippa Russell was appointed OBE in 1998, advanced to CBE in 2001 and made a Dame as a DBE in the Queen's Birthday Honours of 2009 "for services to Disabled Children, Young People and Family Carers." She has honorary degrees from the University of Lincoln, the University of York and King Alfred's College, Winchester. She is an honorary fellow of the University of Central Lancashire. Philippa Russell is also an honorary fellow of John Moores University in Liverpool, awarded on 15 July 2015

== Publications ==
- The education act 1981 : the role of the named person, National Children's Bureau, London, 1983
- The wheelchair child, Souvenir Press, London, 1989. ISBN 0285650734
- Positive choices : services for children with disabilities living away from home, National Children's Bureau, London, 1995. ISBN 1874579849
- Having a say! : disabled children and effective partnership in decision making, Council for Disabled Children, London, 1998
