= Richard Parsons (author) =

English teacher and author of study guides (born 1966)

- Born: 1966 (age 59–60)
- Education: University of Oxford
- Occupations: Writer, publisher, and businessman
- Spouse: K. Parsons
- Children: 2
- Writing career
- Language: English
- Genre: Non-fiction - education
- Website: www.cgpbooks.co.uk

Richard Parsons (born 1966) of Broughton-in-Furness, Cumbria, England, is a former teacher and the author of a series of best-selling GCSE study guides. In a league table of the top UK authors, by number of books sold, compiled by The Bookseller magazine, for the period 2000–2009, he ranked fifth.

Dissatisfied with the quality of study guides during his teaching career at Furness College, Parsons quit in 1995 and began writing his first manuscript, which was later published through his own company, Coordination Group Publications. By the end of 2009, his 600 titles had sold more than nine million books, grossing more than £48 million. Though he wrote the original books himself and they all bear his name, later books were written by other teachers. Parsons wrote the motivational book How to fulfill your wildest dreams!, which was published in 1990 by Mega-Books (Broughton-in-Furness). He also owns a petrol station and leisure centre in Broughton.

Parsons, a keen cyclist, lives in Cumbria with his wife and two children. His mother is also a former teacher, and his father was a dentist. Parsons went to Ulverston Victoria High School before gaining a First in Physics at Oxford University. On graduating, he taught mathematics at Furness College, Barrow-in-Furness.

In January 2008, Parsons donated £100,000 to the parish of Broughton and Duddon to pay for essential repairs to St Mary Magdalene and the Holy Innocents Church.

In 2019, his company, Coordination Group Publications, was valued at £120 million, giving Parsons, who owns 95%, a net worth of £114 million.
