= John Huckell =

English poet (1729–1771)

John Huckell (1729 – 1771) was an English poet.

Huckell was the son of Thomas Huckell, burgess of Stratford-upon-Avon. He was baptised there 29 December 1729. He studied at the grammar school of Stratford, matriculated at Magdalen Hall, Oxford, on 8 April 1747, proceeded B.A. 11 March 1751, and 'was presented to the curacy of Hounslow, Middlesex, and the chapel standing on the confines of two parishes, Heston and Isleworth.' He resided in the latter (preface to Avon), and on his death was buried there, 20 September 1771.

Huckell wrote:

- 'Avon; a Poem, in three parts.' The first edition was published in 1758, 'being printed in quarto at Birmingham in an elegant manner by the celebrated Baskerville' (preface to Avon). A new edition was published at Stratford-upon-Avon in 1811.
- 'An Epistle to David Garrick, Esq., on his being presented with the Freedom of Stratford-upon-Avon; and on the Jubilee held there to the Memory of Shakespeare in September 1769 '
