= Arthur Mayo (VC) =

Recipient of the Victoria Cross

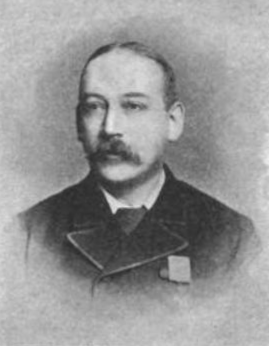
- Born: 18 May 1840; Oxford, England
- Died: 18 May 1920 (aged 80); Boscombe, Bournemouth, England
- Burial place: East Cemetery, Boscombe
- Military career
- Allegiance: United Kingdom
- Branch: Royal Navy; Indian Navy
- Rank: Midshipman
- Conflicts: Indian Mutiny
- Awards: Victoria Cross

Arthur Mayo VC (18 May 1840 – 18 May 1920) was an English recipient of the Victoria Cross, the highest and most prestigious award for gallantry in the face of the enemy that can be awarded to British and Commonwealth forces.

== Details ==
Arthur Mayo was educated at Berkhamsted School and, following his naval career, at Magdalen Hall, now Hertford College, Oxford.

He was 17 years old, and a midshipman in the Indian Navy's naval brigade during the Indian Mutiny when the following deed took place on 22 November 1857 at Dacca, India for which he was awarded the VC:

Indian Navy, Midshipman Arthur Mayo: For having headed the charge on the 22nd of November, 1857, in the engagement between the Indian Naval Brigade and the mutineers of the 73rd Native Infantry, and Bengal Artillery, when the former was ordered to charge 2 sixpounders which were keeping up a heavy fire. Mr. Mayo was nearly 20 yards in front of anyone else during the advance.

He died in Bournemouth on his 80th birthday.
