= Chetwynde School =

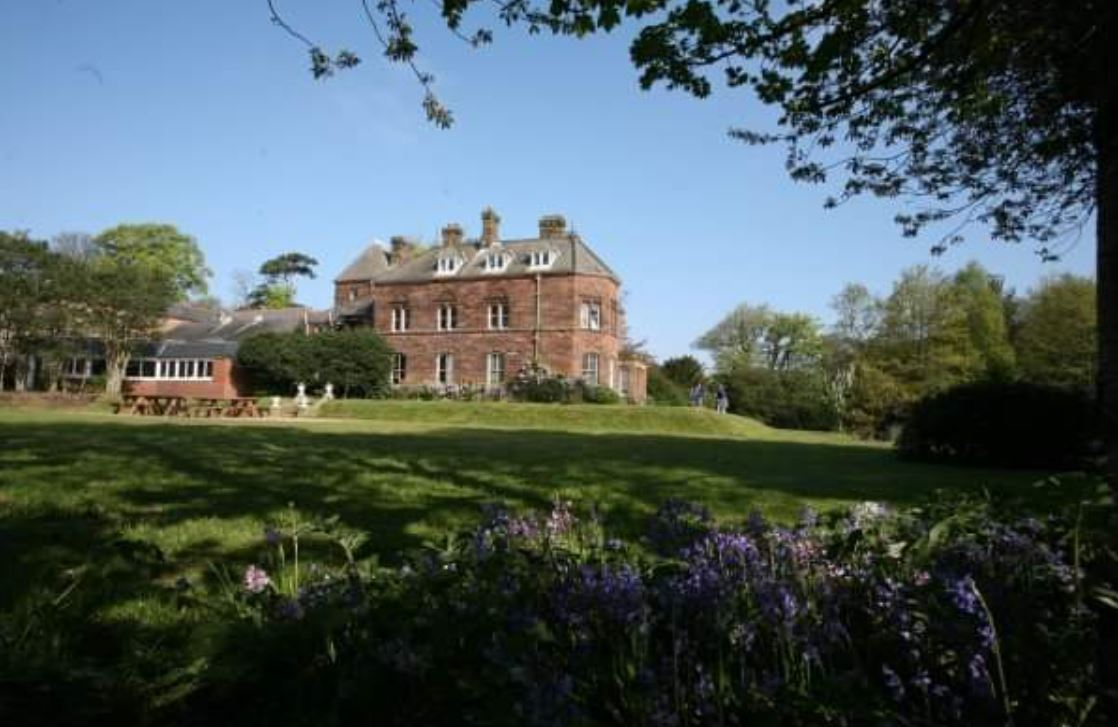

Location
- Croslands; Rating Lane; Barrow-in-Furness, Cumbria, LA13 0NY; England; 54.13121°N 3.20655°W

Information
- Type: Free school
- Established: 1938
- Local authority: Westmorland and Furness
- Department for Education URN: 141106 Tables
- Ofsted: Reports
- Chair of Local Governing Body: John Burgess
- Chief Executive Officer and Executive Head Teacher: Andrew Wren
- Head Teacher: Stephen Jefferson
- Staff: 86
- Gender: Coeducational
- Age: 3 to 16
- Enrolment: 500~
- Website: www.chetwynde.co.uk

Chetwynde School is a Free school in Barrow-in-Furness, Cumbria, England. It includes a kindergarten, primary school and secondary school. It is a member of South Cumbria Multi-Academy Trust.

Founded as a private primary school, it was known as Our Lady's Chetwynde School and Chetwynde Convent Preparatory School at different periods of its history before it expanded to being a coeducational independent school for children aged 3 to 18. Before 2014 it was Barrow's only independent school and the only one in the town which educated children from nursery all the way to sixth form. The school became a state-funded free school in September 2014 for pupils aged 4–16 years.

== History ==
Chetwynde was founded as Our Lady's Chetwynde School in 1938 by Sister Aquinas and her nuns as a girls' school. In 1976, the school became mixed and independent from the church, though it retained its Catholic faith and ethos. Under Margaret Stones, the school's first headteacher, Chetwynde achieved high levels of sporting and academic success. The next headteacher was Isobel Nixon; during her time as headmistress the school dropped the "Our Lady's" prefix from its title and the school's record of high academic and extra-curricular achievement was maintained. New laboratories were built with the help of the John Fisher Foundation and many other modernisations took place.

It was initially a junior school for children up to age 11. In 1984, the age range was extended to 16. By then the school had outgrown its premises on Abbey Road and moved to its current site. The Sixth Form was opened in 1989. The first male headteacher, Russell Collier, was appointed in 2010. From 2014 to 2019, the headteacher of Chetwynde School was Ms Sian Jeffreys, and as of September 2019 onwards, the current headteacher is Mr Stephen Jefferson.

On 25 May 2012, it was announced that the school would remain open in September after an eleventh hour purchase from a currently unnamed purchaser. The school remained under the leadership of the headmaster Russell Collier with a new board of governors, the majority from the Chetwynde Support Group (CSG). The school began to offer new bursary programs to make it more accessible to the local community and to increase enrollment.

== Free school application ==
On 8 November 2012, in a meeting held between governors and parents, it was announced that the school intended to apply for free school status beginning in September 2014, as based on pupil numbers the school's long-term future was in doubt. The application was processed by January 2013, with a decision from the Department of Education to be made by May 2013. Initial reception from parents was extremely positive and Chetwynde asked parents in the area to register their interest in order to aid the school's application. On 22 May 2013, Chetwynde announced that it had been successful in its application and became Cumbria's first free school in September 2014.

In 2018, the school closed its sixth form due to low student numbers. Students now generally attend Barrow Sixth Form College located on the opposite side of Rating Lane to the school.

== Multi-academy trust ==
Under pressure from the Department for Education through the issuing of a financial notice to improve, Chetwynde School began to seek a multi-academy trust to join. On 1 September 2021, the school joined South Cumbria Multi-Academy Trust, a local trust formed to improve education in South Cumbria. The school has now demonstrated sound finances and has had its financial notice to improve removed.

== Academics ==
Chetwynde is consistently ranked as one of the county's top non-selective schools. In the 2011 GCSEs, pupils achieved a 100% pass rate with all gaining at least five "A*" to "C" grades, making Chetwynde the best school in Cumbria for GCSE results. That same year it also achieved the best A-level results in Cumbria, with 86% of grades at "A*" to "B".

In 2013, Chetwynde School Sixth Form maintained its 100% A-Level pass rate for the fourth consecutive year. In the same year, 96% of Chetwynde's GCSE students achieved five or more A* to C grades.

== Sport ==
In sport, the school has competitive rugby union, football, cricket, hockey, tennis, cross country running, basketball, and athletics teams. It is most notable for success in netball and swimming.

Chetwynde is known for its highly successful swimming team. The school has achieved a number of national titles, being the only school to have won medals at every English National Schools' Primary Championship since their inauguration in 1995. They have represented England in international tournaments.

Chetwynde has a formidable record in netball and it remains a popular sport with pupils. During the 1980s and 1990s, its teams dominated the English Schools Netball Association Championship.

Cricket has also been a rising success for Chetwynde, as in the summer of 2018, Chetwynde's U13 and U15 Cricket team managed to reach 3rd and 4th place in the Cumbria County Schools Cup respectively.

== Notable former pupils ==
- Ben Palmer - Director of The Inbetweeners Movie
- Ben Harrison - Super League Rugby league player, winner of the Challenge Cup with Warrington Wolves.
- Liam Harrison - Rugby League player who played for Barrow Raiders and Ireland
- Matt Bowes - Swimmer who won a silver medal in the Men's 4 × 100 metre medley relay with England at the 2006 Commonwealth Games
- Liam Livingstone - English Cricketer (batsman) and former captain of the Lancashire T20 Domestic side.
- Nikhil Rathi - CEO of Financial Conduct Authority (FCA)
