= Furness Academy =

Location
- Park Drive; Barrow-in-Furness, Cumbria, LA13 9BB; England; 54°07′05″N 3°12′49″W

Information
- Type: Academy
- Motto: At the heart of the Barrow Community
- Established: 2009
- Local authority: Westmorland and Furness
- Specialist: STEM and Sport
- Department for Education URN: 135940 Tables
- Ofsted: Reports
- Gender: Co-educational
- Age: 11 to 16
- Enrolment: 1150
- Colour
- Website: http://www.furnessacademy.co.uk/

Furness Academy is a secondary school in Barrow-in-Furness, England. It is the fourth academy to have been formed in the county of Cumbria after the closure of Alfred Barrow School, Parkview Community College of Technology and Thorncliffe School in 2009. Having utilised numerous buildings of the former Parkview and Thorncliffe Schools since 2009, a single £22 million building opened in the Parkside area of the town in September 2013.

Since opening, Furness Academy has gained a somewhat tarnished reputation from having the highest exclusion rate in England (between 2009 and 2010), and a number of Ofsted reports that judged it as inadequate. The 2012 report led to the academy unsuccessfully challenging Ofsted in the High Court, and the 2013 report led to the school's being placed in 'special measures' and the suspension of the academy's principal.

The school was successfully moved out of special measures in 2015. It also celebrated its best ever GCSE results in summer 2015.

In 2019, Furness Academy successfully merged with the Inspired Learning Trust, to form Furness Education Trust. This multi academy Trust comprises Furness Academy, Parkside Academy, Victoria Academy, Yarlside Academy and South Cumbria School Direct.

== Academy history ==
Furness Academy was formed after a public consultation by Cumbria County Council following concerns over the falling number of pupils, educational standards and performance and out-of-date school facilities in the town. The decision was then made to establish an Academy to replace Alfred Barrow School, Parkview Community College of Technology and Thorncliffe School. The academy's sponsor is BAE Systems.

Despite numerous protests by students and concerned parents alike and a 6,000 signature petition presented to Cumbria County Council, the academy was given the go-ahead in 2009 and hundreds of Alfred Barrow students were uprooted and moved to the Furness Academy North Site (Formerly Thorncliffe) or South Site (Formerly Parkview) Furness Academy's eight departments include: English and Literacy, Maths and Numeracy, Physical Education and Sport Science, Technology, Personal and Social Development, Modern Foreign Languages, Humanities and Religious and Moral Education.

=== Evolution of Furness Academy ===
Barrow Higher Grade School and both the segregated and coeducational Alfred Barrow Schools were located within a Grade II listed building on Duke Street, a large wing of which became St.George's Church of England Primary School in September 2011. The building which Barrow-in-Furness Technical School formerly occupied was renamed the Nan Tait Centre in the early 2000s and now serves as a media and arts centre as well as general office complex. One predecessor of Parkview Community College of Technology; Risedale School has been completely demolished and an Aldi supermarket now stands on the site.

| Barrow Higher Grade School (1880–1930) | Alfred Barrow Boys School (1930–1979) | Alfred Barrow School (1979–2009) | Furness Academy (2009–Present) |
| Barrow Higher Grade School (1880–1930) | Alfred Barrow Girls School (1930–1979) | Alfred Barrow School (1979–2009) | Furness Academy (2009–Present) |
| | Barrow Boys Grammar School (1930–1979) | Parkview Community College of Technology (1979–2009) | Furness Academy (2009–Present) |
| | Barrow Girls Grammar School (1932–1979) | Parkview Community College of Technology (1979–2009) | Furness Academy (2009–Present) |
| | Risedale School | Parkview Community College of Technology (1979–2009) | Furness Academy (2009–Present) |
| Barrow Technical School (1903–1970) | | Thorncliffe School (1970–2009) | Furness Academy (2009–Present) |

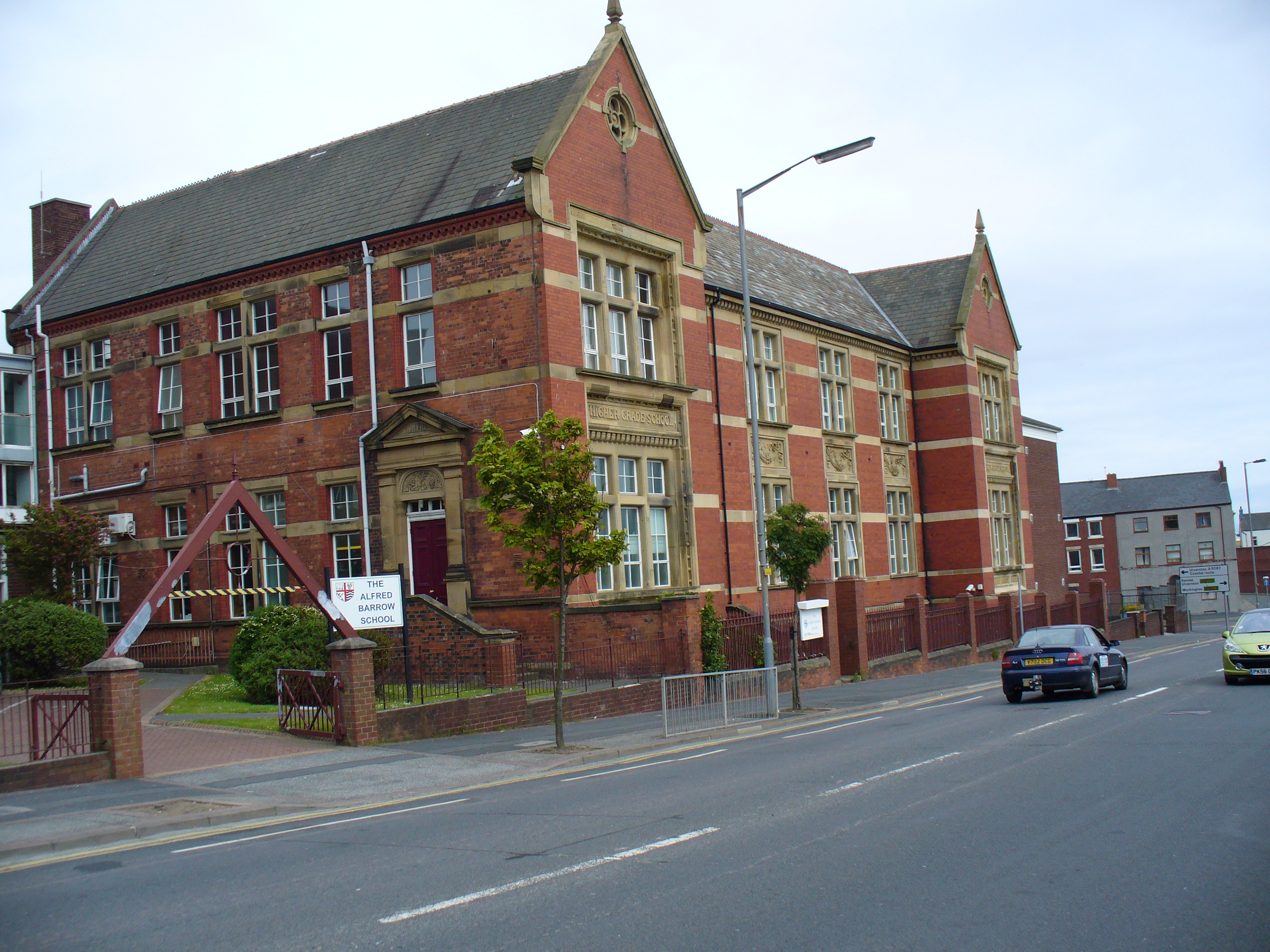
Barrow Higher Grade School/Alfred Barrow School
(Grade II listed)

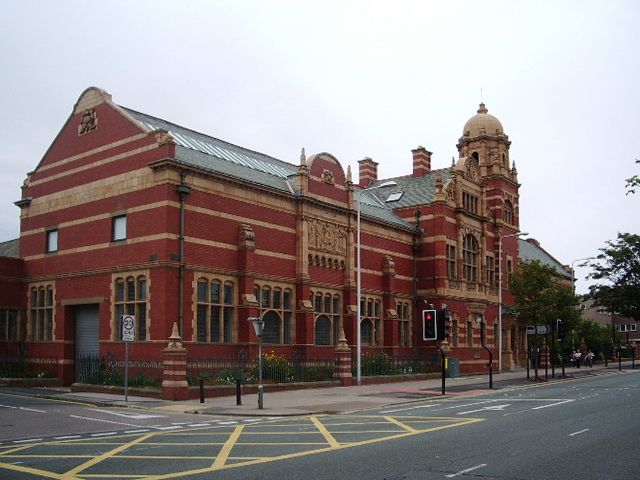
Barrow Technical School
(Grade II listed)

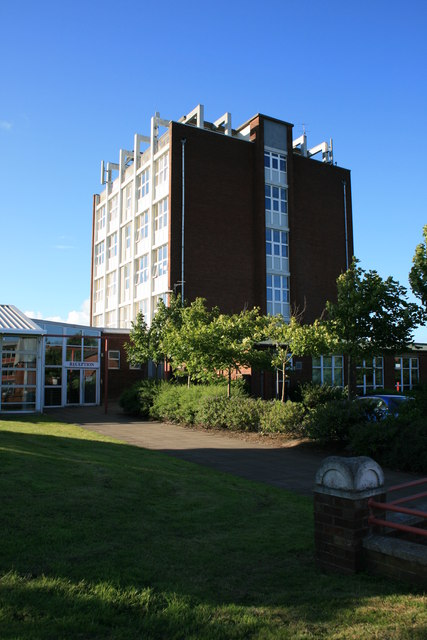
Thorncliffe School

=== 2009–2013: North and South Sites ===
Since 2009 Furness Academy occupied the former buildings of Thorncliffe and Parkview Schools which were named the North and South Site respectively. A new multimillion-pound academy building on the South Site was completed in 2013. A year later the former school buildings were demolished to make way for 114 new homes.

Furness Academy North Site (54.1299°N 3.2219°W) The North Site was located on Thorncliffe Road on the border of the Hawcoat and Ormsgill wards and occupied the buildings that were formerly Thorncliffe School. The school was built in 1970 and upon closure had some 765 students. The former school buildings are due to be demolished and the extensive grounds redeveloped into 50 homes.

Furness Academy South Site (54.1207°N 3.2133°W)

The South Site was located at the bottom of West Avenue in the Parkside ward and occupied the buildings that were formerly Parkview School. The two main buildings of Furness Academy South Site were built in 1930s as Barrow Boys Grammar School and Barrow Girls Grammar School The twin grammar schools were closed in the late 1970s and were replaced by a new comprehensive school called Parkview Community College of Technology operating from the old Grammar school buildings which was created with the additional closure of the adjacent Risedale Secondary Modern school. Demolition of the complex took place in 2014 with 64 large family homes planned for the site.

=== 2013–Onwards: New academy building ===
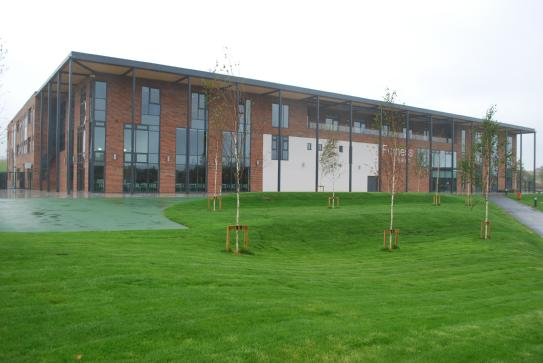
Furness Academy's newbuild seen from Park Drive in September 2013

Originally the student population at Furness Academy stood at over 1,700, although this dropped to just over 1,000 in 2013. A new state-of the-art academy building to accommodate these students was proposed since the conception of the academy itself, planning permission for the £22 million building was submitted to Cumbria County Council in January 2011 who in turn approved the application in March 2011. The new complex will is located solely at the original 'South Site' in the southern part of the academy's playing fields.

Construction commenced in March 2012 after a series of delays, the most notable being the rejected application to protect land and classify the academy's playing fields as a 'Town and Village Green'. The building was completed in early September 2013 to coincide with the new school term.

== Controversies ==
Furness Academy had the highest exclusion rate in England during the period of 2009 to 2010. The first year of the academy's existence saw 1,185 temporary exclusions, 400 higher than any other in the country. Although this represents well over a half of the academy's student population it was claimed that all exclusions involved the same 2% of pupils. Over the same time period only 33% of year 11 pupils managed to pass five GCSEs including Maths and English, considerably fewer than the national average of 46% and lower still than the troubled Alfred Barrow and Thorncliffe Schools that Furness Academy replaced. This improved to 49% the following year, with a pass rate of 71% for all other subjects.

Furness Academy took Ofsted to the High Court of Justice in 2012 over what bosses believed was a 'misleading' and 'flawed' investigation into the academy. An injunction by Furness Academy to prevent the publication of Ofsted's report which labelled its effectiveness as 'inadequate' was rejected by the High Court. The 2013 Ofsted report into Furness Academy also deemed it as inadequate and requiring special measures, with principal Douglas Blackledge ultimately being suspended pending an investigation. The school's sponsors have stated "The board should now be given space to complete its investigation and produce a solid plan for the future. We all want first class results at Furness Academy to match the investment in new facilities".

February 2014 saw the resignation of Douglas Blackledge and in turn the appointment of acting head Des Herlihy as new principal. A 2014 inspection by Ofsted raised concerns about financial management and the impact of redundancies at Furness Academy, saying 'not enough progress' had taken place since their previous visit and the academy was to remain in 'special measures'. In July 2014 principal Herlihy quit his post at Furness Academy, citing 'health issues'. Vice principal Kevin Gill was appointed the post of principal, making him the third head teacher in as many years at the school.

== See also ==
- List of schools in Westmorland and Furness
