= CGP (publisher) =

British textbook publishing company

- Type: Independent Company
- Industry: Publishing
- Founded: 1995
- Headquarters: Broughton-in-Furness, Cumbria, England
- Products: Textbooks and Revision Guides
- Website: cgpbooks.co.uk, CGP+

Coordination Group Publications (CGP) is an educational publisher and textbook publishing company from the United Kingdom, founded and owned by Richard Parsons. Having published over 1,000 books, their series of best-selling GCSE study guides are known for their light and humorous writing style.

== History ==
CGP was founded by Richard Parsons in 1995, following his resignation from his teaching position at Furness College. This was due to his dissatisfaction with the poor quality of study guides at the time. He then published his first manuscript, a Mathematics guide, which was a hit after being shared with individual schools. By the end of 2009, his 600 titles had sold over nine million books grossing over £48 million. Although he wrote the original books himself and they all bear his name, later books were written by other teachers.

== Products ==
CGP Revision Guides is the main product line published by CGP, covering a range of school subjects at KS1, KS2, KS3, 11+, 13+, GCSE, A-level and SATs. CGP's books often incorporate a witty and humorous tone, occasionally informal and colloquial, making them clear and easy to understand. They also make reference to examination questions from the UK National Curriculum.

For digital resources, online editions of their books can be read on their website, accessed using product codes. Many of them are also available as e-books on Kindle.

CGP also offer subscriptions services: CGP+ for online teaching resources aimed at primary schools, and 11+ Online, for online revision for the 11+ tests.

Their books have limited availability in Welsh.

The subjects offered include:

- Maths
- English
- Science
- Languages
- Geography
- History
- Technology & Food
- Music
- Business & Economics
- Psychology
- PE & Sport
- Sociology
- Computer Science & ICT
- Religious Studies
- Drama
- English as an Additional Language
- iMedia
- 'How to Revise'

== Controversy ==
The informal and humorous style in which many of CGP's books are written has caused controversy, especially considering that they are aimed at teenagers. In 2006, some parents complained about their sex education guide, with claims it was "explicit" and how it "trivialised sex".
