= Furness College, Barrow-in-Furness =

Further education college in Barrow-in-Furness, Cumbria, England

Coordinates: 54.1158°N 3.2420°W

Furness College
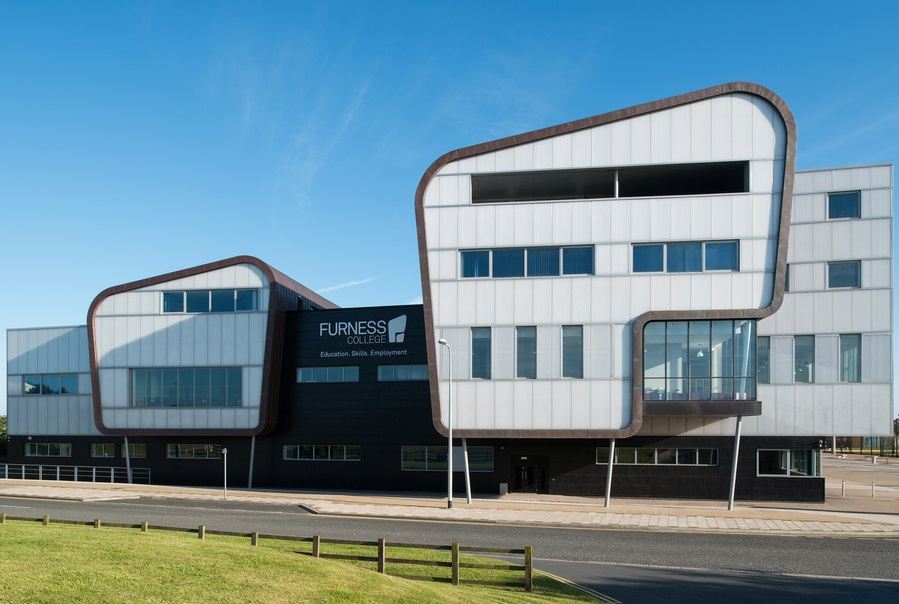
- Channelside Campus

Location
- Channelside Campus, Channelside, Barrow-in-Furness, Cumbria, England, LA14 2PJ; Sixth Form Campus, Rating Lane, Barrow-in-Furness, Cumbria, England, LA13 9LE

Information
- Type: Further Education
- Local authority: Westmorland & Furness Council
- Chair: Gary Lovatt
- Principal/Chief Executive: Nicola Cove
- Gender: Mixed
- Age: 16+
- Enrolment: 3000
- Website: Furness College

Furness College is a college of further education in Barrow-in-Furness, Cumbria. It provides a wide range of A levels, vocational education and skills training to over 16s, notably working with BAE Systems to train apprentices for their shipyard in Barrow. The college also offers courses for adults, and runs HNDs and other higher education programmes including foundation degrees, degrees and master's degrees, for which it achieved Teaching Excellence Framework silver status in June 2017. It is the only college in Barrow. On 1 August 2016, Furness College merged with Barrow Sixth Form College.

In August 2016, Furness College gained chartered college status when it became a member of the Chartered Institution for Further Education. This membership is awarded to the higher performing further education colleges and training providers in the UK. The college is also a member of the National Skills Academy for Nuclear.

== Profile ==
Furness College is a further education college based on two campuses in Barrow-in-Furness in Cumbria. It is the largest provider of education and training in south Cumbria offering a wide range of vocational courses to its students. The college has over 950 students aged 16–18, and over 300 adult students. In addition, over 600 apprentices are trained through the college each year.

The college currently has a number of students studying degrees and other higher education courses. The degrees are validated by Lancaster University, the University of Central Lancashire and the University of Cumbria.

== Campuses ==
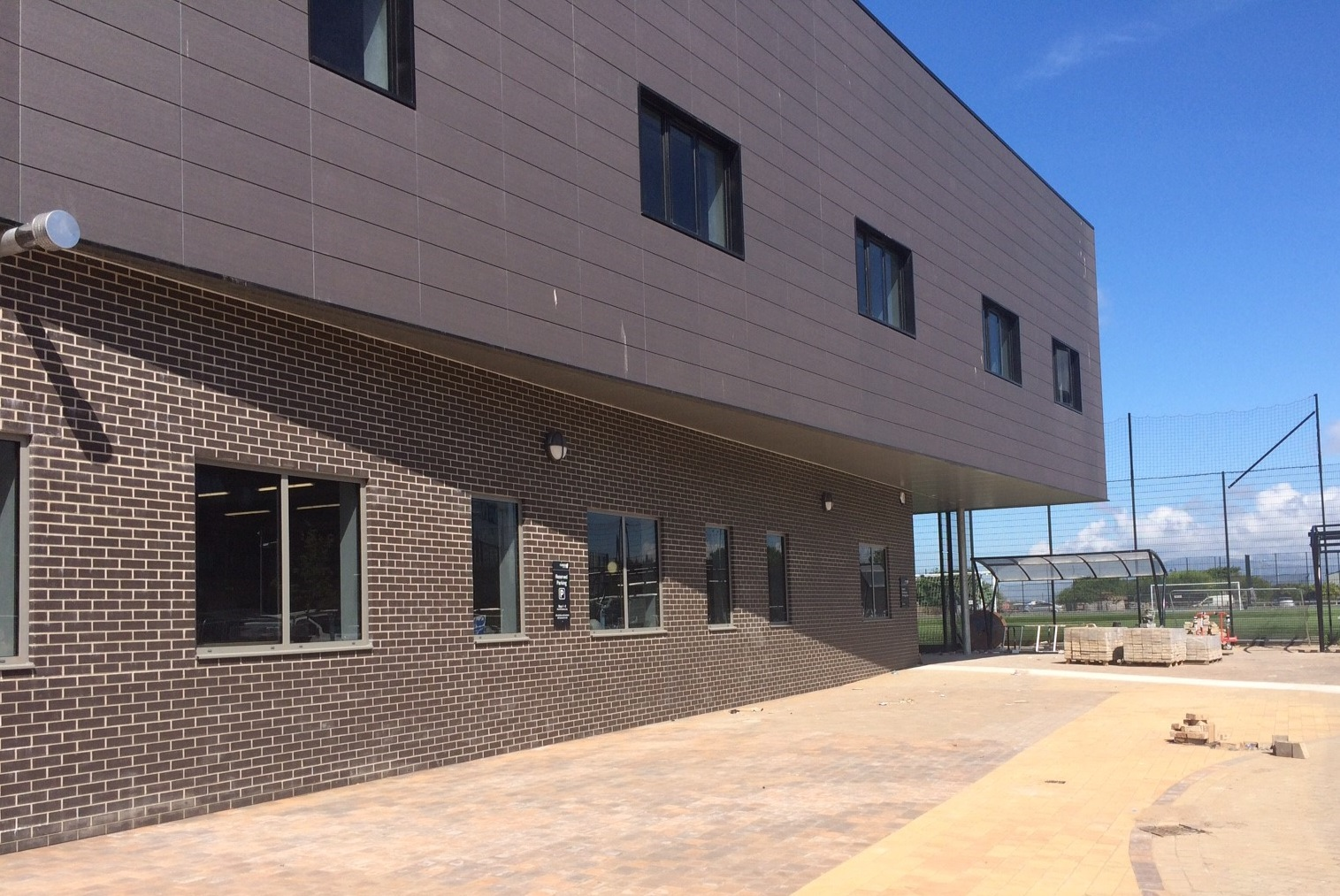
Advanced Manufacturing and Technology Centre

The college underwent a campus transformation with a £42 million rebuild which opened in 2012. The remodelled campus provides the people of Furness and South Cumbria with an educational environment where their experience of study will be related to the real world. The building provides workshops, salons, restaurant and a dedicated university centre. A major new part of this project was the development of the college's sport facilities to house a dedicated gym and an all-weather sports pitch.

In August 2016, the college opened a new Advanced Manufacturing and Technology Centre on the Channelside campus to accommodate its growing number of engineering students, including those studying on higher education courses. The building finished first in the 'Cumbria and Isle of Man' category of the BBC People's Choice award for 'North West Building of the Decade'.

As a result of the college's merger with Barrow Sixth Form College on 1 August 2016, the college has a second campus at Rating Lane in Barrow-in-Furness. This campus was opened in 1979 to replace existing school sixth form provision in the town's two grammar schools which have subsequently closed.

== Merger ==
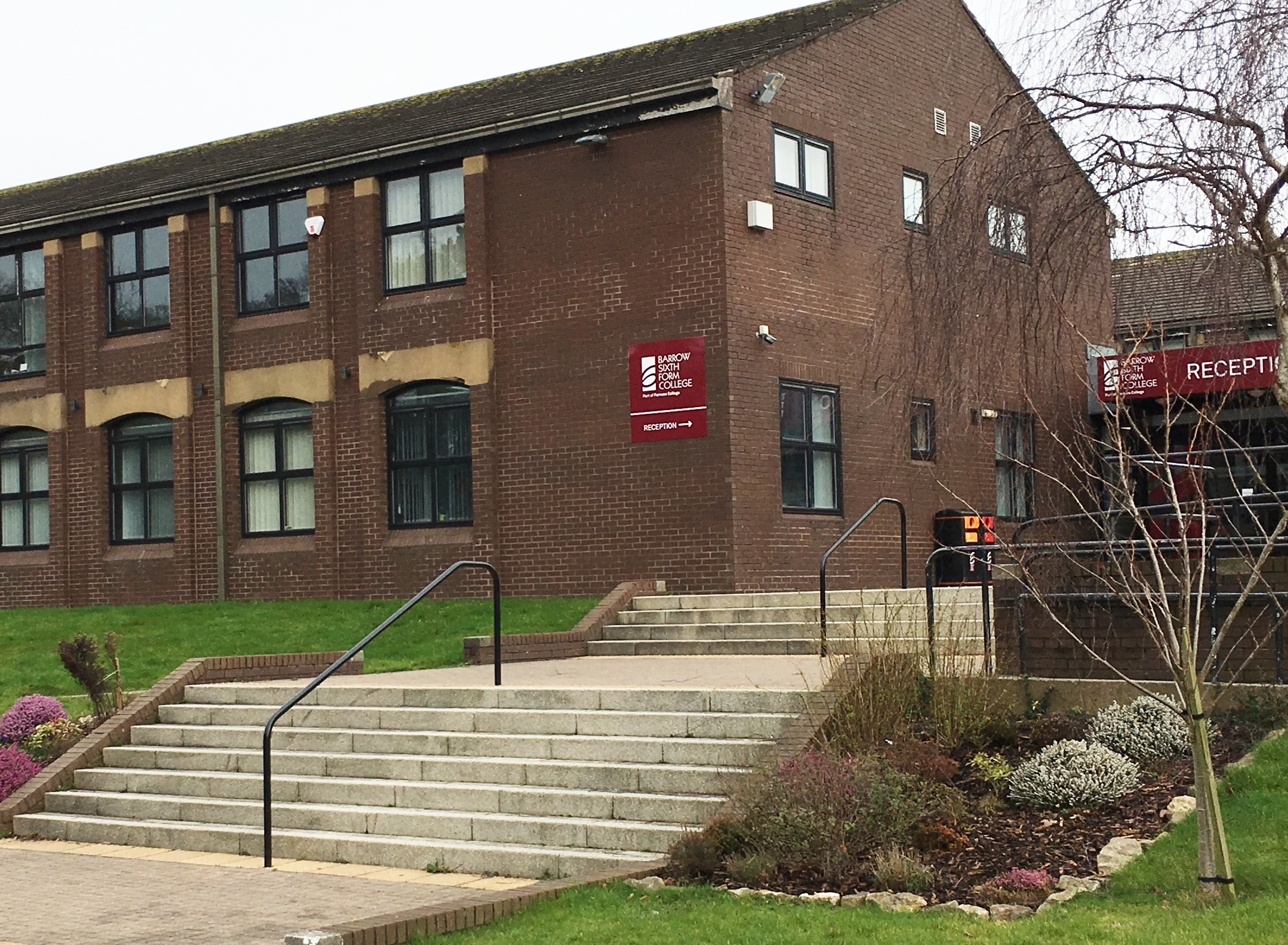
Sixth Form Campus

On 1 August 2016, Barrow Sixth Form College underwent a 'type B' merger with Furness College. The Sixth Form College received a financial notice to improve in January 2016 from the Education Funding Agency and was deemed no longer to be financially viable due to its inadequate financial health. As a result, merger discussions between the two colleges continued and on 1 August 2016, the corporation of Barrow Sixth Form College was dissolved and its assets and liabilities transferred to Furness College.

The college continued to operate on both campuses, which are approximately three miles apart, retaining both the Furness College and Sixth Form College brands until 2024 when the leadership team removed the Barrow Sixth Form College brand, finalising the end of Cumbria’s only sixth form college.

The majority of students in Barrow choosing to study A levels now travel to Ulverston Victoria High School which has a good Ofsted rating.

== Courses ==
Furness College offers a wide range of vocational courses which can be studied on a part-time or full-time basis.

- Full- and part-time courses - the college runs a large range of technical and professional courses for young people and adults, including T levels from 2021.
- Full-time A level courses.
- Business Development - the college works with the local business community to provide bespoke training courses.
- School Leavers - a wide range of full-time courses are available from Art & Design through to Engineering, Health & Social Care, Sport and lots more.
- Apprenticeships - Furness College currently trains over 1000 apprentices and works with over 400 employers.
- Higher Education - from foundation degrees to master's degrees in a range of subject areas.

== Ofsted Inspection ==
In comparison to its strong 2019 Ofsted judgement of good under its prior leadership and principal, the college, in 2024, was judged to be inadequate, the only further education college in England to have this judgement at the time of the inspection.

== Student Union ==
The Furness College Students' Union is affiliated to the National Union of Students, and all students of all Furness College campuses are entitled to membership. The college also offers extensive academic and pastoral support to all its students.

== Leadership and Management ==
The college is led by the senior leadership team under the direction and scrutiny of the Board of the Corporation which is also responsible for overseeing the strategic direction of the college. There is an interim Chair of Governors and Nicola Cove is the Principal and Chief Executive of Furness College, including Barrow Sixth Form College.

== Former teachers ==
- Richard Parsons, English educational study guide author.
