= St Bernard's Catholic High School =

Location
- Rating Lane; Barrow-in-Furness, Cumbria, LA13 9LE; England
- Coordinates: 54°07′46″N 3°12′01″W

Information
- Type: Academy
- Motto: Laborare est orare (To work is to pray)
- Religious affiliation: Roman Catholic
- Local authority: Westmorland and Furness
- Trust: Mater Christi Multi Academy Trust
- Department for Education URN: 148702 Tables
- Ofsted: Reports
- Headteacher: Daniel Vince
- Gender: Coeducational
- Age: 11 to 16
- Enrolment: 835
- Website: www.stbernardsschool.uk

St Bernard's Catholic High School is a coeducational Roman Catholic secondary school in Barrow-in-Furness, Furness, Cumbria, England.

It was established in 1979, when the introduction of comprehensive education in the town resulted in a merger between the former St. Aloysius School (1953) and the Girls' Convent School (otherwise known as 'Our Lady's School', which had been operated by the nuns from Croslands Convent since 1929). It was officially established as a Science School in 2006. The head teacher was Eugene Tumelty who had been there for thirty years. He retired at the end of the 2010–11 academic year. Tumelty received the Benemerenti Medal for his religious teachings in the school. Since September 2024 the headteacher has been Daniel Vince.

Previously a voluntary aided school administered by Cumbria County Council, in September 2021 St Bernard's Catholic High School converted to academy status. It is now sponsored by the Mater Christi Multi Academy Trust, and continues to be under the jurisdiction of the Roman Catholic Diocese of Lancaster.
