= JRS =

JRS may refer to:

== Businesses and organisations ==
- Jesuit Refugee Service, a Catholic aid organisation
- JPMorgan Russian Securities, an investment trust

== Places ==
- Jerusalem International Airport, unused airport in Israel
- John Ruskin School, Cumbria, England
- Joseph Rowntree School, York, England

== Other uses ==
- Joseph Robert Smallwood (1900–1991), Canadian politician
- Journal of Roman Studies (first published 1911)
- Sikorsky JRS, a 1930s seaplane model

== See also ==
- Juniors (disambiguation)
- JR (disambiguation)
