= Mary Beever =

British artist and botanist (1802–1883)

- Born: 1802; Ardwick, Greater Manchester, England
- Died: 31 December 1883 (aged 80–81); Coniston, Cumbria, England

Mary Beever (1802 – 31 December 1883) was a British artist and botanist. She and her sister were close friends with their neighbour John Ruskin in the Lake District. Plants collected by Beever are in several museum collections. She was an elected member of the Botanical Society of London.

== Life ==
Beever was born in Ardwick, in Manchester. Her father, William Beever, was a Manchester businessman and their mother, Nanny, died while she was young.

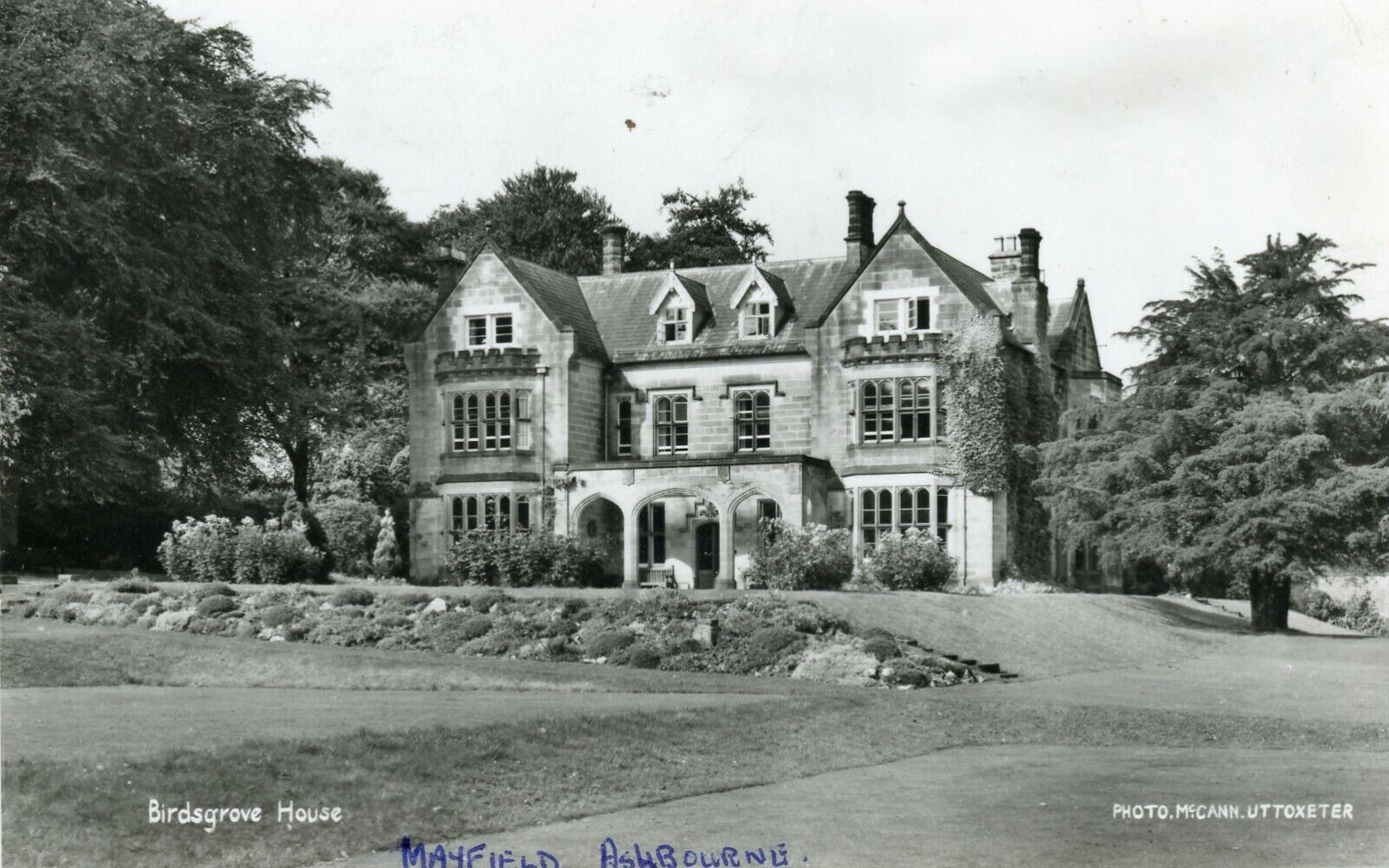
Birdsgrove House near Ashbourne postcard

They lived in Birdsgrove House near Ashbourne in Derbyshire before moving to The Thwaite in Coniston in Cumbria in 1827. Mary was a keen botanist and her collections are in several museums, including collections in Edinburgh, at the Hancock Museum in Newcastle, and at Oxford. She corresponded with botanist John Gilbert Baker, and sent Gentiana pneumonanthe specimens to William Baxter, curator at Oxford Botanic Garden. She was elected a member of the Botanical Society of London between 1839 and 1841. Her father died in 1831. Her brother John installed water power for a family printing press and a pond was created where he experimented with different fish foods. Her sister Anne died in 1858 and her brother, John, died the following year. She shared the house with her sister Susan after their sister Margaret died in 1874.

Mary and her sister Susanna were skilled botanical artists and they found themselves in John Ruskin's circle after they first met him in 1873. Ruskin lived on the other side of Coniston and he would write them letters although a short walk or a row in a boat would enable a visit. Ruskin was closest to "Susie" and in 1875 he allowed her to create an abridged version of his book Modern Painters.

Beever died at their home in Coniston in 1883.
