= Brown Pike =

Mountain in the English Lake District, Cumbria, England

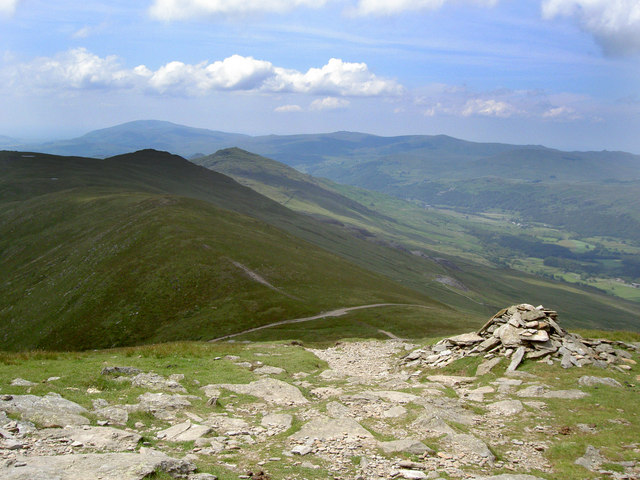

Highest point
- Elevation: 682 m (2,238 ft)
- Prominence: more than 20 m
- Coordinates: 54°21′34″N 3°08′25″W

Geography
- Location within the Lake District
- Location: Lake District, England
- OS grid: SD260966
- Topo map: OS Landranger 96

Brown Pike is a fell located in the Lake District National Park in Cumbria, England. Brown Pike is near the village of Coniston, and is most commonly approached from there with walkers often continuing onto Buck Pike, Dow Crag and the Old Man of Coniston. There are two main ways to summit, the first being via a path on the south-western side of the mountain marked on Ordnance Survey maps. The second route involves a narrow path along the south slope of the mountain; this route involves some scrambling.
