= North British =

North British is an adjective used as an alternative to "Scottish", it may also refer to northern regions of England

North British may also refer to:

- North British Academy of Arts
- North British Distillery
- North British Locomotive Company
- North British Railway
- North British Hotel - now known as The Balmoral Hotel.

== See also ==
- North Britain
