= H. R. Hall =

H. R. Hall may refer to:

- Henry Robinson Hall (1859–1927), English painter
- Harry Reginald Hall (1873–1930), English Egyptologist and historian
- Hanna R. Hall (born 1984), American actress
