= Buck Pike =

Mountain in the English Lake District, Cumbria, England

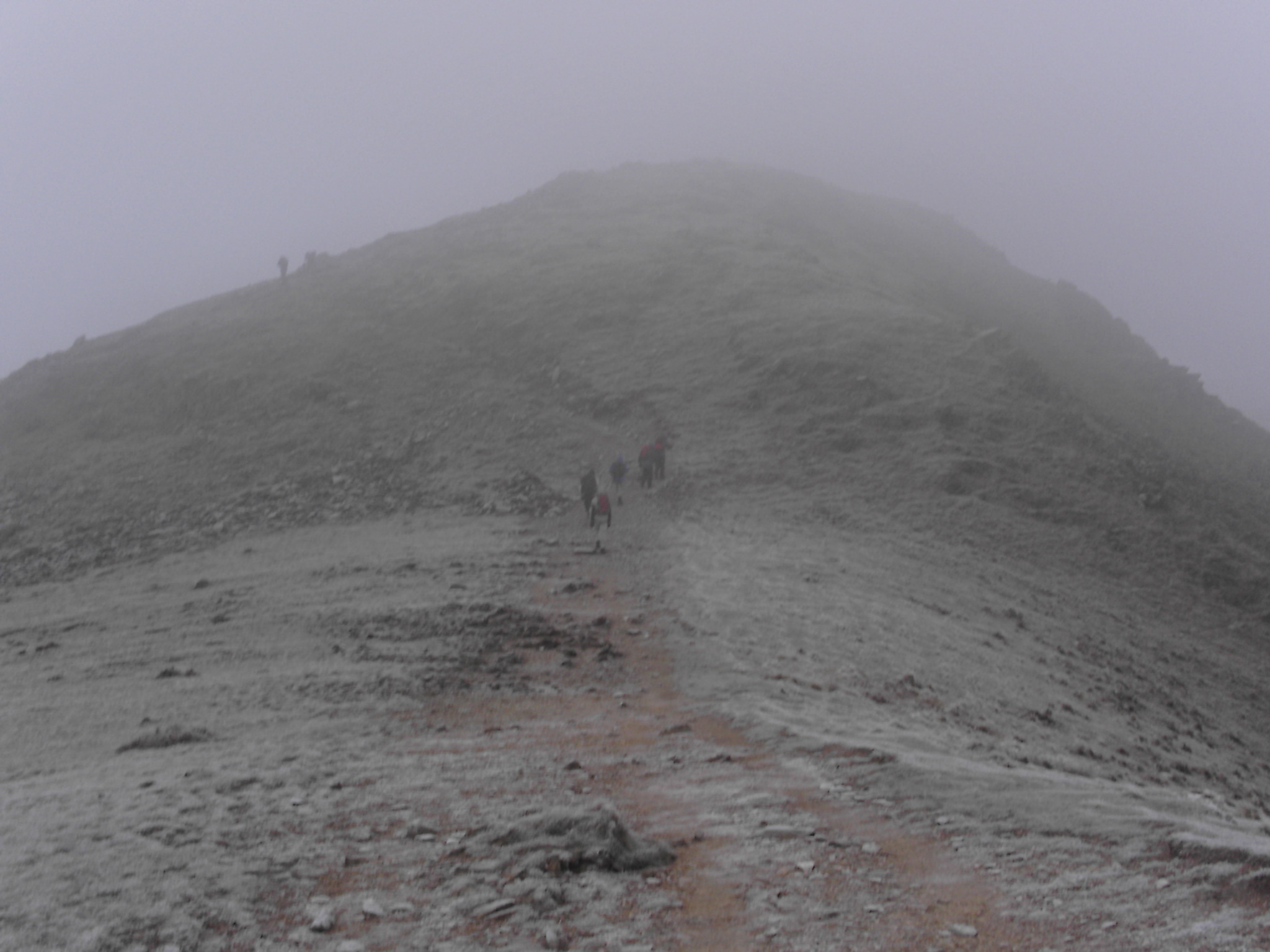
- Buck Pike in bad weather

Highest point
- Elevation: 744 m (2,441 ft)
- Prominence: c. 10 m
- Coordinates: 54°21′54″N 3°08′14″W

Geography
- Location within the Lake District
- Location: Lake District, England
- OS grid: SD262972
- Topo map: OS Landranger 96

Buck Pike is a fell located in the Lake District National Park in Cumbria. Buck Pike is near the village of Coniston. Other fells in this area include Brown Pike, Dow Crag, and the Old Man of Coniston.
