= Listed buildings in Coniston, Cumbria =

Coniston is a civil parish in Westmorland and Furness, Cumbria, England. It contains 53 listed buildings that are recorded in the National Heritage List for England. Of these, four are listed at Grade II*, the middle of the three grades, and the others are at Grade II, the lowest grade. The parish is in the Lake District National Park and is located to the west, north and east of Coniston Water. Most of the listed buildings are houses and associated structures, farmhouses and farm buildings. The other listed buildings include bridges, a limekiln, a folly, a boundary stone, a church, a drinking fountain, and a memorial.

== Key ==
Grade	Criteria
II*	Particularly important buildings of more than special interest
II	Buildings of national importance and special interest

== Buildings ==
Name and location	Photograph	Date	Notes	Grade
Coniston Hall; 54.35787°N 3.07175°W		16th century	Originally a country house, later used for other purposes, and partly in ruins. It has a T-shaped plan, consisting of a hall and cross-wing. It is in stone with a slate roof, and has two storeys. The entrance front has four bays with ruins to the left, the right bay projecting and gabled. The windows are mullioned and transomed, and a ramp leads up to a first floor entrance. In the ruins are a bressumer, a first-floor fireplace, and a garderobe. At the rear is a projecting stair turret, and the chimneys are round and tapering on square bases.	II*
Barn, Atkinson Ground Farm; 54.37023°N 3.04608°W	—	16th or 17th century	The barn is in stone with a slate roof and four bays. It contains mullioned windows, a barn entrance, a blocked winnowing door, and pigeon holes. Inside are two cruck trusses.	II
Boon Crag Farmhouse; 54.37625°N 3.05520°W		17th century	A stone farmhouse with a roughcast front, two storeys, five bays, flanking lean-to outbuildings, and a rear gabled wing. The windows vary; most are casements, there are some sash windows, and a small-paned fixed window with a mullion. In the first bay is an entrance and a first floor loading door. Inside the house are two upper cruck trusses.	II
Barns, Boon Crag Farm; 54.37620°N 3.05488°W	—	17th century	A group of farm buildings in stone with slate roofs, the oldest being a four-bay barn. To the west, and dating from the 18th century, is a cow house with a projecting store and later additions. Dating from the late 19th century are a bank barn with three bays, a gabled entrance, lunettes and ventilation slits, and a separate gabled structure; both of these have quoins.	II
Bowmanstead; 54.36226°N 3.07866°W		17th century	A house and a former shop in roughcast stone with slate roofs. There are two storeys and six bays, the 4th to 6th bays being lower. To the left is a single storey bay and then two bays with two storeys; to the right is a single-bay extension. The windows are a mix of casements, fixed windows, and sashes, some of which are horizontally-sliding. On the front is a timber porch, and at the rear is an outshut and a wing with a flat-topped dormer. Inside the house is an upper cruck truss.	II
Far End Cottages; 54.37399°N 3.07501°W		17th century (probable)	A row of six stone houses with a slate roof. There are ten bays, the first bay has three storeys, and the others have two. Most of the windows are casements, and there are some sash windows. At the entrances are gabled slate canopies, and at the rear of some of the houses are gabled wings.	II
High Yewdale Farmhouse and outbuildings 54.38849°N 3.05646°W		17th century	The farmhouse and outbuildings are in stone with slate roofs, the house being roughcast. The house has two storeys, four bays, and a gabled rear wing. Most of the windows are sashes, above the ground floor windows are drip courses, and there are two gabled porches on the front. The outbuildings include a cow house and a barn.	II
Low Yewdale Farmhouse and cottage 54.38292°N 3.06122°W		17th century	A pair of stone houses with a slate roof, two storeys and five bays, the first two bays added later. The windows are 20th-century casements, and above the ground floor windows is a slate dripcourse. There are two entrances, one with gabled slate canopy.	II
S.V. Gondola Stores; 54.37380°N 3.07534°W		17th century	A barn and cow house in stone with a slate roof. The barn has eight bays, with the cow house at the southeast, and an outshut at the rear. The windows have timber lintels, most are casements, and some are mullioned. The building contains barn doors, ventilation slits, and there are owl holes in the gable ends.	II
Slater's Bridge; 54.41783°N 3.06165°W		17th century	A former packhorse bridge over the River Brathay. In the centre is a large natural boulder, to the south is a segmental arch with a span of 15 feet (4.6 m) and voussoirs, and to the north is a single flat slab of slate on slate supports.	II*
Yew Tree Farmhouse; 54.38965°N 3.04944°W		1665	The farmhouse was extended in 1743. It is in stone, partly roughcast, it has a slate roof, and is cruck-framed. There are two storeys, three bays, and a lower two-bay wing at the rear. On the front is an open gabled slate porch, and the windows are casements with a fire window. Inside the rear wing are two upper cruck trusses.	II
Low Yewdale Cottage; 54.38304°N 3.06097°W		Late 17th century	A stone house with a slate roof, two storeys, two bays, and a rear wing. The windows are mullioned with casements, and there is a fire window. Above the entrance is a gabled slate canopy.	II
Low Tilberthwaite; 54.40075°N 3.07187°W		1687	A roughcast stone house with a slate roof and two storeys. There are four bays, the left two bays converted from stables with an open-fronted first floor gallery. There are two doorways, one with a slate gabled canopy. The windows on the front are small-paned casements, and at the rear is a two-light mullioned window.	II
Low Hall Garth; 54.41673°N 3.06534°W		1689	Three houses and a barn in stone with slate roofs and two storeys forming an L-shaped plan. At the north end is a farmhouse facing northeast. It has two bays, casement windows, and a slate canopy over the doorway. The other buildings form a range at right angles, facing northwest. At the north end is the barn containing doors and ventilation slits, and inside having three cruck trusses. At the south end are two cottages, each with two bays, and a single-storey bay at the end; they have casement windows, and each cottage has a porch.	II
Rowlandson Ground; 54.37254°N 3.04494°W	—	1690	A stone house with a roughcast front, and a slate roof. The front has five bays, the first three bays have two storeys, and the other two have one storey, there is a small bay to the left, and at the rear is a stair wing and an outshut. The windows vary; most are casements, some are mullioned, there is a fire window, and a sash window. On the front is a gabled glazed porch, and in the end bay are garage doors.	II
Atkinson Ground Farmhouse and cottages 54.37042°N 3.04632°W	—	17th or early 18th century	A row of three roughcast stone houses with slate roofs. There are two storeys and five bays, the first bay being lower, and at the rear are a gabled wing, s stair wing, and a lean-to outshut. Most of the windows are sashes, and there are some casements. On the front are two gabled slate porches, and on the right return is a gabled trellis porch.	II
Boon Crag and barn 54.37559°N 3.05342°W	—	17th or 18th century (possible)	Two houses and a barn in stone with a slate roof. The houses have two storeys, three bays, the first two bays projecting forward and gabled, and a rear gabled wing. The windows vary; most are casements, some are sashes, there is a fire window, and some windows have slate lintels. The entrance in the first bay has a gabled slate hood, and the entrance in the third bay is recessed. The barn to the rear has central doors, windows, and ventilation slits.	II
Boon Crag Cottage, High Waterhead, and High Waterhead Cottage; 54.37536°N 3.05402°W	—	17th or early 18th century	A row of three roughcast houses with slate roofs and two storeys. They have a front of eight bays, and a north return of two bays. Most of the windows are casements, and some are sashes. Above the entrances are gabled canopies, and at the rear is a lean-to outshut and a wing.	II
Bridge End Cottage and barn 54.41691°N 3.07852°W		Late 17th or 18th century	A stone house and a barn with a slate roof. The house has two storeys and four bays. Most of the windows are casements, and on the front is a slate gabled canopy. The barn to the right has doors and a window, and to its right are two small extensions. Inside the barn is an upper cruck truss.	II
Haws Bank Cottage and adjoining cottage 54.36007°N 3.07909°W		17th or early 18th century	A roughcast stone house with a slate roof, two storeys and four bays, and at the rear is a continuous outshut and an outhouse. Most of the windows are casements, some are sashes, and there is a cross-mullioned window. At the entrance is a lean-to timber porch.	II
High Hall Garth; 54.41593°N 3.06689°W		17th or early 18th century	The house and barn are in stone with slate roofs, the oldest part is the barn, the house dating from the 19th century. The house has three bays, the first bay having one storey and the others have two storeys. Some windows are casements, others are fixed, and there is a fire window. At the entrance is a gabled porch containing shelves. On the right is a pigsty with slate pen walls. At the rear is a kitchen wing and a barn containing two cruck trusses, and an outshut.	II
Barn, High Waterhead; 54.37547°N 3.05371°W	—	17th or early 18th century (probable)	The barn is in stone with a slate roof. In the south front is an open gallery with timber posts and an entrance, and below it are two entrances. At the rear are barn doors, and an outshut on the left.	II
Hollin Bank Cottage; 54.37526°N 3.04684°W	—	17th or early 18th century	A stone house, roughcast at the front, with a slate roof, two storeys, three bays, and a right outshut. Most of the windows are casements, with one fixed window, a fire window, and a gabled dormer. At the entrance is a gabled slate slab porch.	II
Bee boles, High Yewdale Farm; 54.38916°N 3.05624°W	—	17th or 18th century (possible)	The bee boles are in a drystone wall to the north of the farm, and consist of eight recesses for bee skeps.	II
Knipe Ground; 54.36897°N 3.04750°W	—	17th or early 18th century (probable)	A stone house with a slate roof, two storeys and three bays, and an extension and an outshut at the rear. The windows are casements, one is set in a former stable door, one has a slate-hung lintel and drip course, and there is a fire window.	II
Pierce How Bridge; 54.41561°N 3.05462°W		17th or 18th century	The bridge carries a track over Pierce How Beck. It is in slate and consists of a single segmental arch with thin voussoirs, and abutments only to the height of top of the arch.	II
Cottage to rear of Sun Inn Public House; 54.36924°N 3.07872°W		17th or early 18th century (possible)	A roughcast stone house with a slate roof, two storeys, two bays, and two outshuts at the rear. In the ground floor is a fixed window, a casement window, and a fire window, and in the upper floor the windows are mullioned. Above the entrance is a slate gabled hood.	II
Tarn Hows Cottage; 54.38589°N 3.04819°W		17th or early 18th century	A house with an outbuilding and the ruins of a possible earlier house, they are in stone, partly roughcast, and with a slate roof. There are two storeys, the house has three bays, the outbuilding has two, and at the rear is a gabled wing. The windows on the front are sashes with a continuous drip course, and at the rear they are casements. On the front is a large gabled porch, a separate smaller entrance, and garage doors, both with slate lintels. The ruins are to the right.	II
Barn, Yew Tree Farm; 54.38942°N 3.04957°W		Late 17th or early 18th century	The barn is in stone with a slate roof, and has five bays with an 18th-century four-bay extension to the north. In the extension is a gallery above a cow house, with stone steps leading up to the gallery.	II
High Tilberthwaite Farmhouse and outbuilding 54.40338°N 3.06729°W		1721	The farmhouse and outbuilding are in stone with a slate roof. The house has two storeys and four bays, and the outbuilding to the right has three bays. The house has an open lean-to porch, casement windows, and a slate dripcourse. The outbuilding has a lean-to outshut and mullioned windows.	II
Atkinson Ground House; 54.37042°N 3.04667°W		18th century	A roughcast stone house with a slate roof and two storeys. There are five bays, a single-bay extension to the left, and a gabled rear bay. The windows are casements, some with mullions, and a fire window, and above the ground floor windows is a drip course. On the front is a large gabled porch.	II
Lodge and former stable, Brantwood; 54.35306°N 3.05962°W		18th century (probable)	The stable is the older part, the lodge being added in 1872 for John Ruskin. The building is in roughcast stone with a slate roof. There are two storeys, two bays, and a smaller recessed bay to the rear. The windows are mullioned. In the left corner is a flat-topped canted dormer with a gable, and in the right corner is an oriel window with a pyramidal roof. Elsewhere there are sash windows, and a first floor loading door.	II*
Barn, Dixon Ground Farm; 54.36965°N 3.07955°W		18th century (probable)	The barn is in stone with a slate roof, with a later gabled wing to the right, a lean-to, and a rear outshut. It contains barn doors and other entrances, and inserted windows.	II
High Bank Ground Farmhouse and barn 54.36425°N 3.05425°W		18th century	This consists of two houses and outbuildings in stone, the houses roughcast, with slate roofs. The houses have two storeys, five bays, and trellis porches. Most of the windows are sashes, with one casement window. To the right is a two-bay gabled wing with a bay window. At the rear are an outshut, a small gabled wing, a bank barn, and a granary with external steps leading to the upper floor.	II
Bee boles, High Bank Ground Farm; 54.36447°N 3.05408°W	—	18th century (possible)	The bee boles are in stone, and consist of two pairs of square recesses with projecting slate courses.	II
Limekiln; 54.38029°N 3.06514°W	—	18th century	The limekiln is in slate, and has a round, slightly tapering plan. The entrance has a splayed corbelled arch, above which is a timber beam and a slate drip course. The shaft is roughly cylindrical, partly blocked, and open at the top.	II
Barn, Low Yewdale Farm; 54.38271°N 3.06147°W	—	18th century	This consists of a bank barn with a cow shed beneath. It is in stone with a slate roof, and there is a lean-to projection to the right. The building contains windows with wooden frames, pivoted barn doors, square ventilation holes, and slate dripcourses.	II
Shepherd's Bridge; 54.38965°N 3.05764°W		18th century (probable)	The bridge carries a road over Yewdale Beck. It is in stone, and consists of a single segmental arch with a plain parapet.	II
Dixon Ground Farmhouse and outbuilding 54.36959°N 3.07928°W		1762	The building is roughcast with a slate roof and two storeys. The house has two bays, the former stables to the left are lower with two bays, and at the rear is a projecting bay and a lean-to outshut. The windows in the house are sashes, in the former stables they are small-paned and fixed, and above the ground floor windows are dripstones. The house has a cast iron gabled decorative porch, and above it is a datestone. At the rear is a gabled dormer.	II
Brantwood; 54.35351°N 3.05921°W		c. 1797	A country house that was altered on a number of occasions through the 19th and early 20th century. It is in roughcast stone with a hipped slate roof. The main front has two storeys and four bays. The first bay has an elongated octagon plan, the second bay has a rectangular bay window with a wooden balustrade, and the fourth bay has a hexagonal angle turret with a pyramidal roof. At the rear is a wing mainly of three storeys, with a single-storey dining room projection, gables with decorative bargeboards, oriel windows, and a canted French window. One of its notable residents was John Ruskin.	II*
Eye catcher 54.37292°N 3.07001°W		18th or early 19th century	A stone folly consisting of a screen wall with a projecting parapet and a lean-to structure at the rear. The wall is flanked by turrets with projecting parapets, and contains a central pointed arch, partly blocked, arrow slits, and a blocked square window.	II
Counting house, Monk Coniston Hall; 54.37608°N 3.05048°W	—	18th or early 19th century	A roughcast house with a hipped slate roof, two storeys, and three bays. The entrance is round-headed, it has a moulded hood on timber Doric columns, and above the door is a fluted frieze and a fanlight. In the ground floor are Venetian windows, and in the upper floor is a round-headed recess with flanking sash windows. At the rear is a first floor extension on posts.	II
Former stable, Monk Coniston Hall; 54.37599°N 3.05095°W	—	18th or early 19th century (probable)	The building is in roughcast stone with a slate roof, two storeys and three bays, the central bay projecting forward under a gable. There are entrances in the first two bays, in the first bay it is round-headed with a fanlight. The other openings include windows with heads of varying shapes, a pitching hole, and lunettes. On the roof is a weathervane.	II
Boundary stone (Three Shires Stone); 54.41501°N 3.11523°W		1816	The boundary stone stands at the meeting point of the historic counties of Lancashire, Cumberland and Westmorland, and was erected as a memorial. It consists of a pillar with a rectangular plan about 6 feet (1.8 m) high, and inscribed on one side with initials and the year, and on the other side with "LANCASHIRE".	II
St Andrew's Church; 54.36887°N 3.07510°W		1819	The chancel was added in 1891 when other alterations were made. The church is in slate with ashlar dressings and a slate roof with coped gables. It consists of a nave, a chancel with a north vestry and a south organ loft, and a west tower that has flanking porches with embattled parapets. The tower has a string course, a clock face, louvred bell openings, and an embattled parapet. The windows in the nave have elliptical heads and hood moulds, and the east window in the chancel has five lights and Perpendicular tracery.	II
Monk Coniston Hall; 54.37571°N 3.05112°W		c. 1820	A country house that was altered and extended later in the 19th century. It is in stuccoed stone with a slate roof, and is in Gothic style. There are two storeys, four bays, the central two bays projecting forward under a gable, and rear wings. At the corners are clasping buttresses rising to form turrets with corbelled-out embattled parapets. On the right side is a canted bay with Tudor arches in the ground floor and an embattled parapet. All the windows are sashes, some have flat tops, some are Tudor-arched, and others have pointed heads.	II
Privy, Coniston Hall; 54.35764°N 3.07177°W		19th century (possible)	The privy is a stone building with a slate roof. It contains a plank seat with two holes, one with a seat.	II
Outbuilding, Brantwood; 54.35333°N 3.05929°W		1850s	The building is in stone with quoins and a slate roof. There are two storeys, three bays, and a lean-to bay to the right. There are two doorways on the ground floor, and steps leading up to a first floor entrance on the right.	II
Former coach-house and stable, Brantwood; 54.35282°N 3.05985°W	—	1872	The coach house and stable were built for John Ruskin and were later used for other purposes. The building is in slate with a slate roof, two storeys, and three bays, the left bay projecting forward under a gable. To the right is a single-storey wing with a half-hipped gable. The windows are casements with hood moulds, and other features include a doorway with a fanlight, a loading door with a gablet, and gabled half-dormers.	II
Icehouse, Brantwood; 54.35379°N 3.05913°W		1870s (possible)	The ice house is to the north of the house. A natural opening in the bank leads to steps into a cylindrical cavity. There is an opening on the top covered by a slab.	II
Drinking Fountain; 54.37659°N 3.03775°W		1885	The drinking fountain is in slate, and consists of a wall at the rear and three piers with bands and caps. On the central pier is the cast iron drinking fountain with a bowl, below which is a dog bowl. To the left is a horse trough, and to the right is a seat, and above each of these is an inscribed panel. It was created by Susanna Beever.	II
Ruskin Cross; 54.36884°N 3.07475°W		1901	The memorial to John Ruskin, designed by W. G. Collingwood, is in the churchyard of St Andrew's Church. It is in green local stone and is in the form of a Celtic cross. The cross has a slightly tapering shaft with a rectangular plan, a cross-head, and swept arms. On both sides are carved panels representing Ruskin's writings and other attributes, together with scrollwork interlacing.	II
War memorial 54.36887°N 3.07542°W		1920	The memorial is in the churchyard of St Andrew's church; it was designed by W. G. Collingwood and sculpted by his daughter Barbara. The memorial is in sandstone, and consists of a Celtic-style wheel-head cross on a shaft with a rectangular base of three steps. On the cross is a central boss and a knotwork design, and the shaft is decorated with interlace carvings. On the shaft is an inscription and the names of those lost in the First World War. The names of those lost in the Second World War have been added to the base.	II
