= Coniston Hall =

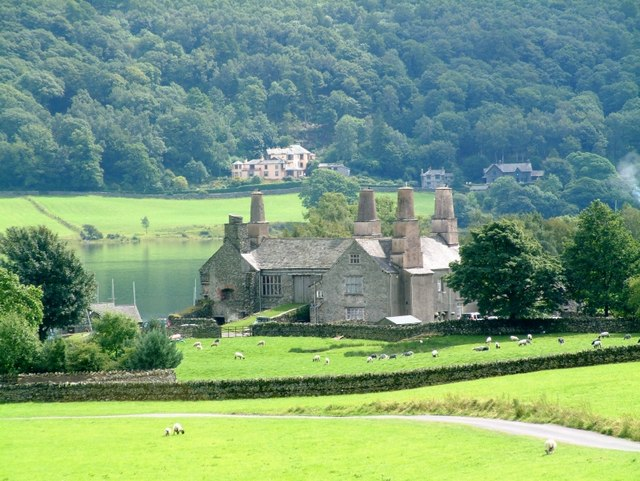

- Location in South Lakeland Location in Cumbria
- 54°21′28″N 3°4′18″W
- Location: Coniston, Cumbria, England
- OS grid reference: SD 304 963

History
- Built: Late 16th century, or earlier

Site notes
- Architectural style: Vernacular
- Governing body: National Trust

Listed Building – Grade II*
- Designated: 18 May 1953

Coniston Hall is a former house on the west bank of Coniston Water in the English Lake District. It is recorded in the National Heritage List for England as a designated Grade II* listed building.

The house dates from the late 16th century, or possibly earlier. It is built in stone rubble with a slate roof. Part of it is now ruined, part is used as a farmhouse, and another part is used by a sailing club.

The hall is owned by the National Trust, but is not open to the public. A privy about 13 metres (43 ft) to the south of the hall is listed at Grade II.

== See also ==
- Grade II* listed buildings in Westmorland and Furness
- Listed buildings in Coniston, Cumbria
