= Susanna Beever =

British artist

Susan Beever
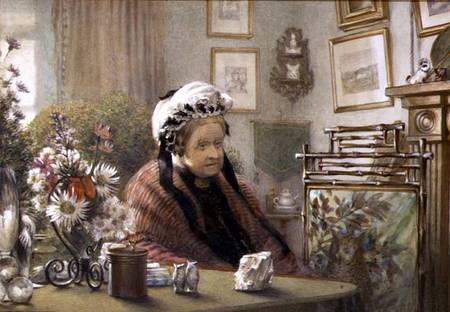
- Miss Susan Beever at the Thwaite by W. G. Collingwood
- Born: Susanna Beever; 17 November 1805; Manchester
- Died: 29 October 1893 (aged 87); Coniston, Cumbria
- Known for: close friend of John Ruskin

Susan Beever born Susanna Beever (17 November 1805 – 29 October 1893) was a British artist and writer who was close to John Ruskin. They were buried beside each other in Coniston Churchyard.

== Life ==
Beever was born in Manchester in 1805. Her father, William Beever, was a Manchester businessman and their mother, Nanny, died while she was young. Her family lived in Birdsgrove House near Ashbourne in Derbyshire before moving to The Thwaite in Coniston in Cumbria in 1827. Her father died in 1831. Her brother John installed water power for a family printing press and a pond was created where he experimented with fish foods. John wrote a book about fly-fishing in 1849. Her sister Anne died in 1858 and her brother, John, died in the following year. She shared the house with her sister Mary after their sister Margaret died in 1874.

She was a strong supporter of Ragged Schools which provided education to children too poor to pay for schooling and too unkempt or undisciplined to attend Sunday Schools. In 1853 her pamphlet letter, Foodless, Friendless, in our Streets, was published which encouraged more support for the Ragged Schools Union. The Union had started in 1844 with only a few schools and it would by 1870 have close to 400 schools registered.

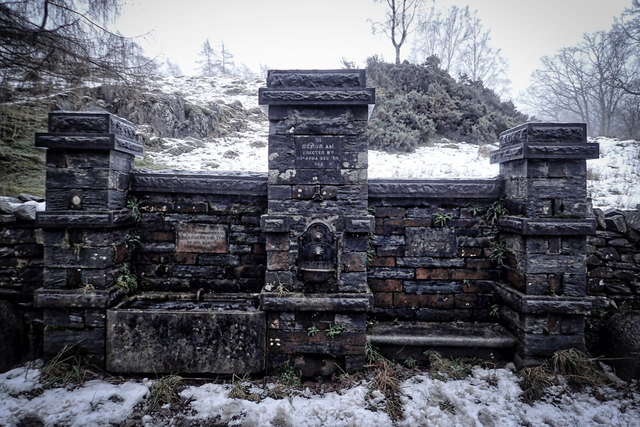
The Susanna Beever Drinking Fountain

She and her sister Mary Beever were skilled botanical artists and they met John Ruskin in 1873. Ruskin lived on the other side of Coniston Water and he would write them letters even though a short walk or a row in a boat would enable a visit. Ruskin was closest to her and, in 1875, he allowed her to create an abridged version of his book Modern Painters.

Her sister, Mary, died in 1883 and in 1887 the letters that Ruskin sent "in Happy Days to the Sister Ladies of the Thwaite" was published under the title of "Hortus Inclusus".

Beever died on 29 November 1893 in Coniston where she was buried in the churchyard. John Ruskin was buried beside her after he died.
