= Nestor Cambier =

Belgian artist and draftsman (1879–1957)

Nestor Cambier (1879–1957) was a Belgian artist and draftsman whose portraits were compared favourably with those of John Singer Sargent but who now is largely forgotten. He also painted landscapes, city and interior views, still-lives, murals and stained glass, and also produced numerous pencil and chalk drawings.

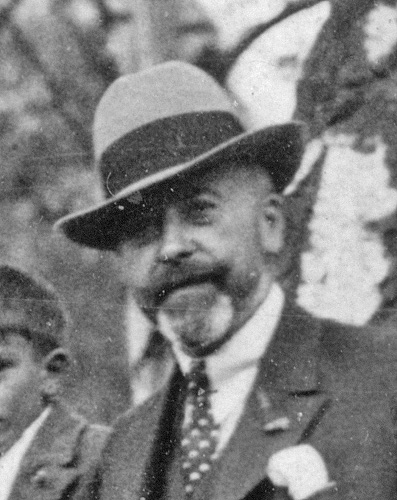
Nestor Cambier in 1930

== Early life and training ==
Cambier was born in Couillet (now part of Charleroi) in Belgium. He studied at the college of Ixelles, Brussels, before entering the Académie Royale des Beaux-Arts in Brussels, where he studied portraiture under the masters Joseph Stallaert and Gustave Vanaise until 1900. At age 21 he had already exhibited at the Brussels Salon, with a portrait of a young girl and a landscape.

== Professional life ==
In 1903, Cambier exhibited at the Triennial Salon of Beaux Arts in Brussels with pictures of a Brabançon innkeeper, a colourful Bazaar, a large tableau of the Cid and the Leper, and a study in pastels of Salome.

He went to the United States (1906–1909), working first at Ascenzo's studios. He continued to paint portraits and in 1907 exhibited at the Academy of Fine Art in Philadelphia, Pennsylvania, where he won the John Wanamaker prize. He designed large stained glass windows for the Cathedral Basilica of the Sacred Heart, , Newark, New Jersey, while it was under construction. (Recent investigation shows that delays in construction resulted in the 214 stained glass windows not being completed until 1950, by when they had been redesigned by Franz Zettler.)

Cambier returned to Belgium in 1909, where he painted further portraits and extended his painting to landscapes. In 1914 he held an exhibition of his works at Blankenberge, Belgium, where he was almost trapped when Germany invaded Belgium at the start of the First World War, and which resulted in the loss of many of his canvasses.

He then spent 19 years intermittently in the United Kingdom (1914–1933), and in 1915 and 1916 he donated some of his works for auction on behalf of the British Red Cross, reaching prices comparable with the best English painters. In 1923 he became a member of the North British Academy of Arts, and became a resident guest of Sir Henry and Lady Barber at Culham Court, near Henley, Oxfordshire. During this time, he painted numerous portraits of Lady Barber (1869–1932), and pictures of the interior of Culham Court and the surrounding countryside.

== Posthumous fame ==
Following his death in Brussels in 1957, a retrospective show of Cambier's art was held in Brussels in 1967 at the Baron René Steens gallery. His works are allegedly displayed in Birmingham, London, Paris, Rheims and Lausanne.

Perhaps the largest collection of Cambier's paintings (25, plus numerous photographs and memorabilia) are held by The Barber Institute of Fine Arts, founded by Dame Martha Constance Hattie Barber (1869–1933) at Birmingham University, who married the solicitor and property developer, William Henry Barber, a highly successful businessman who made his fortune in the expanding suburbs of Birmingham. By the mid 1930s he and Lady Barber were able to retire to Culham Court, an 18th-century estate in Oxfordshire. Between 1914 and 1930, Cambier was a frequent visitor and resident there, where he painted landscapes of the estate and painted eighteen portraits commissioned by Lady Barber as presents for her husband. Lord Barber died in 1927, and Lady Barber founded the institute in 1932 to which all the paintings were transferred. Cambier's other paintings appear to be dispersed in private hands.

== Honours ==
- 1924 : Knight of the Order of the Crown.

== Gallery ==
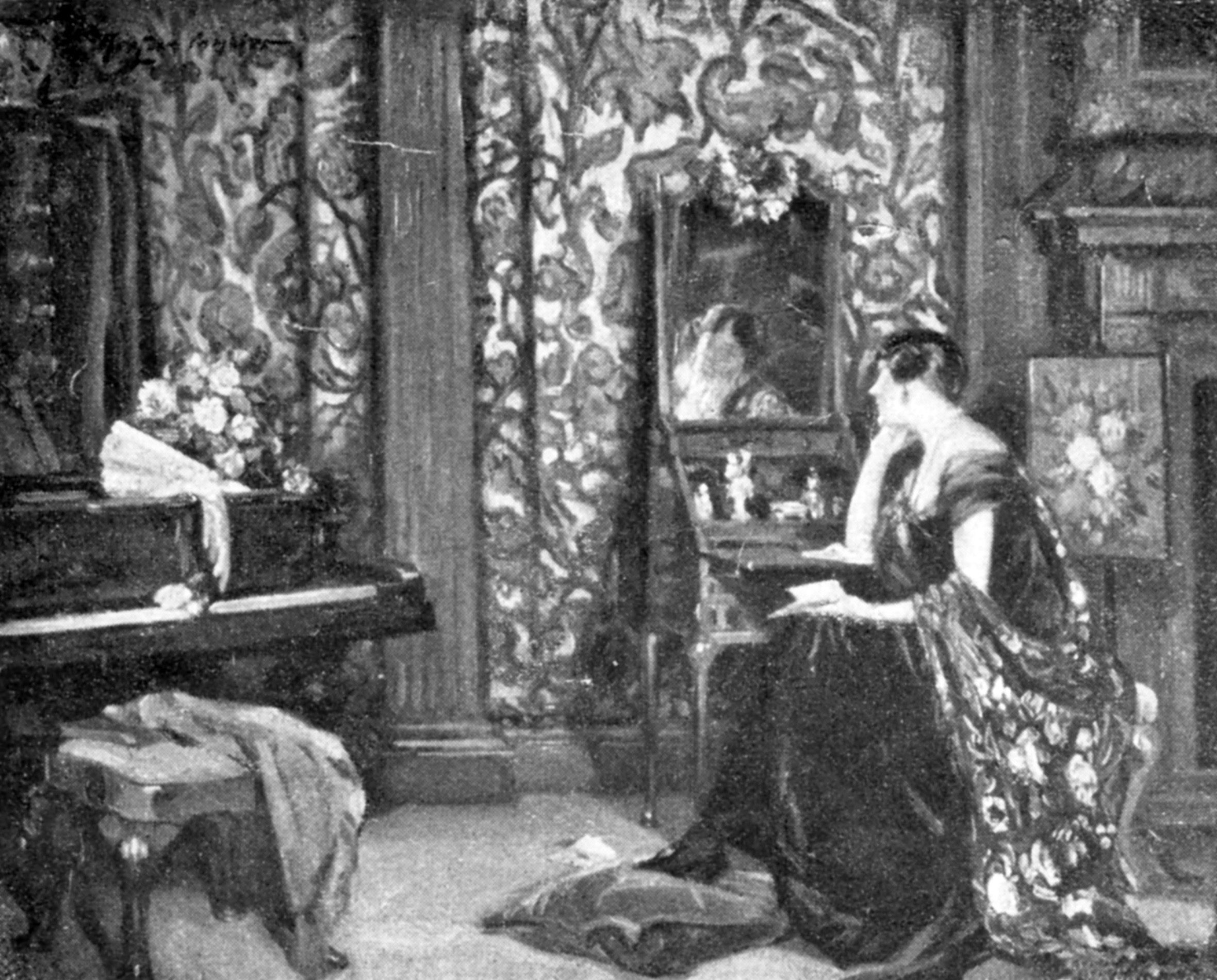
Le Miroir

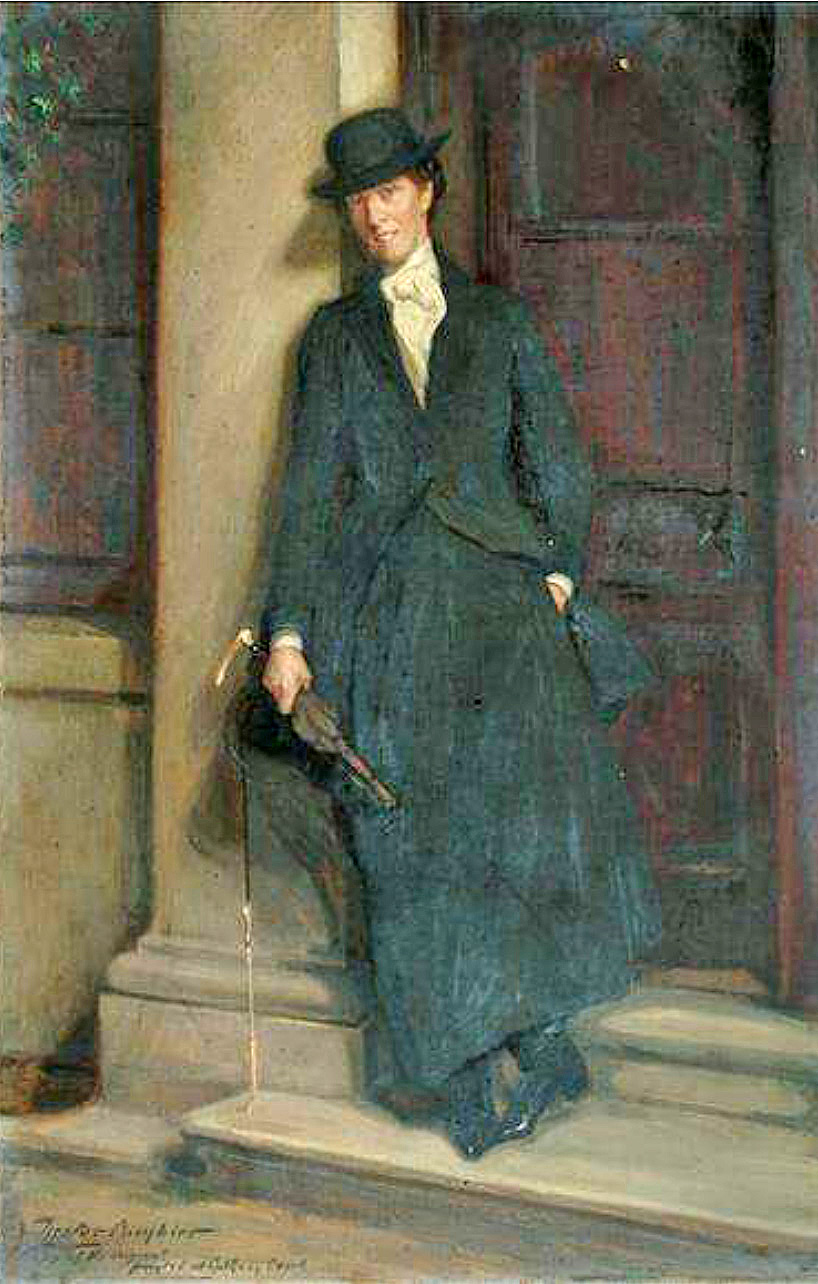
Lady Barber(1916)

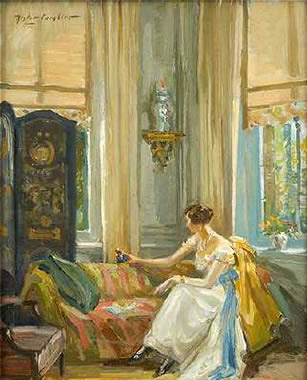
Intérieur

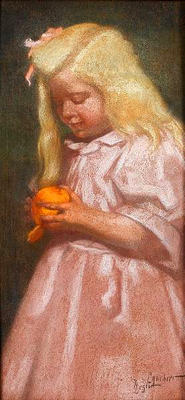
L'enfant à l'orange

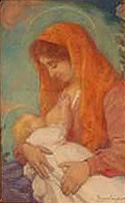
Maternité

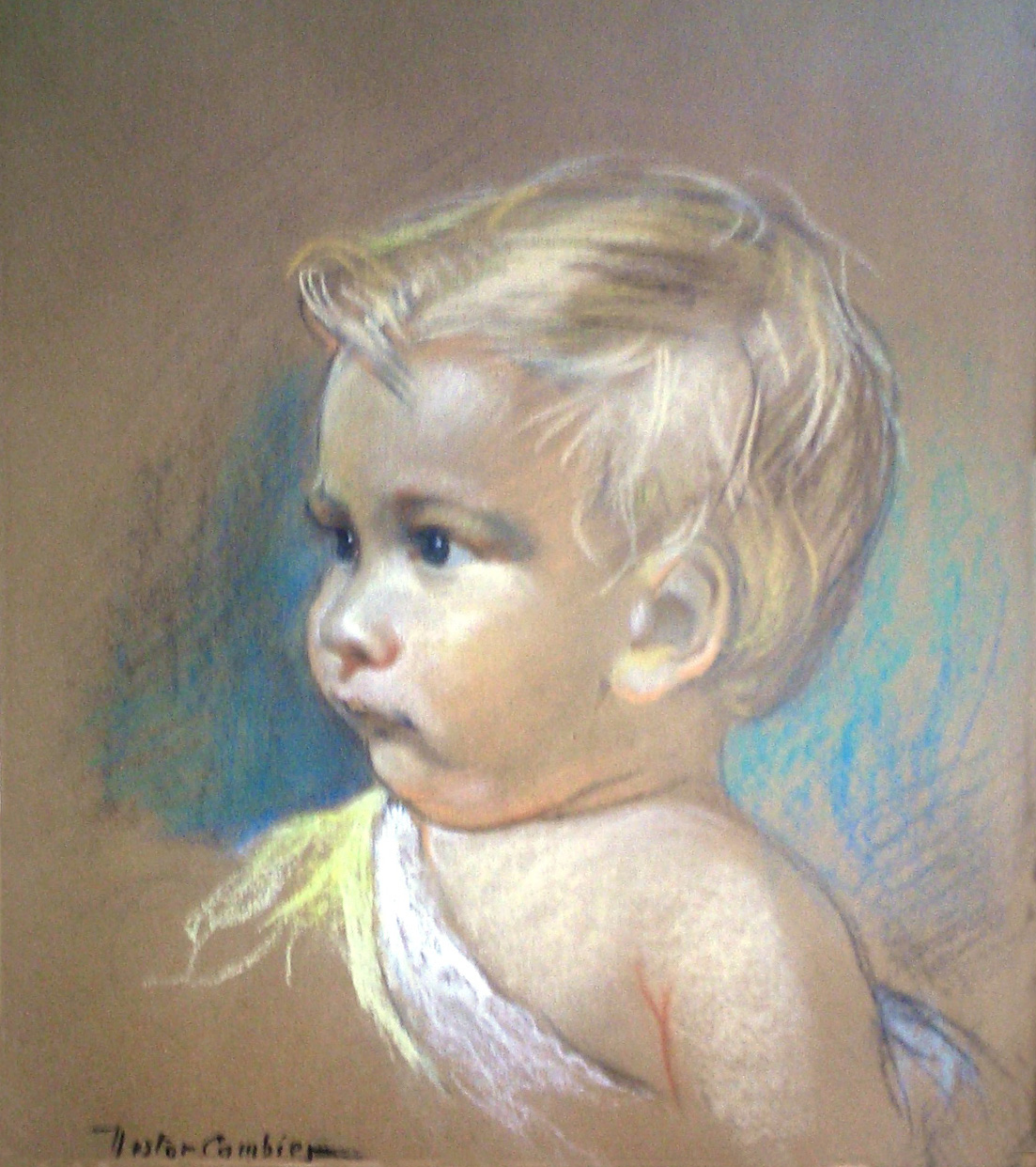
Louis(1924)

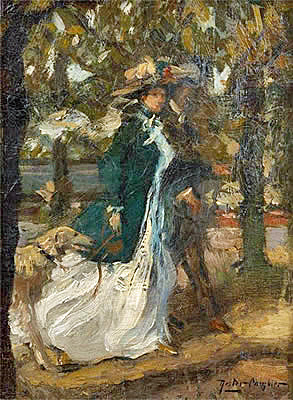
La Promenade

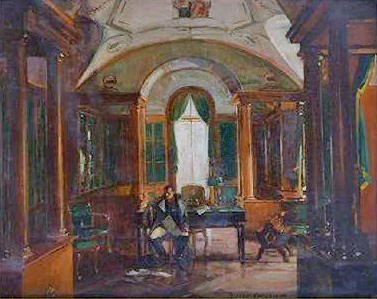
Napoleon à l'interiéure de la bibliothèque de la Malmaison

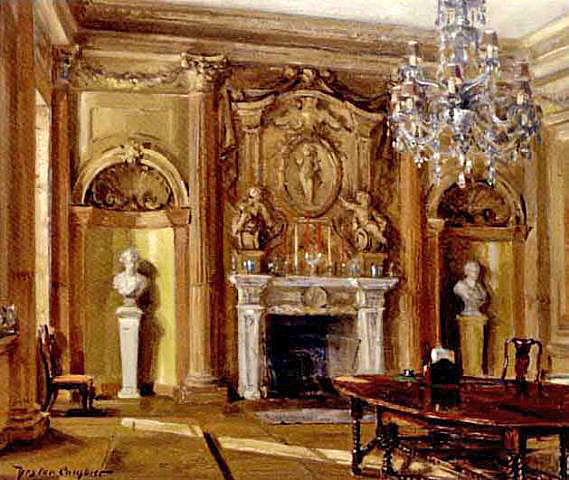
Salon, the Duke of Westminster's House (1930)

Signature of the Artist in charcoal

== Catalogue ==
=== Dated works ===
Source: Paintings held by the Barber Institute of Fine Arts marked *

1900	Portrait of a young girl and a landscape
1901	La Danse de Salome	19.1" x 10.6"	Pastel
1906	Vue du Pont de Brooklyn, New York	15.7" x 23.2"	Oil/canvas
1907	Portraits in the United States
1908	Stained glass for Newark Cathedral, New Jersey, USA
1909	Portrait of Cardinal Mercier, popularised as a print
1910	Portrait of the violinist César Thomson
1911	Portrait of the minister Jules Renkin
1912	Procession in Brabant
1913	Landscape of the surroundings of Durbuy
1914–1923	*15 Portraits of Lady Barber including one of her in a riding-habit, shown at the Royal Academy
1916–1917	*6 paintings of gardens and rock gardens at Culham Court
1917	The Triumph of the Allies, a huge mural for the military institute at Port-Villez (Eure)
1917	*An interior at Culham Court
1917?	Les Blue Bells dans la forêt (Culham Court)
1917?	The dining-room at Culham Court
1917?	*Le Miroir (Culham Court)
1920?	*Portrait of an unidentified widow
1924	Louis (owned by L. Calvete)	13" x 12"	Pastel
1930	Salon at the house of the Duke of Westminster	35.5" x 40.6"	Oil/panel
1930	Drawing dedicated to I.Calvete
1931	* A Flower Piece
1935	Painting of Queen Astrid

=== Undated pictures ===
Source: unless otherwise indicated

Le combat de Kato.	9.1" x 11"	Oil
Napoléon à l'intérieur de la bibliothèque de la Malmaison	14.96" x 18.90"	Oil
Jeune femme en blanc dans un intérieur.	16.54" x 12.60"	Oil
Coin de mon jardin	16" x 12"	Oil
Elégante au jardin	15.7" x 11.8"	Oil
Elégante dans un intérieur	14.2" x 11"	Oil
Fillette assise sur le canapé rouge	18.5" x 14.2"	Oil
La salon de la Comtesse de Bousies á Bruxelles	9.1" x 11.4"	Oil
Le chien au nœud vert	20.1" x 9.8"	Oil
Les baigneuses	11" x 16.3"	Oil
Troupeau de vaches et Moutons dans les ruines	13.4" x 17.3"	Oil
Vallée de la Meuse ensoleillée.	15.4" x 19.3"	Oil
Bord de Meuse	9.1" x 11"	Oil
Vue de Bruges	9.3" x 14.6"	Oil
Le diner este servi	65" x 52"	Oil/Panel
Interior of a church	23.62" x 19.69"	Oil/Panel
Grand place de Bruxelles		Oil/Panel
Church Interior.	23.6" x 19.7"	Panel
Intérieur	19.7" x 25.6"	Panel
L'alcove verte	12".6 x 16.1"	Panel
Intérieur	19.7" x 25.6"	Panel
Intérieur d'Eglise	23.6" x 19.7"	Panel
La Promenade		Oil/Canvas
Dans de jardin de roses	25.2" x 19.7"	Oil/Canvas
Paysage enneigé avec église	32" x 41.2"	Oil/Canvas
Intérieur	12.2" x 11"	Canvas
Intérieur	12.2" x 11"	Canvas
Untitled	25.6" x 21.7"	Painting
Maternité	18.90" x 12.20"	Pastel
L'enfant à l'orange	21.06" x 10.24"	Pastel
Salon of the Belgian Embassy in London	17.3" x 23.6"	Pastel
L'enfant á l'orange	21.3" x 10.2"	Pastel
Park View	5.5" x 8.3	Pastel
L'église de Dave sur Meuse	13" x 10.2"	Drawing
"Forést" (paysage)	5.3" x 7.3"	Drawing
Swans gliding on the water alongside the Saint-Jean Hôpital at Bruges.	(Owned by Mme. Ledieux in Paris?}
Grange de l'Abbaye Ter Doest a Lissewege	13.6" X 15.6"	Charcoal
L'Eglise a Landelies (Charleroi)	15.4" x 13.8"	Crayon
Sans Titre (Femme aux Chaussures Roses)	16.3" x 9.6"	Wash
Sans Titre (Paysage)	13.8" x 15"	Pencil
Sans Titre (Interieur)	11" x 13.2")	Pencil
Vechmael (Limbourg)	15.7" x 13.8"	Crayon
La salon de la Comtesse de Bousies à Bruxelles	23" x 29"
Vue de la Tamise à Londres
The choir of l'Eglise Sta-Croix at Ixelles
Silene drunk held by a faun and a bacchante

Royal Museums of Fine Arts of Belgium, Illustrations of volumes by R. Bazin, Comte Carton de Wiart (Mes Vacances av Congo), Charcot.

Original drawing on the fly leaf of a catalogue. Type Brugeois, portrait sketch in colour pencil ca. 9 x 7 cm.

Vivid portrait sketch made by the artist while visiting the Bruges Salon of 1913–14, made on the fly-leave of the Salon Catalogue: Cercle Artistique Brugeois, XXXVIe Salon, in-8°, 21.5 x 11 cm, stapled, original stiff wrapper. Nestor Cambier was represented by 5 paintings. Of these 4 were marked in red by him with the remark that they were stolen by the Germans at Blankenberg.

=== Undated portraits ===
Baron Cartier de Marchienne, Belgian Ambassador in London
Joe Chamberlain, in the gallery of the Union Committee Room
Sir Douglas Dawson, secretary of the Order of the Garter
Mrs Edward Tchurlow, shown at the Belgian Art Exhibition at Brighton in 1930
Countess Pierrefeu Villeneuve
Baron of Lambert
The Viscounts of Pierrefeu
Sir William Holdsworth, painted at the University of Oxford
The Dean of the Law Faculty at Birmingham.
