= JPMorgan Emerging Europe, Middle East & Africa Securities =

British investment trust

- Type: Public company
- Traded as: LSE: JII
- ISIN: GB0032164732
- Industry: Investment trust
- Founded: 2002; 24 years ago
- Headquarters: 25 Bank Street, Canary Wharf, London, England
- Key people: Eric Sanderson (Chairman)

JPMorgan Emerging Europe, Middle East & Africa Securities, formerly JP Morgan Russian Securities, (LSE: JRS) is a large British investment trust dedicated to investments in Europe, Middle East and Africa. The company is listed on the London Stock Exchange. The chairman is Eric Sanderson.

== History ==
The company was established as JPMorgan Fleming Russia Securities in 2002. Following JPMorgan's decision to drop the Fleming brand, it became JP Morgan Russian Securities in 2006.

Following the Russian invasion of Ukraine in February 2022, the company announced that it would shift its investment strategy towards Emerging Europe, the Middle East and Africa. It adopted its current name in November 2022. In December 2024, the company warned that it may not be able to recover any of its assets in Russia.
