= Brantwood =

English historic house and museum

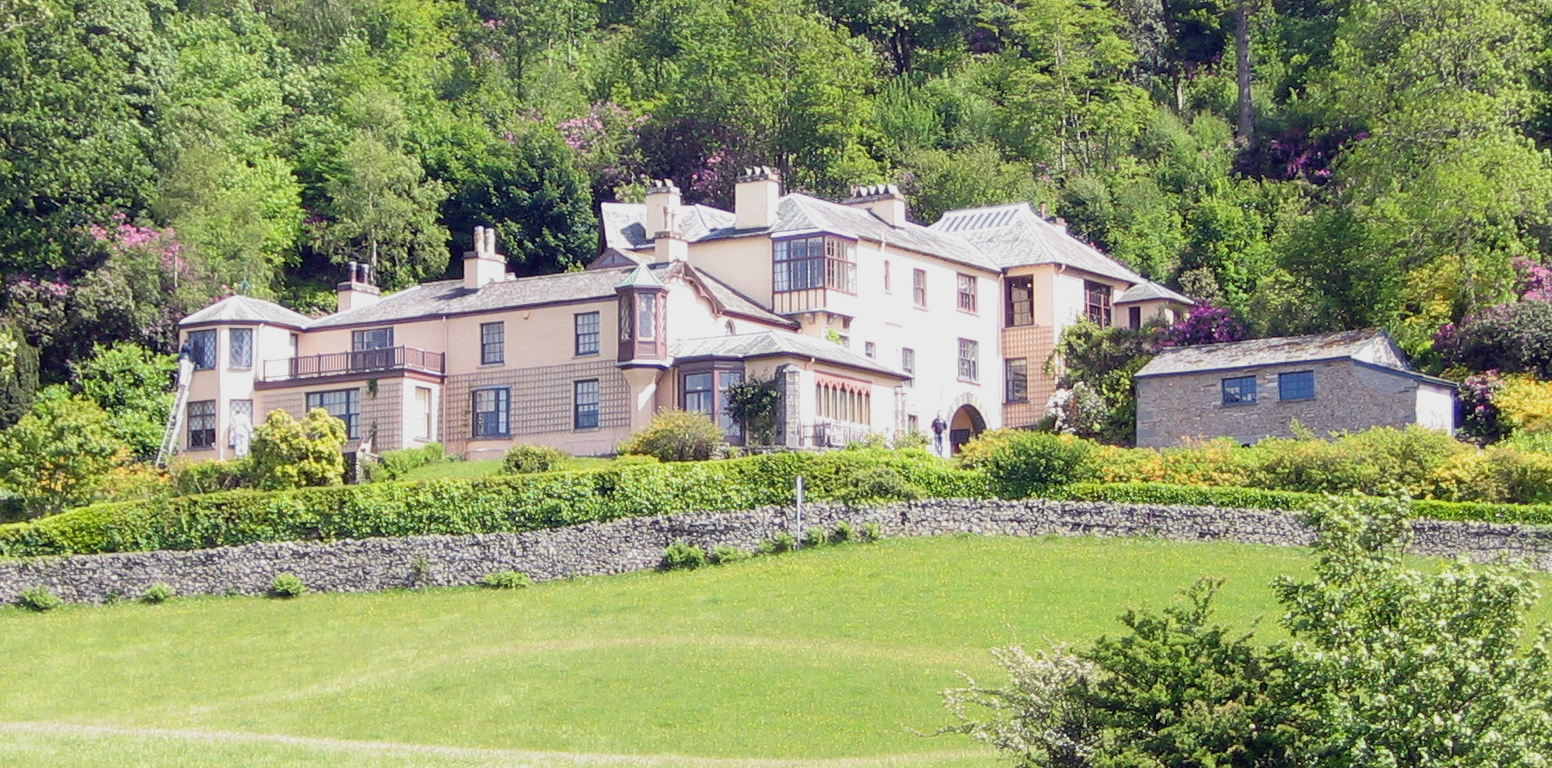
- Photograph taken from the Gondola on Coniston Water

- Location in Cumbria
- 54°21′13″N 3°03′33″W
- Location: Overlooking Coniston Water, Cumbria, England, United Kingdom
- OS grid reference: SD 312 958

History
- Built: Late 18th century
- Built for: Thomas Woodville

Listed Building – Grade II*
- Designated: 25 March 1970
- Reference no.: 1335727

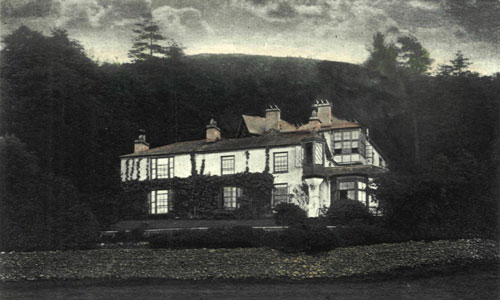
Brantwood. The photo is taken from Lectures on Landscape, by John Ruskin, and dates to circa 1871

Brantwood is a historic house museum in Cumbria, England, overlooking Coniston Water. It has been the home to a number of prominent individuals. The house and grounds are administered by a charitable trust, the house serving as a museum dedicated to John Ruskin, one of its final owners. Brantwood is recorded in the National Heritage List for England as a Grade II* listed building, and several buildings within the grounds are also listed.

== History ==
Brant is an Old Norse word meaning "steep" and the house and grounds are situated on a steep wooded area overlooking the lake. Before the house was built the site was regarded as an "essential viewing point" for early visitors to the Lake District in the 18th century. The original house was built at the end of the 18th century by Thomas Woodville and consisted of between 6 and 8 rooms. After a number of owners, the estate and house were enlarged around 1833. In the middle of the 19th century the resident was Josiah Hudson, father of Charles Hudson who was an Anglican priest and an early mountaineer.

In 1852 the resident was the Victorian wood engraver, poet, artist, book illustrator and social reformer William James Linton who bought the house the following year. Between 1858 and 1864, while Linton was living in London, the house was let to Gerald Massey, poet and Egyptologist. Linton emigrated with his children to America in 1867. In 1869, George William Kitchin, later Dean of Durham Cathedral, took up residence at Brantwood. In 1871 the house was sold to John Ruskin who it is claimed had never previously seen it. However, Kitchin and Ruskin were friends, having met at Oxford, so it is likely he may have had some prior knowledge of the property. Before Ruskin came to Brantwood in the following year, he arranged for repairs to the house, the addition of a turret, the building of a lodge for his valet and his family and for improvements to the garden.

For a short time during his stay at Brantwood, Ruskin held tutorial sessions, what would be called today as teaching seminars. These were held three times each week and each day a different subject was covered, namely Art, Literature and Sociology. His evening assistant when he was absent was a Richard Hosken who had been a former student.

When he was in residence, Ruskin filled the house with art, including paintings by Gainsborough, Turner and the Pre-Raphaelites and a collection of minerals, pottery and sea-shells. Ruskin was joined in the house by Arthur Severn, an artist married to Joan Agnew, his cousin and their growing family. A frequent visitor to the house was William Gershom Collingwood, painter, archaeologist and translator of Nordic sagas who lived nearby. In 1878, a new dining room was built at the south end of the house. A second storey was added around 1890 to provide additional rooms for the Severn family and a studio was built at the rear of the house for the use of Arthur Severn. During this time the estate was also extended.

=== Brantwood Trust ===
Following the death of Ruskin in 1900, the house and estate were inherited by the Severn family. In Ruskin's will, the wish was expressed that the house should be open for 30 days a year for visitors to see his house and collection. However, the Severns did not honour this intention and they sold many of the better pictures. After the death of Arthur Severn in 1931, the remaining contents of the house were sold by auction. Emily Warren, John Ruskin's last pupil, instigated a successful movement to have Brantwood made into a museum. The house was saved for the nation by John Howard Whitehouse, founder of Bembridge School and of the Birmingham Ruskin Society, who bought the house. He established the Brantwood Trust, a registered charity, in 1951 to care for the property for posterity.

== House and grounds ==
The house is listed at Grade II*. The rooms which are open to the public include the drawing room and the dining room. The drawing room still includes Ruskin's secretaire, bookcase and shell-cabinet. The wallpaper is a copy of Ruskin's design, and his drawing of the north porch of St. Mark's, Venice, hangs above the shell-cabinet. Next door is the study where Ruskin worked which contains a painting by Samuel Prout. The dining room, built in 1878, has views over to the Coniston mountains through its seven lancet windows. It contains a portrait of Ruskin aged 3, painted by James Northcote. The old dining room contains some early drawings by Ruskin. Upstairs in the turret is Ruskin's bedroom.

The estate covers around 250 acres (1.0 km^{2}) and includes lakeshore, pasture, oak woods, Japanese maples, and moorland. In the grounds are four more listed buildings. The lodge and former stable are listed at Grade II*. Listed at Grade II are the former coach house and stable, another outbuilding, and an ice house. In the Linton Room in the Linton Building, there is a lithophone, called "The Musical Stones", which visitors may play.

The garden was used by Ruskin to experiment in various forms of cultivation and drainage and it contains a series of steep and winding paths. After his death, more ornamental shrubs and trees were planted. The area then became overgrown until it was rediscovered in the 1980s and it has been much restored since. In 2026 Brantwood participated in the Chelsea Flower Show. The Westmorland Gazette reported that it won a gold medal there in recognition of its National Plant Collection of wisteria.

== See also ==
- Grade II* listed buildings in Westmorland and Furness
- Listed buildings in Coniston, Cumbria
- Ruskin Museum, Coniston
- The Ruskin - Library, Museum and Research Centre
