= John Ruskin School =

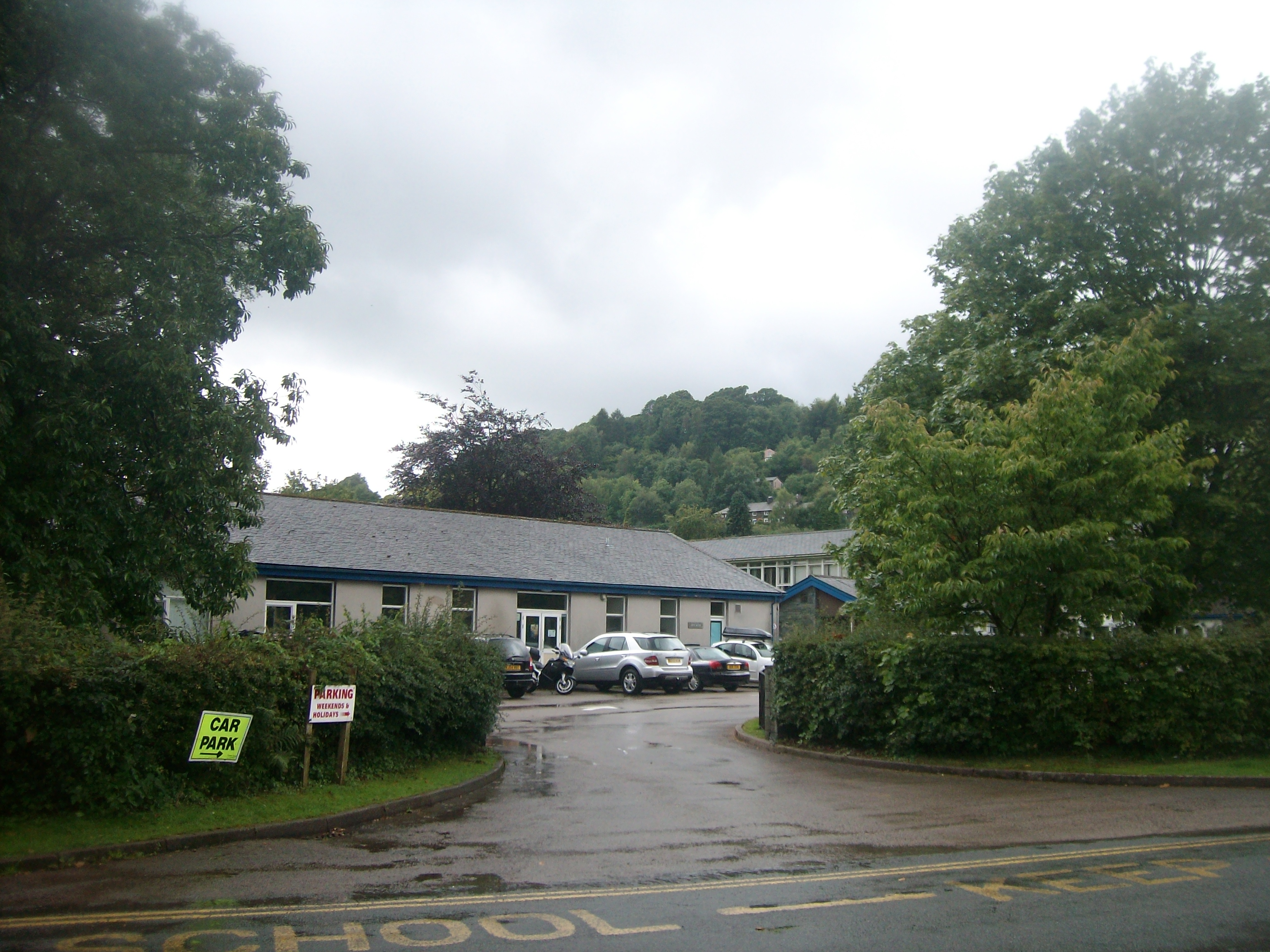

Location
- Lake Road; Coniston, Cumbria, LA21 8EW; England
- Coordinates: 54°22′02″N 3°04′29″W

Information
- Type: Community school
- Local authority: Westmorland and Furness
- Department for Education URN: 112384 Tables
- Ofsted: Reports
- Headteacher: Peter Blackburn
- Gender: Co-educational
- Age: 11 to 16
- Enrolment: 208
- Houses: Brantwood (Alder, Elms, Oaks and Willows) Thurston (Alder, Elms, Oaks and Willows)

John Ruskin School (JRS) is an 11–16 school on Lake Road in Coniston, Cumbria. The school is part of the Rural Academy, a group of nine small schools in Cumbria which was awarded Technology College status in 2004, and a member of the South Lakes Federation of Schools.

According to a 2009 Ofsted report, "It capitalises on its small size by providing a very welcoming and friendly ethos where relationships are very good and students and staff know each other well." It was classed as a good school and was noted for outstanding attendance and behaviour.

== Catchment ==
The school attracts pupils from both the village itself and the surrounding area largely from the respective primary schools of Broughton-in-Furness and Hawkshead. The school has no sixth form, the nearest being at Ulverston Victoria High School, and many choose to go to elsewhere, such as Barrow Sixth Form College, Furness College, Barrow-in-Furness or Kendal College.

== Facilities ==
The school converted the disused garage into a state of the art design facility as part of their design and technology department. It was opened by Tim Farron, local MP, on 10 November 2008. The school is also fully accessible.
