= North British Academy of Arts =

Former art school in Newcastle upon Tyne, England

Coordinates: 54.979°N 1.613°W

The North British Academy of Arts (1908–1924) was an art institution of Newcastle upon Tyne in northern England.

== Overview ==
The academy, later known as the North British Academy of Arts, Science, Literature, and Music, was located in the Claremount Buildings on the western side of Barras Bridge on the corner with Eldon Place in Newcastle upon Tyne, which is now opposite the County Council Offices. Its objectives were initially "for the advancement of art, the encouragement and advantages of its associates and members, and for the creation of local art patriotism and enthusiasm amongst cultured and influential classes of North Britain." They soon evolved to encompass "the betterment of humanity by the advancement of art, literature, science, music, education, law, medicine, manufactures, commerce, agriculture, industries, and, engineering, to the end that the sum of human knowledge may be increased", with the Society organized into ten sections, each presided over by a distinguished specialist. It was founded in 1908, incorporated in 1913, and dissolved in 1924. William James Morgan (1850–1923) was the secretary throughout the life of the academy. At various times, Henry John Brinsley Manners (1852–1925), the 8th Duke of Rutland, was its president. Early on the membership secretary was Frederick Huntley (1887–1960), and curator was William J. Macgarree.

The "Entrance Fee" was two guineas, the "Annual Subscription", one guinea, and "Life Composition", twelve guineas. Annual Meetings were held in September, and exhibitions of members' works normally held twice a year. Members were described as fellows of the academy, and entitled to append F.N.B.A. after their names.

== Exhibitions ==
Eight exhibitions were held by the academy before the Great War.

Exhibition	Location	Town	Dates
1	Academy of Arts Gallery	Newcastle upon Tyne	3–24 Feb 1909
2	Corporation Art Gallery	City of York	24 Jan – 19 Feb 1910
3	Royal Society of British Artists	London	29 Aug – 19 Sep 1910
4	Corporation Art Gallery	City of York	3 Jul – 12 Aug 1911
5	Towneley Hall Art Gallery & Museums	Burnley	5 Mar – 27 Apr 1912
6	Crystal Palace	London	1 Nov – 31 Dec 1912
7	Victoria Institute	Worcester	1 May – 7 Aug 1913
8	Crystal Palace	London	6 Apr – 8 Aug 1914

Works known to have been displayed at these exhibitions include:

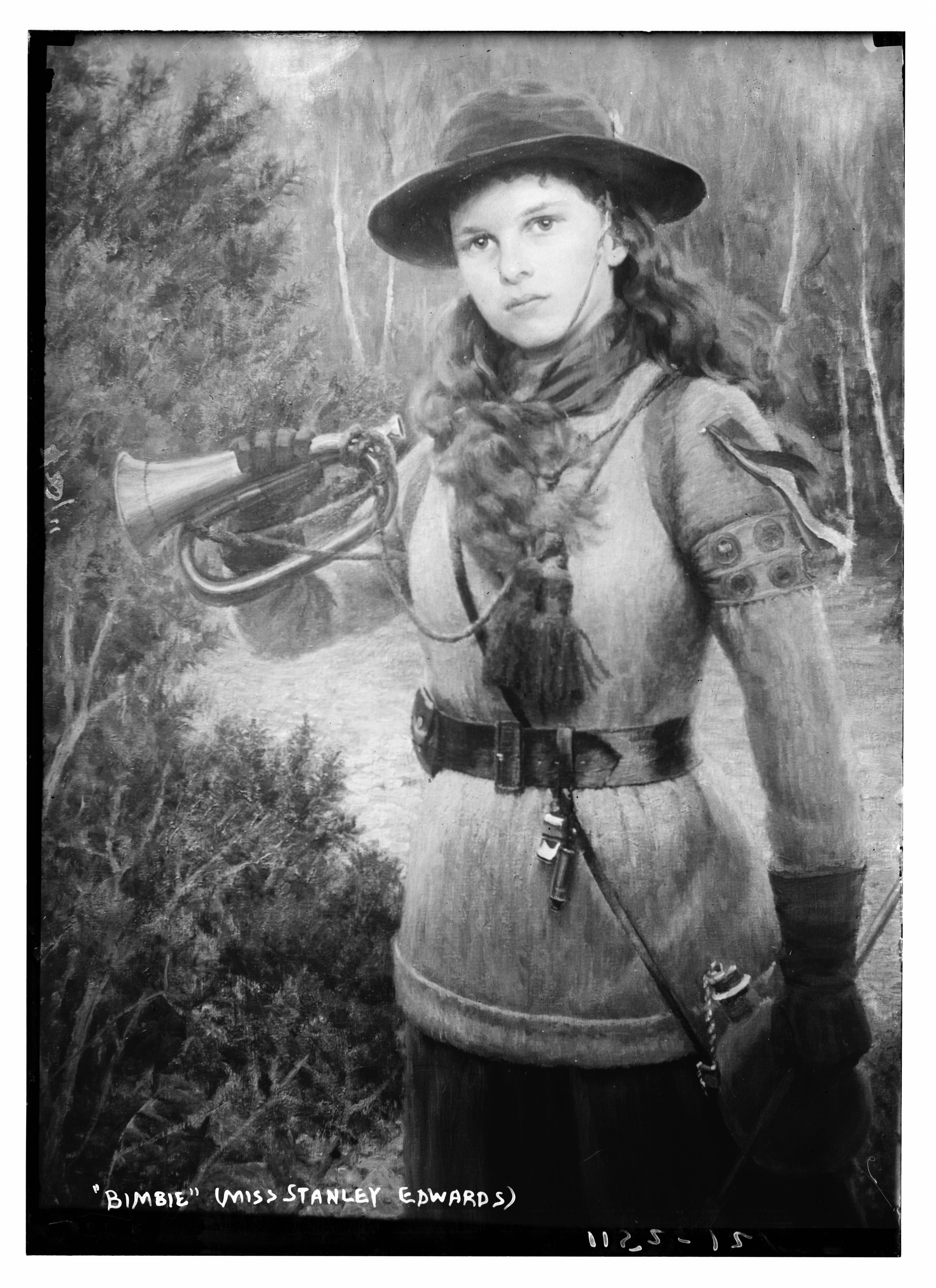
"Sounding a Rally"

- Sounding a Rally – A portrait study of Miss Stanley "Bimbie" Edwards, the first English girl scout, by Philip Homan Miller, which was exhibited in the London exhibition of 1910.
- A Garden in Sark – A watercolour painting by Frances Anne Hopkins, which was exhibited in the York exhibition of 1910.

== Members ==
Notable men and women were invited to become members, including:

- A. Bailey (l. 1910) – Australian MLA.
- Alfred Milner, 1st Viscount Milner (b.1854 d.1925) – British statesman, colonial administrator and High Commissioner in South Africa.
- Arthur Balfour (b. 1848 d. 1930) – British Conservative Prime Minister and Foreign Secretary.
- Charles Francis Brush (b. 1849 d. 1929) – American pioneer in the commercial development of electricity.
- Chow Cheong Ling (b. 1861 d. 1959) – Chinese: 周长龄; pinyin: Zhou Chang Ling; also Chow Shouson – Chinese diplomat, district customs officer, company & charity director, merchant & Member of the Legislative Council (Hong Kong).
- Edward Enoch Anderson (b. 1878 d. 1961) – Yorkshire artist of the Staithes group elected to honorary membership in 1909 and later became vice-president.
- Ernest Christie (b. 1863 d. 1937) – Surrey painter.
- Frances Anne Hopkins (b. 1838 d. 1919) – Canadian and British painter who exhibited at the York Exhibition of 1910.
- Francis Henry Lenygon (b. 1877 d. 1943) – Decorator and furnisher in London and New York NY.
- Frederick Barnett Kilmer (b. 1851 d. 1934) – Pharmacist, author, public health activist and director of Scientific Laboratories for Johnson & Johnson 1889–1934.
- Frederick Huntley (b. 1887 d. 1960) – Membership secretary for the society.
- Frederick Roberts, 1st Earl Roberts (b. 1832 d. 1914) – British soldier and field marshal.
- Georgina Bainsmith (b. 1858 d. 1937) – Cornish sculptor, also elected a fellow and councilor.
- Henry Robinson Hall (b. 1859 d. 1927) – Lancastrian, Yorkshire and Northumbrian painter, from 1910.
- James William Lowber (b. 1847 d. 1930) – Anthropologist of Austin Texas, also elected a fellow and councilor in 1910.
- Jeme Tien Yow (b. 1861 d. 1919) – Chinese: 詹天佑; pinyin: Zhan Tain You; also Jeme Tien Yau – Chinese naval officer, railway engineer & mandarin elected member in 1909.
- Joseph Baynes (b. 1842 d. 1925) – Pioneer of the dairy industry and MLC of Natal, South Africa.
- Lillian Heatley (b. 1880 d. 1942) – Wife of painter Harold Swanwick
- Maisie Strobel (l. 1924) – Succeeded as secretary after the death of William James Morgan, and oversaw the winding up of the Society.
- Nestor Cambier (b. 1879 d. 1957) – Belgium painter and draftsman, from 1923.
- Philip Homan Miller (b. 1845 d. 1928) – Irish artist who exhibited in the 1910 exhibition.
- Ralph Adams Cram (b. 1863 d. 1942) – American architect of collegiate and ecclesiastical buildings.
- Robert Lorimer (b. 1864 d. 1929) – Scottish architect.
- Jehangir Hormusji Kothari (b. 1857 d. 1934) – Urdu: جهانگیر هورموسجی کوٹهاری – Entitled Indian of Karachi, honorary special magistrate, civil government, philanthropist, holder of the Gold Kaisar-i-Hind Medal (first class) & world traveller.
- Thomas Phillips Honey (b. 1878) – Financier, banker and company director.
- William J. Macgarree (l. 1909) – Curator for the society.
- William James Morgan (b. 1849 d. 1923) – Secretary throughout the life of the Society.
- William Joseph Napier (b.1857 d.1925) – Liberal Party Member of Parliament for Auckland, New Zealand (1899–1902) and elected a fellow of the Society in 1910.
- Zhan Tianyou (b. 1861 d. 1919) –Renowned Chinese railway engineer.

A list of members can be found in the first Exhibition Catalog.

== Publications ==
Publications by the academy included:

- Inaugural Address by Sir William Blake Richmond.
- Journal and Transactions of the N.B.A (1909–1913).
- Annual Report (1918, 1921, 1922, 1923).
- Catalogue of the Pictures Exhibited by Members at the Different Exhibitions Held During the Year (1918, 1921, 1922, 1923).

And also

- Jeffrey Marden, Surgeon – A Novel by E.N. Blamey (1913).
- Exhibition Catalogues (1909, 1910, 1911, 1912, 1914).

== Awards ==
A gold medal and honorary fellowship were offered in 1909 to the first British aviator who flew a British-made machine between Newcastle and London to encourage the fledgling British aviation industry.

A gardening competition was established in 1910 to foster a love of nature and beauty amongst school children, so that the homes of the poor might be beautified and the young provided with an innocent and interesting hobby. Initially there were 2,761 child gardeners at work in the slums of Newcastle upon Tyne, competing for prizes to a total of 50 guineas with the academy providing the seeds. Their window boxes and flower pots were to be exhibited and judged in one of the school halls of the city in September of the following year. It was intended to extend the competition to London and other cities and towns of the United Kingdom, with school principals in North Britain being asked to encourage their charges to enter the competition.

Scholarships were provided for talented poor students in the arts, music, painting, literature, etc.
