= Henry Robinson Hall =

English painter

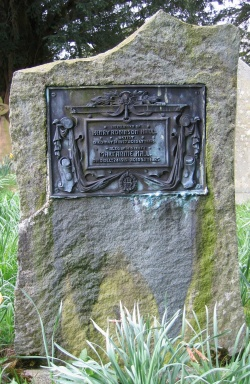
- Grave marker
- Born: 6 April 1859; York
- Died: 31 May 1927 (aged 68); Barrow-in-Furness
- Resting place: Coniston
- Known for: Highland cattle
- Spouse: Mary Annie née Bleasdale

Henry Robinson Hall (1859–1927) was a Victorian and Edwardian landscape painter in oils and watercolours noted for his Highland cattle.

== Life ==
Hall was born to Eliza Robinson in the City of York in 1859 and died on 31 May 1927 at Barrow-in-Furness. He lived in the City of York, Elswick, Blackpool, Woodland, Coniston and Barrow-in-Furness, and married Mary Annie née Bleasdale. He is buried in the yard of St. Andrews parish church at Coniston.

Hall was a painter who exhibited at the Royal Academy in 1902 and was a fellow of the North British Academy of Arts.

Hall's known works include:

- A Cattle Raid in the Highlands (1890).
- Coniston Lake from Lake Bank (nd).
- Denizen of the Highlands (nd).
- Drover with Cows by Lake Buttermere Evening (nd).
- Evening Glow (1902)
- Highland Cattle (nd).
- Highland Cattle above Loch Maree (nd).
- Highland Cattle, Isle of Skye (nd).
- The Ghyll, Coniston, Cumbria (nd).
- The Home of the Golden Eagle (nd).
- The Young Falconer (nd).
