= Coniston, Cumbria =

Coordinates: 54.368°N 3.073°W

Coniston
- Village and parish
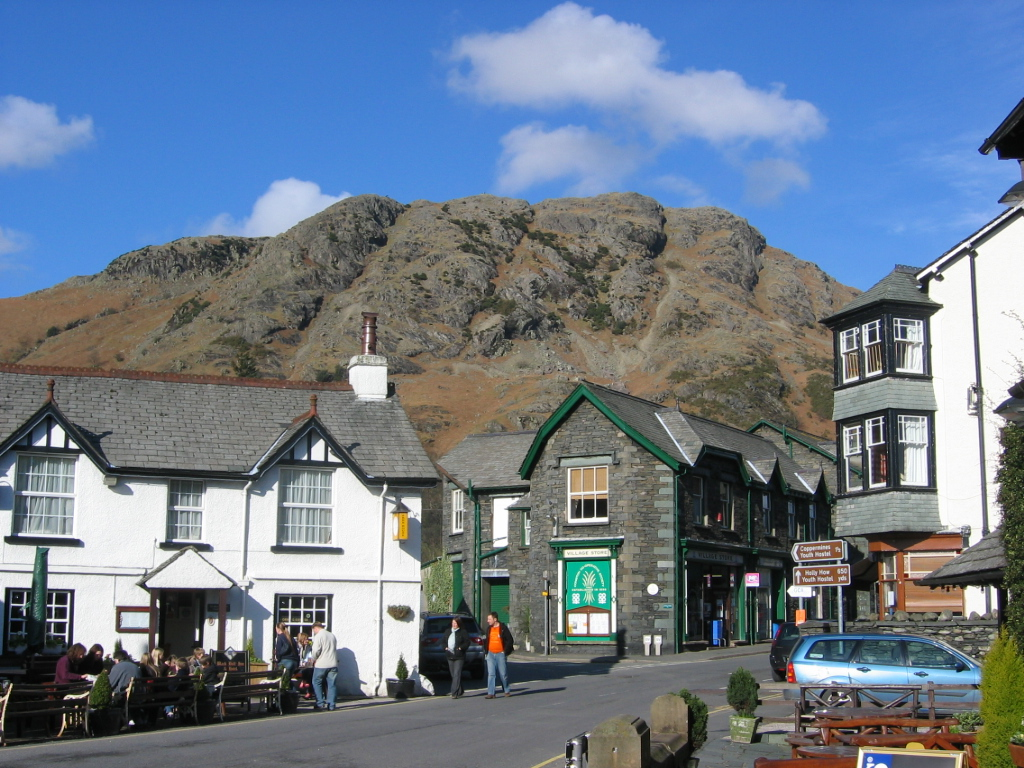
- Coniston

- Location within Cumbria
- Population: 928 (2011)
- OS grid reference: SD2996
- Civil parish: Coniston
- Unitary authority: Westmorland and Furness
- Ceremonial county: Cumbria
- Region: North West
- Country: England
- Sovereign state: United Kingdom
- Post town: CONISTON
- Postcode district: LA21
- Dialling code: 015394
- Police: Cumbria
- Fire: Cumbria
- Ambulance: North West
- UK Parliament: Westmorland and Lonsdale

Coniston is a village and civil parish in the Westmorland and Furness district of Cumbria, England. In the 2001 census the parish had a population of 1,058, decreasing at the 2011 census to 928. Within the boundaries of the historic county of Lancashire, it is in the southern part of the Lake District National Park, between Coniston Water, the third longest lake in the Lake District, and Coniston Old Man.

Coniston is 25 miles (40 km) northeast of Barrow-in-Furness, 20 miles (32 km) west of Kendal and 42 miles (68 km) north of Lancaster.

== Toponymy ==
The village's name is derived from konungr, the Old Norse for king, and tūn the Old English for farmstead or village, meaning the "King's estate"; Ekwall it is speculated that this settlement could have been the centre of a 'small Scandinavian mountain kingdom'. By the 12th century, it was known as "Coningeston".

== History ==
Coniston grew as both a farming village, and to serve local copper and slate mines. It grew in popularity as a tourist location during the Victorian era, thanks partially to the construction of a branch of the Furness Railway, which opened to passenger traffic in 1859 and terminated at Coniston railway station.

The poet and social critic John Ruskin also popularised the village, buying the mansion Brantwood on the eastern side of Coniston Water in 1871. Before his death, he rejected the option to be buried in Westminster Abbey, instead being laid to rest in the churchyard of St Andrew's, Coniston. Ruskin Museum, established in 1901, is both a memorial to Ruskin and a local museum covering the history and heritage of Coniston Water and the Lake District.

The philosopher R. G. Collingwood is buried in Coniston.

The painter Henry Robinson Hall lived and worked and was buried in Coniston.

Donald Campbell added to the profile of the village and lake when he broke four World Water Speed Records on the lake in the 1950s. He died attempting to break the world water speed record for the eighth time in 1967, when his jet boat, "Bluebird K7", crashed at 290 mph (470 km/h), having already set the record for the seventh time at Dumbleyung Lake, Western Australia in 1964. His body and boat (Bluebird K7) were discovered and recovered by divers in 2001 and he was buried in the new graveyard in Coniston in September 2001. A new wing has been built at the Ruskin Museum to accommodate the fully restored Bluebird K7 boat. It opened in late 2009 with the K7 due to have arrived in late 2011 or early 2012.

The whole village was powered by hydroelectricity during the 1920s but this became so heavily taxed that the people there were forced to return to the national grid. Since 7 March 2007 a hydro-electric scheme has been in use to power up to 300 homes; being sited near the original.

== Geography ==
Coniston is located on the western shore of the northern end of Coniston Water. It sits at the mouth of Coppermines Valley and Yewdale Beck, which descend from the Coniston Fells, historically the location of ore and slate mining. Coniston's location thus developed as a farming village and transport hub, serving these areas. Coniston was situated in the very north-west of the historic county of Lancashire, with Coniston Old Man forming the county's highest point.

=== Mining ===
Two slate quarries still operate at Coniston, one in Coppermines Valley, the other at Brossen Stone on the east side of the Coniston Old Man. Both work Coniston's volcanic slates, being blue at Low-Brandy Crag in Coppermines Valley, and light green at Brossen Stone (bursting stone). The scenery around Coniston derives from Coniston Limestone and rocks of the Borrowdale Volcanic Group.

== Governance ==
Coniston is part of the Westmorland and Lonsdale parliamentary constituency, of which Tim Farron is the current MP representing the Liberal Democrats.

Before Brexit, it was in the North West England European Parliamentary Constituency.

For Local Government purposes, Coniston is in the Coniston and Hawkshead ward of Westmorland and Furness Council.

The total population of this ward as taken at the 2011 Census was 1,575.

The village also has its own Parish Council.

== Leisure and tourism ==
The creation of the Lake District National Park in 1951 provided a boost to tourism, with attractions such as the Ruskin Museum and ferry services across the lake developing. Coniston is a popular spot for hill-walking and rock-climbing; there are fine walks to be had on the nearby Furness Fells and Grizedale Forest, and some of the finest rock in the Lake District on the eastern face of Dow Crag, 3 miles (4.8 km) from the village. The Grizedale Stages rally also takes place in Coniston, using the surrounding Grizedale and Broughton Moor (or Postlethwaite Allotment) forests. The village is also home to a number of hotels and two youth hostels, one at the edge of the village, the other in the nearby Coppermines Valley.

The village also has a football team, Coniston AFC, who play their home games at Coniston sports and social centre.

== Transport ==
As of March 2026 the main bus service in Coniston is a Stagecoach Cumbria service 505 which goes to Ambleside, Windermere and occasionally Kendal.

== Climate ==
As with the rest of the British Isles, Coniston experiences a maritime climate with cool summers and mild winters. Rainfall is high, almost at 2,000 millimetres (79 in) a year. Temperature extremes have ranged from −15.2 °C (4.6 °F) during February 1986, to 30.3 °C (86.5 °F) during August 1990. The nearest Met Office weather station is Grizedale, around 2.5 miles (4.0 km) to the South East.

Climate data for Grizedale: 91 m (299 ft) 1991–2020 normals, extremes 1960–2007
Month	Jan	Feb	Mar	Apr	May	Jun	Jul	Aug	Sep	Oct	Nov	Dec	Year
Record high °C (°F)	12.2 (54.0)	14.0 (57.2)	19.4 (66.9)	24.9 (76.8)	26.5 (79.7)	29.8 (85.6)	30.2 (86.4)	30.3 (86.5)	26.7 (80.1)	21.7 (71.1)	16.4 (61.5)	13.0 (55.4)	30.3 (86.5)
Mean daily maximum °C (°F)	6.9 (44.4)	7.4 (45.3)	9.2 (48.6)	12.0 (53.6)	15.4 (59.7)	17.5 (63.5)	19.6 (67.3)	19.2 (66.6)	16.8 (62.2)	12.9 (55.2)	9.5 (49.1)	7.0 (44.6)	12.8 (55.0)
Daily mean °C (°F)	3.8 (38.8)	4.1 (39.4)	5.6 (42.1)	7.7 (45.9)	10.5 (50.9)	12.9 (55.2)	15.0 (59.0)	14.5 (58.1)	12.3 (54.1)	9.1 (48.4)	6.2 (43.2)	3.9 (39.0)	8.8 (47.8)
Mean daily minimum °C (°F)	0.6 (33.1)	0.8 (33.4)	2.0 (35.6)	3.2 (37.8)	5.6 (42.1)	8.2 (46.8)	10.4 (50.7)	9.8 (49.6)	7.9 (46.2)	5.4 (41.7)	2.8 (37.0)	0.8 (33.4)	4.8 (40.6)
Record low °C (°F)	−14.4 (6.1)	−15.2 (4.6)	−12.2 (10.0)	−6.2 (20.8)	−6.9 (19.6)	−2.6 (27.3)	1.1 (34.0)	−1.1 (30.0)	−1.7 (28.9)	−5.9 (21.4)	−9.8 (14.4)	−14.2 (6.4)	−15.2 (4.6)
Average precipitation mm (inches)	208.7 (8.22)	182.1 (7.17)	169.6 (6.68)	121.5 (4.78)	111.4 (4.39)	105.3 (4.15)	112.5 (4.43)	137.4 (5.41)	148.8 (5.86)	224.7 (8.85)	218.1 (8.59)	239.3 (9.42)	1,977.8 (77.87)
Average precipitation days	17.6	15.2	15.8	14.5	12.6	13.5	12.7	13.8	14.1	17.9	19.5	17.9	185.1
Source 1: Météo Climat
Source 2: KNMI (extremes)

Climate data for Grizedale 91m asl, 1971–2000, Extremes 1960– (Weather Station 2.5 mi (4 km) SE of Coniston)
Month	Jan	Feb	Mar	Apr	May	Jun	Jul	Aug	Sep	Oct	Nov	Dec	Year
Record high °C (°F)	12.2 (54.0)	14.0 (57.2)	19.4 (66.9)	24.9 (76.8)	26.5 (79.7)	29.8 (85.6)	30.1 (86.2)	30.3 (86.5)	26.7 (80.1)	21.7 (71.1)	16.4 (61.5)	13.0 (55.4)	30.3 (86.5)
Mean daily maximum °C (°F)	6.2 (43.2)	6.6 (43.9)	8.6 (47.5)	11.3 (52.3)	15.0 (59.0)	17.2 (63.0)	19.2 (66.6)	18.8 (65.8)	16.0 (60.8)	12.8 (55.0)	9.1 (48.4)	7.1 (44.8)	12.3 (54.2)
Mean daily minimum °C (°F)	0.2 (32.4)	0.4 (32.7)	1.5 (34.7)	2.6 (36.7)	4.8 (40.6)	7.7 (45.9)	9.8 (49.6)	9.6 (49.3)	7.8 (46.0)	5.1 (41.2)	2.4 (36.3)	1.0 (33.8)	4.4 (39.9)
Record low °C (°F)	−14.4 (6.1)	−15.2 (4.6)	−12.2 (10.0)	−6 (21)	−6.9 (19.6)	−2.6 (27.3)	1.1 (34.0)	−1.1 (30.0)	−1.7 (28.9)	−5.9 (21.4)	−9.8 (14.4)	−14.2 (6.4)	−15.2 (4.6)
Average precipitation mm (inches)	199.48 (7.85)	147.56 (5.81)	171.31 (6.74)	97.43 (3.84)	89.89 (3.54)	102.37 (4.03)	114.14 (4.49)	142.84 (5.62)	156.36 (6.16)	208.18 (8.20)	196.1 (7.72)	214.35 (8.44)	1,902.57 (74.90)
Source 1: YR.NO
Source 2: Royal Dutch Meteorological Institute

== Services ==
Coniston is also an important local centre, with a secondary school (John Ruskin School), primary school (Coniston Church of England Primary School), bank, petrol station and other such services. It has also repeatedly been highly placed in the Village of the Year award, winning it in 1997.

== Twinning ==
The village is twinned with Illiers-Combray. The French village is associated with Marcel Proust for whom Ruskin's work was a source of inspiration.

== Gallery ==
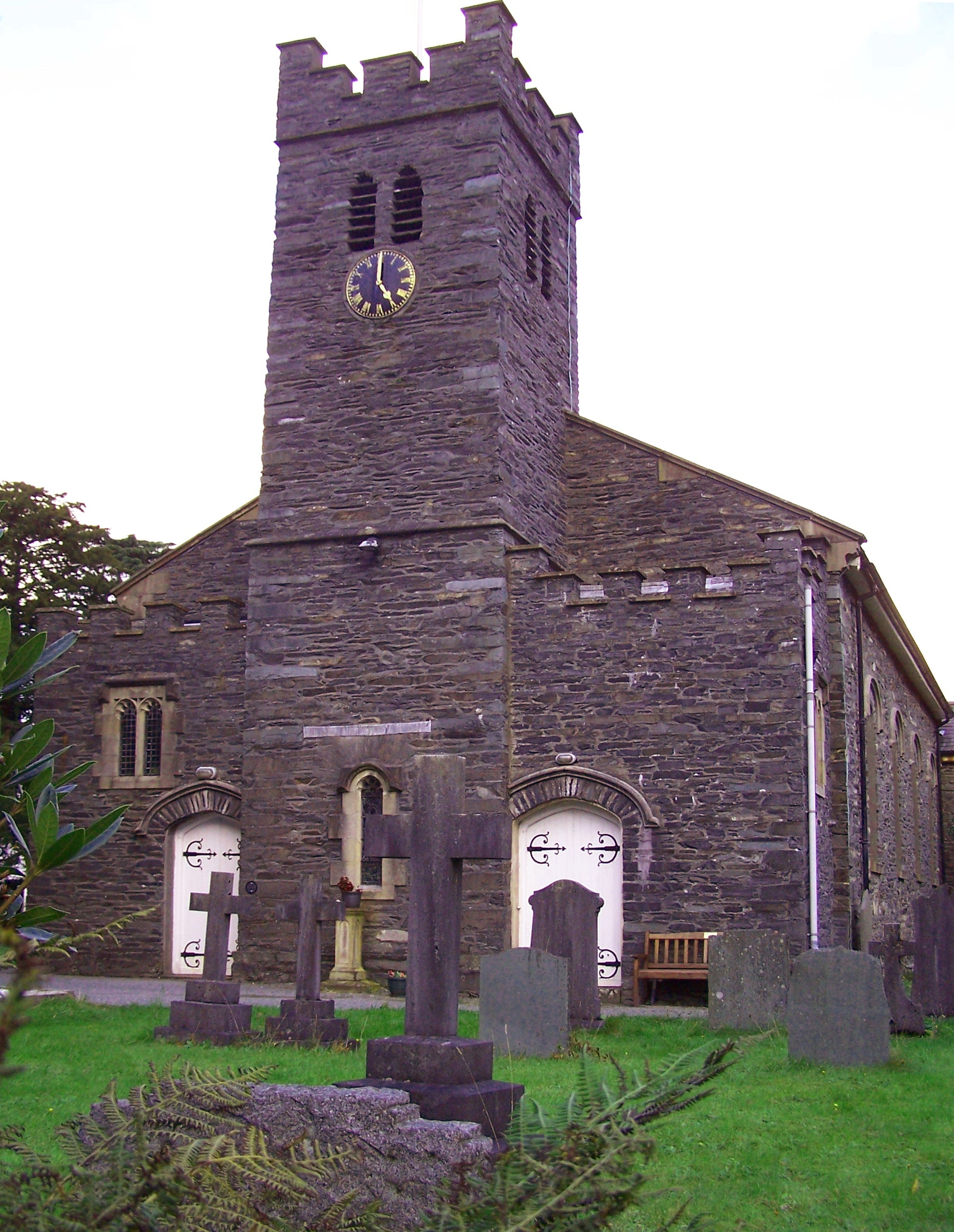
St Andrew's Church

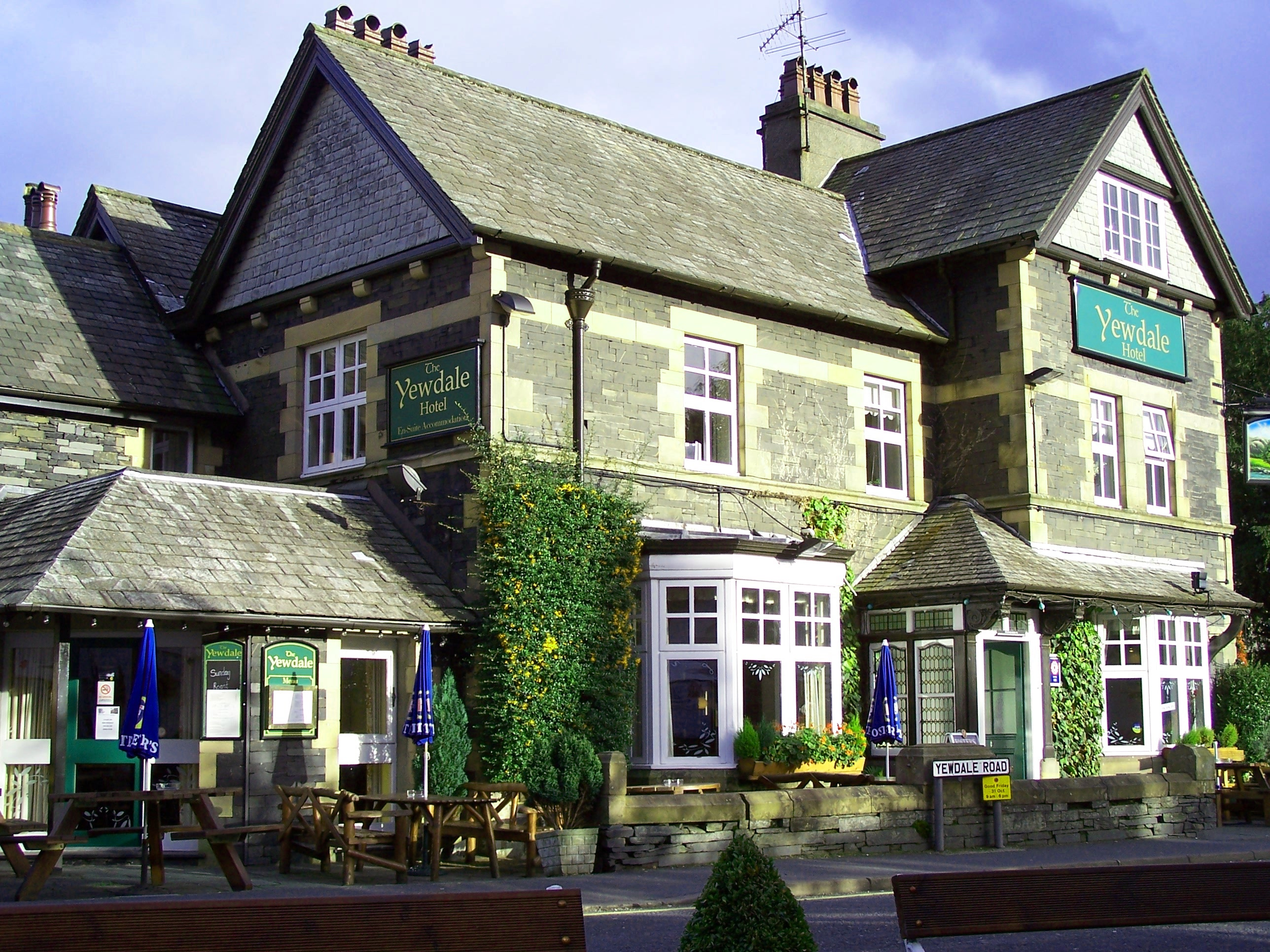
Yewdale Hotel

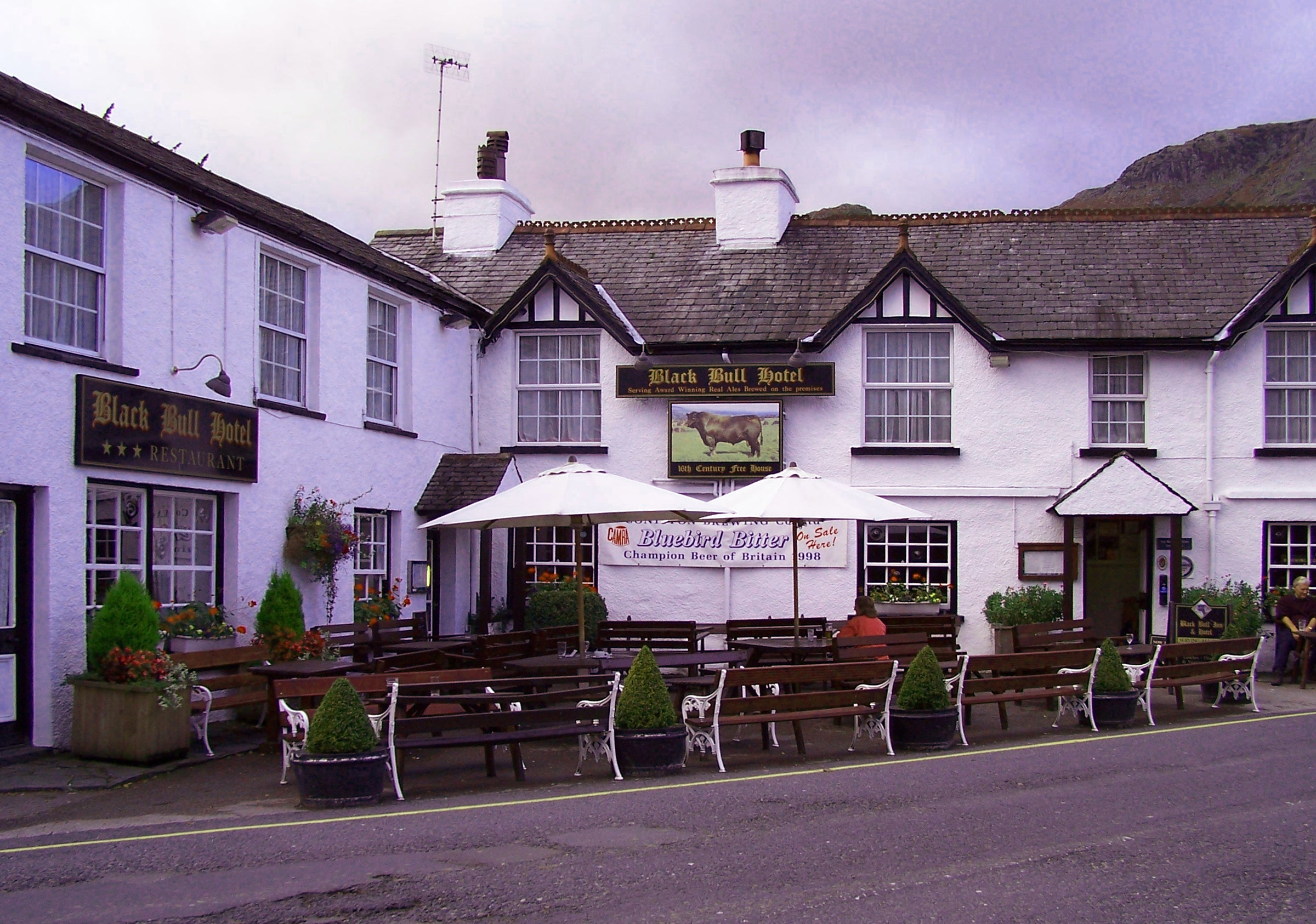
Black Bull

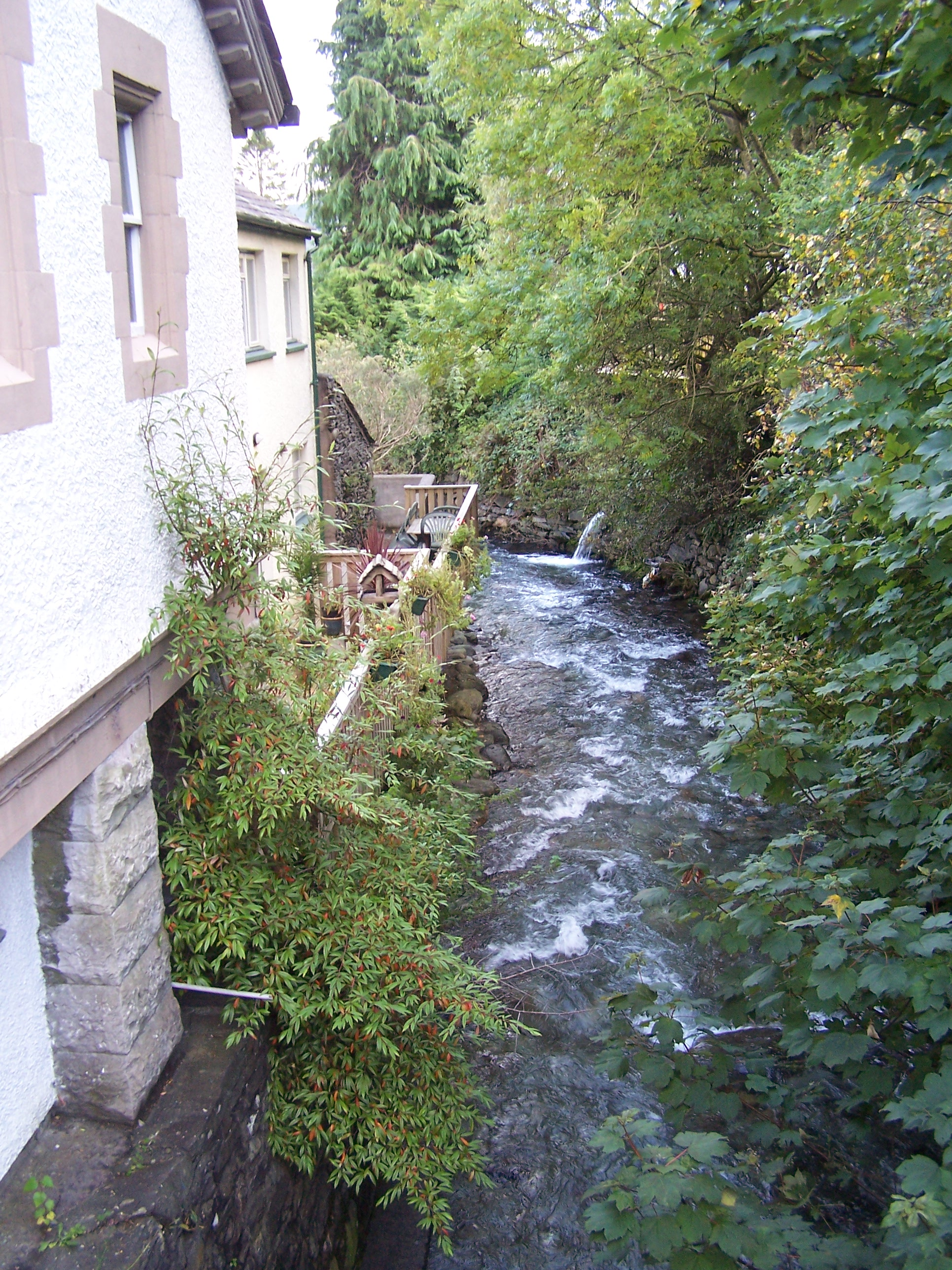
Church Beck

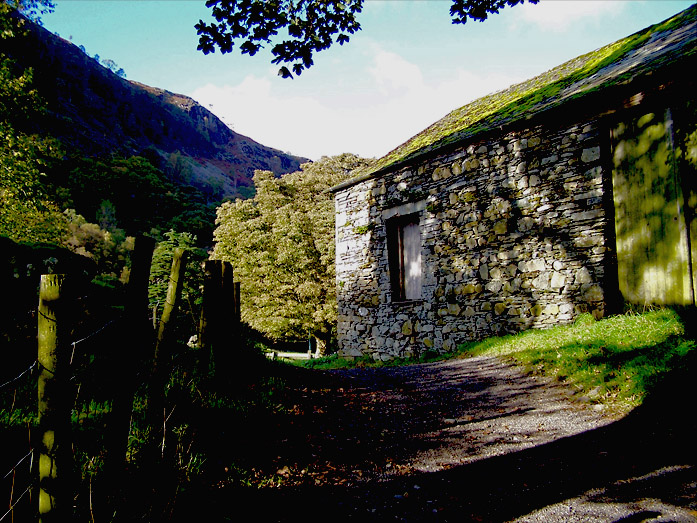
Farmstead near Coniston

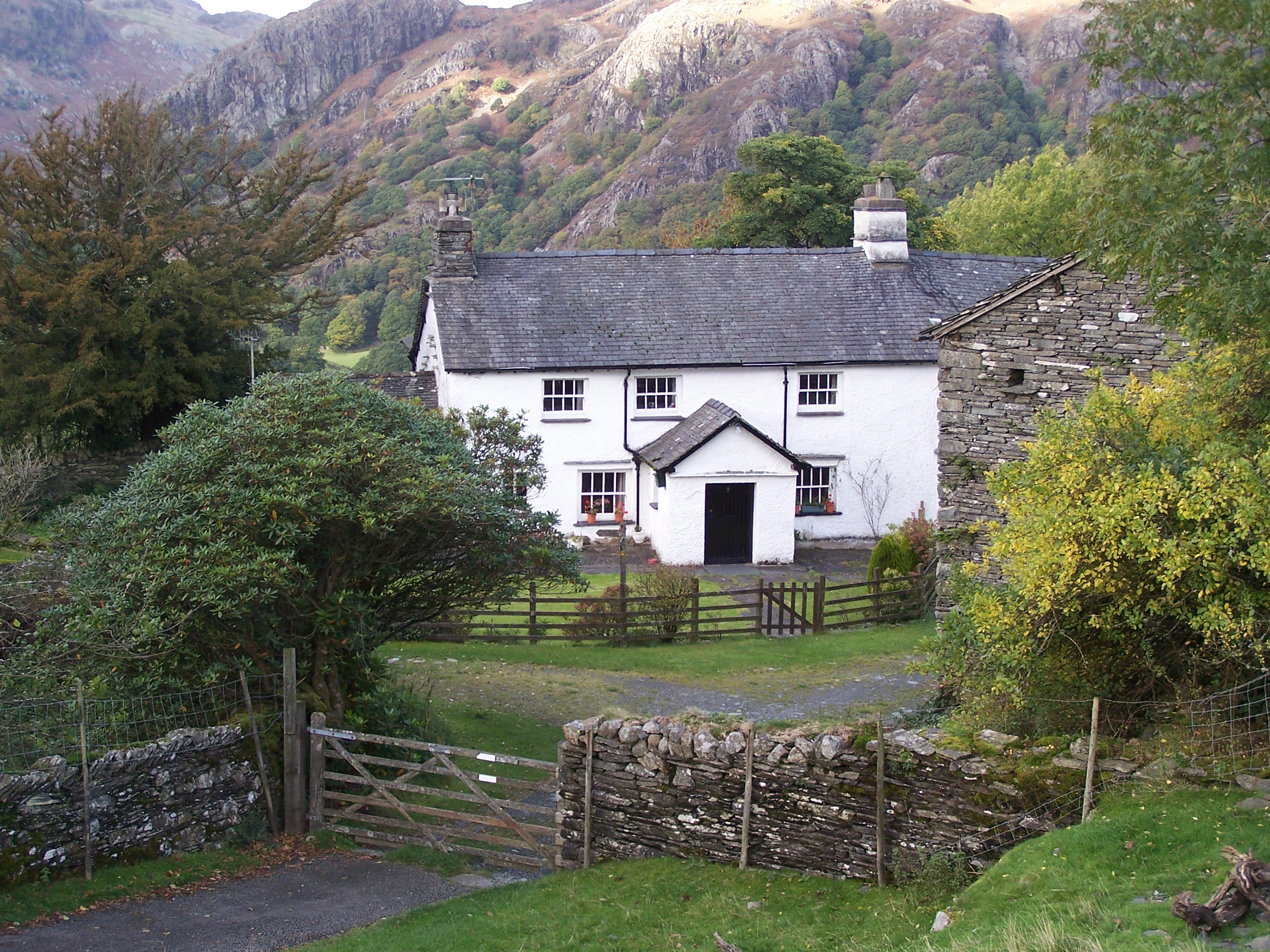
Tarn Hows Cottage

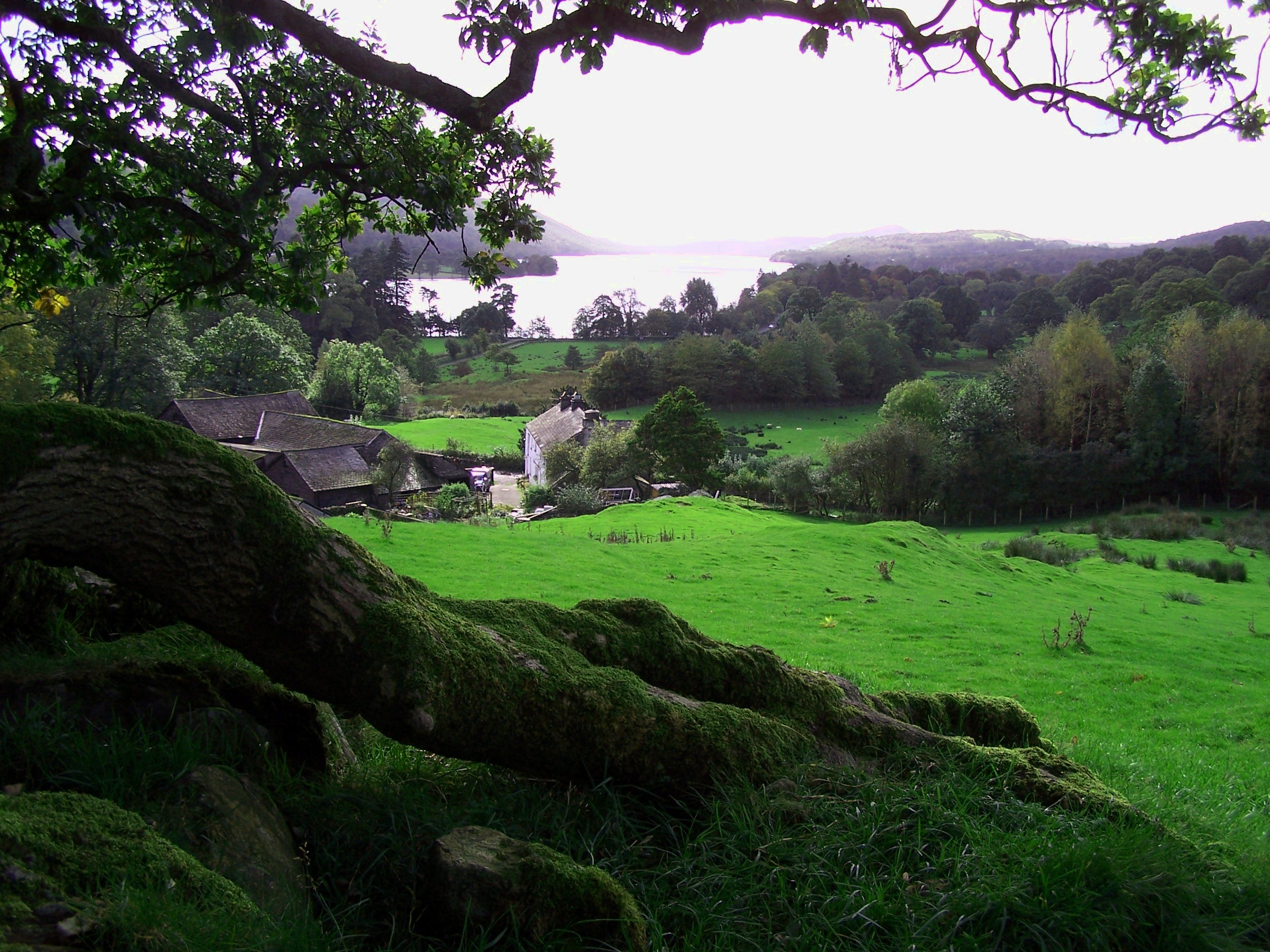
View over Coniston Water

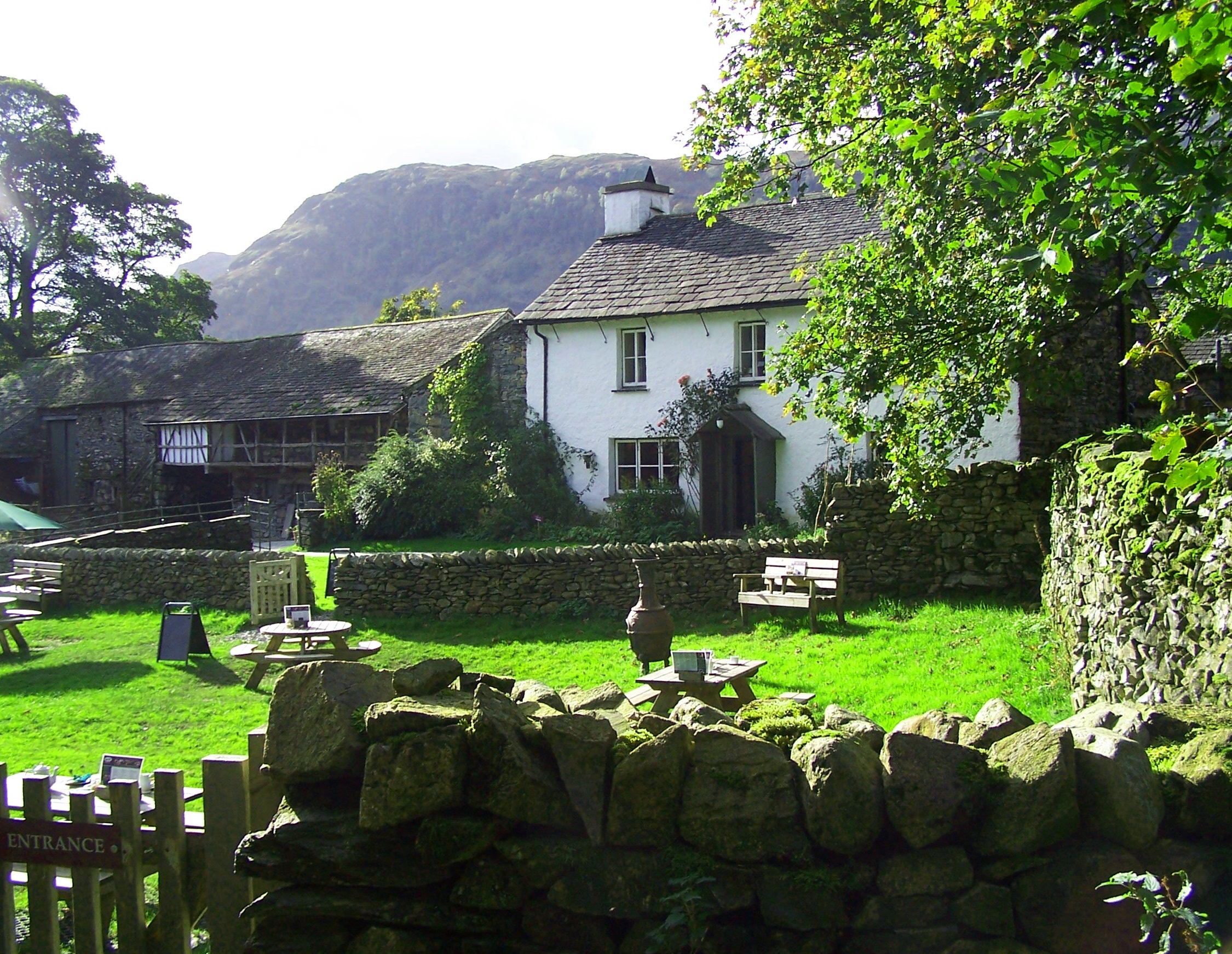
Yew Tree Farm

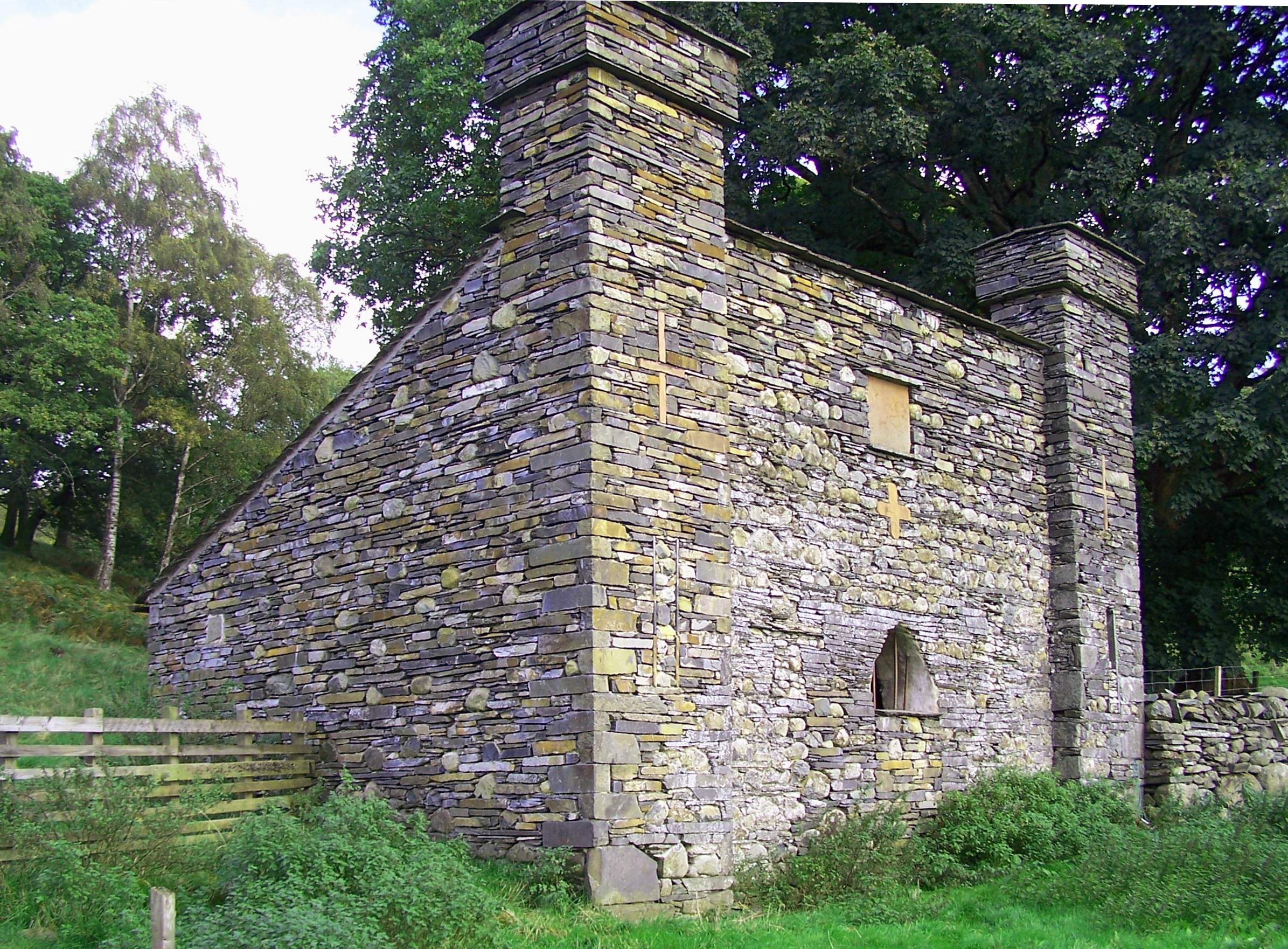
Old Dog House

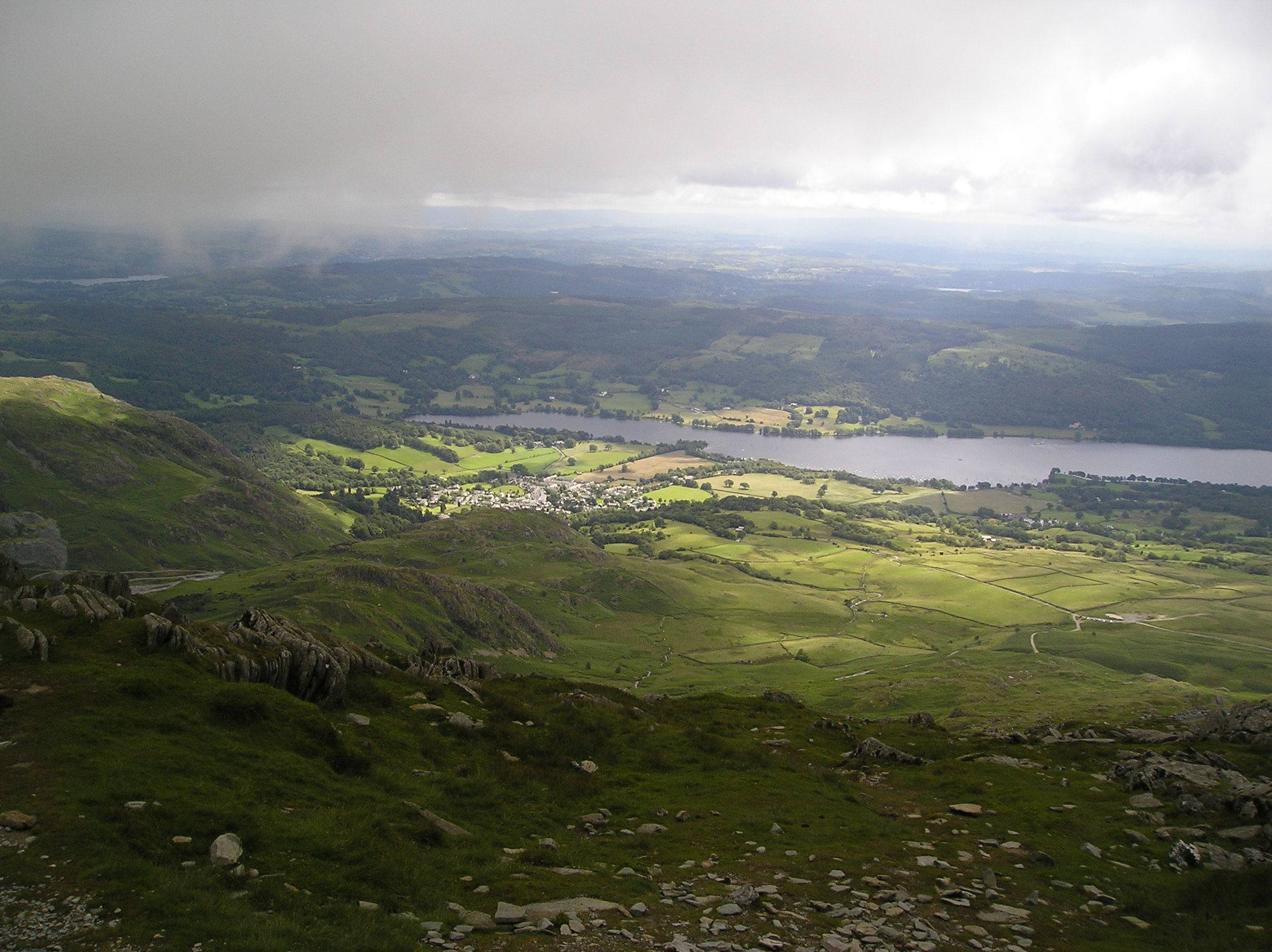
Village from Old Man

== See also ==
- Listed buildings in Coniston, Cumbria
- Coniston Hall
- Coniston Mountain Rescue Team
- John Ruskin School
- Henry Robinson Hall
