= List of places of worship in Barrow-in-Furness =

This article lists places of worship in the English town of Barrow-in-Furness. Barrow was a town built on industry and up until the late 19th century was only a small village. The population skyrocketed in a matter of decades to a peak of over 70,000, as a result the majority of the town's places of worship were built in the late 19th century and early 20th century. Many were only temporary timber structures and soon replaced by the present buildings. According to the 2001 UK Census, 81.03% of Barrow's population identified as Christian with 0.58% of individuals stating another religion (the majority being Muslims and Buddhists). However these figures are currently outdated, as even in 2001 7.59% of individuals didn't state a religion (as opposed to stating 'no religion') as well as the fact that between 2001 and 2007, the ethnic minority population of Barrow has almost trebled in size. All current places of worship in Barrow belong to denominations of Christianity, although three Jewish Synagogues were sited in the town in the early 20th century. Despite this, the Kadampa Buddhist Temple and Manjushri Mahayana Centre which are located on the outskirts of the borough are amongst the oldest Buddhist centres in the western world. The nearest Mosque to the town is sited in Lancaster, the nearest Synagogue in Blackpool and Gurudwara in Preston.

This list also includes churches in the wider former Borough of Barrow-in-Furness area.

== Existing places of worship ==
Below is a list of current buildings that were purpose built as places of worship in Barrow-in-Furness.

=== Christian churches ===
The borough has an estimated 33 active churches for 67,300 inhabitants, a ratio of one church for every 2,039 people.

Name	Image	Ward	Dedication	Reference	Year	Denomination Christian	Grade	Benefice	Notes
Grace Church Barrow		Roosecote			2017	CoE Plant		South Barrow Team	Planted in the Holbeck & Roose area in 2017.
St Peter, Ireleth with Askam		Askam and Ireleth	Peter		1865	CoE		Askam and Dalton	Chapel (to Dalton parish church) existed since 1608
Askam Methodist Church		Askam and Ireleth				Methodist		SW Cumbria United Area	
St Mary, Dalton-in-Furness		Dalton Town with Newton	Mary		Medieval	CoE		Askam and Dalton	Present church built 1883-1885
Our Lady of the Rosary & St Margaret of Scotland, Dalton		Dalton Town with Newton	Mary & Margaret			Roman Catholic		Ulverston & Dalston	
Dalton Community Church		Dalton Town with Newton				Methodist / URC		SW Cumbria United Area	
St Peter, Lindal and Marton		Lindal and Marton	Peter		1875	CoE		Pennington, Lindal, Bardsea	Current building 1886. Benefice includes two churches in South Lakeland
St Francis, Barrow		Ormsgill	Francis of Assisi		1955	CoE		North Barrow Team	
St Pius' Roman Catholic Church		Ormsgill	Pope Pius X		1955	Roman Catholic			
St Paul, Newbarns & Hawcoat		Hawcoat	Paul		1871	CoE			Current church and front facade extended in the 20th century.
The Church of Jesus Christ of Latter-day Saints		Hawcoat			1998	Latter Day Saint			
St James, Barrow		Hindpool	James		1869	CoE	II*	North Barrow Team	Barrow's 2nd oldest Anglican church. Holds 1,000 worshippers. 150 ft spire
St Mark, Barrow		Hindpool	Mark		1989	CoE			Original church completed in 1877. Restored after WWII bombing.
St Mary of Furness, Barrow		Hindpool	Mary		1858	Roman Catholic	II	Our Lady of Furness Parish	The spire of the church was added in 1888.
Hartington St Methodist Church		Hindpool			1874	Methodist		SW Cumbria United Area	Originally known as Bethel Primitive Methodist.
The Salvation Army		Hindpool			1910	Salvation Army			
Trinity Church Centre		Parkside	Trinity		1902	Methodist / URC		SW Cumbria United Area	AKA Abbey Road Wesleyan Methodist. Original church completed 1876.
Abbey Road Baptist Church		Parkside			1958	Baptist Union			
Spring Mount Christian Fellowship		Parkside				Independent			
St Aidan, Barrow		Newbarns	Aidan of Lindisfarne		1967	CoE		South Barrow Team	Original hall (now vicarage) completed in 1952, extended 1967.
Holy Family Roman Catholic Church		Newbarns	Holy Family		1951	Roman Catholic		Our Lady of Furness Parish	
Beacon Hill Methodist Church		Newbarns			1956	Methodist		SW Cumbria United Area	
St George, Barrow		Central	George		1860	CoE	II	South Barrow Team	Barrow's oldest existing Anglican church.
Sacred Heart Roman Catholic Church		Central	Sacred Heart		1929	Roman Catholic		Our Lady of Furness Parish	Original chapel opened 1902
Ramsden Street United Reformed Church		Central			1864	URC		SW Cumbria United Area	
Emmanuel Community Church		Central	Jesus		1995	Independent			
Risedale Gospel Hall		Risedale				Gospel Hall			
St John, Barrow		Barrow Island	John the Evangelist		1935	CoE	II		Original church completed in 1876
St Patrick's Roman Catholic Church		Barrow Island	Patrick		1933	Roman Catholic		Our Lady of Furness Parish	Original church completed 1885
Vickerstown Methodist Church		Walney North				Methodist		SW Cumbria United Area	
St Columba's Roman Catholic Church		Walney South	Columba		1958	Roman Catholic		Our Lady of Furness Parish	
St Mary the Virgin, Walney		Walney South	Mary		1930	CoE	II		A church has existed on the site since 1577

=== Churches belonging to groups not universally recognised as Christian ===
Name	Image	Ward/parish	Web	Founded	Denomination	Notes
Harley St Spiritualist Church		Hindpool			Spiritualism	
Spiritualists Psychological Hall					Spiritualism	

== Former places of worship ==
Below is a list of current or former buildings that were purpose built as places of worship in Barrow-in-Furness, but no longer serve this purpose.

Name	Image	Ward	Denomination	Built	Grade	Notes
Abbey Road/ Ainslie Street Synagogue		Parkside	Judaism	1900		Barrow's first synagogue was built in 1902 and closed in 1913.
Christ Church		Hindpool	Methodism	1875		Opened in 1875, the Christ Church Methodist New Connexion was almost completely destroyed by World War II bombing, small parts of the lower church still stand today and house a gym.
Crellin Street Synagogue		Hindpool	Judaism	1920		Barrow's growing Ashkenazi Jewish population relocated to a larger synagogue between 1918 and 1925.
Emmanuel Church		Parkside	Congregationalist	1900		A small chapel opened on the site in 1876 and was extended in 1900. Rising maintenance costs lead to the building being abandoned, it was demolished in 1993 and an elderly home is now on the site.
Forshaw Street Primitive Methodist		Hindpool	Methodism	1866		Opened in 1866 and closed in 1953, the site of the former church is now home to a furniture store and part of Debenhams, Portland Walk.
Greengate Street Wesleyan Methodist		Central	Methodism	1876		Opened in 1876 and closed around 1996, before construction of new buildings began on the site in 2001.
Hindpool Road Congregational		Central	Congregationalist	1863		The first church to be built on the site opened in 1857, the current building was completed in 1863 although it closed in 1931. The current building houses a garage.
Hindpool Road Wesleyan Methodist		Central	Methodism	1862		Opened in 1862 and closed in 1935, the former church building is now 'Scorpio' nightclub.
King's Hall Wesleyan Methodist		Hindpool	Methodism	1907		From construction in 1907 until 1951, King's Hall served as a church although it has served various purposes since.
Marsh Street Primitive Methodist		Central	Methodism	1875		Opened in 1875 and closed in 1953, the church building is currently derelict.
Roose Methodist Church		Roosecote	Methodism			Closed 2016
Roose Road Bible Christian		Risedale	Methodism	1875		Opened in 1875 and closed in 1976, the church building has served various purposes since.
School Street Synagogue		Hindpool	Judaism			62 School Street functioned as Barrow's only synagogue between 1925 and 1974 when the local Jewish population dwindled to around a dozen.
St Luke, Barrow		Risedale	CoE	1964		Original church 1877. Redundant 2008 and demolished 2017.
St Matthew, Barrow		Ormsgill	CoE	1967		Original church completed 1877. Closed 2015
St Michael, Rampside		Roosecote (Rampside)	CoE	1840		Benefice includes three churches in South Lakeland. Chapel of ease on site dates back to 1621. Closed 2016
St Perran, Roose		Roosecote	CoE	1967		Closed 2014
St Mary of Furness monastery		Newbarns	Cistercian	1123	I	Founded in 1123 and disestablished and destroyed in 1537 by Henry VII's Reformation. Better known as Furness Abbey it was once the second richest and most powerful cistercian monastery in the country.
Stonedyke Methodist Chapel		Roose	Methodism	1877		Opened in 1877 and closed in 1991, the church building is derelict.
Storey Square United Methodist Free Church		Central	Methodism	1894		The first church on the site opened in 1874, and the current building was completed in 1894, the church closed in 1952 and was demolished in 2010.
Trinity Church		Hindpool	Presbyterianism	1867	II	Once one of Barrow's largest functioning churches, Trinity church was closed in 1971 and has been derelict since. In 2005, a fire destroyed the abandoned building even more and it was ultimately demolished in 2013.

== See also ==
- Barrow-in-Furness
- Demographics of Cumbria
- Bishop of Barrow-in-Furness
