= Trinity Church, Barrow-in-Furness =

Former church in Barrow-in-Furness, Cumbria, England

Trinity Church
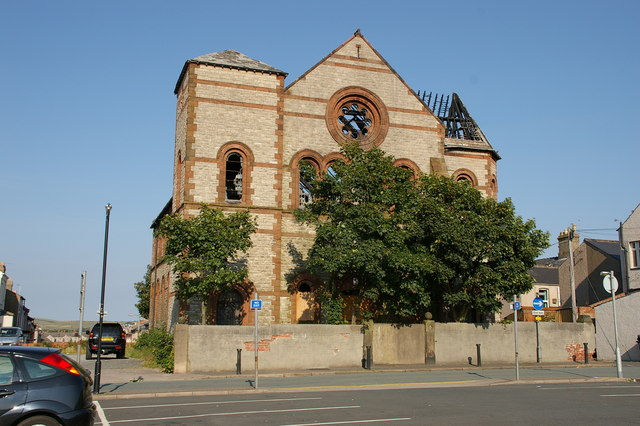
- The church pictured in August 2005 post fire

Religion
- Affiliation: Presbyterianism
- Status: Demolished

Location
- Location: Hindpool, Barrow-in-Furness, Cumbria, England
- Interactive map of Trinity Church
- Coordinates: 54.1125°N 3.2236°W

Architecture
- Architect: Paley and Austin
- Completed: 1875
- Demolished: 2013

Trinity Church was a Presbyterian church located on School Street in Barrow-in-Furness, England. It is not the same building as the joint Methodist and URC church in Parkside, Barrow-in-Furness known as the Trinity Church Centre.

== History ==
The church building was built in 1875 to accommodate the town's large Scottish Presbyterian congregation which had been meeting in the Welsh Chapel for ten years. In 1907 another Presbyterian church, St Andrew's, was built on Walney.

The church closed nearly 100 years after its foundation in 1971 when congregations merged in the context of the creation of the United Reformed Church. Churchgoers moved to a former Congregationalist church. The Trinity building continued to be used for various functions, however in March 2005 was almost destroyed by fire when it was being used as a bike store. The building's owner absolved itself of all responsibility for its upkeep in 2009 and Barrow Borough Council took control in 2013, and with no chance of redevelopment demolished it later the same year.

== Architecture ==
The Italian/Romanesque church was designed by Paley and Austin architects and cost £5,000 to build on a site that was donated to the Presbyterian congregation by Sir James Ramsden. Trinity Church was one of just seven places of worship in Barrow with listed building status prior to demolition.

== See also ==
- List of places of worship in Barrow-in-Furness
- List of ecclesiastical works by Paley and Austin
