= St John's Church, Barrow-in-Furness =

Church in Barrow-in-Furness, Cumbria, England

St. John's Church
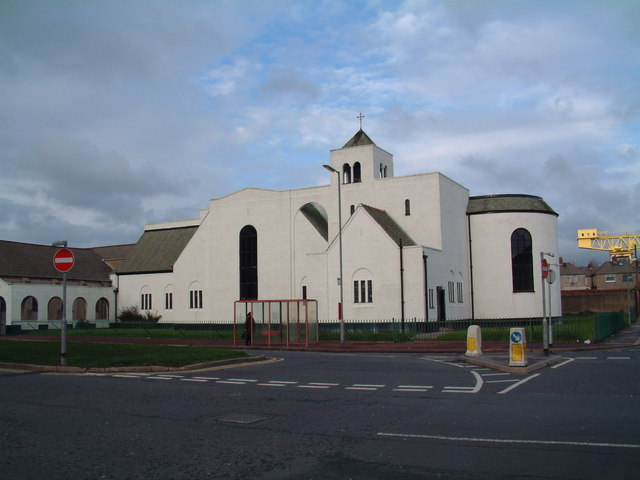

Religion
- Affiliation: Church of England
- District: Diocese of Carlisle
- Province: Province of York
- Status: Active

Location
- Location: Barrow Island, Barrow-in-Furness, Cumbria, England
- Interactive map of St. John's Church
- Coordinates: 54.1037°N 3.2282°W

St. John's Church is a church on Barrow Island, Barrow-in-Furness, Cumbria, England. It is a Grade II listed building.

The church was built in 1934-1935 of concrete with green slate roofs in a modern Byzantine style. The architects were Seely & Paget. The interior incorporates elements from the earlier church on the site which dated from 1879.

== See also ==
- Listed buildings in Barrow-in-Furness
- List of places of worship in Barrow-in-Furness
