= Barrow Park =

Public park in Barrow-in-Furness, Cumbria, England

- Interactive map of Barrow Park
- Type: Public park
- Location: Parkside, Barrow-in-Furness, Cumbria, England
- Coordinates: 54°7′3″N 3°13′6″W
- Area: 45 acres (0.18 km^{2})
- Created: 1908
- Operator: Barrow Borough Council
- Status: Open all year round

Barrow Park is a 45-acre public park in Barrow-in-Furness, Cumbria, England. It is located entirely within the Parkside ward, to which the park lends its name, bound by Abbey Road, Park Drive, Greengate Street and Park Avenue. Barrow Park was designed by Thomas Mawson in 1908 and was constructed in stages over the following two decades. Originally sited on the outskirts of Barrow, the park is now more or less central due to rapid growth of the town northwards during the early 20th century. It is designated by Historic England as Grade II on the Register of Historic Parks and Gardens.

The park contains a large boating lake, mini railway, skate park, various playgrounds and The Park Leisure Centre. The Barrow Parkrun takes place within the park every Saturday. Large sections of Barrow Park were redeveloped in 2005 to include a new pavilion, café, bandstand and display glasshouse. The park has since gained Green Flag status. The miniature railway features a signal box taken, in 1974, from a line closed as part of the Beeching cuts. It underwent a round of restoration in late 2016.

== Features ==
=== The Park Leisure Centre ===
The multi-functional leisure facility is in the eastern perimeter off Barrow Park and is home to two large swimming pools, a gym, exercise studios and a sports hall. The Park Leisure Centre as with the park itself is owned and operated by Barrow Borough Council and offers numerous classes while also accommodating for groups and the general public. The leisure centre also maintains a number of outdoor artificial pitches for various sports.

=== Cenotaph ===
The most iconic feature of Barrow Park is the town's principal cenotaph; commemorating almost 900 Barrovians who lost their lives in various wars. The memorial is located at the highest point of the park on the site of a late Bronze Age fort offering 360-degree views of Barrow.

== Park map ==
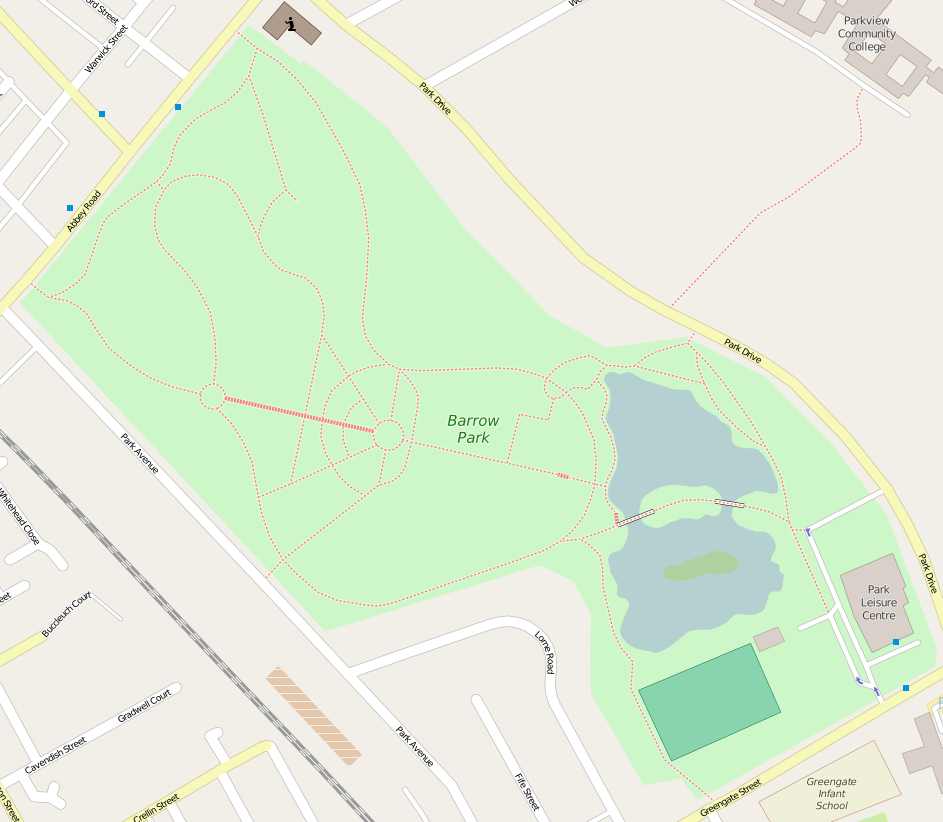

== Gallery ==
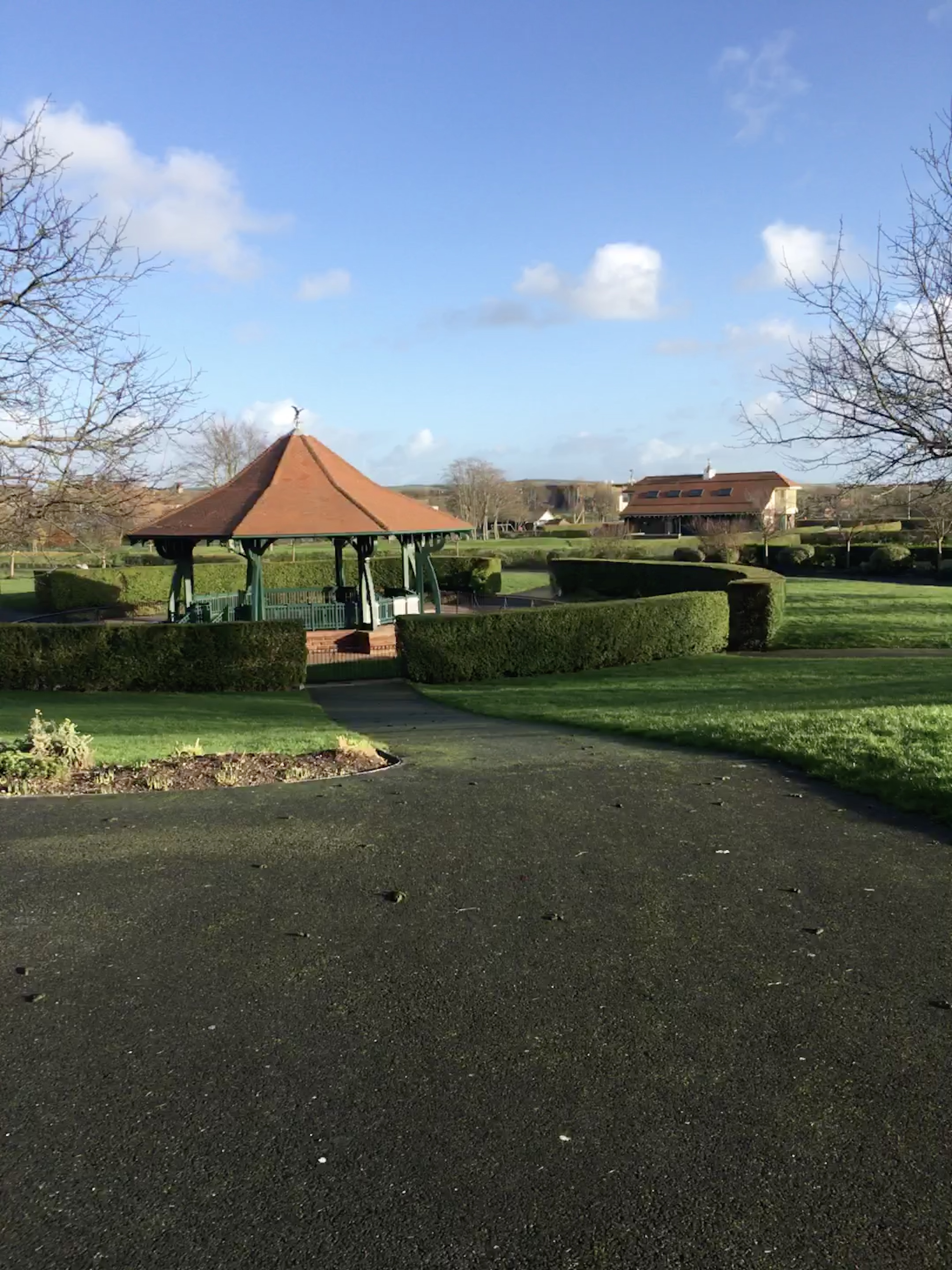
Bandstand and Pavilion

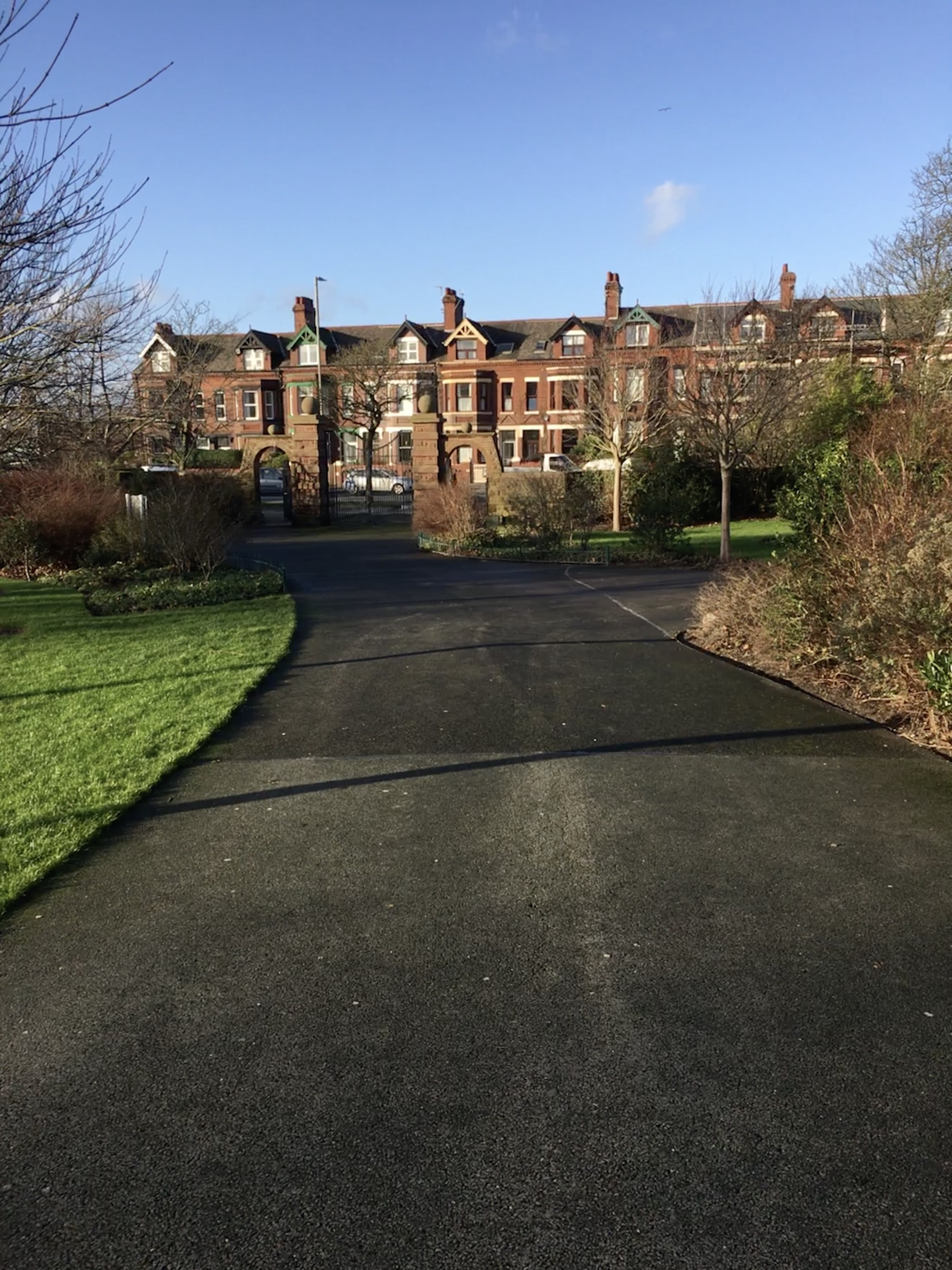
Main entrance gateway from Abbey Road

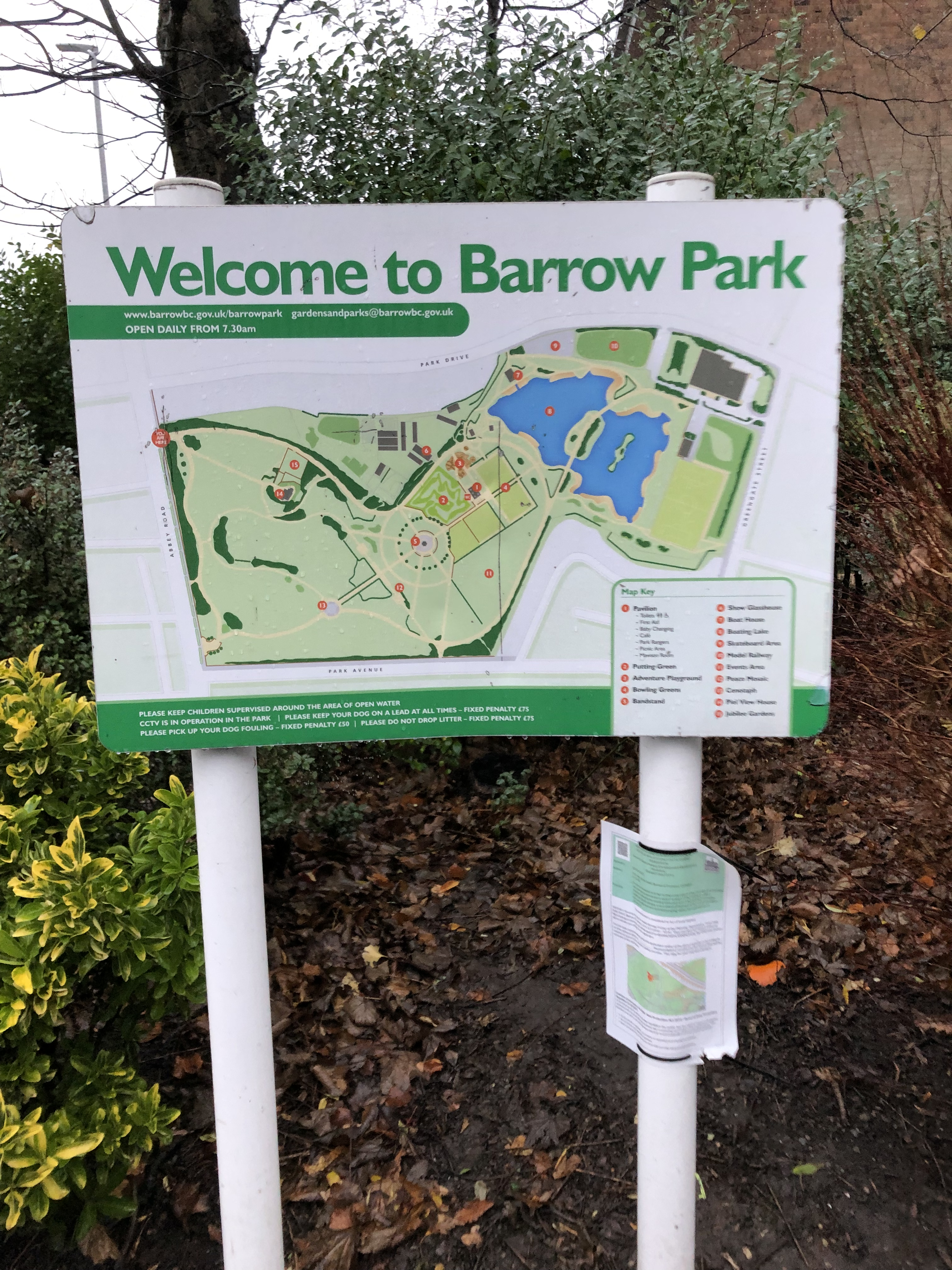
Signage at the Park

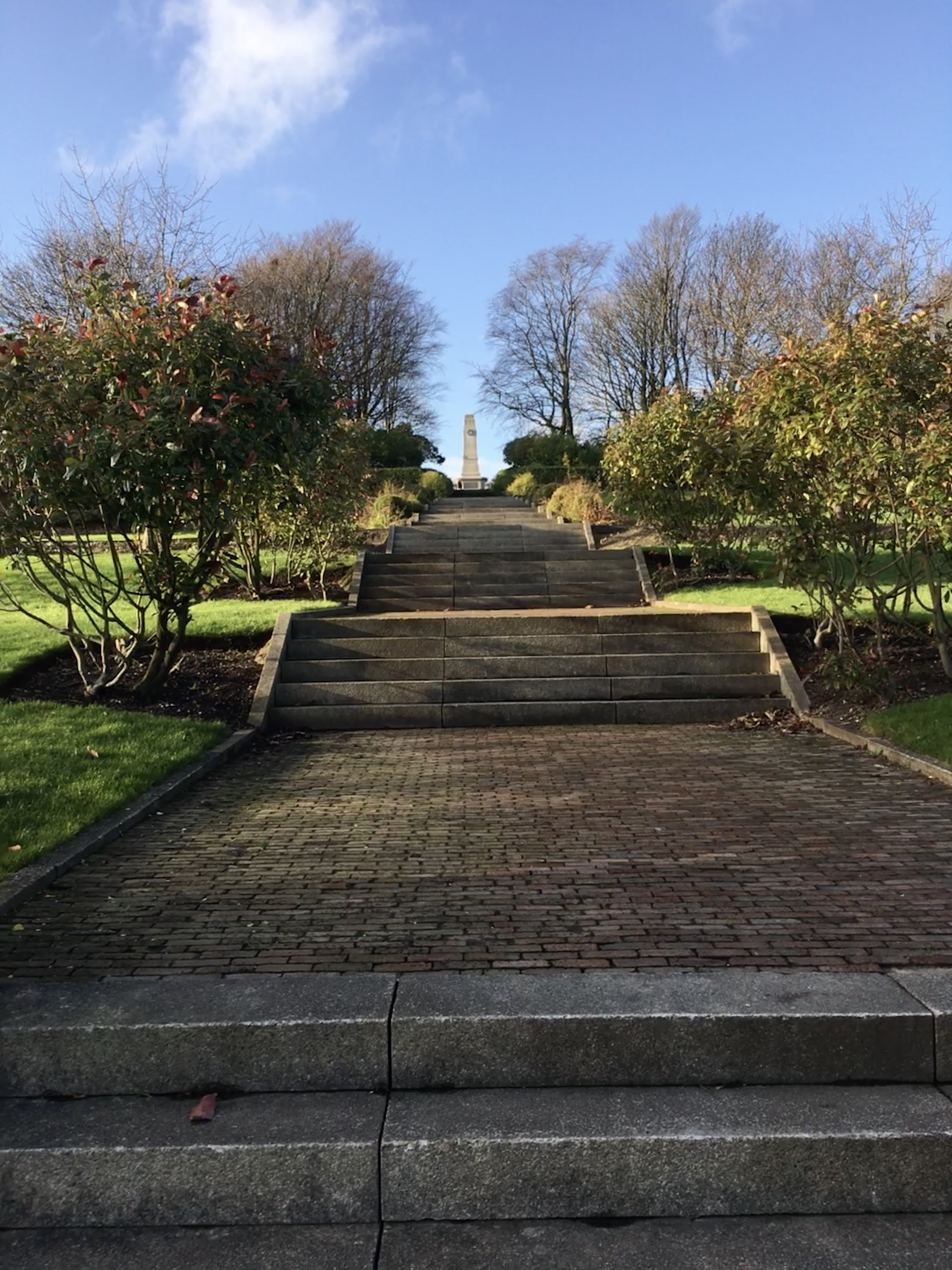
Steps leading to the Cenotaph

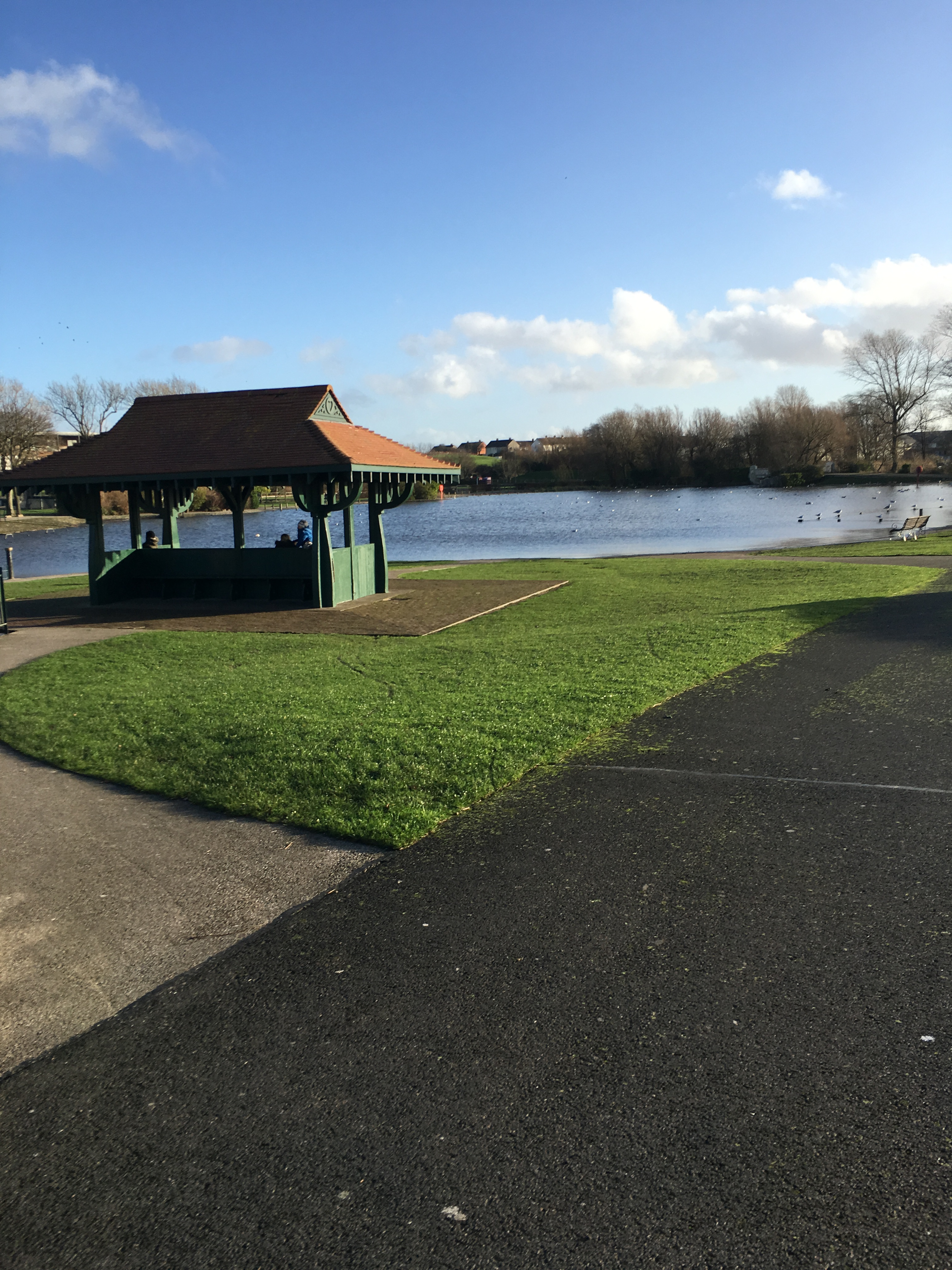
Shelter and Boating Lake
