= Demographics of Cumbria =

The English county of Cumbria is located in North West England and has a population of 496,200 (making it the 41st most populous county of England's 48 counties). Cumbria has an area of 6,768 km², making the county England's third largest county, and with only 73 inhabitants per km², it is the country's second least densely populated county. People from Cumbria are known as Cumbrians and they speak a variety of the Cumbrian dialect to the north, whilst a Lancashire accent is more prominent in the south (namely Furness, which was once part of Lancashire). Along with Lancashire to the south, Cumbria is bordered with Scotland to the north, the Irish Sea to the west, Northumberland to the north-east, County Durham to the east and North Yorkshire to the south-east.

The 10 largest settlements in Cumbria, district centres in yellow and the city in bold.
The second 10 largest settlements in Cumbria.

== Settlements ==
Carlisle is the largest and only city in the county, whilst Barrow-in-Furness (the largest town) is twice as large as the second largest town (Kendal).

The twenty most populous settlements in Cumbria are listed below.

Rank	Town	Population	District
1	Carlisle	77,728	Cumberland
2	Barrow-in-Furness	55,251	Westmorland and Furness
3	Kendal	28,944	Westmorland and Furness
4	Whitehaven	22,942	Cumberland
5	Workington	25,207	Cumberland
6	Penrith	16,701	Westmorland and Furness
7	Maryport	12,087	Cumberland
8	Ulverston	11,221	Westmorland and Furness
9	Cockermouth	8,857	Cumberland
10	Dalton-in-Furness with Newton	7,554	Westmorland and Furness
11	Cleator Moor	6,664	Cumberland
12	Wigton	5,831	Cumberland
13	Egremont	5,788	Cumberland
14	Millom	5,694	Cumberland
15	Seaton	5,053	Cumberland
16	Windermere	4,826	Westmorland and Furness
17	Keswick	4,466	Cumberland
18	Brampton	4,186	Cumberland
19	Grange-over-Sands	4,047	Westmorland and Furness
20	Appleby-in-Westmorland	3,228	Westmorland and Furness

== Population and area ==
Cumbria as a whole is the second least densely populated county in England with only 73 people per square kilometre. Despite it being the third largest in area (6,768 km²), about a third of the county is taken up by the Lake District National Park. Below is a table listing each district by population density.

District	Population	Area
Cumberland	273,000	3,330.95 km²
Westmorland and Furness	227,680	3,492.11 km²

== Ethnic groups ==
Below is a table noting the percentage change for each respective ethnic group between 2004 and 2005 compared with England as a whole. This table does not reflect how many people of each group reside in each district; large percentage increases in such places as Copeland and Eden often mean that a community could have just increased from 30 to 37.

Table showing the change in percentage of Cumbria's ethnic groups between 2004 and 2005

Ethnic Group	% Change for Cumbria	% Change for England	District with smallest increase	District with largest increase
White British	-0.1%	0.0%	Allerdale -0.4%	Eden 0.1%
White Irish	1.7%	-1.7%	Barrow-in-Furness -0.4%	Eden 6.5%
Other White	12.3%	7.2%	Copeland 9.1%	Barrow-in-Furness 15.9%
White and Black Caribbean	11.5%	3.2%	Barrow-in-Furness 9.1%	Eden 16.0%
White and Black African	11.1%	6.4%	South Lakeland 6.7%	Eden 20.4%
White and Asian	11.0%	6.0%	Allerdale 9.1%	Copeland 14.9%
Other Mixed	9.3%	5.6%	South Lakeland 7.7%	Copeland 14.0%
Indian	22.3%	5.1%	Allerdale 18.7%	Copeland 27.0%
Pakistani	21.2%	3.8%	Allerdale 16.4%	Copeland 23.6%
Bangladeshi	11.9%	3.6%	Copeland 6.0%	Eden 23.7%
Other Asian	17.1%	6.4%	Barrow-in-Furness 8.4%	Copeland 28.4%
Black Caribbean	18.9%	0.7%	South Lakeland 15.1%	Allerdale 27.1%
Black African	27.4%	6.1%	Barrow-in-Furness 21.8%	Copeland 32.0%
Other Black	15.4%	3.2%	Barrow-in-Furness 10.5%	Allerdale 24.5%
Chinese	14.8%	10.2%	Allerdale 8.2%	South Lakeland 17.8%
Other Ethnic Group	17.8%	8.2%	Copeland 14.7%	Eden 21.9%

Table showing the percentage in ethnic groups by district

	White British	White Other	Mixed/Multiple Ethnic Group	Asian/Asian British	Black/Black British	Other
Allerdale	94.6	2.3	1.9	1.5	0.1	0.6
Barrow-in-Furness	97.1	1.3	0.5	0.9	0.1	0.1
Carlisle	95.0	3.1	0.5	1.2	0.1	0.1
Copeland	97.3	1.2	0.5	0.9	0.1	0.1
Eden	97.0	1.9	0.4	0.6	0.0	0.1
South Lakeland	95.6	2.8	0.6	0.8	0.2	0.1

=== Black ===
People of Sub-Saharan descent (i.e. Black Britons) are one of the county's smallest ethnic groups, with around 0.4% of Cumbria's population suiting this term (around 2,000 people) - England average is around 2.9%. Cumbria's black community is increasing by around 20% per annum (See above), making them one of the county's fastest growing ethnic groups. The vast majority of Cumbria's Afro-Caribbean community reside in the largest towns, and Black Africans now make up a larger percentage than Black Caribbeans. The percentage of Black people for each of the county's six districts is as follows: South Lakeland 0.6%, Allerdale 0.3%, Barrow-in-Furness 0.3%, Carlisle 0.3%, Copeland 0.3%, Eden 0.3%.

=== Chinese ===
At the time of the 2001 Census, Chinese made up the largest ethnic minority group in Cumbria, however over the following decade a number of South Asian (including Indians, Pakistanis and Bangladeshis), Eastern European and Black groups overtook the community in terms of size. Despite this there is still a 1,100 strong Chinese community in the county (roughly 0.2% of Cumbria's population) - England average is around 0.8%. Unlike the South Asian groups, the Chinese are very widely dispersed across the county. The percentage of Chinese people for each of Cumbria's six districts is as follows: Allerdale 0.2%, Barrow-in-Furness 0.2%, Carlisle 0.2%, Copeland 0.2%, Eden 0.2%, South Lakeland 0.2%.

=== Immigrant White ===
2.2% of Cumbria's population (10,700) comes under the Other White category - England average is around 4.7%, meaning white people with ancestry outside of the UK. A large portion of these are people originating from the Republic of Ireland (around 0.5%), as people originating from Northern Ireland (of which there are more) come under the term White British. Whitehaven has been noted to have historically had a population of Irish migrants. Southern Europeans have a strong presence along Cumbria's Western Coast, with the towns of Whitehaven and Workington having significant Italian and Spanish communities. Carlisle to the north is estimated to be home to over 1,600 Poles, as well as countless other Eastern European immigrants. Barrow-in-Furness is home to hundreds of Germans, white Canadians, Poles. Kendal being in a prime location has recently attracted many Eastern European immigrants, as well as many migrants of any race being attracted to work in the Lake District. The percentage of Other White people for each of the county's six districts is as follows: Carlisle 2.8%, South Lakeland 2.6%, Eden 2.3%, Barrow-in-Furness 1.9%, Allerdale 1.8%, Copeland 1.3%.

=== White British group ===
White British people constitute for the largest ethnic group by far in the county at 95.1% (or 470,900 people) - England average is 82.8%. The largest percentage of White British people are in the rural regions of the county, and to some extent the districts of Carlisle and Eden to the North. Every district of Cumbria has a faster than nationwide average of ethnic minority growth. In some cases the larger towns are seeing a greater increase in immigrants than the UK's largest cities. The percentage of White British people for each of the county's six districts is as follows: Copeland 96.3%, Barrow-in-Furness 95.9%, Allerdale 95.7%, Eden 95.3%, Carlisle 94.4%, South Lakeland 93.7%. According to the 2001 UK Census, 16,628 people were born in Scotland, representing 3.4% of the county's population, 3,471 were born in Wales and 2,289 in Northern Ireland.

=== Multiracial ===
People belonging to two or more races Multiracial make up 0.7% of the county's population (some 3,300 people) - England average is around 1.9% Mixed Race. The spread of people of mixed race in Cumbria is more or less equal. The percentage of Mixed Race people for each of the county's six districts is as follows: Allerdale 0.7%, Barrow-in-Furness 0.7%, Carlisle 0.7%, Copeland 0.7%, South Lakeland 0.7%, Eden 0.6%.

=== South Asian ===
The South Asian community in Cumbria has increased dramatically since 2001, and now stand at 1.1% of the population (around 5,600) - England average is around 6.0%, the largest sub groups of this are Indians and Pakistanis, with Bangladeshis and Other South Asians. The percentage of South Asian people for each of Cumbria's six districts is as follows: South Lakeland 1.5%, Allerdale 1.2%, Carlisle 1.1%, Copeland 1.0%, Eden 0.9%, Barrow-in-Furness 0.8%.

== Religion ==
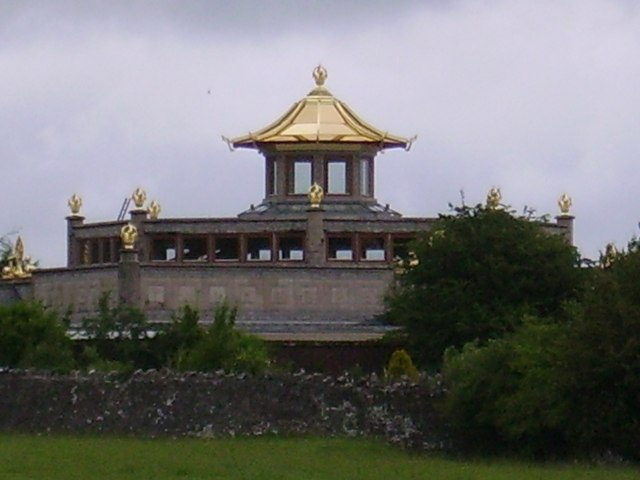
Kadampa Buddhist Temple, Ulverston

The information below is based on 2001 UK Census findings.

Graph showing Cumbrian religions from the 2011 census. All numbers are percentages (%)

	Allerdale	Barrow-in-Furness	Carlisle	Copeland	Eden	South Lakeland
Christian	75.4	70.7	69.1	78.9	70.7	68.1
Buddhist	0.19	0.22	0.26	0.21	0.25	0.45
Hindu	0.04	0.15	0.22	0.11	0.08	0.05
Jewish	0.02	0.02	0.02	0.02	0.06	0.10
Muslim	0.20	0.25	0.42	0.32	0.22	0.17
Sikh	0.01	0.01	0.03	0.01	0.01	0.01
Other	17.3	22.1	22.9	14.4	20.7	23.1
Not stated	6.6	6.4	6.8	5.9	7.7	7.7

=== No Religion ===
The second largest group are those who categorise themselves as having "no religion". This group makes up 10.4% of the population of Cumbria (slightly higher at 11.0% in Carlisle, but lower than the 14.6% national average). The next largest group are those who, for whatever reason, opted not to state their religious affiliation, making up 6.9% of the population of Cumbria (7.8% in Carlisle and 7.7% nationally).

=== Buddhism ===
Cumbria is likely to be the only county in the United Kingdom where Buddhists constitute the second largest religion, where most areas of the country have Islam as the second largest religion. Some 810 Buddhists resided in Cumbria in 2001 (0.2% of the county's population). The largest Buddhist centres and temples can be found in Ulverston and Carlisle, where hundreds of Buddhists live in the Kadampa Buddhist Temple and Uma Buddhist Centre respectively.

=== Christianity ===
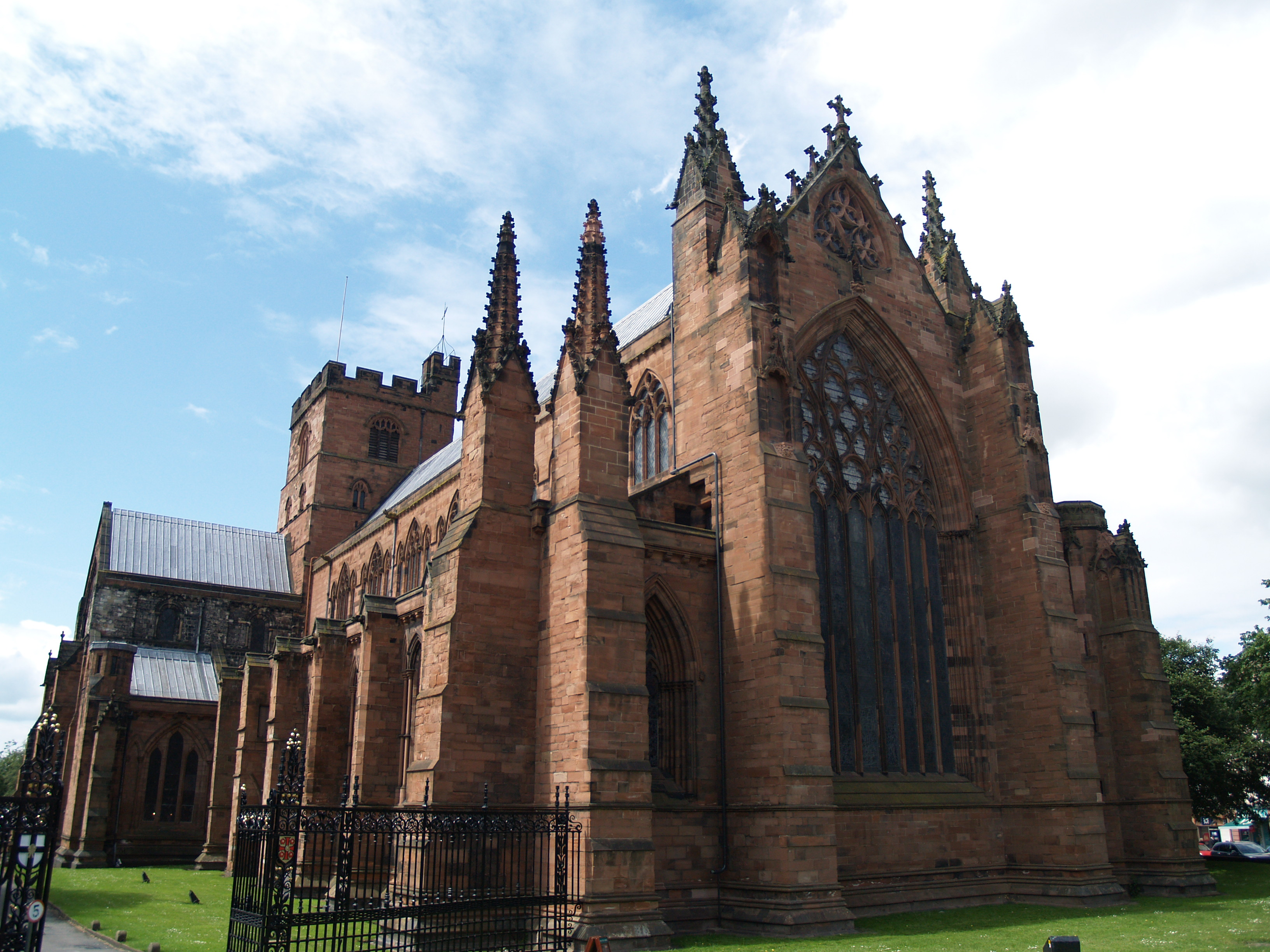
Carlisle Cathedral, Carlisle

Christianity is by far the largest religion in Cumbria, with 400,578 Cumbrians identifying themselves as Christians in the 2001 UK Census. This represents 80.7% of the county's population. However, like with the majority of the rest of the UK, Cumbria's Christian population has thought to have decreased dramatically since 2001, with recent surveys showing that only 53% of the country's population described themselves as Christian. For the Church of England (Anglican), most of Cumbria is in the Anglican Diocese of Carlisle. For Roman Catholics, Cumbria forms part of the Roman Catholic Diocese of Lancaster. There are over 130 churches located across Cumbria with the only cathedral being Carlisle Cathedral.

=== Islam ===
Islam, unlike in most areas of the UK, is not the second most common religion in Cumbria. In 2001, 747 people followed the religion (almost 0.2% of Cumbria's population), with the largest concentration of Muslims being found in Carlisle, Barrow and Kendal. The designated mosque in Cumbria is the Great Border City Masjid in Carlisle (www.carlislemasjid.org), which is predominantly run and used by the city's first and second generations of British Bangladeshi community, also used by British Pakistanis, Turkish, Arabs and others. There are, however, rented-out buildings and prayer rooms in Keswick. Penrith and Whitehaven also have mosques.

== List of districts ==
=== By population ===
- Carlisle - 108,274
- South Lakeland - 104,321
- Allerdale - 97,213
- Barrow-in-Furness - 67,099
- Copeland - 68,689
- Eden - 52,779

=== By area ===
- Eden - 2,142.36 km²
- Allerdale - 1,241.58 km²
- South Lakeland - 1,533.62 km²
- Carlisle - 1,039.30 km²
- Copeland - 731.74 km²
- Barrow-in-Furness - 77.96 km²

=== By population density ===
- Barrow-in-Furness - 861 / km²
- Carlisle - 104 / km²
- Copeland - 94 / km²
- Allerdale - 78 / km²
- South Lakeland - 68 / km²
- Eden - 25 / km²

== See also ==
- Demographics of the United Kingdom
- Demographics of Barrow-in-Furness
