= Newbarns =

Settlement in Cumbria, England

Coordinates: 54.125°N 3.200°W

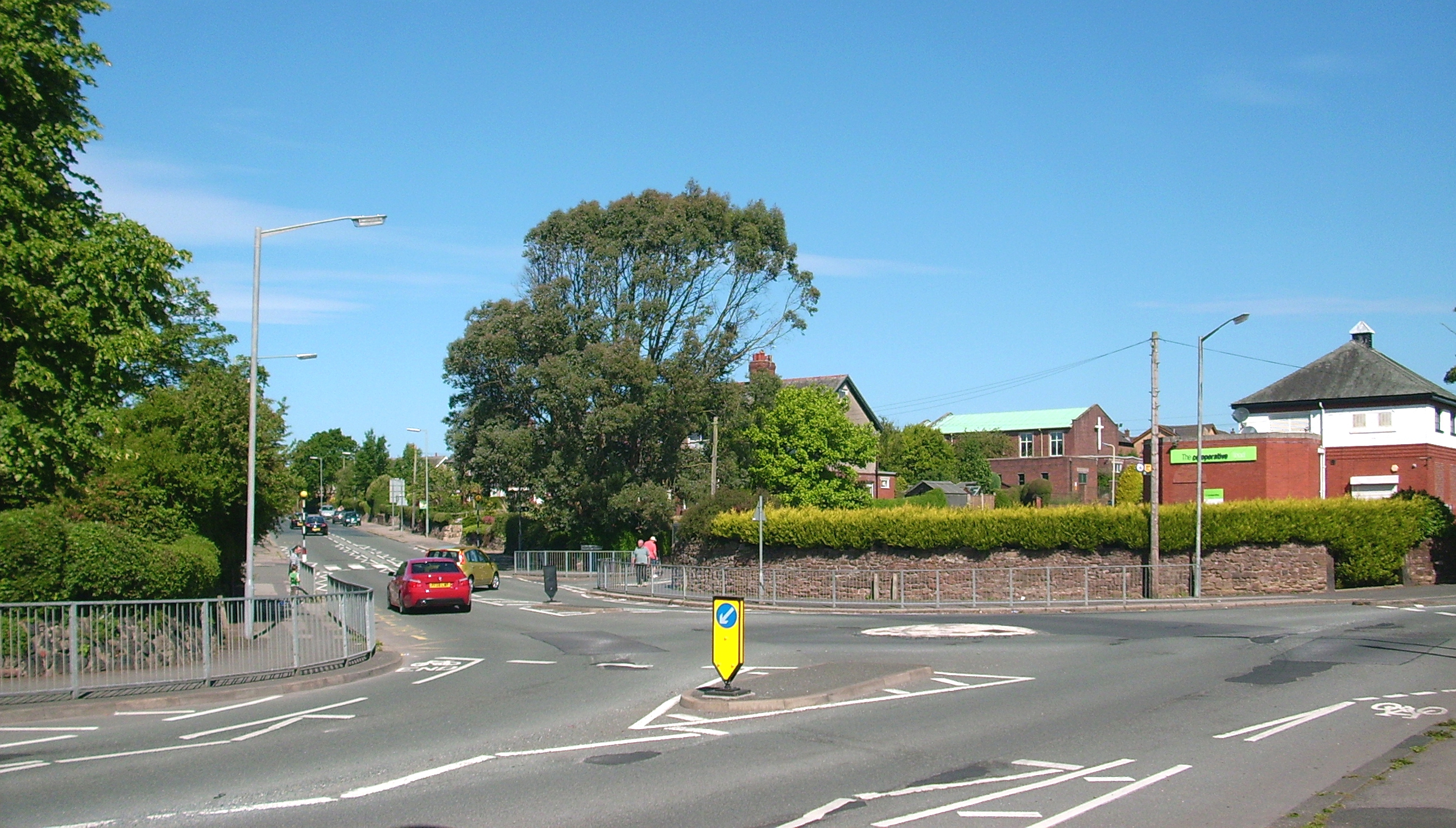
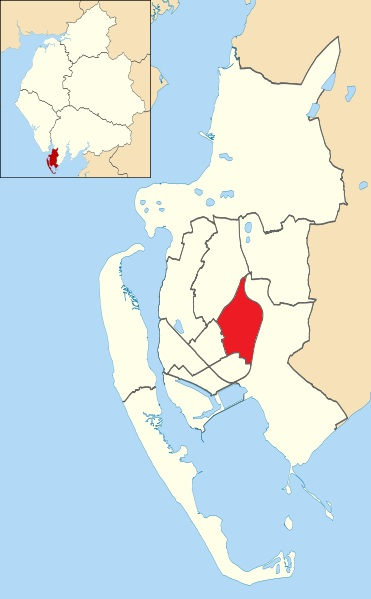
- Roundabout at Harrel, Flass and Rating Lane Newbarns shown within Barrow-in-Furness
- Population: 5,487 (2011.Ward)
- Unitary authority: Westmorland and Furness
- Ceremonial county: Cumbria
- Region: North West
- Country: England
- Sovereign state: United Kingdom
- Post town: BARROW-IN-FURNESS
- Postcode district: LA13
- Dialling code: 01229
- Police: Cumbria
- Fire: Cumbria
- Ambulance: North West
- UK Parliament: Barrow and Furness

Newbarns is an area and electoral ward of Barrow-in-Furness, Cumbria, England. It is bordered by Hawcoat, Parkside, Risedale and Roose, the local population stood at 5,515 in 2001, decreasing to 5,487 at the 2011 Census.

Newbarns covers an area of 2.78 square kilometres and lies east of Abbey Road, encompassing Furness Abbey in its entirety, Barrow Sixth Form College and St. Bernard's Catholic High School. Newbarns is extremely diverse, with the majority of the south of the ward being amongst the 6% to 10% most deprived areas of the country, while north Newbarns contains Croslands Park, Barrow's most expensive street and is within the 25% of least deprived areas nationwide.

Whilst still an electoral ward for Barrow Town Council, the ward was combined at a district/ local authority level with Hawcoat ward in April 2023 to become Hawcoat and Newbarns ward following the formation of the new Westmorland and Furness Local Authority.

== History ==
The area centred on Hector Street marks the original Newbarns village which pre dates much of Barrow and originally lay within the Parish of Dalton-in-Furness. Sandylands Farmhouse is Grade II listed and is the oldest surviving building in Newbarns, dating from 1623. Several other nearby 17th, 18th and 19th century houses are also listed buildings.

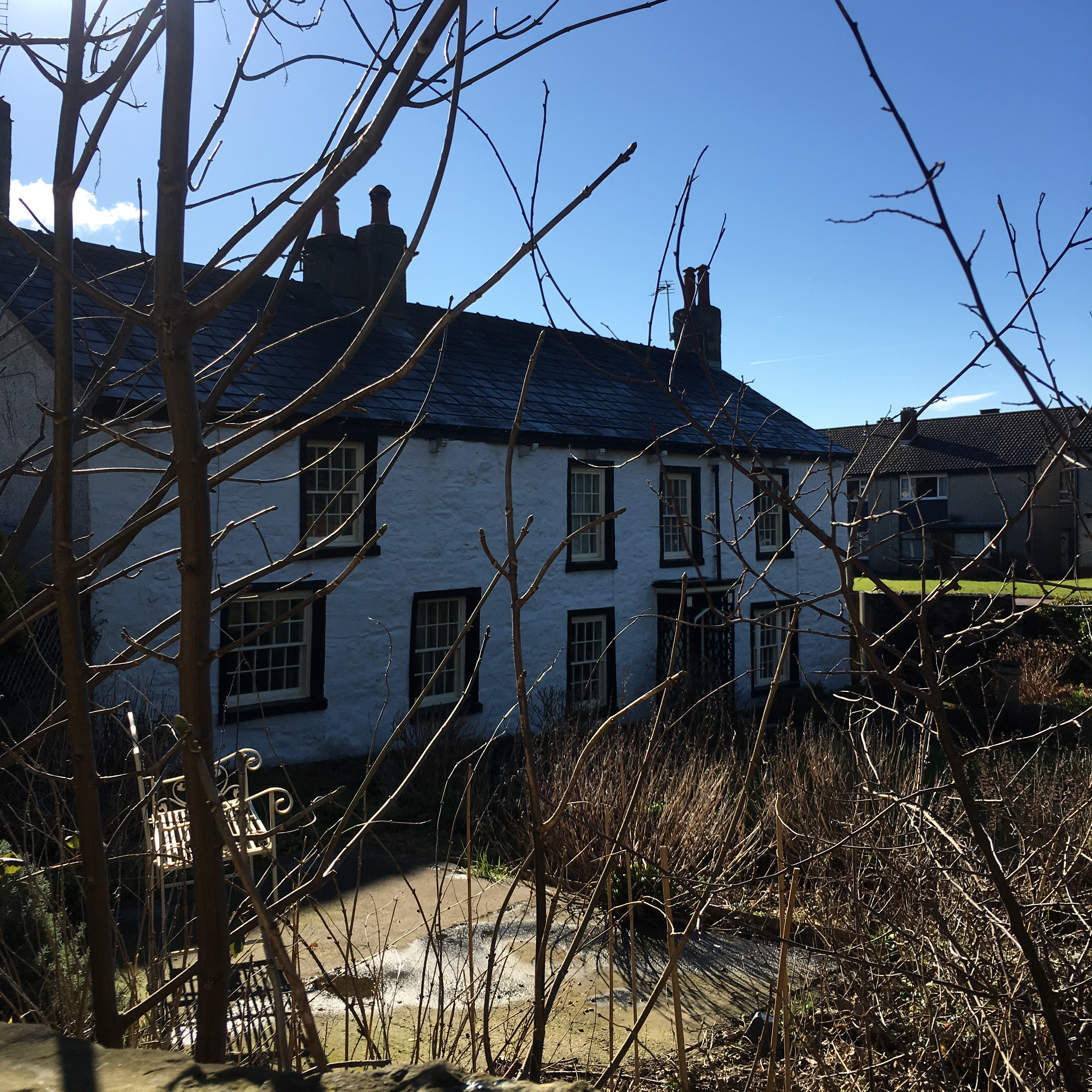
1 Newbarns village

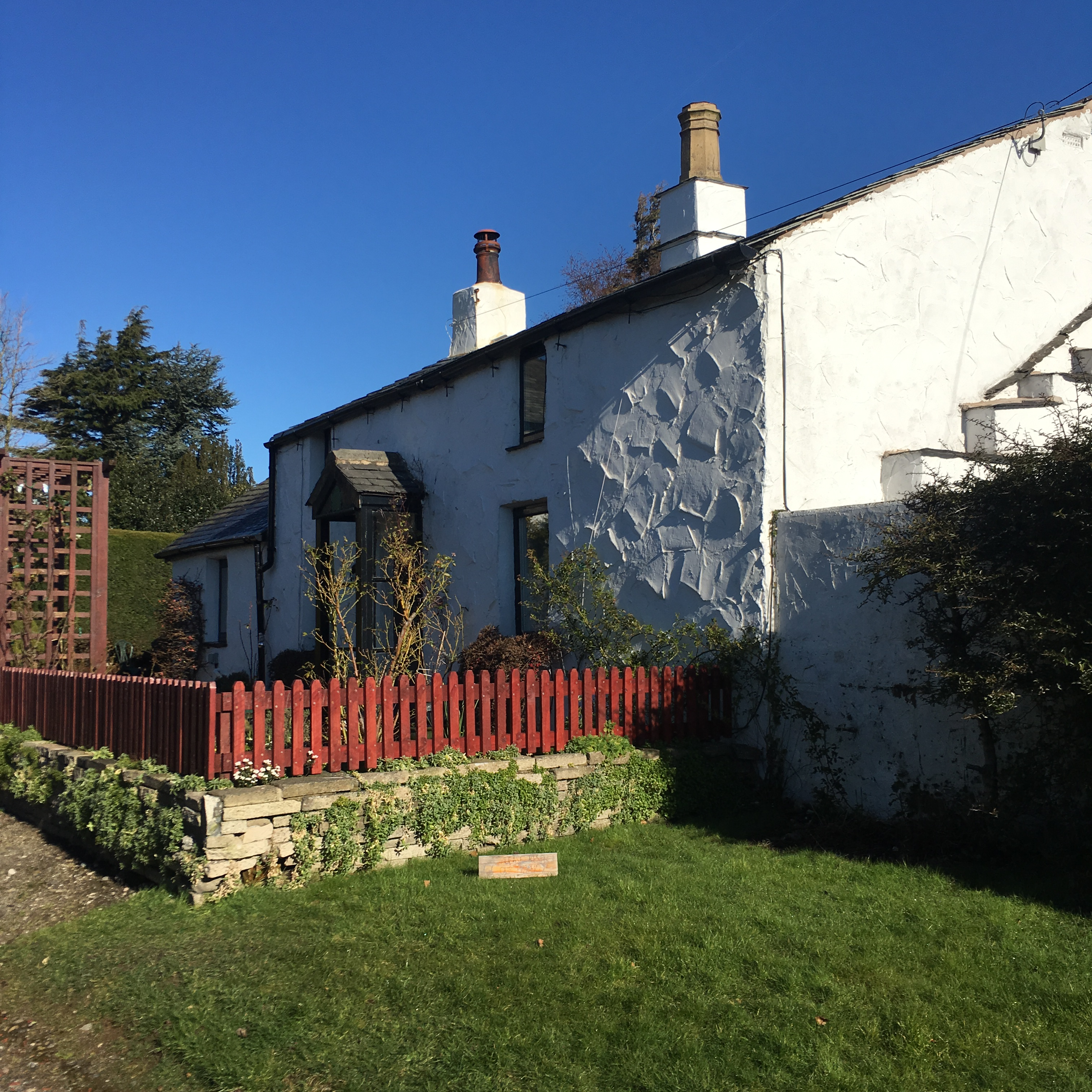
4 Newbarns village

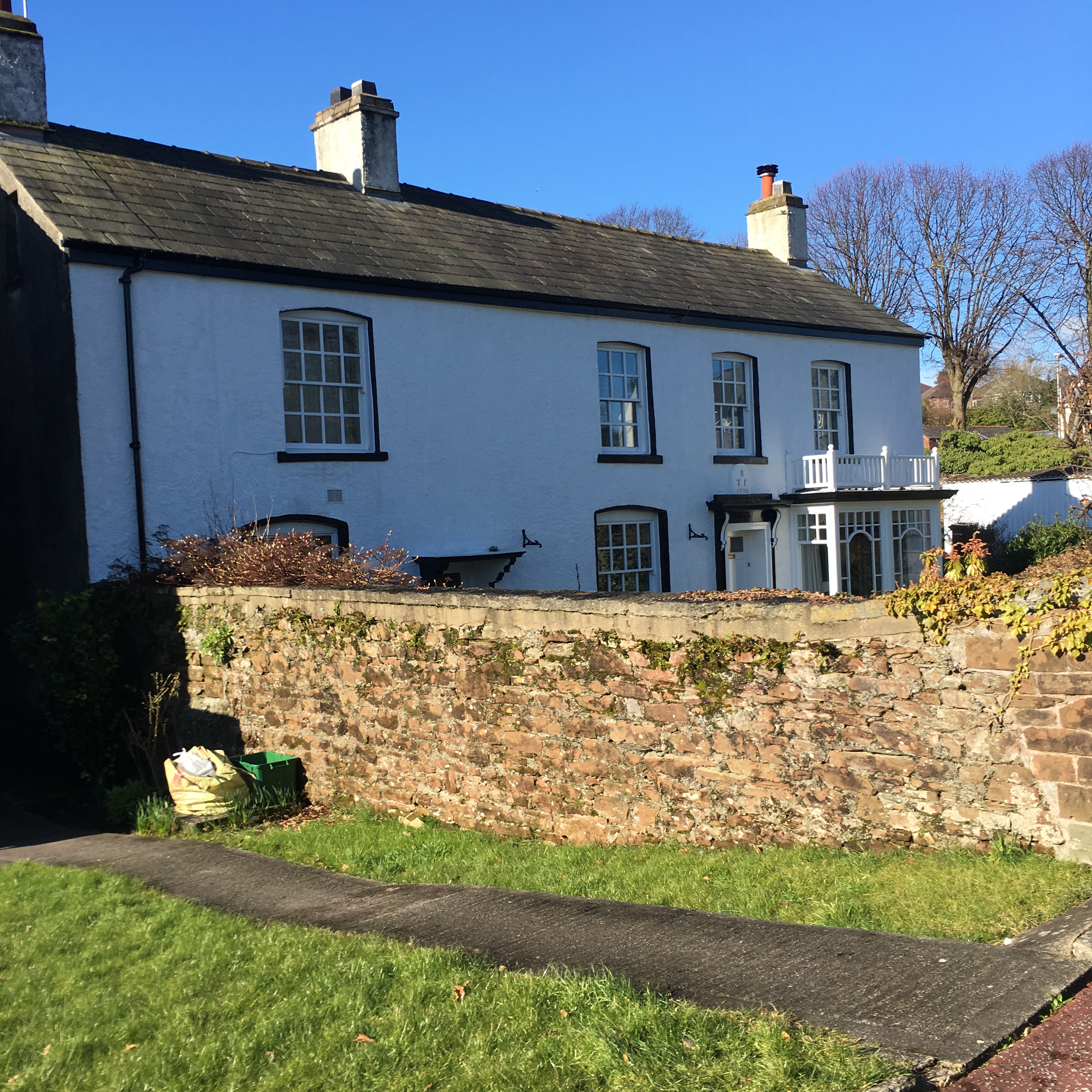
19 Newbarns village

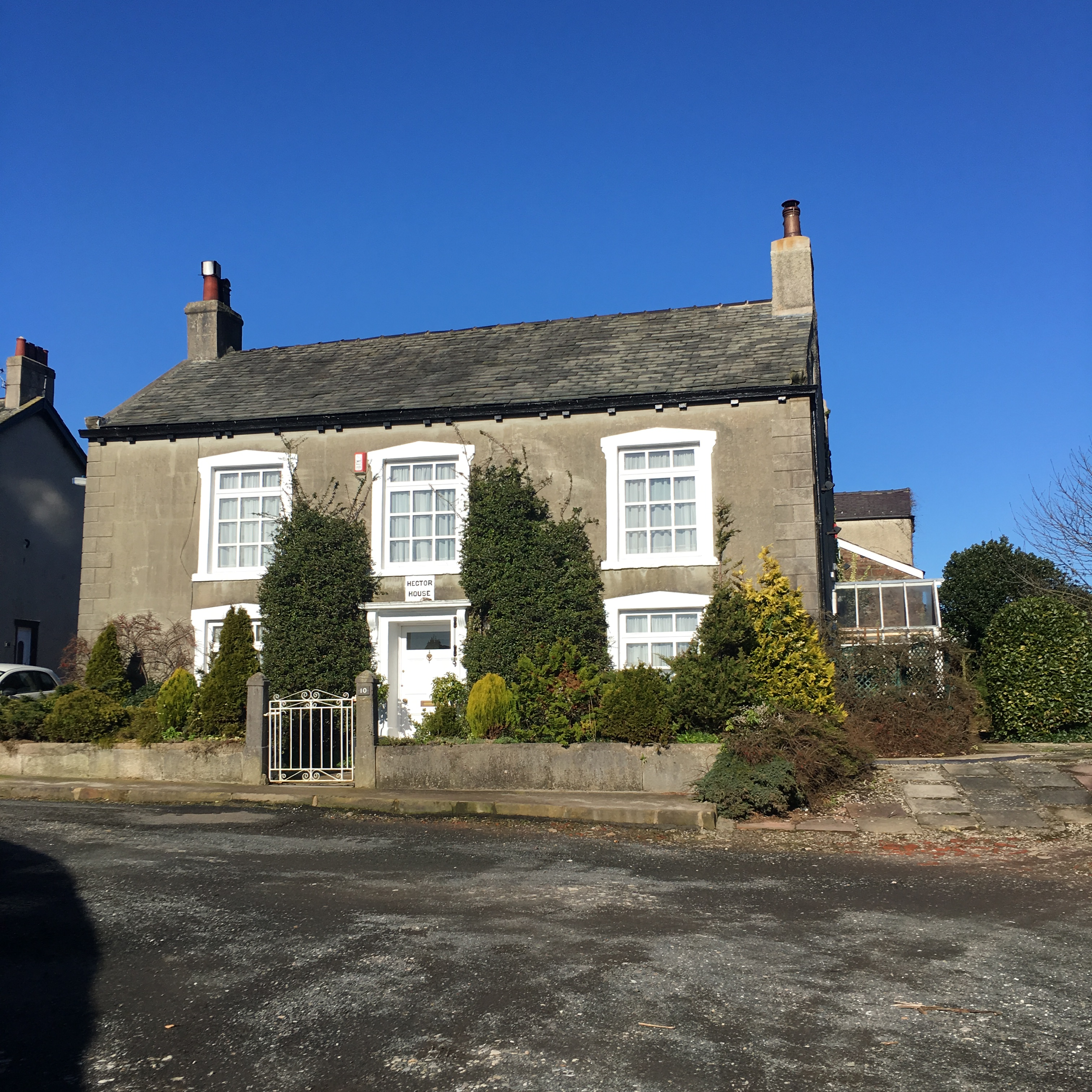
Hector House

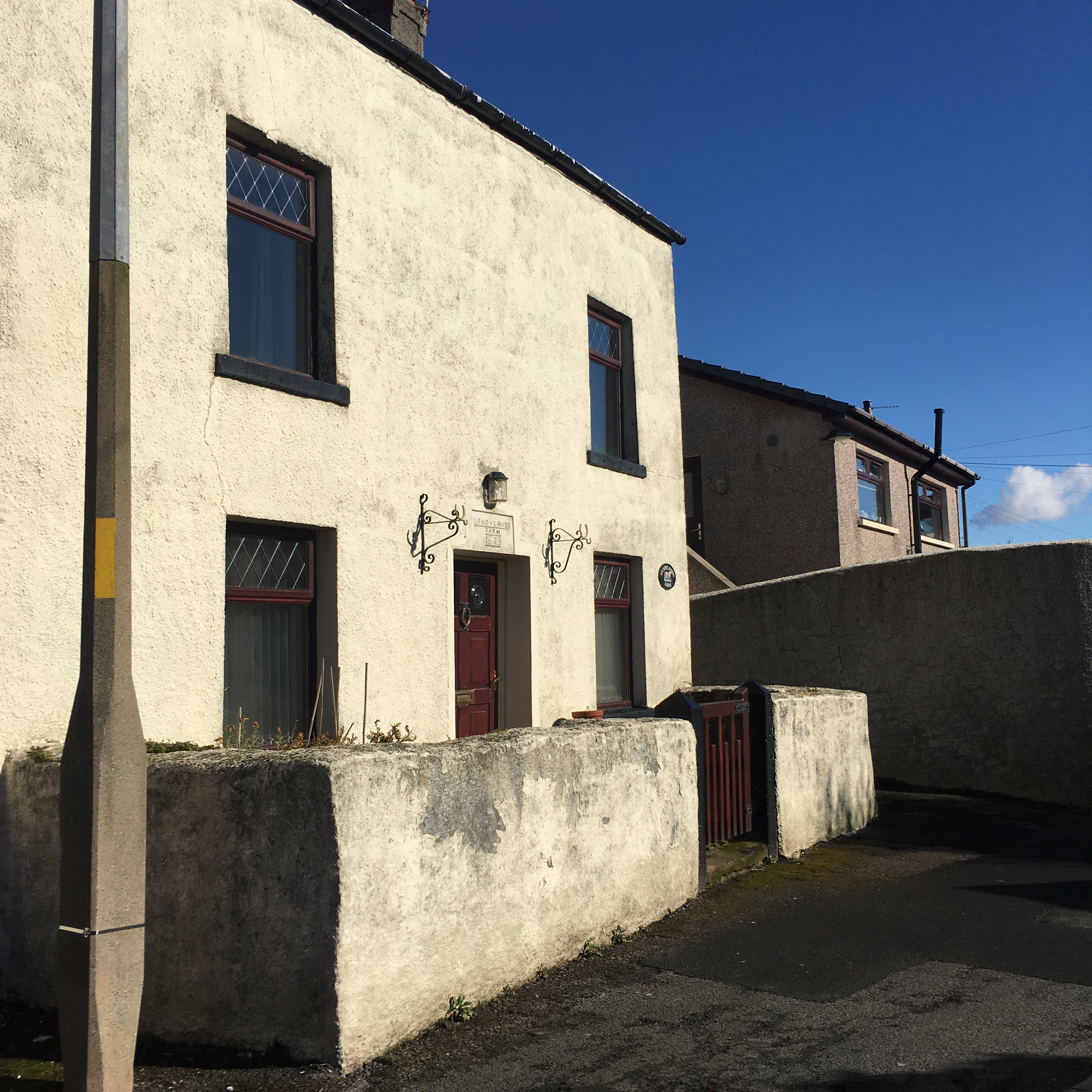
Sandylands Farm

== Demographics ==
Vital statistics	Newbarns	Barrow-in-Furness	England
Religious individuals	83.02%	81.61%	77.71%
Non-religious individuals	9.90%	10.79%	14.59%
Religion withheld	7.09%	7.59%	7.69%
Individuals in fairly good to good health	87.13%	86.75%	90.97%
Individuals in bad health	12.87%	13.25%	9.03%
People aged 16–74 who are economically active	58.03%	60.84%	66.87%
People aged 16–74 who aren't economically active	41.98%	39.16%	33.13%
People aged 16–74 with no qualifications	32.03%	32.82%	28.85%
