= Risedale =

Settlement in Cumbria, England

Coordinates: 54.113°N 3.206°W

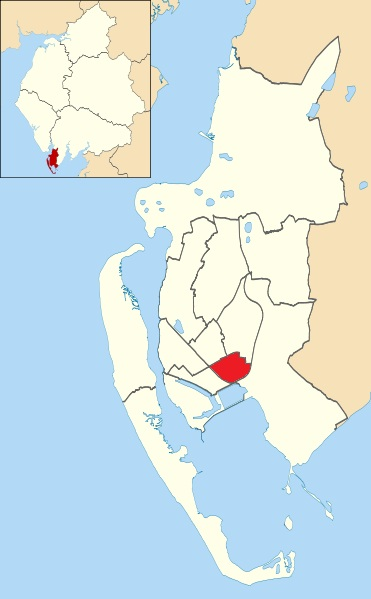
- Risedale shown within Barrow-in-Furness
- Population: 6,294 (2011.Ward)
- Unitary authority: Westmorland and Furness
- Ceremonial county: Cumbria
- Region: North West
- Country: England
- Sovereign state: United Kingdom
- Post town: BARROW-IN-FURNESS
- Postcode district: LA
- Dialling code: 01229
- Police: Cumbria
- Fire: Cumbria
- Ambulance: North West
- UK Parliament: Barrow and Furness

Risedale is an area and ward of Barrow-in-Furness, Cumbria, England. It is bordered by Barrow town centre, Parkside, Newbarns and Roose and had a population of 5,663 in 2001, increasing to 6,294 at the 2011 Census.

Whilst still an electoral ward for Barrow Town Council, the ward was combined at a district/ local authority level with Roosecote ward on 1st April 2023 following formation of the new Westmorland and Furness Local Authority.

Risedale is a fairly deprived district, with figures for unemployment being higher than Barrow and national average. Council housing makes up much of the southern area of the ward (in the form of Broadway, Gateway, Longway and Westway).

Vital statistics	Risedale	Barrow-in-Furness	England
Religious individuals	79.81%	81.61%	77.71%
Non-religious individuals	11.50%	10.79%	14.59%
Religion withheld	8.69%	7.59%	7.69%
Individuals in fairly good to good health	85.68%	86.75%	90.97%
Individuals in bad health	14.32%	13.25%	9.03%
People aged 16–74 who are economically active	58.52%	60.84%	66.87%
People aged 16–74 who aren't economically active	41.47%	39.16%	33.13%
People aged 16–74 with no qualifications	39.60%	32.82%	28.85%
