= Parkside, Barrow-in-Furness =

Settlement in Cumbria, England

Coordinates: 54.120°N 3.216°W

Parkside
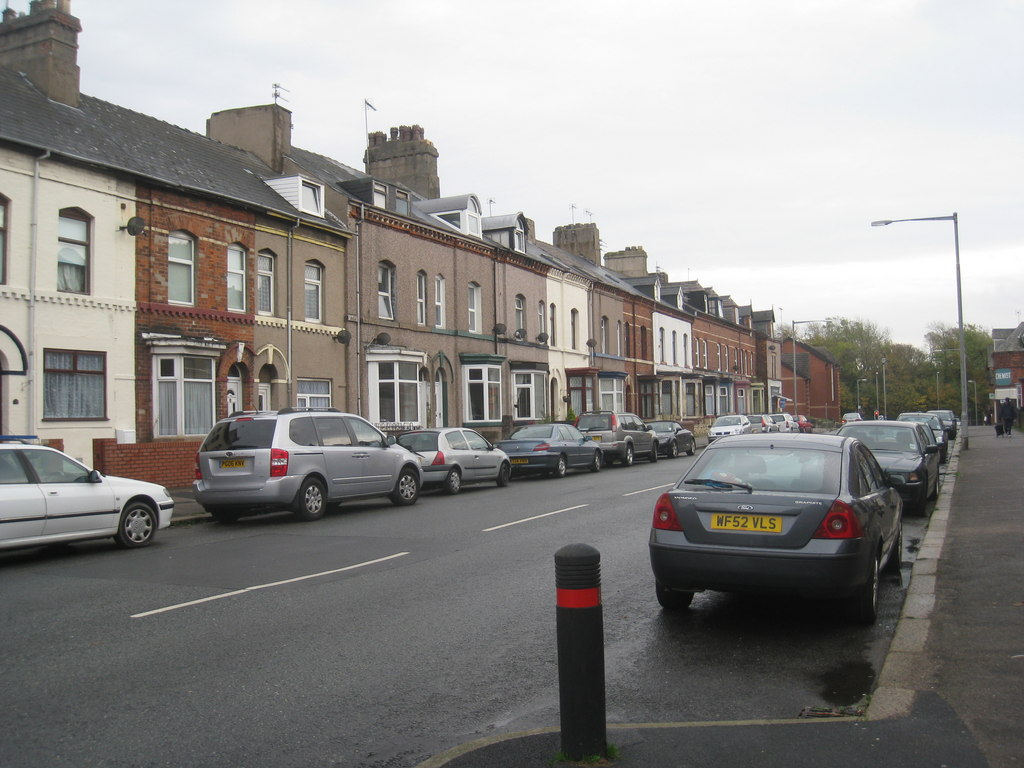
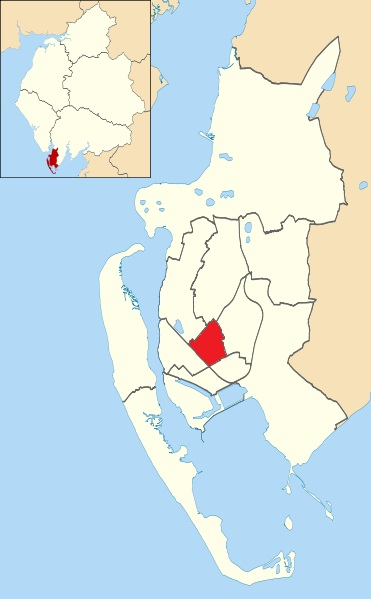
- Ainslie Street east looking towards Barrow Park Parkside shown within Barrow-in-Furness
- Population: 5,584 (2011.Ward)
- Unitary authority: Westmorland and Furness
- Ceremonial county: Cumbria
- Region: North West
- Country: England
- Sovereign state: United Kingdom
- Post town: BARROW-IN-FURNESS
- Postcode district: LA
- Dialling code: 01229
- Police: Cumbria
- Fire: Cumbria
- Ambulance: North West
- UK Parliament: Barrow and Furness

Parkside is an area, current Town Council ward and former district-level ward of Barrow-in-Furness, Cumbria, England. It is bordered by Hindpool, Ormsgill, Hawcoat, Newbarns and Risedale and had a population of 5,742 in 2001, reducing to 5,584 at the 2011 Census. It is one of the town's most centralised wards and contains Barrow's main park (hence the ward's name), as well as the newly established Furness Academy.

Abbey Road - Barrow's principal road runs down the entire western side of Parkside. The majority of housing to the west of Abbey Road is terraced and semi-detached, whilst the eastern side of Parkside is predominantly parkland and fields with the exception of some semi and detached housing.

Whilst still an electoral ward for Barrow Town Council, the ward was combined at a district/ local authority level with Ormsgill ward in April 2023 following formation of the new Westmorland and Furness Local Authority.

There are a number of place of worship in Parkside including Abbey Road Baptist Church, Spring Mount Christian Fellowship and Trinity Church Centre.

Barrow's first synagogue was founded in 1902 on Abbey Road although it closed less than twenty years later.

Parkside's ward is of the first to have a Communist Party of Britain council member.

== Demographics ==
Vital statistics	Parkside	Barrow-in-Furness	England
Religious individuals	81.93%	81.61%	77.71%
Non-religious individuals	11.11%	10.79%	14.59%
Religion withheld	6.95%	7.59%	7.69%
Individuals in fairly good to good health	89.99%	86.75%	90.97%
Individuals in bad health	10.01%	13.25%	9.03%
People aged 16–74 who are economically active	67.73%	60.84%	66.87%
People aged 16–74 who aren't economically active	32.27%	39.16%	33.13%
People aged 16–74 with no qualifications	24.52%	32.82%	28.85%
