= Timeline of Carlisle =

The following is a timeline of the history of the city of Carlisle, Cumbria, England, United Kingdom.

== Prior to the 19th century ==
- Reign of emperor Nero - Carlisle is burned down.
- 73 - Winter: a Roman timber fort is constructed in what is now the site of Carlisle Castle.
- 83 - the Roman fort at Carlisle is reconstructed.
- 685 - Saint Cuthbert visits Carlisle.
- 1092 - William II invades the area surrounding Carlisle and reincorporates Carlisle into England after it had been taken by the Scots.
- 1093 - construction on Carlisle Castle begins.
- 1112 - Carlisle Castle is reconstructed.
- 1113 - an Augustinian priory becomes Carlisle Cathedral.
- October 1664-June 25, 1665 - Siege of Carlisle takes place in which Covenanters and Parliamentarians besieged Carlisle Castle which was held by Royalist forces loyal to King Charles I during the First English Civil War.
- 1745 - Jacobite Uprising of 1745
  - 13-15 November: Siege of Carlisle takes place during the Jacobite Rising of 1745 in which Jacobite forces led by Charles Edward Stuart successfully took over Carlisle and besieged Carlisle Castle.
  - 21-30 December: Siege of Carlisle takes place during the Jacobite Rising of 1745 in which Government forces led by Prince William recaptured Carlisle.
  - 30 December: 384 Jacobite prisoners are taken after the Siege of Carlisle. Some are executed while others are sentenced to transportation to the West Indies.

== 19th century ==
- 1823 - a canal is built in Port Carlisle to transport goods produced in the city.
- 1838 - the post of the Governor of Carlisle as garrison commander is abolished.
- 1874 - the arts centre, Strand Road drill hall is opened.

== 20th century ==
- 1904 - 17 May: Carlisle United F.C. is formed at Shaddongate United's annual general meeting.
- 1986 - a shopping centre is built.

== 21st century ==
- 2005 - 7 January: the rivers Eden, Caldew and Petteril burst their banks due to as much as 180 mm rainfall upstream that day. 2,700 homes were flooded and three people died.
- 2015 - 5-6 December: Storm Desmond causes flooding to occur in Carlisle. An estimated amount of 2,200 to 3,500 homes were flooded.
