= Queen Katherine Street drill hall, Kendal =

Military building in Kendal, Cumbria, England

Queen Katherine Street drill hall
- Kendal
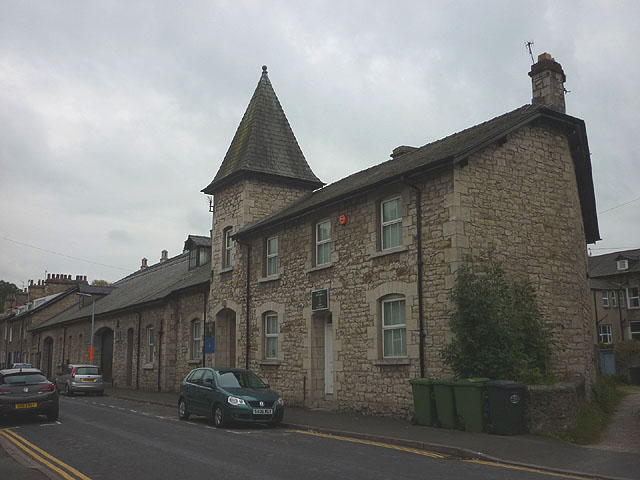
- Queen Katherine Street drill hall

Site information
- Type: Drill hall

Location
- Location in South Lakeland Location in Cumbria
- Coordinates: 54.32475°N 2.74297°W

Site history
- Built: Late 19th century
- Built for: War Office
- In use: Late 19th century–1999

The Queen Katherine Street drill hall is a former military installation located on Queen Katherine Street, off Aynam Road, in Kendal, Cumbria, England.

== History ==
The building was designed as the base for the Westmorland-based companies (F and G Companies) of the 1st Volunteer Battalion, The Border Regiment and was built in the late 19th century. These companies became part of the 4th (Cumberland and Westmorland) Battalion, The Border Regiment in 1908. The companies were mobilised at the drill hall in August 1914 before being deployed to India. A Squadron, Westmorland and Cumberland Yeomanry and the 3rd West Lancashire Field Ambulance, Royal Army Medical Corps were also based at the drill hall.

After the Strand Road drill hall in Carlisle closed, the Queen Katherine Street drill hall became the headquarters for the whole battalion. The presence at the drill was reduced to a single company, D (The Westmorland) Company, 4th (Territorial) Battalion, The Border Regiment in 1967. This unit evolved to become B (4th Border Regiment) Company, Northumbrian Volunteers in 1971, C Company, 4th (Volunteer) Battalion, The King's Own Royal Border Regiment in 1975 and B Company, 4th (Volunteer) Battalion, The King's Own Royal Border Regiment in 1988. The presence at the drill was further reduced to a mortar platoon in 1992 and ceased altogether in 1999.

== Current units ==
Current units at the site are:

- Kendal Detachment, Cumbria Army Cadet Force
- 1127 (Kendal) Squadron, Cumbria & Lancashire Wing, Air Training Corps
