= Old Town Hall, Carlisle =

Municipal building in Carlisle, Cumbria, England

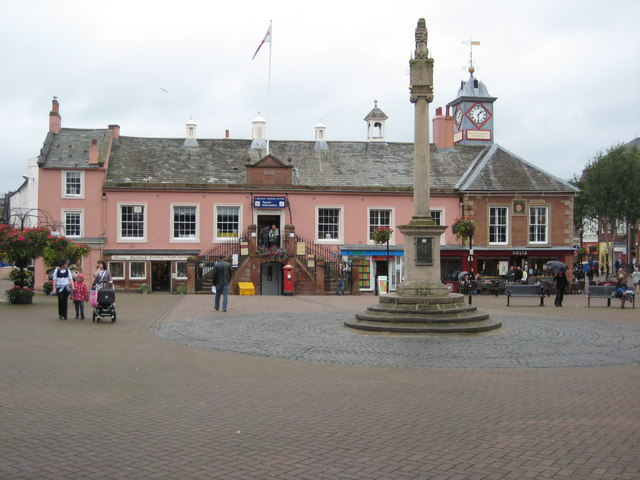
- Old Town Hall

- Shown in Cumbria
- 54.8948°N 2.9358°W
- Location: Market Place, Carlisle

History
- Built: 1669

Listed Building – Grade I
- Designated: 1 June 1949
- Reference no.: 1218104

The Old Town Hall is a municipal building in the Market Place, Carlisle, England. It is a Grade I listed building.

== History ==
The current building was commissioned to replace an earlier "moot hall" on the site which dated back to 1345. The new building, with commercial facilities on the ground floor and assembly rooms on the first floor, was completed in 1669. It was extended to the east with an extra section incorporating a clock tower in 1717 and to the west with an extra three-storey section in the 19th century. The market cross in front of the town hall, which was designed by Thomas Machell and carved from stone by Thomas Addison, with its sundial and a lion holding a scroll with the city's coat of arms, was erected in 1682.

In 1853 the first pillar box in the United Kingdom was installed nearby and a replica "Penfold" pillar box, in the style of the original post boxes designed by William Penfold with acanthus leaves, balls and the Royal coat of arms, was subsequently erected outside the town hall to commemorate this. The original clock in the tower of the town hall, which had been made by John Sanderson of Wigton, was replaced with a modern mechanism, made by Potts of Leeds, in 1900.

The assembly rooms were used for the courts of assize until 1881 and magistrates' courts were held there until 1941. Queen Elizabeth II, accompanied by the Duke of Edinburgh, visited the building to mark the city's 800th anniversary and signed the visitors' book there in October 1958.

The building remained the headquarters of the County Borough of Carlisle until the council moved to Carlisle Civic Centre in Rickergate in March 1964. After the building became vacant, a tourist information centre was established on the first floor.

A major restoration of the building, involving asbestos removal, repairs to the roof and improved disabled access, was carried out at a cost of £0.5 million in 2013. A 17th-century court book was discovered in the clock tower during the restoration work. Further improvements, involving restoration of the original wood panelling and fireplaces, was carried out in the assembly rooms in 2017; the assembly rooms hosted the first wedding in the building's history later that year.
