= Denton Holme =

Suburb of Carlisle, Cumbria, England

Coordinates: 54.889°N 2.941°W

Denton Holme is an inner city district in Carlisle, Cumbria, England. The population of this ward was 6,383, according to the 2011 census.

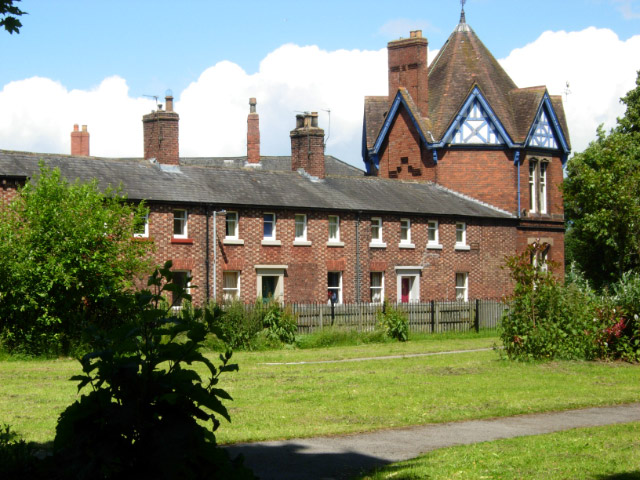
Bridge Terrace, Denton Holme

Denton Holme is usually regarded as a "village within the city" and is situated to the immediate south west of the city centre on the western bank of the River Caldew. A man-made stream or mill race known as the Little Caldew flows through and underneath the area.

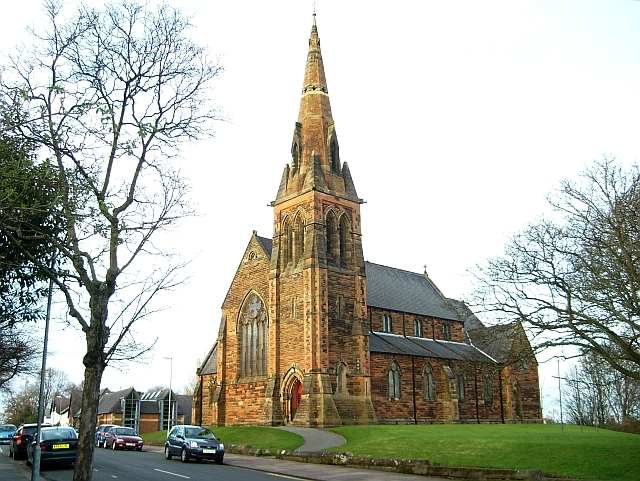
St. James's Church, Denton Holme

Today it is mostly a residential area, but in the nineteenth century and most of the twentieth century, along with the neighbouring districts of Caldewgate and Wapping, it was Carlisle's main industrial district with many textile mills, engineering works and other factories such as car seat manufacturers and confectioners. Very few factories remain today, although the last mill, Ferguson Brothers, owned by Coats Viyella, at Holme Head, only closed in the 1990s.

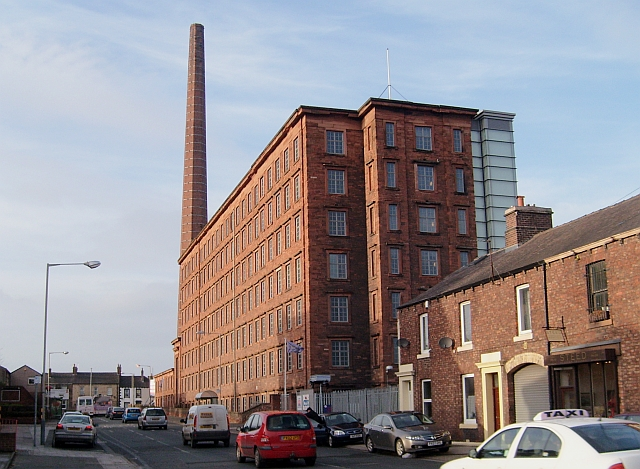
Dixon's Chimney and Shaddon Mill

Most of the housing is red-brick terraced, and a few are listed buildings, such as Bridge Terrace, built in the 1850s. Many side streets are still cobbled rather than tarmacked, although some new housing has been built recently, and some former factories have been converted into flats.

The main street, Denton Street, has many small shops and other businesses, including a bingo hall and a branch of the Cumberland Building Society, which closed in 2024. There was also a cinema in the suburb located in what is now the Bingo hall.

There is a primary school at Holme Head, built by and named after Robert Ferguson, and the former Morley Street School has been converted into a public library.

Four churches are in Denton Holme: the Church of England Parish Church, St James, Carlisle Christian Fellowship, and The Lighthouse Baptist Church.

At Shaddon Mill, on the boundary of Denton Holme and Caldewgate, stands a very tall chimney which was once the tallest in the UK. This structure, known as "Dixon's Chimney," is now slightly short of its original height, has recently been restored, and is a well-known local landmark. It is named after its first owner, Peter Dixon, who built the mill in 1835–6. The architect was Richard Tattersall.

Labour Member of Parliament Julie Minns, elected as the first female MP for Carlisle at the 2024 UK general election, was born in the district.
