= Carlisle Civic Centre =

Municipal building in Carlisle, Cumbria, England

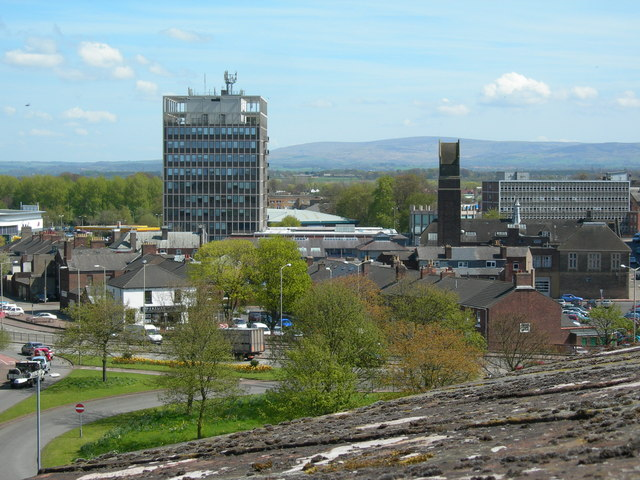
- Carlisle Civic Centre

- Shown in Cumbria
- 54.8975°N 2.9347°W
- Location: Rickergate, Carlisle

History
- Built: 1964
- Built by: John Laing & Son

Site notes
- Architect(s): Charles B. Pearson and Partners
- Architectural style: Modernist style

Carlisle Civic Centre is a municipal building in Rickergate, Carlisle, England. It was the headquarters of Carlisle City Council.

== History ==
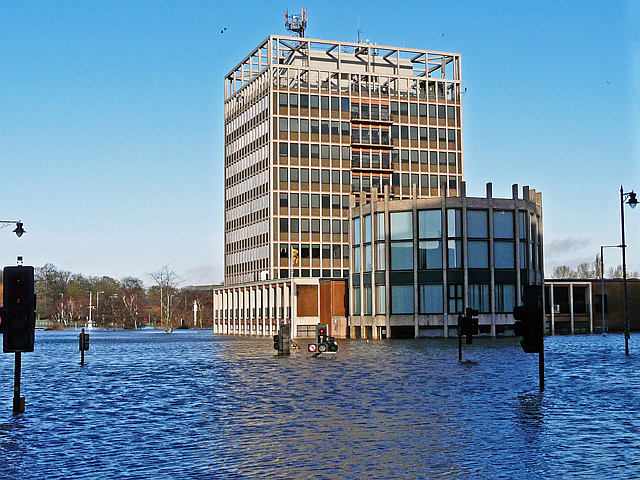
Carlisle Civic Centre in the floodwater, December 2015

The civic centre was commissioned to replace the aging Town Hall in the Market Place. The new building, which was designed by Charles B. Pearson and Partners in the Modernist style and built by John Laing & Son at a cost of £820,000, was completed in March 1964. The design involved a tower, 44 metres (144 ft) high, as well as a separate two-storey octagonal building to accommodate the council chamber. In 1965, a huge back-lit mural depicting local scenes, which had been painted by Trewin Copplestone, was hung in the council chamber. The octagonal building, sometimes referred to as "the rotunda" was commended in the 1966 national Civic Trust Awards.

Queen Elizabeth II, accompanied by the Duke of Edinburgh, visited Carlisle Civic Centre in March 1978.

George Ferguson, a former President of the Royal Institute of British Architects, caused controversy when he referred to the civic centre as a "soulless office block" in an article in the Sunday Times in October 2004. The council undertook a consultation on options for developing the site in 2014; the consultation generated a strong response including a petition which demonstrated that there was considerable local opposition to any proposals which involved demolition of the building. The civic centre was damaged when it was completely surrounded by water during the local flooding which badly affected Carlisle and its surrounding areas in December 2015.

In May 2020, the council approved a scheme of works, to be undertaken by local contractor Story Construction, to refurbish the main building at a cost of £3.6 million; the scheme chosen also involved the demolition of the octagonal building which accommodated the council chamber. The works additionally involved the re-configuration of the ground floor of the main building to create a more versatile council chamber, a new customer contact centre and additional meeting space.

In January 2021 The Guardian listed the Civic Centre as one of Britain's Brutalist buildings most at risk of demolition and development. It was included in Brutal North: Post-War Modernist Architecture in the North of England, Simon Phipps's photographic study of Brutalist architecture.

Carlisle City Council was abolished in April 2023, on the formation of the new unitary authority, Cumberland Council, and the Civic Centre serves as a meeting place for the new council.
