= Cavaghan & Gray =

Food manufacturing business in Carlisle, England

Cavaghan & Gray is a food manufacturing business based in Carlisle, England, which is now owned by 2 Sisters Food Group. Up until 2004, when the London Road factory closed, it was the largest employer in Carlisle. The firm still has sites at Eastern Way and Durranhill Riverbank. At one time the company traded under the brand name of Cavray and the firm is known to locals as Cavvies

== History ==
The company was founded by Thomas Cavaghan and Jonathan Gray with the help of a Mr. Collins, under the name of Cavaghan, Collin and Gray. The business started out as a butchery, with a modest staff of 8 and small profits. By the mid-1920s Mr. Gray and Mr. Collins had left and the company traded under the name of Cavaghan and Gray. By this time Thomas Cavaghan Jr. had also entered the company.

The company later incurred difficulties through the depression of the 1930s, resulting in the sale of land and property. In 1937 Thomas Cavaghan Sr. died and the running of the company was left to his three sons, George, Henry and Thomas Jr. The company began to prosper again during the Second World War, with a number of new farms and sites being purchased and improvements made to the factories.

In 1957 there was once again a reshuffle after the death of Thomas Cavaghan Jr. George had also died during the war and so Henry Cavaghan took up the position of chairman with Alec Crawford, Brian Seery and Margaret Cavaghan on the board of directors.

By the 1960s and 1970s the company was producing food for Marks & Spencer and Heinz, enabling the company to build itself into the prospering business that it is today.

In 1998 the company by then called Cavaghan & Gray Group plc was sold to Northern Foods for around £79 million.
