= Currock =

Suburb of Carlisle, Cumbria, England

Coordinates: 54.88206°N 2.928317°W

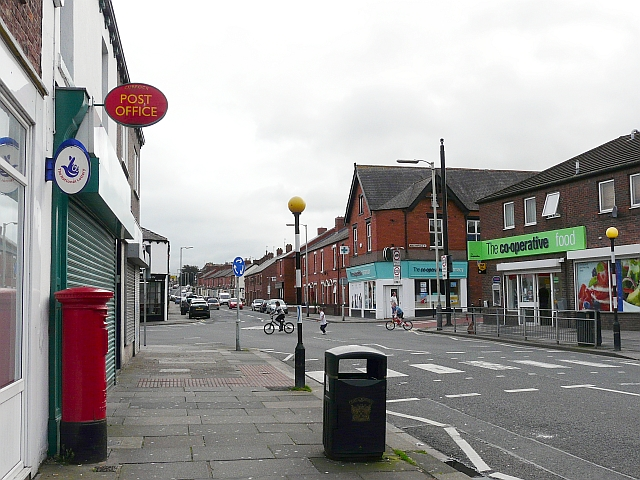
- Currock Crossroads

- Location in the former Carlisle district, Cumbria Location within Cumbria
- Population: 6,218 (2011.ward)
- Unitary authority: Cumberland
- Ceremonial county: Cumbria
- Region: North West
- Country: England
- Sovereign state: United Kingdom
- Postcode district: CA
- Police: Cumbria
- Fire: Cumbria
- Ambulance: North West

Currock is a southern suburb of Carlisle, Cumbria, England. It contains a boating lake. It had a bowling club until 2011.
