= Northumbrian Volunteers =

- Active: 1971–1975
- Allegiance: United Kingdom
- Branch: British Army
- Role: Line Infantry
- Size: One Battalion
- Garrison/HQ: Bishop Auckland

Commanders
- Honorary Colonel: Major-General Theodore Birkbeck, CB, CBE, DSO, JP

The Northumbrian Volunteers was a short-lived Territorial Army infantry regiment of the British Army, in existence from 1971 to 1975.

== History ==
The regiment was formed on 1 April 1971, as the successor to Territorial Army infantry battalions of Cumbria, Durham, and Northumberland that had been reduced under the 1966 Defence White Paper and formation of the TAVR. Its initial structure was as follows:

- A (Durham Royal Artillery) Battery, at Horden
  (from the County of Durham Regiment, Royal Artillery)
- B (4th Border Regiment) Company, at Queen Katherine Street Drill Hall, Kendal and Penrith
  (from 4th Battalion, Border Regiment)
- C (4th/5th/6th Royal Northumberland Fusiliers) Company, at Newcastle upon Tyne and Gosforth
  (from 4th/5th/6th Battalion, Royal Northumberland Fusiliers)
- D (7th Royal Northumberland Fusiliers) Company, at Alnwick and Berwick-upon-Tweed
  (from 7th Battalion, Royal Northumberland Fusiliers)
- E (6th/8th Durham Light Infantry) Company, at Horden
  (from 6th/8th Battalion, Durham Light Infantry)

However, not long after formation, the army placed territorial infantry battalions back under the control of the regular regiments, and so the battalion's companies were split up as follows: HQ (having been formed sometime in the previous four years), A, and E Companies to 7th Battalion, The Light Infantry (Volunteers), as HQ, A, and B Companies respectively; B Company to 4th (Volunteer) Battalion, King's Own Royal Border Regiment, as C Company; and C and D Companies to 6th (Volunteer) Battalion, Royal Regiment of Fusiliers, as Y and HQ Companies respectively.

== Honorary Colonel ==
1972–1975: Major-General Theodore H. Birkbeck, CB, CBE, DSO, JP

=== Deputy Honorary Colonels ===
The individual companies each maintained a Deputy Honorary Colonel in succession to the previous unit they had been reduced from.

- A Battery: Sir Robert Chapman, 2nd Baronet, CBE, TD, JP, DL
- B Company: Major-General Theodore H. Birkbeck, CB, CBE, DSO, JP
- C Company: Colonel John R.N. Bell, TD
- D Company: Captain Hugh Percy, 10th Duke of Northumberland
- E Company: Captain William P. Catesby, DL
