= Carlisle College =

Further education college in England

Coordinates: 54.896°N 2.929°W

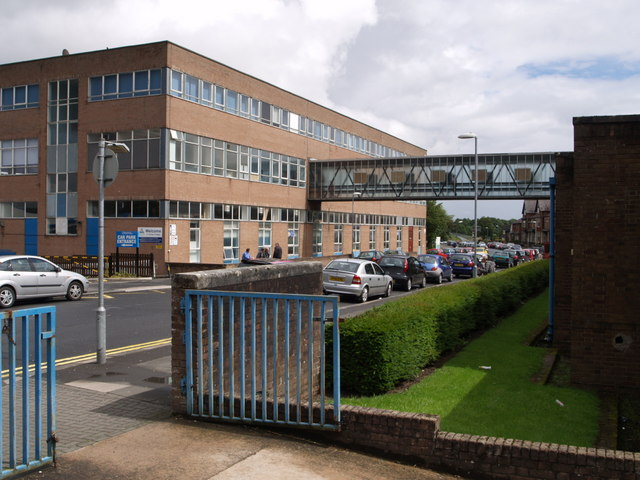
- Established: 1954
- Principal: Sarah McGrath
- Students: 2,800
- Location: Carlisle, UK
- Website: www.carlisle.ac.uk

Carlisle College is a further education college serving the post 16 with an extensive range of higher and further education, professional qualifications, and community programmes in Carlisle, Cumbria and the surrounding area. The college, located in Carlisle city centre has more than 2,800 students enrolled each year and continues to grow.

In April 2017 Carlisle College merged with NCG. Joining with partner colleges Kidderminster College, Lewisham College, Newcastle College, Newcastle Sixth Form College, Southwark College and West Lancashire College.

== Courses ==
Carlisle College offers an extensive range of higher and further education, professional qualifications, and community programmes. It primarily caters to a younger demographic, but has a notable amount of mature students as well.

This facility offers apprenticeships, alternative options to Sixth Form studies, additional qualifications, and options to further one's studies with a degree.

Over 100 courses and 350+ employer partners are available at Carlisle College varying from Sport, Music and Performing Arts, Health & Social Care or Public Services among others.

== Higher Education ==
The subject areas are based on local market needs and include; Accounting, Business, Leadership & Management, Computing, Engineering and Teacher Training.

== Ofsted ==
In November 2024 Ofsted confirmed that Carlisle College continues to be a GOOD provider.

Ofsted Inspection Report

== Apprenticeships ==
Carlisle College have apprenticeship programmes that offer vocational training and work-based learning experiences in collaboration with industry partners to meet specific company requirements.

== Redevelopment ==
In 2014, The college built a new £5.3m "digital-and-creative-arts complex" which opened at the former Strand Road drill hall.

The College have developed an Advanced Manufacturing Centre (AMC) as well investing in eco technologies and car charging insulation.
