= Strand Road drill hall, Carlisle =

Arts centre in Carlisle, Cumbria, England

Strand Road drill hall
- Carlisle
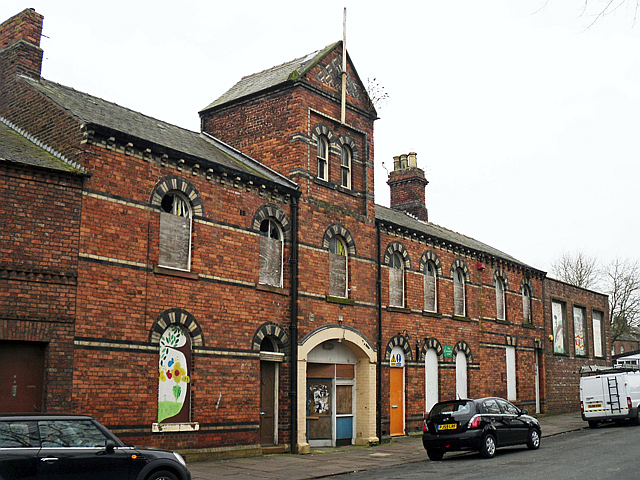
- Strand Road drill hall

Site information
- Type: Drill hall

Location
- Location in Cumbria
- Coordinates: 54.89619°N 2.93106°W

Site history
- Built: 1873–1874
- Built for: War Office
- In use: 1874–Present

The Strand Road drill hall is an arts center and former military installation in Carlisle, Cumbria.

== History ==
The building was designed as the headquarters of Carlisle Rifle Volunteers on land granted by the Duke of Devonshire and was built between 1873 and 1874. This unit evolved to become the 1st Volunteer Battalion, The Border Regiment in 1883 and the 4th (Cumberland and Westmorland) Battalion, The Border Regiment in 1908. The battalion was mobilised at the drill hall in August 1914 before being deployed to India. The building went on to serve as the head office of the East Cumberland National Shell Factory in September 1915. After the battalion headquarters moved to the Queen Katherine Street drill hall in Kendal, the Strand Road drill hall was decommissioned and then stood vacant for many years before being converted and extended for use as the home of the Carlisle College Digital and Creative Arts Centre which opened at its new premises in September 2014.
