= Carlisle =

City in Cumbria, England

- City
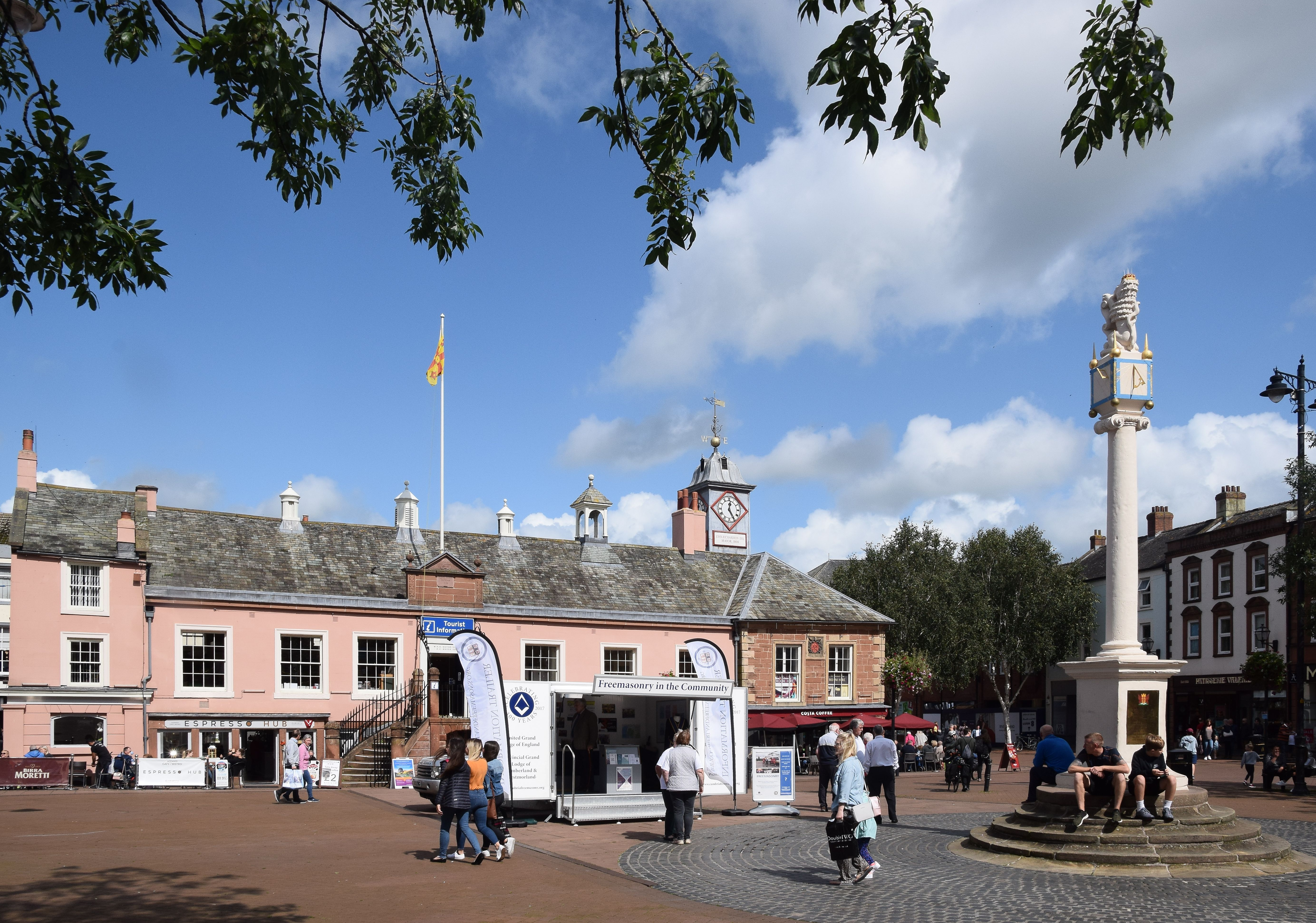
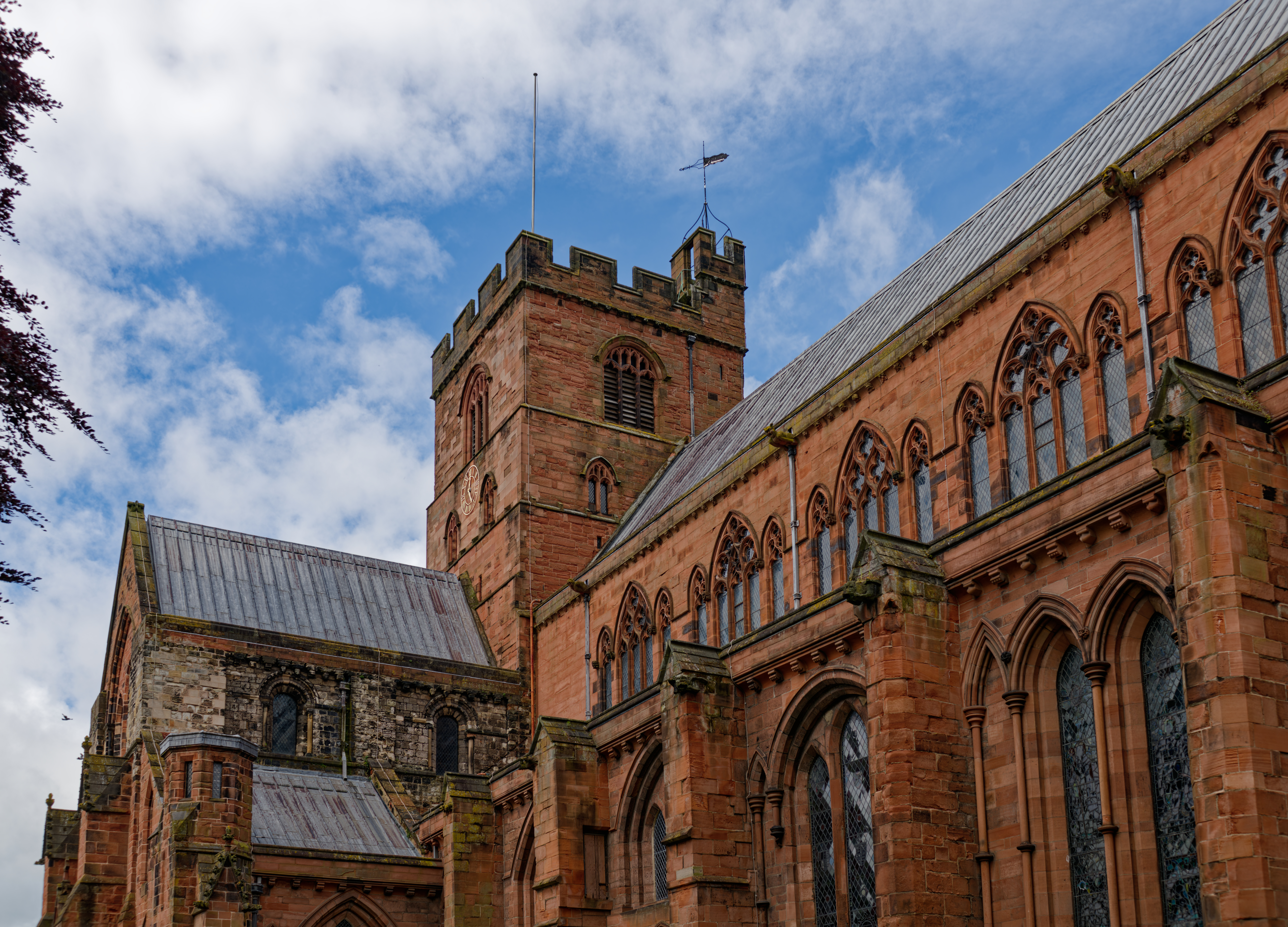
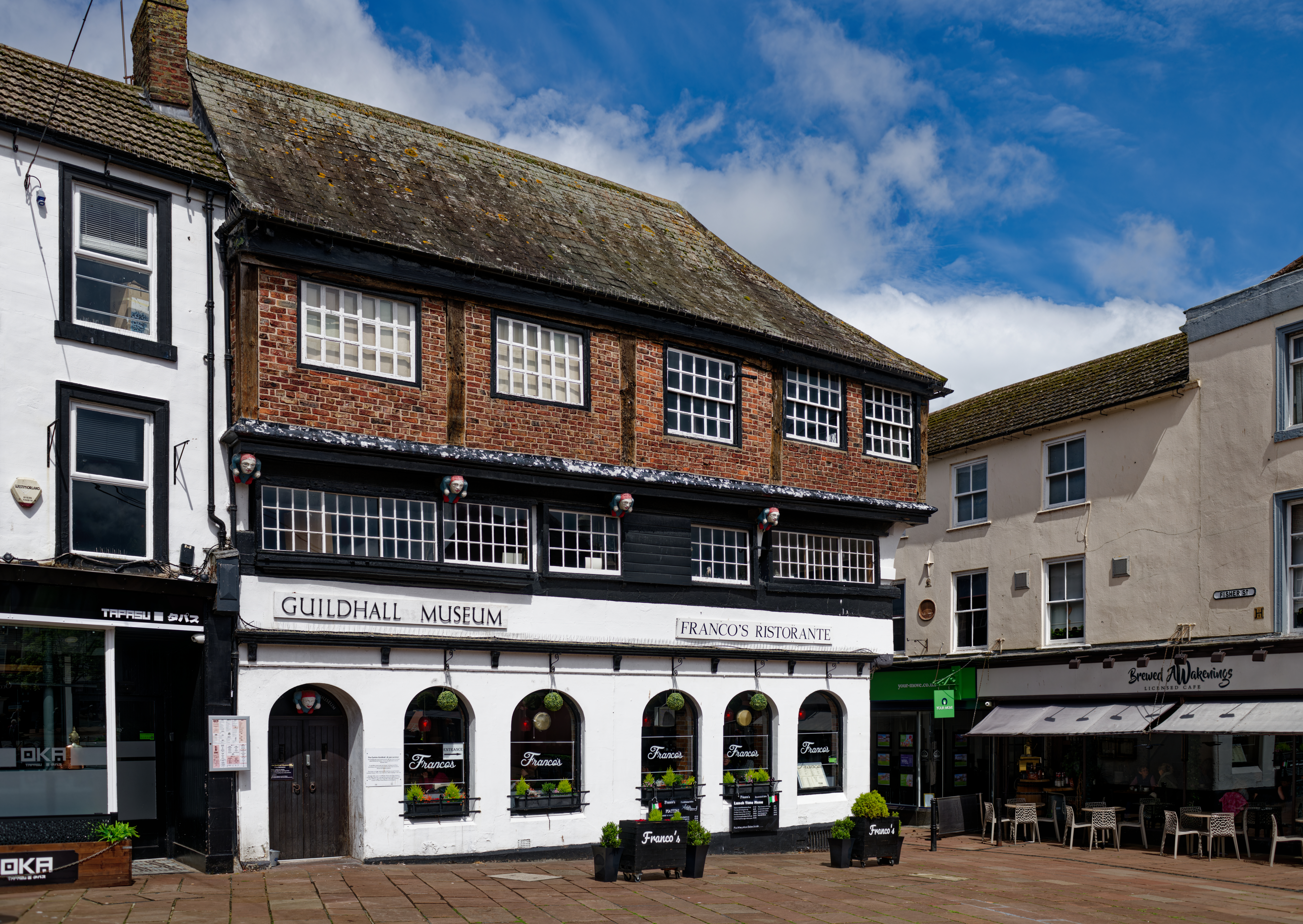
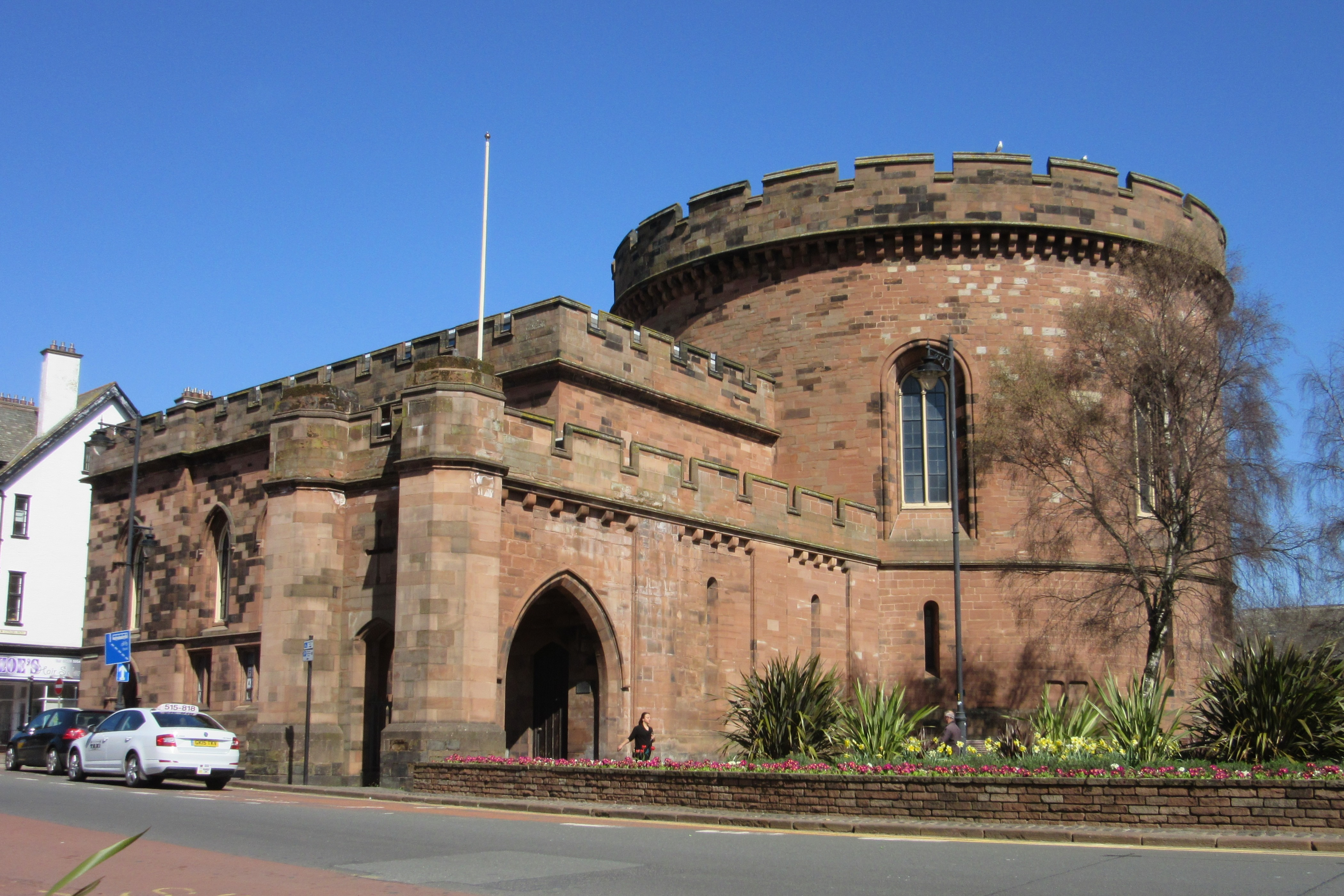
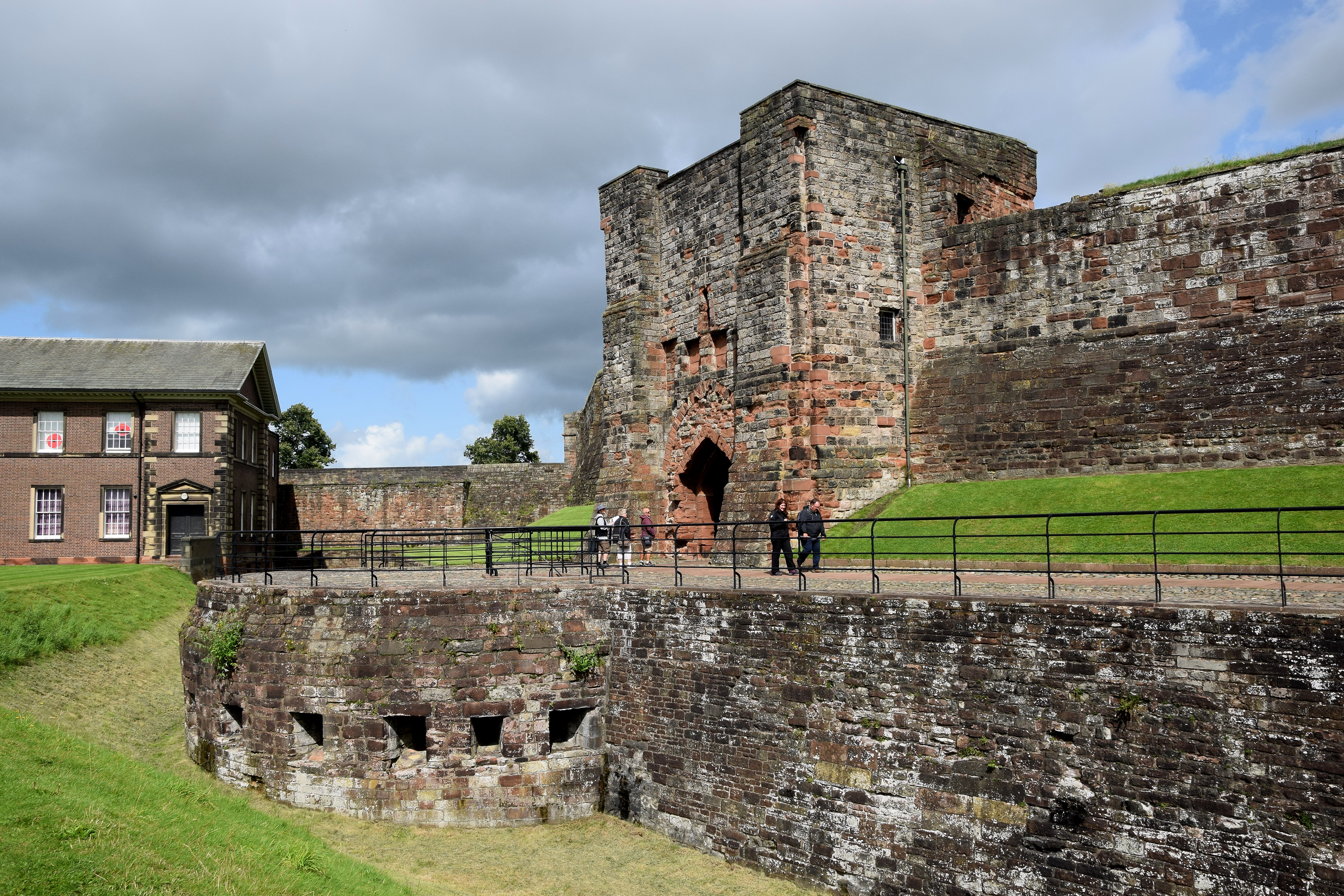
- Old Town Hall Cathedral Guildhall Museum Citadel Castle

- Location within Cumbria
- Population: 77,730 (built up area, 2021)
- OS grid reference: NY395555
  - London: 261 mi (420 km) SSE
- Unitary authority: Cumberland
- Ceremonial county: Cumbria
- Region: North West
- Country: England
- Sovereign state: United Kingdom
- Post town: Carlisle
- Postcode district: CA1-CA6
- Dialling code: 01228
- Police: Cumbria
- Fire: Cumbria
- Ambulance: North West
- UK Parliament: Carlisle

Carlisle (/kɑːr.ˈlaɪl/ kar-LYLE, locally /ˈkɑːr.laɪl/ KAR-lyle; from the Cumbric: Caer Luel) is a city located in the Cumberland district of Cumbria, England. It is the largest settlement and only city in Cumbria. In 2021, it had a population of 77,730.

Carlisle was founded as a Roman settlement called Luguvalium to serve forts along Hadrian's Wall, though it may have earlier origins. Nicknamed the 'Great Border City' due to its proximity to Scotland (being located eight miles or thirteen kilometres south of the current Anglo-Scottish border), the city and its castle became an important military stronghold in the Middle Ages. The castle served as a prison for Mary, Queen of Scots in 1568 and currently hosts the Duke of Lancaster's Regiment and the Border Regiment Museum. A priory was built in the early 12th century, which subsequently became Carlisle Cathedral in 1133 on the creation of the Diocese of Carlisle. As the seat of a diocese, Carlisle therefore gained city status. Carlisle also served as the county town of the historic county of Cumberland from the county's creation in the 12th century.

In the 19th century, the introduction of textile manufacture during the Industrial Revolution began a process of socioeconomic transformation in Carlisle, which developed into a densely populated mill town. This, combined with its strategic position, allowed for the development of Carlisle as an important railway town, with seven railway companies sharing Carlisle railway station.

== History ==
=== Ancient Carlisle ===
The ancient history of Carlisle is derived mainly from archaeological evidence and the works of the Roman historian Tacitus. The earliest recorded inhabitants in the area were the Carvetii tribe of Britons who made up the main population of ancient Cumbria and North Lancashire. According to the mediaeval historians Boethius and John of Fordun, Carlisle existed before the arrival of the Romans in Britain and was one of the strongest British towns at the time. In the time of the emperor Nero, it was said to have burned down. The Roman settlement was named Luguvalium, based on a native name that has been reconstructed as Brittonic *Luguwaljon, "[city] of Luguwalos", a masculine Celtic given name meaning "strength of Lugus".

Excavations undertaken along Annetwell Street in the 1970s dated the Roman timber fort constructed at the site of present Carlisle Castle to the winter of AD 73. It protected a strategic location on the Roman road to the north and overlooking the confluence of the Caldew and Eden rivers.

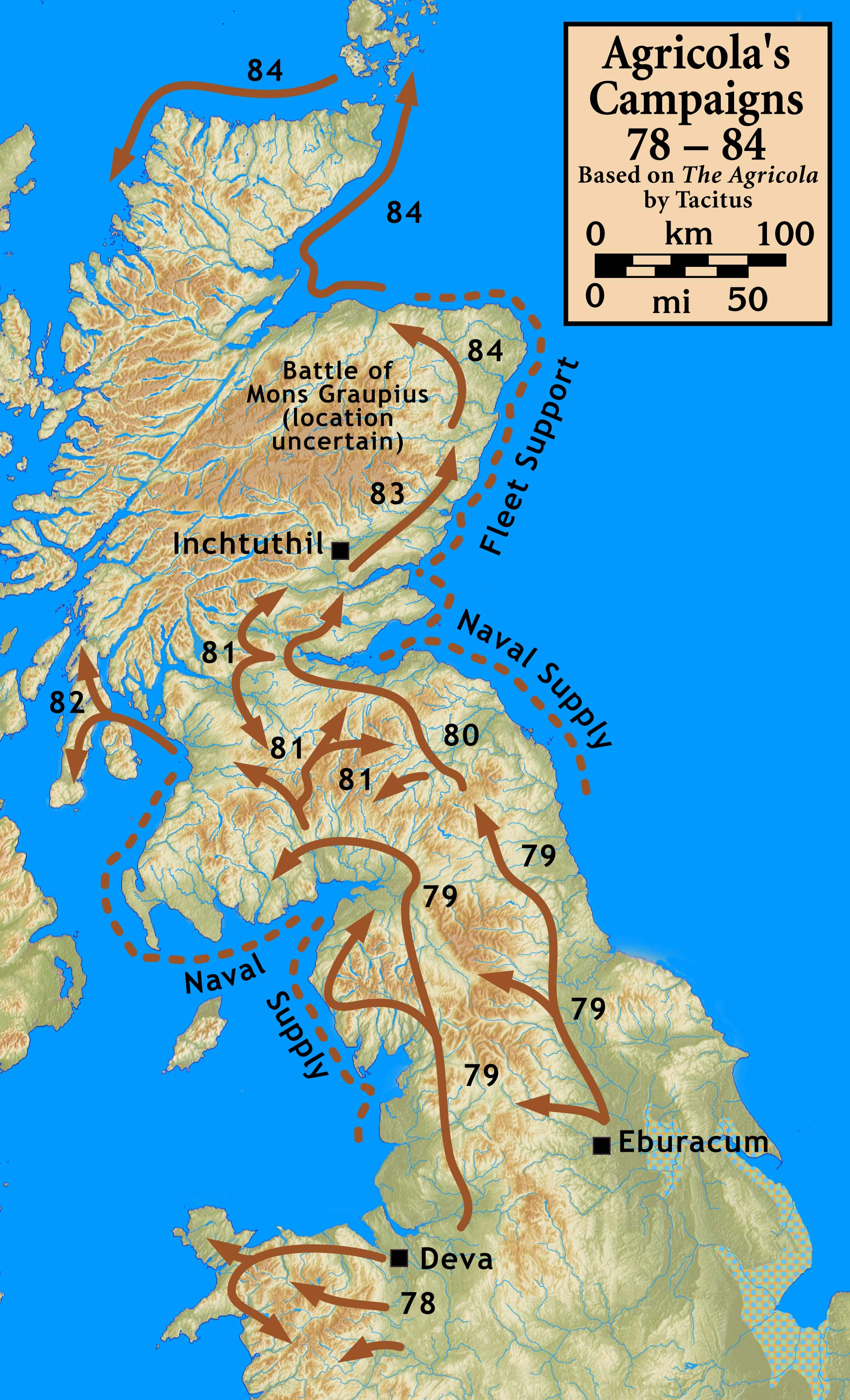
General Gnaeus Julius Agricola advances through Carlisle in AD 79.

The fort at Carlisle was reconstructed in AD 83 using oak timbers from further afield, rather than local alder as a possible result of the increased Roman control of the area. At this time the Roman fort was garrisoned by a 500-strong cavalry regiment, the Ala Gallorum Sebosiana.

By the early 2nd century, Carlisle was established as a prominent stronghold. The 'Stanegate' frontier, which consisted of Luguvalium and several other forts in a line east to Corbridge, was proving a more stable frontier against the Picts than those established deeper into Caledonia. In AD 122, the province was visited by Hadrian, who approved a plan to build a wall the length of the frontier. A new fort, Petriana, was therefore built in the Stanwix area of the city north of the river on Hadrian's Wall. It was the largest fort along the wall and was completed in stone by around AD 130. Like Luguvalium, which lay within sight, Petriana housed a nominal 1,000-strong cavalry regiment, the Ala Gallorum Petriana, the sole regiment of this size along the wall. Hadrian's successor Antoninus Pius abandoned the frontier and attempted to move further north; he built the Antonine Wall between the firths of Forth and Clyde. It was not a success and, after 20 years, the garrisons returned to Hadrian's Wall.

At one time, Carlisle broke off from Rome when Marcus Carausius assumed power over the territory. He was assassinated and suffered damnatio memoriae, but a surviving reference to him has been uncovered in Carlisle. Coins excavated in the area suggest that Romans remained in Carlisle until the reign of Emperor Valentinian II, from AD 375 to AD 392.

=== Middle Ages ===
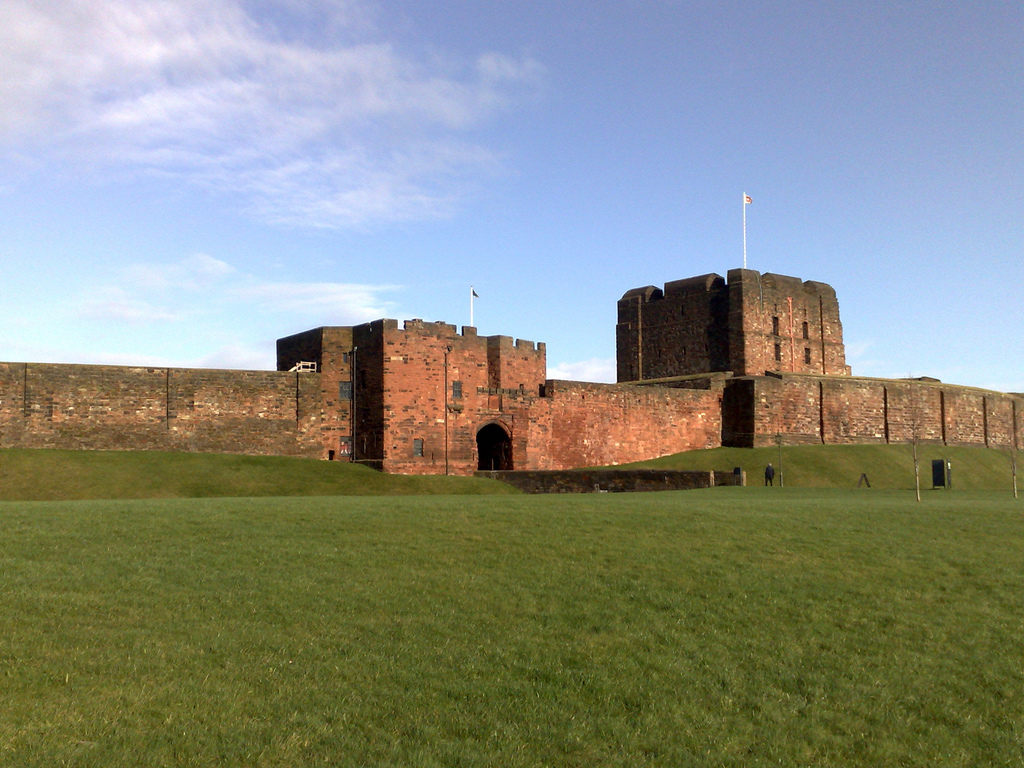
Carlisle Castle was built in the reign of William II.

The period of late antiquity after Roman rule saw Cumbria organised as the native British kingdom of Rheged. It is likely that the kingdom took its name from a major stronghold within it; this has been suggested to have been broadly coterminous with the Civitas Carvetiorum, Carlisle. King Urien and his son and successor Owain became the subjects of a great deal of Arthurian legend. Their capital has been identified as the Cair Ligualid listed by Nennius among the 28 cities of Britain, which later developed into Caer-luel, whence the city's modern Welsh name Caerliwelydd. Rheged came under Northumbrian control before 730, probably by inheritance after Rienmelth, daughter of Royth and great-granddaughter of Urien, married Oswy, King of Northumbria. For the rest of the first millennium, Carlisle was an important stronghold contested by several entities who warred over the area, including the Brythonic Kingdom of Strathclyde and the Anglian kingdom of Northumbria. In 685, St Cuthbert, visiting the Queen of Northumbria in her sister's monastery at Carlisle, was taken to see the city walls and a marvellously constructed Roman fountain.

By the time of the Norman Conquest of England in 1066, Carlisle was in the possession of the Scots. It was not recorded in the 1086 Domesday Book. This changed in 1092, when William the Conqueror's son William Rufus invaded the region and incorporated Carlisle into England. The construction of Carlisle Castle began in 1093 on the site of the Roman fort, south of the River Eden. The castle was rebuilt in stone in 1112, with a keep and the city walls. The walls enclosed the city south of the castle and included three gates to the east, south, and north called the Irish or Caldew Gate, the English or Botcher Gate, and the Scotch or Ricker Gate respectively. The names of the gates exist in road names in Carlisle today. Carlisle Cathedral was founded as an Augustinian priory and became a cathedral in 1133. In 1157, Carlisle became the seat of the new county of Carliol (a name that was originally an abbreviation of Latin Carlioliensis, meaning "[Bishop] of Carlisle"); in 1177 the county was renamed Cumberland.

The conquest of Cumberland was the beginning of a war between Scotland and England which saw the region centred around Carlisle change hands a number of times. It was a major stronghold after the construction of the castle. During the wars, the livelihood of the people on the borders was devastated by armies from both sides. Even when the countries were not at war, tension remained high, and royal authority in one or the other kingdom was often weak. The uncertainty of existence meant that communities or peoples kindred to each other sought security through their own strength and cunning, and they improved their livelihoods at their enemies' expense. These peoples were known as the Border Reivers and Carlisle was the major city within their territories.

The Reivers became so much of a nuisance to the Scottish and English governments that, in 1525, the Archbishop of Glasgow Gavin Dunbar cursed all the reivers of the borderlands. The curse was detailed in 1,069 words, beginning: "I curse their head and all the hairs of their head; I curse their face, their brain (innermost thoughts), their mouth, their nose, their tongue, their teeth, their forehead, their shoulders, their breast, their heart, their stomach, their back, their womb, their arms, their leggs, their hands, their feet and every part of their body, from the top of their head to the soles of their feet, before and behind, within and without."

=== Early Modern era ===
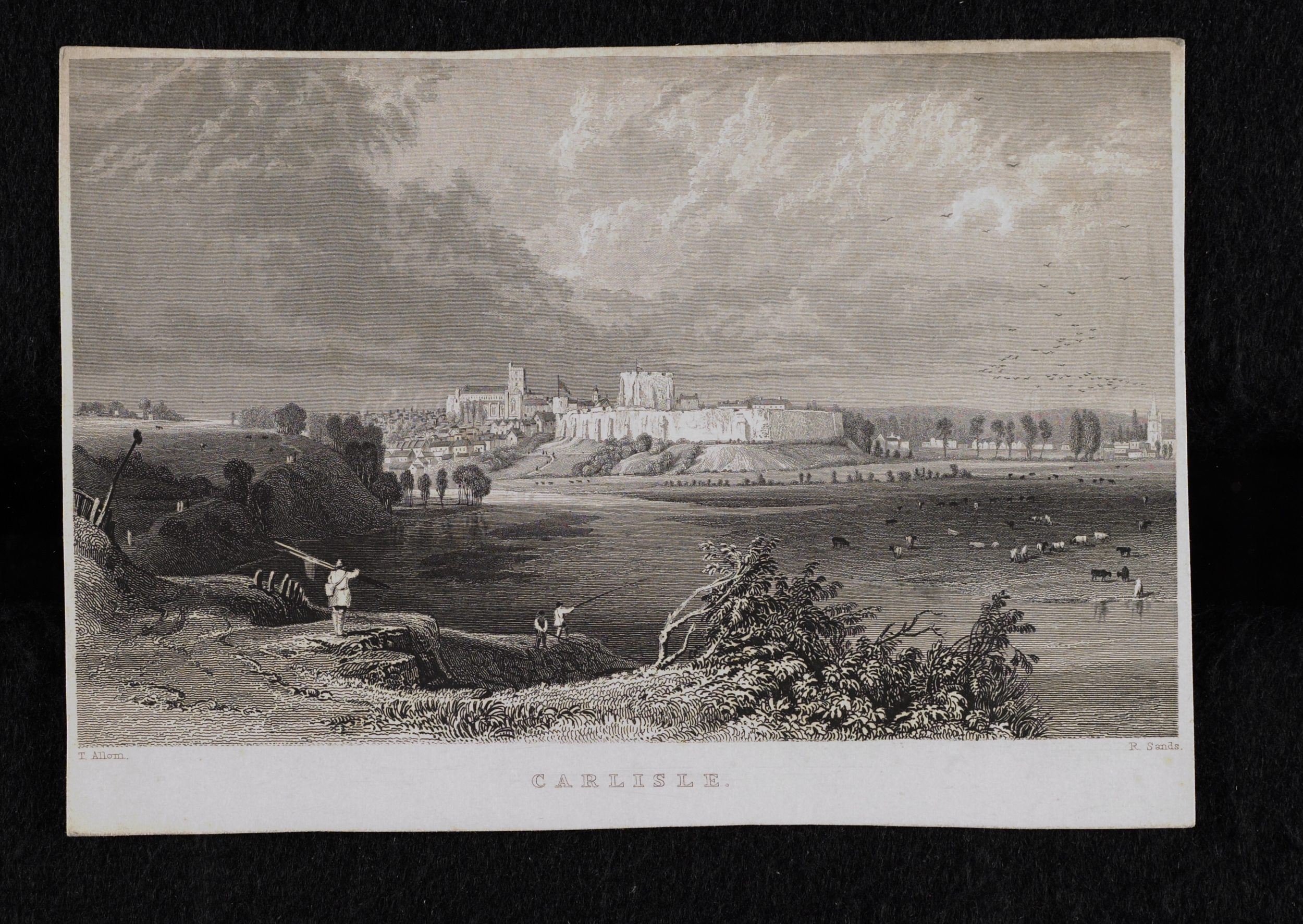
Historic view of Carlisle

After the Pilgrimage of Grace, Henry VIII, concerned at the weakness of his hold on the North, employed (1539) the engineer Stefan von Haschenperg to modernise the defences of Carlisle. von Haschenperg was sacked in 1543 for having "spent great treasures to no purpose"; but (by him and his successors) at the north end the castle towers were converted to artillery platforms, at the south the medieval Bochard gate was converted into the Citadel, an artillery fortification with two massive artillery towers. The death of Queen Elizabeth I in 1603 and her succession by James VI of Scotland as King James I of England allowed more determined and coordinated efforts to suppress reiving. The borderers were not quick to change their ways and many were hanged and whole families were exiled to Ireland. It was not until 1681 that the problem of the reivers was acknowledged as no longer an issue.

Following the personal union of the crowns, Carlisle Castle should have become obsolete as a frontier fortress, but the two kingdoms continued as separate states. In 1639, with war between the two kingdoms looming, the castle was refortified using stone from the cathedral cloisters. In 1642, the English Civil War broke out and the castle was garrisoned for the king. It endured a long siege from October 1644 until June 1645 when the Royalist forces surrendered after the Battle of Naseby. The city was occupied by a parliamentary garrison, and subsequently by their Scots allies. In 1646, the Scots, now holding Carlisle pending payment of monies owed them by the English Parliament, improved its fortifications, destroying the cathedral's nave to obtain the stone to rebuild the castle. Carlisle continued to remain a barracks thereafter. In 1698 travel writer Celia Fiennes wrote of Carlisle as having most of the trappings of a military town and that it was rife with alcohol and prostitutes.

In 1707, following a Treaty of Union being signed the previous year, acts of union were passed by the parliaments of England and Scotland, creating Great Britain, but Carlisle remained a garrison town. The tenth, and most recent siege in the city's history took place after Charles Edward Stuart took Carlisle in the Jacobite Rising of 1745. When the Jacobites retreated across the border to Scotland, they left a garrison of 400 men in Carlisle Castle. Ten days later Prince William, Duke of Cumberland took the castle and executed 31 Jacobites on the streets of Carlisle.

=== Industrial Revolution ===
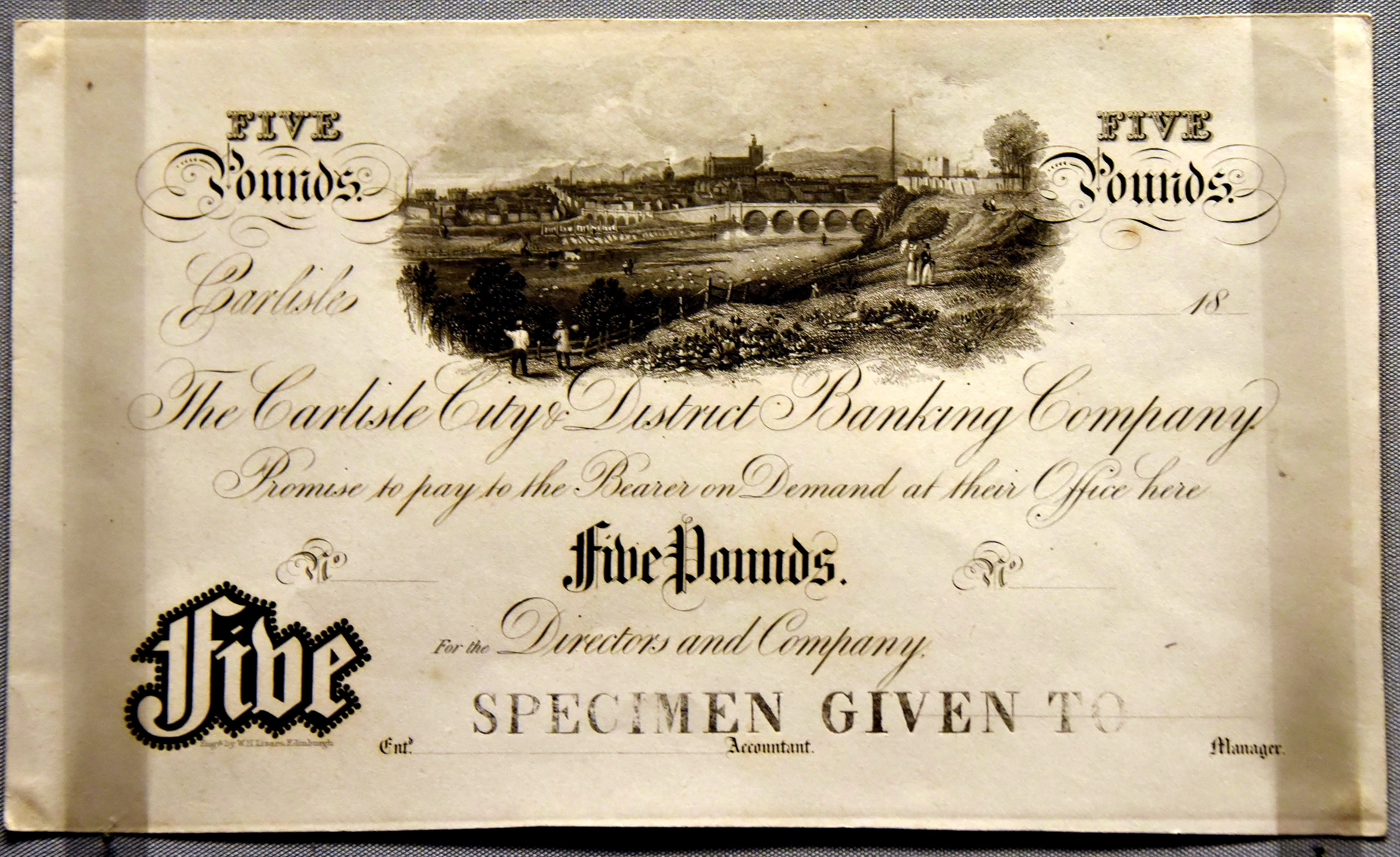
A banknote designed by William Home Lizars for Carlisle City and District Banking Company highlights the town's industrial features.

Although Carlisle continued to garrison soldiers, becoming the headquarters of the Border Regiment, the city's importance as a military town decreased as the industrial age took over. The post of Governor of Carlisle as garrison commander was abolished in 1838.

In the early 19th century textile mills, engineering works and food manufacturers built factories in the city mostly in the Denton Holme, Caldewgate and Wapping suburbs in the Caldew Valley. These included Carr's of Carlisle, Kangol, Metal Box and Cowans Sheldon. Shaddon Mill, in Denton Holme, became famous for having the world's 8th tallest chimney and was the largest cotton mill in England.

The expanding industries brought about an increase in population as jobs shifted from rural farms towards the cities. This produced a housing shortage where at one point 25,000 people in the city only had 5,000 houses to live in. People were said to be herded together with animal houses, slaughter houses and communal lavatories with open drains running between them. Living conditions were so bad that riots were common and some people emigrated. The problem was not solved until the end of the 19th century when mass housing was built west of the city walls.

In 1823, a canal was built to Fisher's Cross (Port Carlisle) to transport goods produced in the city. This enabled other industrial centres such as Liverpool to link with Carlisle via the Solway. This was short-lived and when the canal operators ran into financial difficulty the waterway was filled in. A railway was built in place of the canal.

Carlisle became a major railway centre on the West Coast Main Line with connections to the east. At one time, seven companies used Carlisle Citadel railway station. Before the building of the Citadel railway station, the city had several other railway stations, including London Road railway station. Carlisle had the largest railway marshalling yard in Europe, Kingmoor, which, reduced in size, is operational and used by railfreight companies.

The Strand Road drill hall opened in 1874.

=== Modern history ===
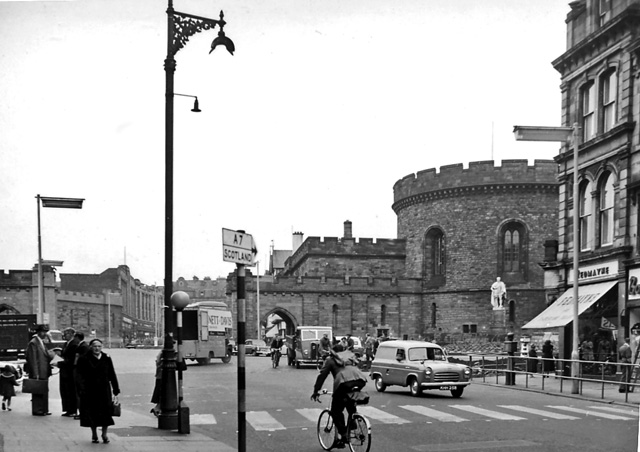
Botchergate in Carlisle, 1957

At the start of the 20th century, the population had grown to over 45,000. Transport was improved by the City of Carlisle Electric Tramways from 1900 until 1931, and the first cinema was built in 1906. In 1912, the boundaries of Carlisle were extended to include Botcherby in the east and Stanwix in the north.

Carlisle was subject to the decline in the textile industry experienced throughout Britain as new machinery made labour unnecessary. In 1916, during the First World War, the government took over the public houses and breweries in Carlisle because of drunkenness among construction and munitions workers from the munitions factory at Gretna. This experiment nationalised brewing. As the Carlisle Board of Control, and subsequently the Carlisle & District State Management Scheme, it lasted until 1971.

During the Second World War, Carlisle hosted over 5,000 evacuees, many of whom arrived from Newcastle upon Tyne and the surrounding towns.

A shopping centre (including a new central library) was built to the east and north-east of the market cross and opened in 1986. The area east of the market cross had formerly been occupied by narrow alleyways of housing and small shops (on a layout which had not changed much since medieval times) and referred to locally as The Lanes. Carlisle city centre was pedestrianised in 1989.

On the evening of Friday, 7 January 2005, the rivers Eden, Caldew and Petteril burst their banks due to as much as 180 mm (7 inches) rainfall upstream that day. 2,700 homes were flooded and three people died. The city's police and fire stations were flooded along with Brunton Park football stadium. The police, fire service and Carlisle United F.C. were mobilised, the latter as far as Morecambe. At the time of the flood, emergency services also had to respond to cases of car-related arson in the city.

== City centre ==
Carlisle is the only city in Cumbria. The city centre is largely pedestrianised and the Lanes shopping centre is home to around 75 shops.

Carlisle has a compact historic centre with a castle, cathedral and semi-intact city walls, as well as other medieval buildings including the Guildhall and Tithe Barn. The Citadel towers, which until 2016 also served as offices for Cumbria County Council, were designed by Thomas Telford, with the eastern tower incorporating part of the 16th-century building. The first citadel building was a Tudor fortification replacing the medieval Englishgate, designed by the Moravian military engineer Stefan von Haschenperg in 1541. Next to the Citadel is Carlisle railway station, designed by William Tite in the neo-Tudor style, considered by Historic England to be among the most important early railway stations in England.

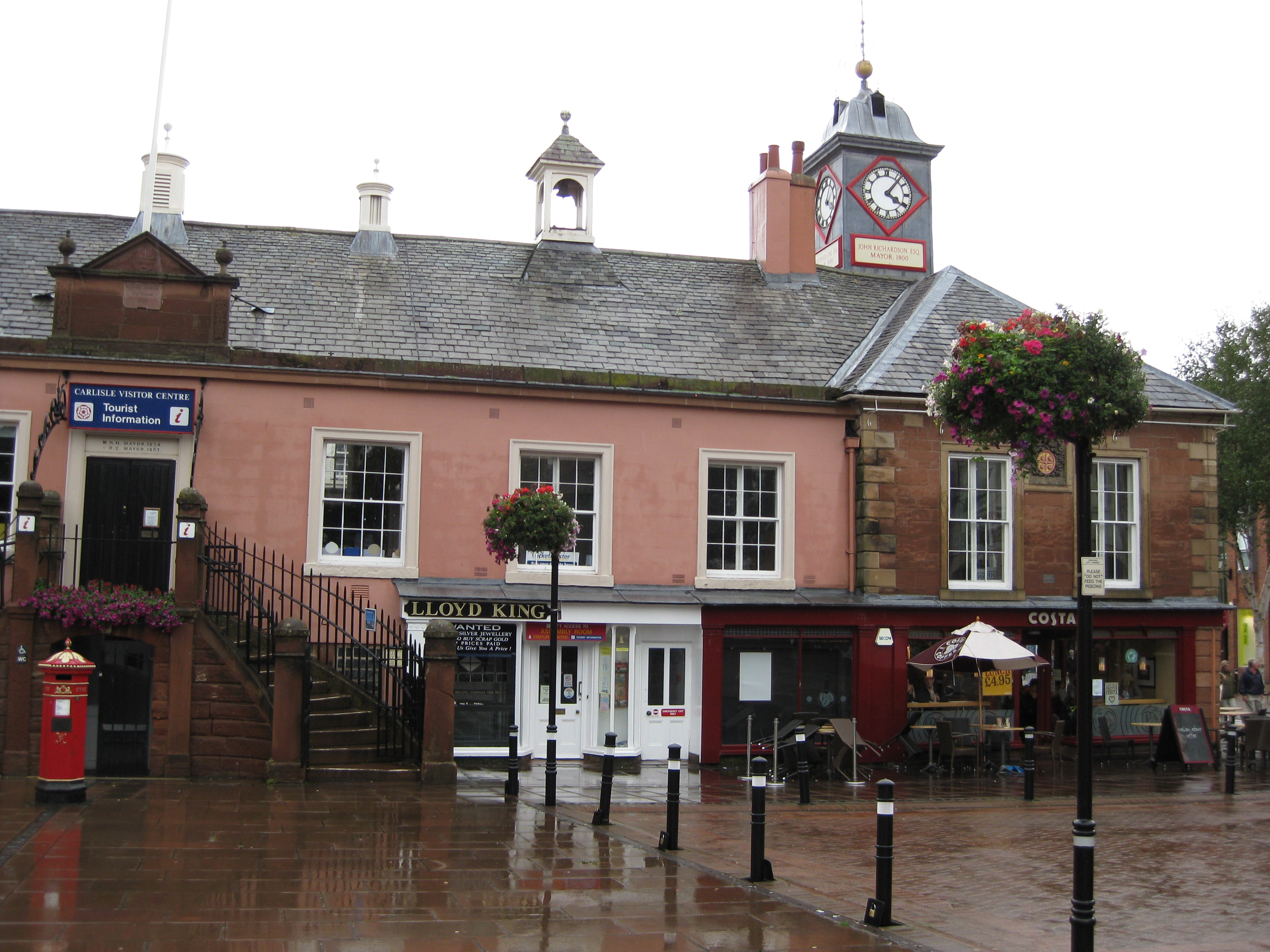
Old Town Hall 1668–69 with 1717 extension

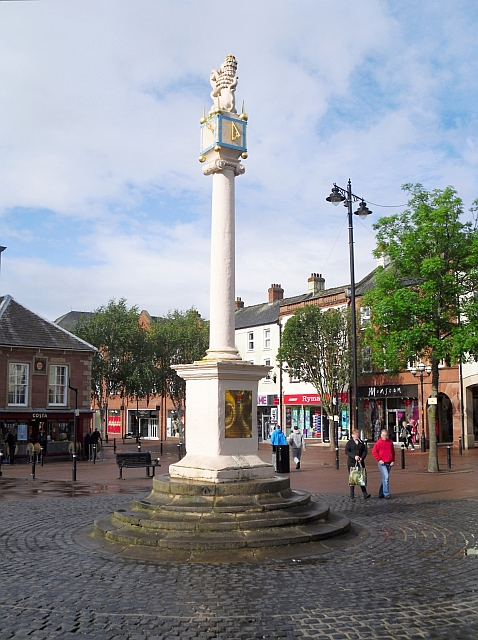
Carlisle Market Cross, 1682

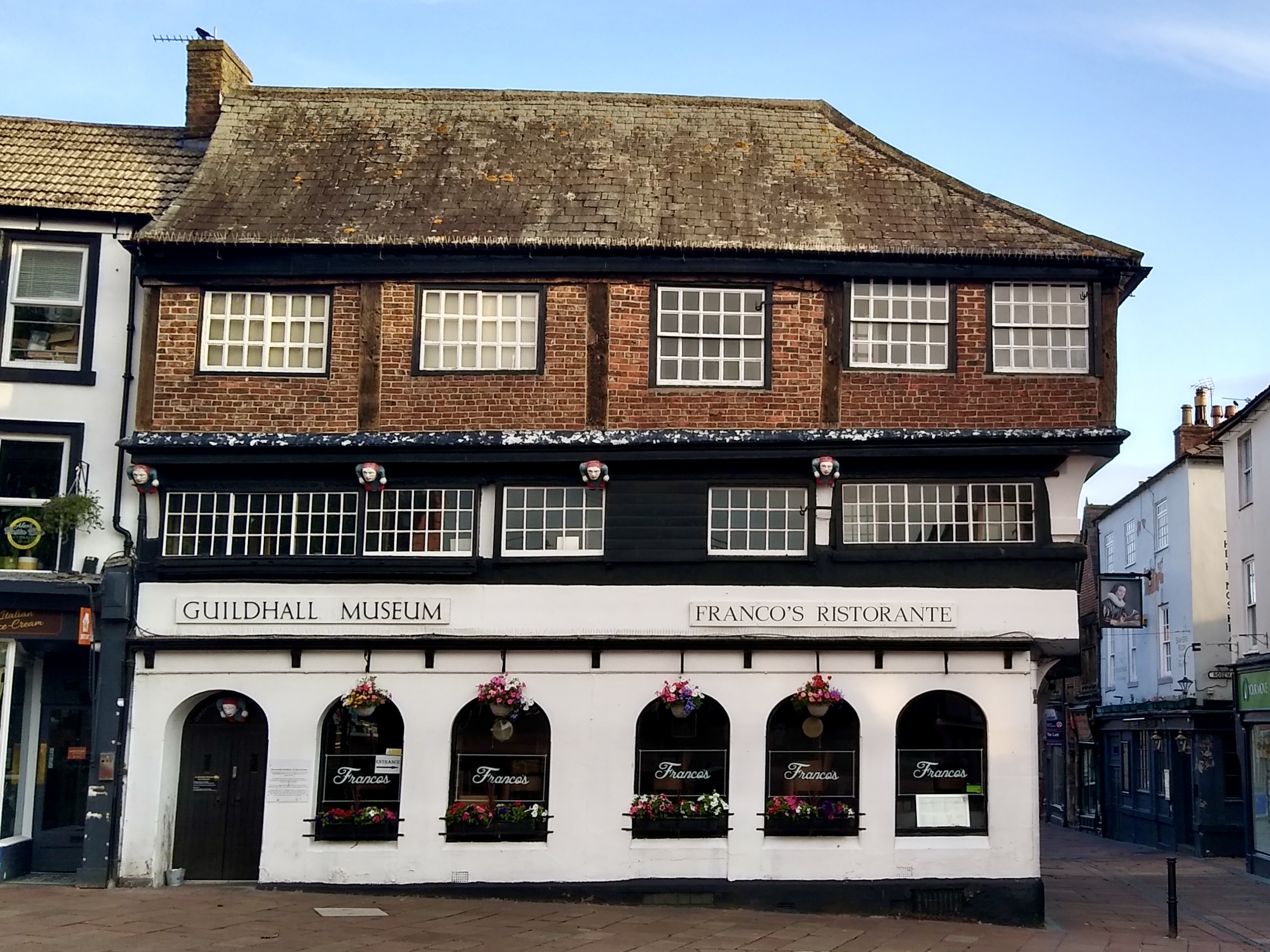
Guildhall Museum, 1407

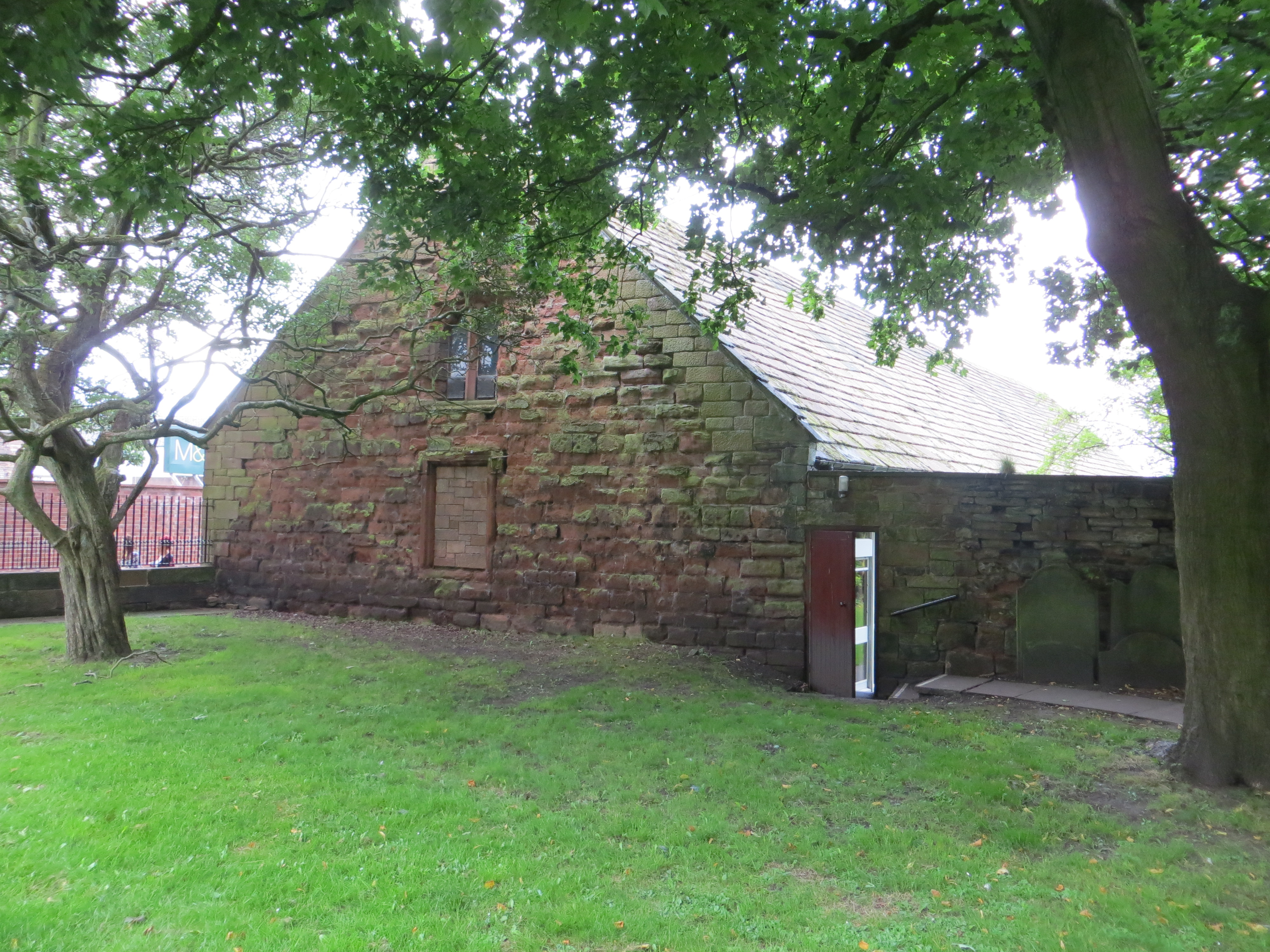
The Tithe Barn, 1470s

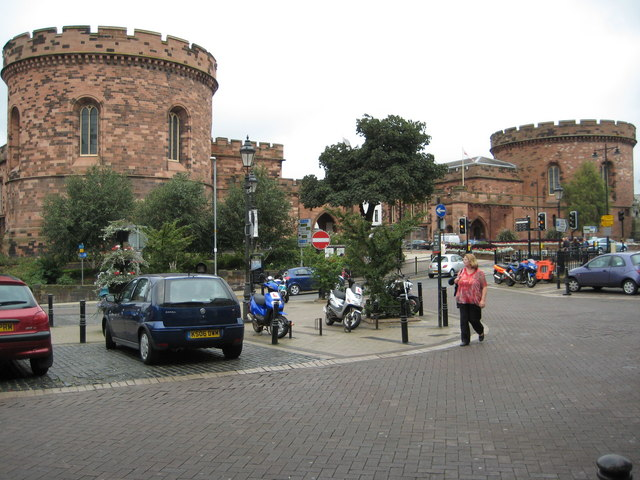
The Citadel, 1810

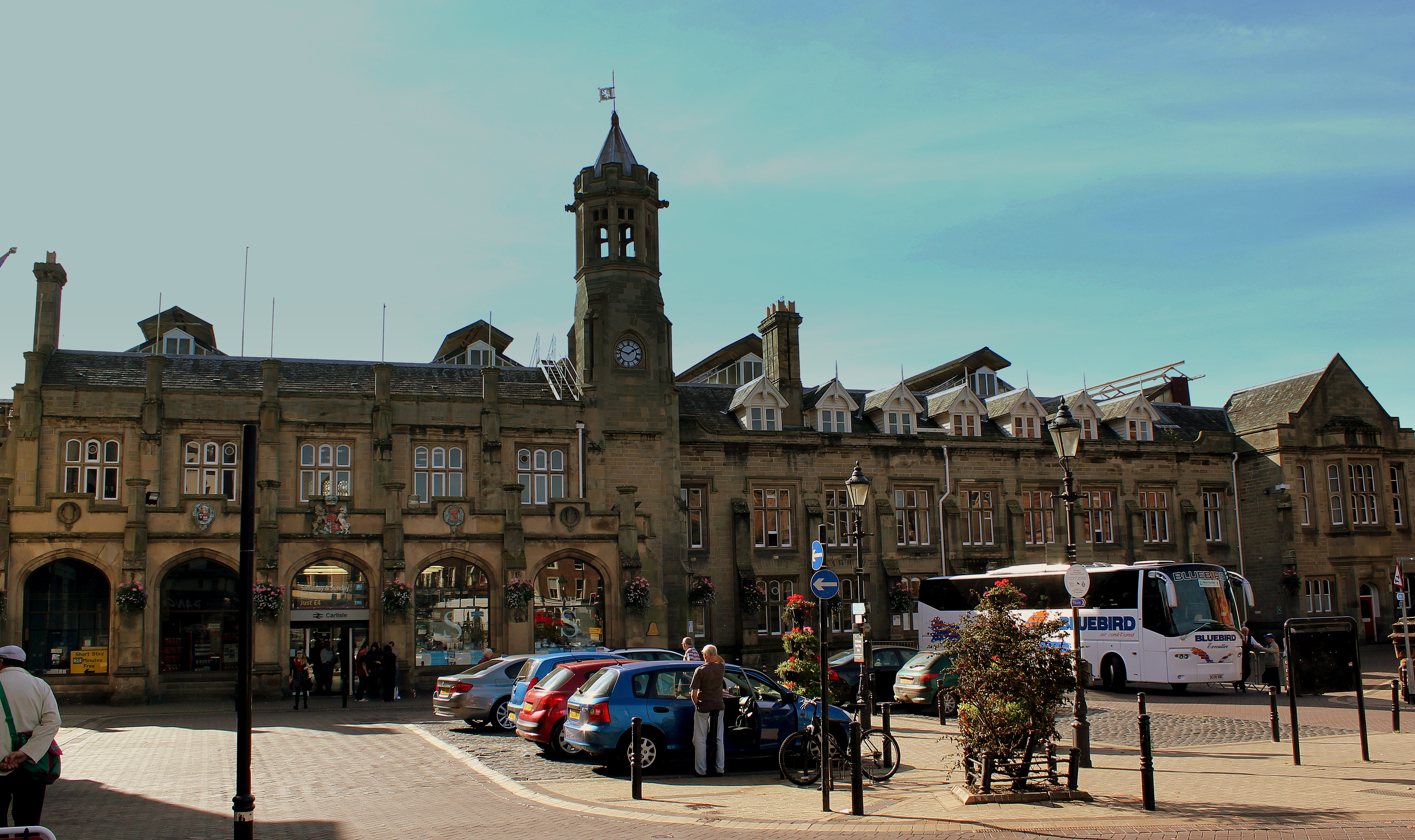
Carlisle Station frontage

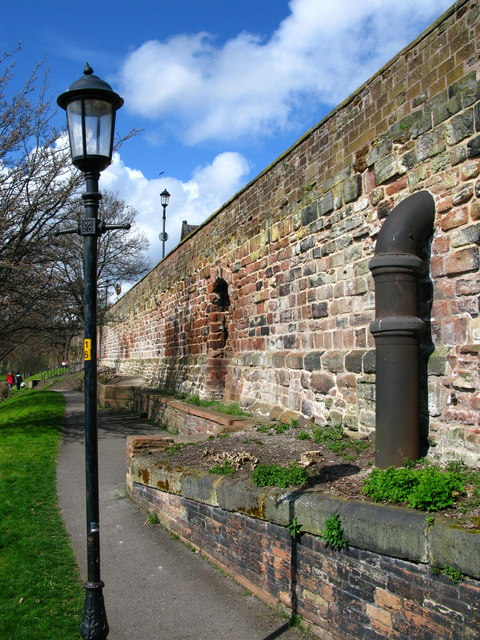
West City Walls

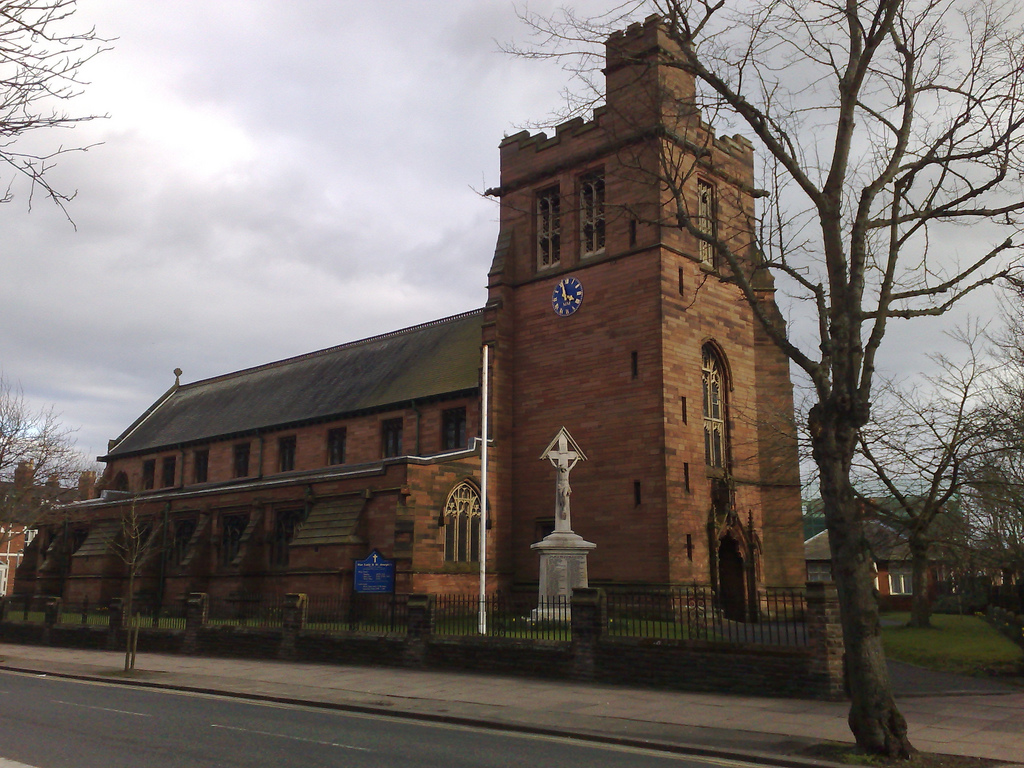
Our Lady and St Joseph's Church, Carlisle

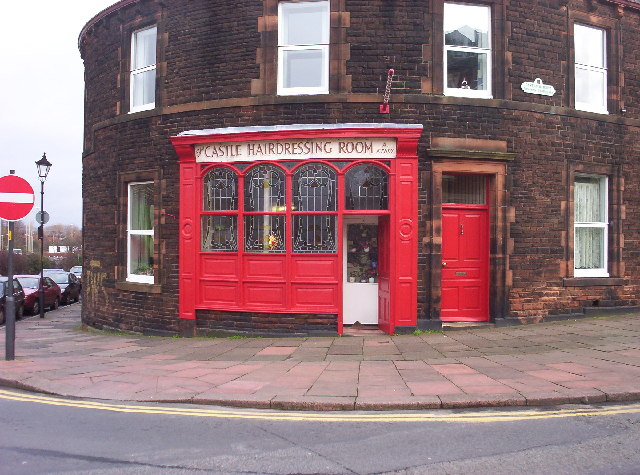
Traditional Barber Shop

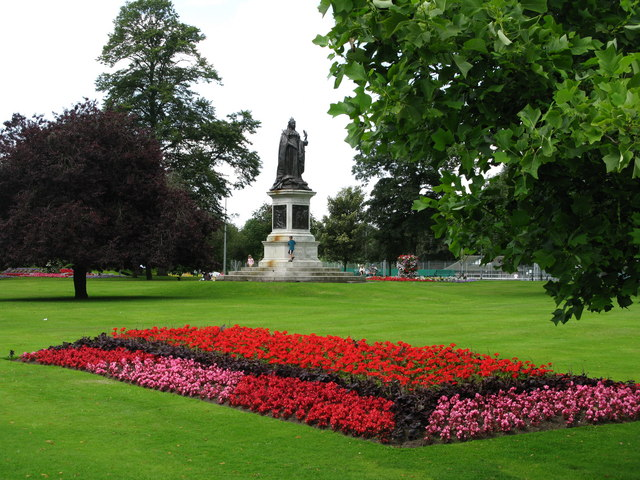
Bitts Park

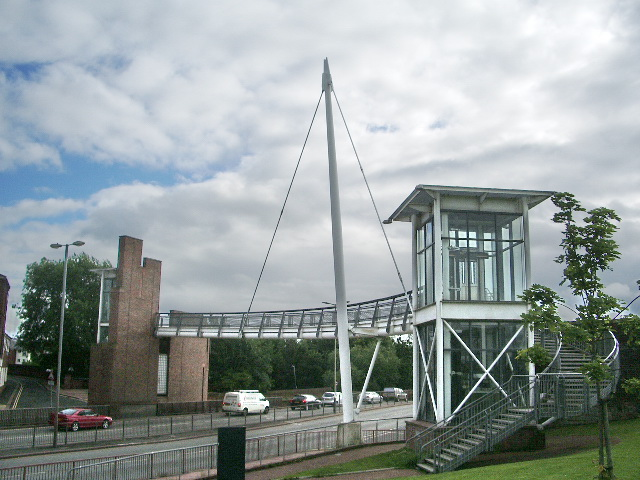
Millennium Bridge

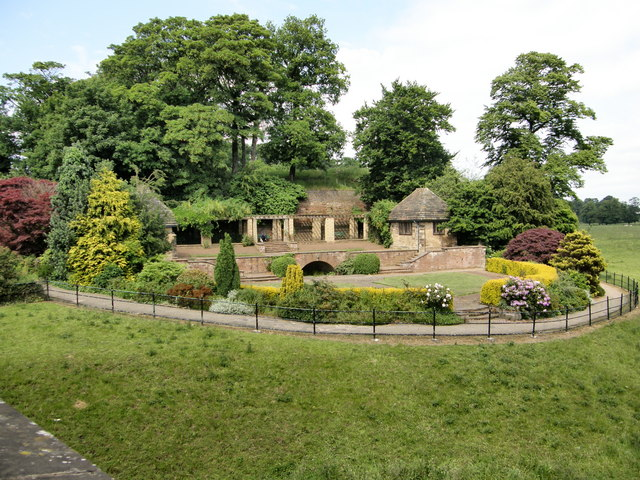
Chinese Gardens

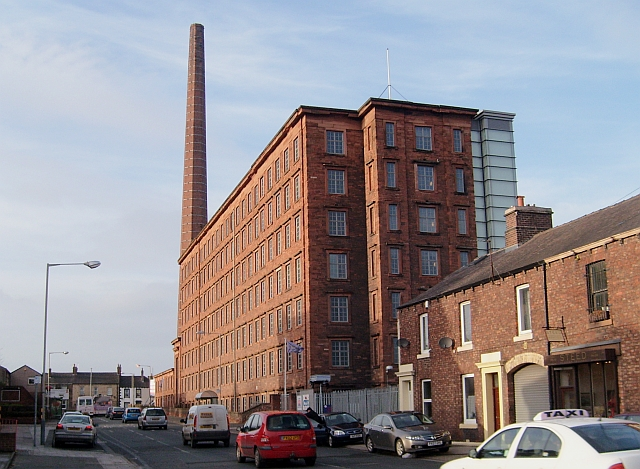
Dixon's Chimney and Shaddon Mill

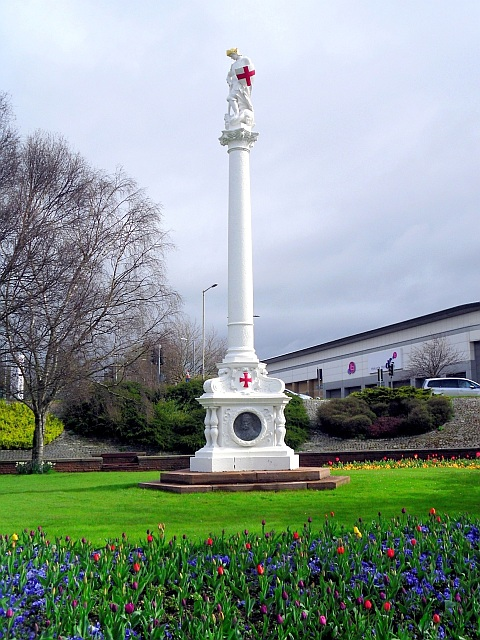
Creighton Memorial

== Governance ==
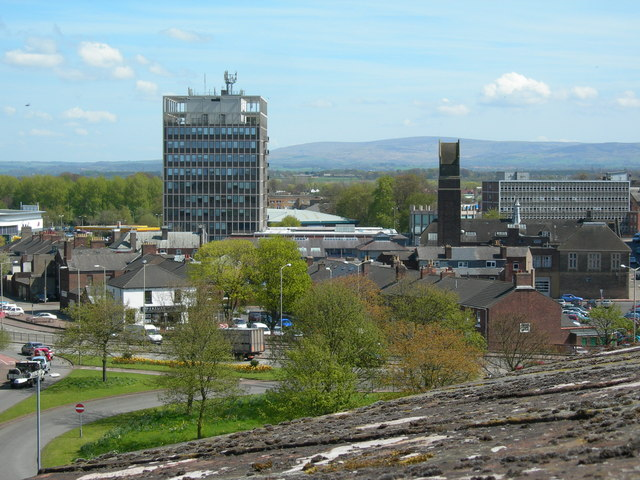
Carlisle Civic Centre in the city centre

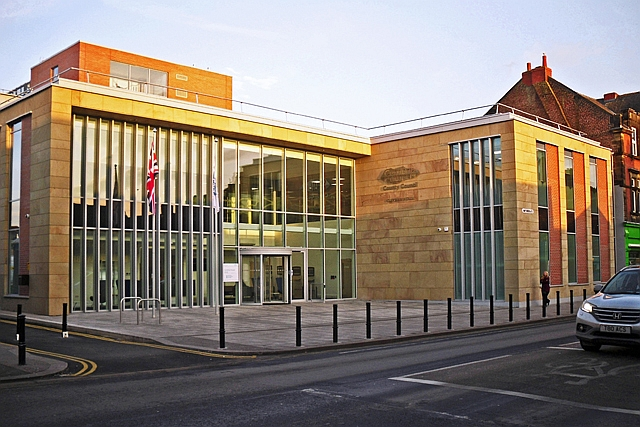
Cumbria House

There is one main tier of local government covering Carlisle, at unitary authority level: Cumberland Council. The council is based in Carlisle, with its offices including Carlisle Civic Centre and Cumbria House. Some peripheral parts of the Carlisle built up area are covered by civil parishes, but the main part of the built up area is unparished.

The Carlisle constituency covers the built up area plus rural areas to the north-east, extending up to the Scottish border. It is represented by Julie Minns of the Labour Party.

=== Charter trustees ===
Carlisle charter trustees area defined in 2023

The Cumberland councillors who represent the wards covering the built up area act as charter trustees to preserve Carlisle's charters and city status; they choose one of their number each year to serve as Mayor of Carlisle.

There are twelve trustees, appointed from the councillors that cover the City of Carlisle. From 1 April 2023 the "City of Carlisle" was defined as covering the following former Carlisle City Council wards (as those wards existed on 31 March 2023): Belah and Kingmoor, Botcherby and Harraby North, Cathedral and Castle, Currock and Upperby, Denton Holme and Morton South, Harraby South and Parklands, Newtown and Morton North, Sandsfield and Morton West and Stanwix and Houghton. The charter trustees act as appropriate bodies in which the historic rights and privileges of Carlisle, including the mayoralty, will continue subject to future governance reviews. These rights could be transferred to the unparished area of Carlisle (i.e. the former area of the County Borough of Carlisle) if a parish council were formed.

=== Administrative history ===
Carlisle was an ancient borough. Its date of becoming a borough is unknown; its earliest recorded municipal charter was issued by Henry II (reigned 1154–1189), but the borough clearly existed prior to that. In accordance with the custom of the time, the borough of Carlisle also became a city on becoming the seat of the Diocese of Carlisle in 1133.

The ancient borough covered approximately the area within the Carlisle city walls. The borough was defined as the township of English Street in the parish of Carlisle St Cuthbert, the four townships of Abbey Street, Castle Street, Fisher Street, and Scotch Street in the parish of Carlisle St Mary (which used part of Carlisle Cathedral as its parish church), and an extra-parochial area known as Eaglesfield Abbey, which covered the cathedral grounds. Both St Cuthbert's and St Mary's parishes also included extensive rural areas outside the borough boundaries.

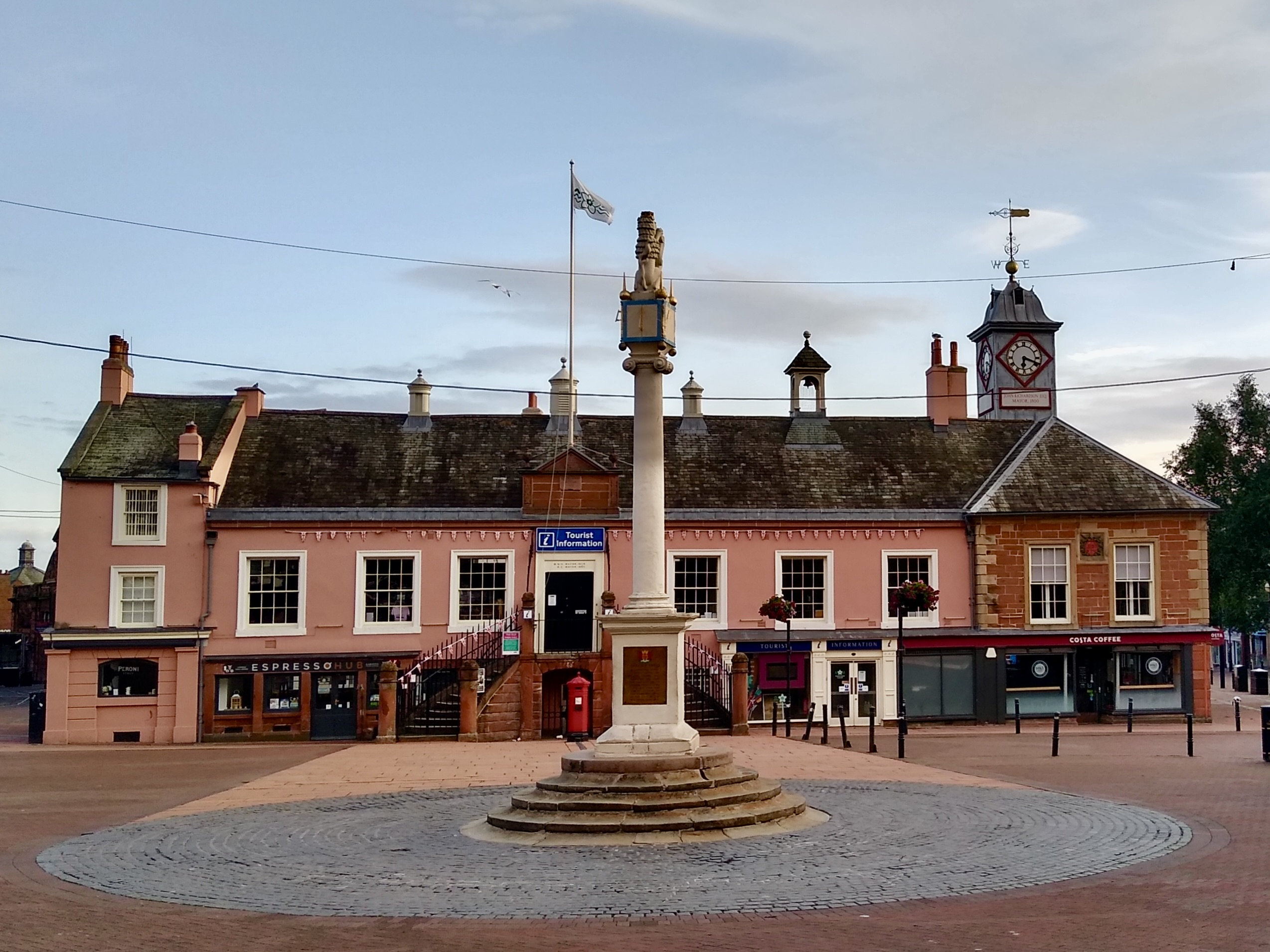
Old Town Hall

The borough council (also known as the corporation) built the Town Hall in the Market Place in 1668–1669 to serve both as its meeting place and a courthouse, replacing a medieval town hall on the same site.

From 1295, the borough also served as a parliamentary borough (constituency). The constituency was enlarged in 1832 to take in Botchergate from St Cuthbert's parish, and Rickergate and part of Caldewgate from St Mary's parish. In 1836, the borough was reformed to become a municipal borough under the Municipal Corporations Act 1835, which standardised how most boroughs operated across the country. As part of those reforms, the municipal boundaries were adjusted to match the constituency.

In 1904, the parishes within the borough were united into a single civil parish of Carlisle which matched the borough. The borough was enlarged in 1912 to take in parts of several neighbouring parishes, notably including Stanwix. As thus enlarged, Carlisle was considered large enough for the borough council to take over county-level functions from Cumberland County Council, and so in 1914 Carlisle was made a county borough. The borough was further enlarged in 1951. The borough council moved its headquarters to the new Civic Centre on Rickergate in 1964.

The municipal borough and civil parish of Carlisle were abolished in 1974 under the Local Government Act 1972. The area merged with Border Rural District to become a non-metropolitan district called Carlisle in the new county of Cumbria. Carlisle's borough and city statuses were transferred to the new district, and so the district council took the name Carlisle City Council.

The non-metropolitan district of Carlisle was in turn abolished in 2023 when the new Cumberland Council was created, also taking over the functions of the abolished Cumbria County Council in the area.

== Geography ==
Carlisle unparished area

Carlisle is situated on a slight rise, in the Cumberland Ward, at the confluence of the rivers Eden, Caldew and Petteril.

An important centre for trade, it is located 56 mi (90 km) west of Newcastle upon Tyne, 71 mi (114 km) north of Lancaster, 90 mi (140 km) south-east of Glasgow, 93 mi (150 km) south of Edinburgh, 120 mi (190 km) north-west of York, and 300 mi (480 km) north-north-west of London. Nearby towns and villages include Longtown (north), Penrith (south), Brampton (east), Wigton (west), Haggbeck, Harker, Carwinley, Blackford, Houghton, Scotby, Wreay and Rockcliffe.

=== Weather and climate ===
Carlisle experiences an oceanic climate (Köppen climate classification Cfb).

Climate data for Carlisle (Note: Weather station is located 3 mi (4.8 km) from the Carlisle city centre.) WMO ID: 03220; coordinates 54°56′04″N 2°57′49″W; elevation: 28 m (92 ft), 1991–2020 normals
Month	Jan	Feb	Mar	Apr	May	Jun	Jul	Aug	Sep	Oct	Nov	Dec	Year
Record high °C (°F)	14.7 (58.5)	16.0 (60.8)	19.7 (67.5)	25.2 (77.4)	28.1 (82.6)	30.4 (86.7)	34.5 (94.1)	33.2 (91.8)	29.5 (85.1)	23.5 (74.3)	18.2 (64.8)	15.3 (59.5)	34.5 (94.1)
Mean daily maximum °C (°F)	7.2 (45.0)	7.8 (46.0)	9.7 (49.5)	12.5 (54.5)	15.6 (60.1)	18.1 (64.6)	19.8 (67.6)	19.3 (66.7)	17.2 (63.0)	13.6 (56.5)	10.0 (50.0)	7.4 (45.3)	13.2 (55.8)
Daily mean °C (°F)	4.6 (40.3)	4.9 (40.8)	6.4 (43.5)	8.6 (47.5)	11.1 (52.0)	14.1 (57.4)	15.9 (60.6)	15.6 (60.1)	13.5 (56.3)	10.3 (50.5)	7.1 (44.8)	4.6 (40.3)	9.7 (49.5)
Mean daily minimum °C (°F)	1.9 (35.4)	1.9 (35.4)	3.0 (37.4)	4.7 (40.5)	7.1 (44.8)	10.0 (50.0)	11.9 (53.4)	11.7 (53.1)	9.8 (49.6)	7.0 (44.6)	4.1 (39.4)	1.8 (35.2)	6.3 (43.3)
Record low °C (°F)	−13.5 (7.7)	−14.9 (5.2)	−10.7 (12.7)	−4.8 (23.4)	−1.6 (29.1)	1.7 (35.1)	3.4 (38.1)	2.9 (37.2)	0.6 (33.1)	−4.1 (24.6)	−9.2 (15.4)	−14.7 (5.5)	−14.9 (5.2)
Average precipitation mm (inches)	81.3 (3.20)	69.4 (2.73)	62.3 (2.45)	49.2 (1.94)	57.4 (2.26)	70.5 (2.78)	80.6 (3.17)	89.0 (3.50)	77.8 (3.06)	97.9 (3.85)	85.3 (3.36)	98.1 (3.86)	918.8 (36.17)
Average precipitation days (≥ 1.0 mm)	14.1	11.6	11.7	11.0	10.7	11.5	12.8	12.9	12.0	14.5	14.7	15.2	152.6
Mean monthly sunshine hours	53.6	74.8	108.5	156.9	197.5	181.0	165.6	163.2	126.9	90.3	59.3	43.4	1,420.9
Source 1: Met Office Infoclimat
Source 2: WeatherAtlas

==== Flooding ====
In January 2005, Carlisle was hit by strong gales and heavy rain, and on Saturday 8 January 2005 all roads into Carlisle were closed owing to severe flooding, the worst since 1822, which caused three deaths.

Even worse flooding than in 2005 affected Carlisle between 4 and 6 December 2015. During this time, nearly 36 hours of incessant rainfall breached flood defences and left several areas submerged – including Bitts Park, Hardwicke Circus and Warwick Road. This left the Sands Centre (and the nearby Shell petrol station and Bitts Park), marooned from the rest of the city. As several other areas of Cumbria were also badly affected (particularly Appleby and Wigton), all trains to Scotland were postponed indefinitely, with trains on the West Coast Mainline going no further than Preston, as nearby Lancaster suffered flooding and problems with electricity supply. Prime Minister David Cameron visited the city on 7 December 2015 to assess the damage, having earlier called an emergency Cobra meeting.

=== Divisions and suburbs ===
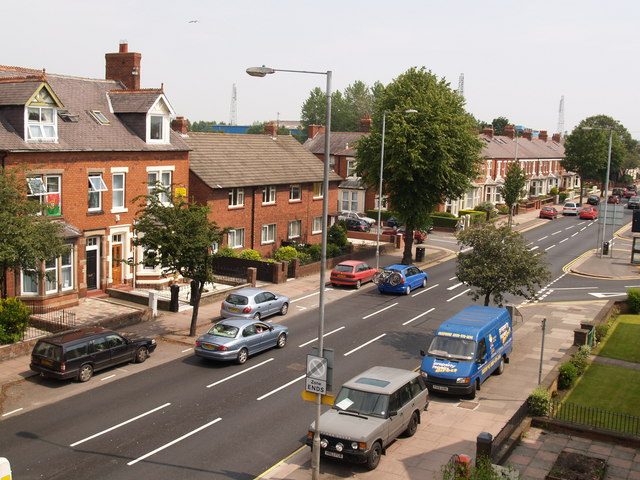
Warwick Road serves as one of the main routes into the centre of Carlisle.

In the north of Carlisle are the suburbs of Kingstown, Lowry Hill and Moorville, formerly part of the parish of Kingmoor. To the south of them are Stanwix, Edentown, Etterby, St Ann's Hill and Belah which were added to Carlisle in 1912. The parish of Stanwix Rural exists but only includes a small part of Carlisle's urban area, Whiteclosegate.

To the immediate south of Stanwix is the River Eden. On the opposite bank is the city centre bounded on the west by the West Coast Main Railway line and the River Caldew. In the past industry flourished on the banks of the River Caldew, especially Denton Holme and Caldewgate on the west bank and Wapping, around the former Metal Box works, on the east. West of Caldewgate and north of Denton Holme the suburbs of Newtown, Morton, Sandsfield Park, Longsowerby, Raffles and Belle Vue developed in the late 19th and 20th centuries.

The eastern side of the city centre developed in the 19th century into a more affluent area along the main A69 road. It links with the former village of Botcherby to which a large council estate was added in the mid-20th century and later still Durranhill Housing Estate.

South of the city centre is the Botchergate/St Nicholas area of late Victorian terraced housing similar to that found in Denton Holme and Caldewgate. The Botchergate East area until recently had older slum dwellings.

To the south west of Botchergate and St Nicholas are the former villages now suburbs of Upperby and Currock. The urban area spills over the former county borough boundary into Blackwell and Durdar in the civil parish of St Cuthbert Without.

Between Upperby and Botcherby is Harraby, a former village once part of St Cuthbert Without and the largest suburb of Carlisle. Harraby is subdivided into Harraby East, New Harraby, Harraby Green, Old Harraby, Petteril Bank and the Durranhill Industrial Estate. Adjoining Harraby to the south but outside the former borough boundary is the hamlet of Carleton.

== Transport ==
=== Road ===
Carlisle is linked to the rest of England via the M6 motorway to the south, and to Scotland via the A74(M)/M74 towards Glasgow and the north. Many trunk roads begin or terminate in Carlisle, including the A6 to Penrith and Luton (historically the main road to the south prior to the opening of the M6), the A595 to western Cumbria, the A69 to Newcastle upon Tyne and the A7 to Edinburgh.

=== Rail ===
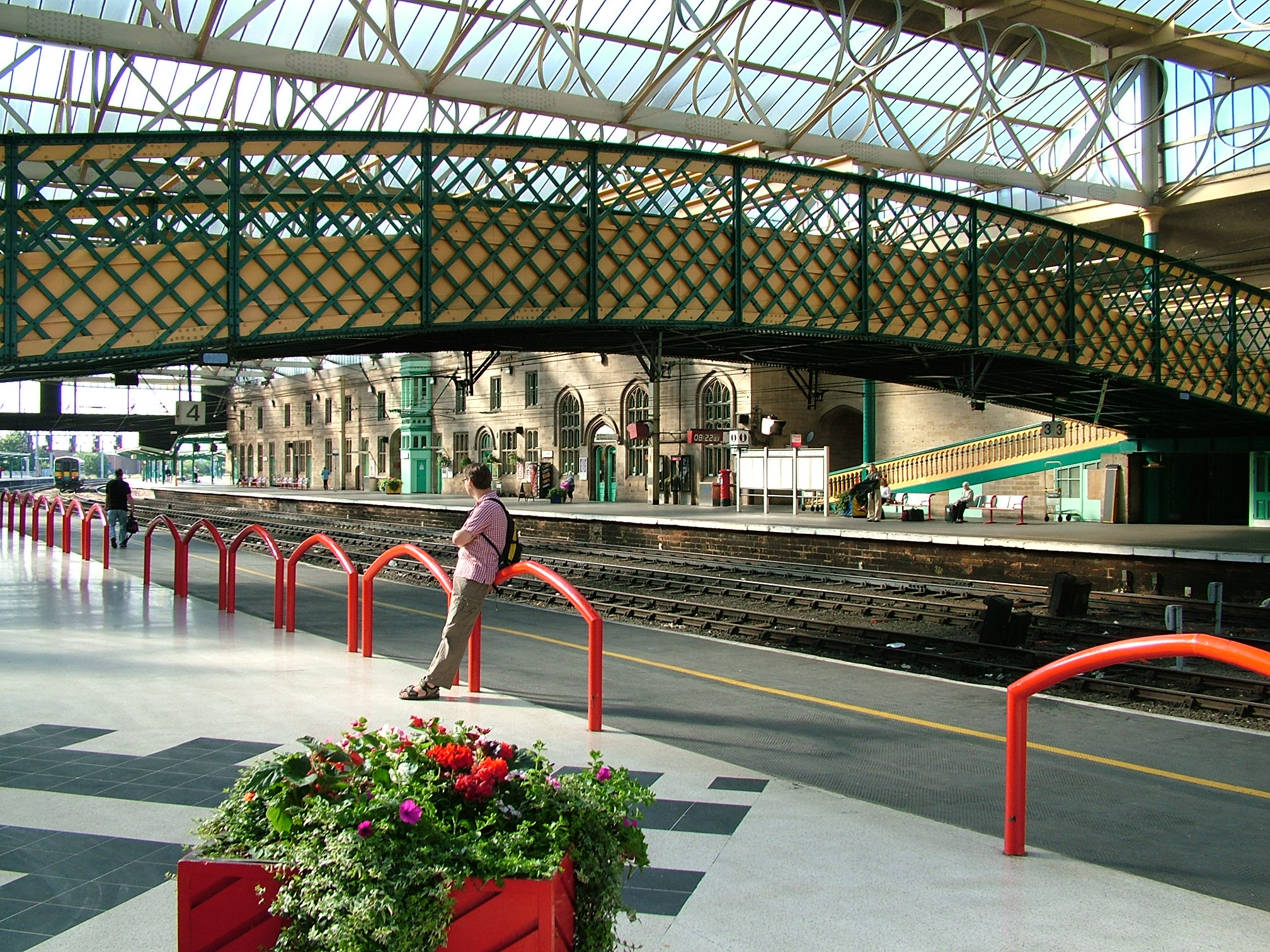
Carlisle railway station

Carlisle became a major railway centre with, at one time, seven different companies using Carlisle Citadel railway station. Prior to the building of the Citadel railway station, Carlisle had several railway stations, including London Road railway station. Carlisle also used to have the largest railway marshalling yard in Europe, Kingmoor Marshalling Yard, which, although reduced in size, is still operational and used by railfreight companies such as Colas Rail, DB Cargo UK, Freightliner and occasionally Direct Rail Services.

Today, Carlisle railway station is a principal station on the West Coast Main Line. Other lines branch off to Newcastle, along the Tyne Valley line; Leeds, along the Settle and Carlisle line; Glasgow Central, via Dumfries along the Glasgow South Western Line which connects Ayr and Stranraer for the Stena Line ferry to Port of Belfast or P&O Ferries to Larne Harbour; and west Cumbria along the Cumbrian Coast Line to Whitehaven, Barrow-in-Furness and Lancaster. Services are operated by ScotRail, Avanti West Coast, Northern and TransPennine Express. Kingmoor Traction Maintenance Depot is a major facility north of Carlisle, operated by Direct Rail Services.

=== Bus services ===
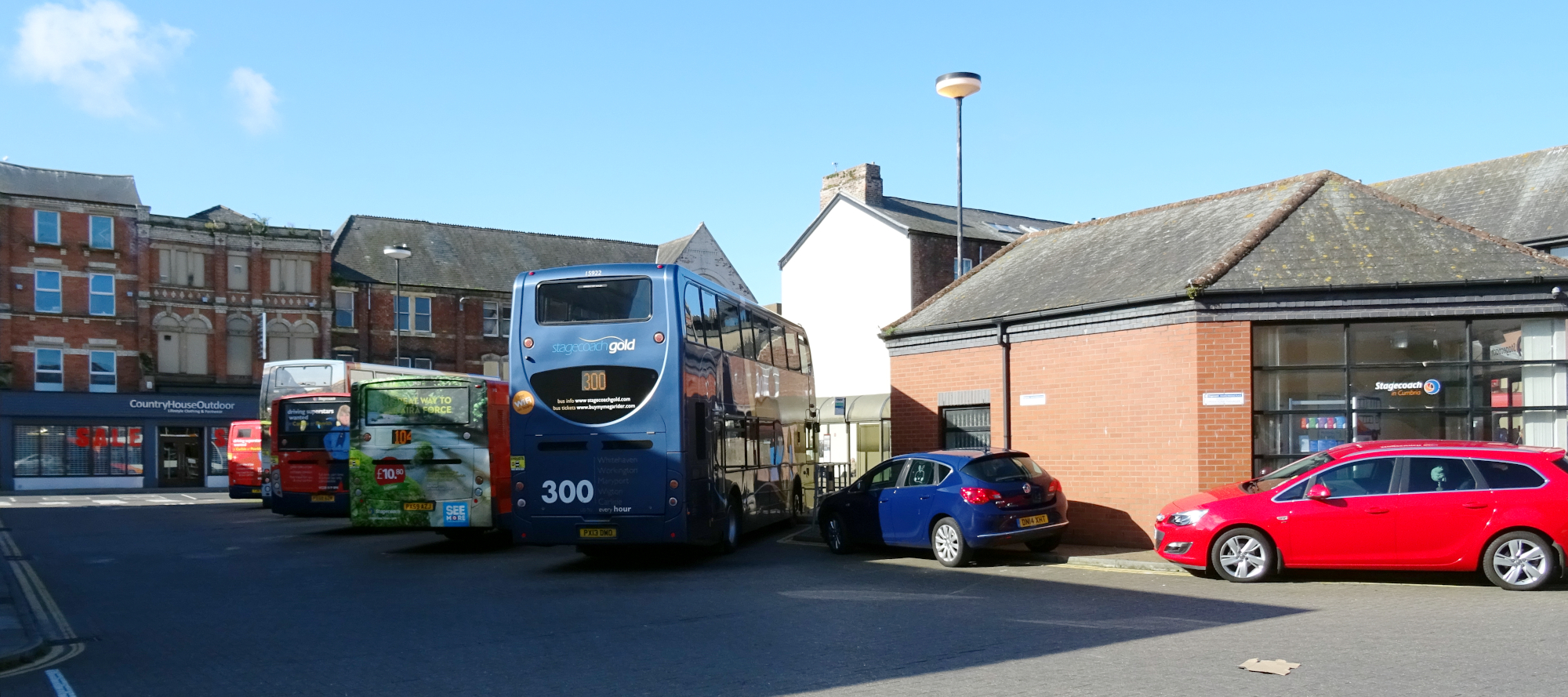
Carlisle Bus Station

Most local bus services in the city are operated by Stagecoach Cumbria & North Lancashire. Previously, local independent operator, Reays Coaches, operated a number of local routes, many of which were in competition with Stagecoach.

The bus station is situated on Drury Lane, off Lonsdale Street. It has seven stands, each of which are covered by a waiting shelter, as well as a travel centre.

The present station was built in the 1990s to replace a larger station that was partially on the same site and had access from Lowther Street, where the Earls Lane shopping area is now. It is owned and managed by Stagecoach Cumbria and North Lancashire. The main operators at the bus station are Stagecoach North East, Borders Buses, National Express and Stagecoach Cumbria and North Lancashire.

=== Air ===
Carlisle Lake District Airport is a small regional airport located 5.8 mi (9.3 km) east north-east of the city. The nearest major airport is Newcastle International Airport, near the east coast, which is around 55 mi (89 km) away from Carlisle.

== Trade and industry ==
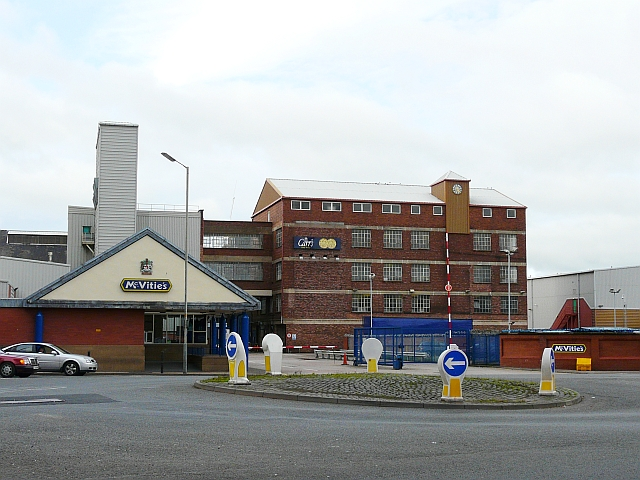
McVities factory, Caldewgate

Carlisle became an industrial city in the 19th and early 20th centuries with many textile mills, engineering works and food manufacturers opening up mostly in the Denton Holme, Caldewgate and Wapping areas which lie in the Caldew Valley area of Carlisle. (One such manufacturer located in the Denton Holme area was Ferguson Printers, a large textile printing factory that had stood for many years before its closure in the early 1990s). In the early 19th century, a canal was dug connecting Caldewgate with the sea at Port Carlisle. The canal was later filled in and became a railway line.

Carlisle was served by two electricity power stations. James Street station was built by the corporation and operated from 1899 until 1927. Willow Holme power station, north west of the city, was built and operated by the corporation from 1923 until nationalisation of the industry in 1948. It was closed down in 1980 and demolished in 1988.

Famous firms that were founded or had factories in Carlisle included Carr's of Carlisle (now part of United Biscuits), Kangol, Metal Box (now part of Crown Holdings) and Cowans Sheldon. Cowans Sheldon originated in the city in the mid 19th century and became one of the world's most important railway and marine engineering firms, manufacturing finally ceased in Carlisle in 1987. Others include the construction firms of John Laing and Story Contracting. Pirelli opened its plant in Carlisle in 1969.

The hauliers Eddie Stobart Logistics who were founded in nearby Hesket Newmarket and were once part of the Stobart Group, had their HQ in Carlisle. Although they no longer have their HQ in Carlisle they still employ staff in the city. Robsons Border Transport Limited, J & W Watt Limited and F Brown (Carlisle) Limited, all substantial road hauliers, had their HQ in Carlisle.

Until 2004, Carlisle's biggest employer was Cavaghan & Gray, which became part of Northern Foods and was subsequently acquired by 2 Sisters Food Group which operated from two sites in the Harraby area of Carlisle producing chilled foods for major supermarket chains. The London Road site closed in 2005 with the loss of almost 700 jobs as production was transferred to the nearby Eastern Way site or other factories around the UK.

There are various light industrial estates and business parks located on the fringes of Carlisle and on former industrial sites close to the city centre. The largest is the Kingstown Industrial Estate, located just off the A7 road near to the M6 motorway.

On 28 March 2005, Carlisle was granted Fairtrade City status.

== Education ==
The University of Cumbria has four campuses in Carlisle on Fusehill Street, Brampton Road, Paternoster Row and Newcastle Street. The university provides a wide range of degree courses in higher education such as information technology, applied psychology, art, business, law, media, social work and teacher education.

Carlisle College is the further education establishment based in the city.

The secondary schools within Carlisle are: Richard Rose Central Academy, Richard Rose Morton Academy, Austin Friars St Monicas (Roman Catholic Private School), Trinity School and St John Henry Newman Catholic School.

Richard Rose Central Academy replaced St Aidan's County High School and Specialist sports and science college, and North Cumbria Technology College (NCTC, formerly Harraby School). It is sponsored by Eddie Stobart owner Andrew Tinkler, and local businessman Brian Scowcroft. It opened in September 2008. In January 2009, there were protests by parents and pupils regarding poor quality education and school facilities. The school was found to be failing and was placed in Special Measures, with the headmaster and chief executive being immediately replaced.

== Culture ==
Carlisle is twinned with Flensburg in Schleswig-Holstein, Germany, and Słupsk in Pomeranian Voivodeship, Poland.

=== Art and history ===
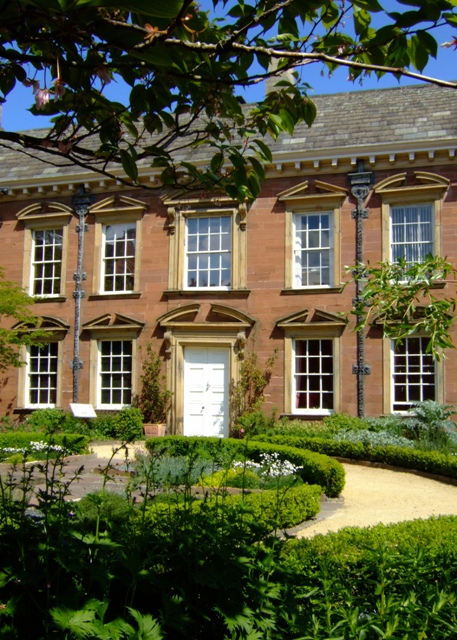
Tullie House Gardens

The Tullie House Museum and Art Gallery was opened in 1893 by the Carlisle Corporation. The museum features resident exhibits detailing the history of Roman occupancy of the region, Hadrian's Wall and the Border Reivers. Tullie House, named after the Jacobean mansion in which it is located, hosts travelling exhibitions. The museum has received many awards and was expanded in 1990 and 2000.

The city's Guildhall Museum is based in a 14th-century house, and the Border Regiment Military Museum is in the castle.

=== Music and theatre ===
Sands Centre Sports Hall is Carlisle's main entertainment venue which sometimes hosts touring musicians, theatre and comedians. The West Walls Theatre is situated in the city centre, an amateur theatre. The Old Fire Station opened in 2015 after being converted into a performing arts venue. It hosts touring bands, live stand-up comedy, dramas and art exhibitions. Brunton Park stadium has hosted live music including an Elton John concert in 2007.

Carlisle Music Festival takes place in Carlisle Cathedral each year. The defunct Brampton Live, the largest folk festival in the north of England, formerly took place in Brampton. Over the weekend of 14/15 May 2011, Carlisle Lake District Airport hosted Europe's largest free music festival, Radio 1's Big Weekend. The festival's headline acts included Lady Gaga and the Foo Fighters. St Cuthbert's Church hosts an annual series of instrumental and chamber music concerts organised by North Cumbria Recitals.

Her Majesty's Theatre, in Lowther Street, was constructed in 1874 as the Victoria Hall, and started screening films in 1897. An early music director at the turn of the century was Howard Ellis Carr. After the interior was damaged by fire in 1904, it was rebuilt to designs by architects Beadle & Hope, and reopened in 1905 as Her Majesty's Theatre. Films and variety shows were staged, until around 1919, when it staged only live productions and plays. Robert David MacDonald was artistic director at the theatre. After being briefly renamed Municipal Theatre in the 1960s, the theatre closed in early 1963 and reopened as the Regal Bingo Club in late 1963. This closed in the 1970s and the building was demolished in 1980, replaced by a car park.

=== Food ===
Every August the Carlisle Food Fair is held in the pedestrianised area of the city centre. It plays host to produce from across the continent and features local produce including Cumberland sausage, Cumberland sauce, Farmhouse Cheese and Cumberland Mustard.

In 2012, Fair Food Carlisle was awarded the runner-up prize in the government's Buy Better Together Challenge competition. The Buy Better Together Challenge was launched by the Department for Business, Innovation and Skills and Co-operatives UK in December 2011 to encourage groups of consumers to work together to negotiate discounted rates for buying goods and services in bulk. The challenge received 110 entries and to seven finalists were selected. The Fair Food Carlisle scheme uses buying groups to provide workplaces with a weekly supply of food from local businesses.

=== Media ===
From 1961 to 2009, Carlisle was home to Border Television which served Cumbria, southern Scotland, the Isle of Man and parts of Northumberland. Initially based at studios in the Harraby area of the city, the station was controversially merged with ITV Tyne Tees in 2009 as part of wide-ranging cutbacks to ITV's regional output. As of 2014, ITV Border was again producing a full regional news service, along with two hours a week of current affairs and features programming, aimed specifically at southern Scotland.

On BBC One, the city is served by the regional programme, BBC Look North.

Television signals are received from the Caldbeck TV transmitter.

The Cumberland News is the local broadsheet paper published on Fridays. The News and Star is the evening paper. Both are published by Carlisle-based CN Group. Carlisle is home to BBC Radio Cumbria, Greatest Hits Radio Cumbria & South West Scotland and Hospital Radio Echo, which was established in 1965 and is the hospital radio station to Cumberland Infirmary, 24 hours a day. CRFM is Carlisle's community based station which also broadcasts online.

== Sport ==
=== Football ===
==== Association ====
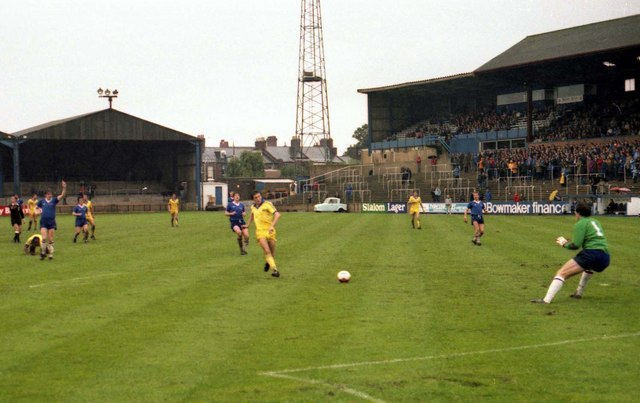
Brunton Park, the home of Carlisle United F.C.

Carlisle is represented in English football by Carlisle United, who currently play in the fifth tier of English football after being relegated from Football League Two in 2025. The club has played at Brunton Park on Warwick Road (A69) since 1909. In November 2011, plans were unveiled for the club to move to a 12,000-seat stadium in Kingmoor Park.

The club's first Football League tenure began in 1928 when it was elected to the northern section of the Football League Third Division, replacing Durham City. Its past achievements include reaching the Football League Cup semi-finals (its best run in either of the two domestic cups) in 1969, and winning promotion to the top flight (then the Football League First Division) in 1974. The club topped the English league after winning its first three games of the 1974-75 season but failed to keep up its good form and was relegated after just one season. In 1987, the club returned to the Football League Fourth Division, and in 2004 was relegated to the Football Conference – the first former top division club to do so – only to regain their Football League place after one year. In 1999, Carlisle United escaped relegation from the Football League on the final day of the season when on-loan goalkeeper Jimmy Glass scored an injury time winner against Plymouth Argyle. The 2–1 win meant that Scarborough were relegated to the Football Conference.

Though Carlisle United has rarely attracted the national football headlines, the club has fielded high-profile players. Some have achieved fame at bigger clubs after spending their early careers at the club. These include Peter Beardsley, Stan Bowles, Steve Harkness, Matt Jansen and Rory Delap. Many older players spent their later years at Carlisle United after playing for bigger clubs. These include Michael Bridges, Mervyn Day, Kevin Gray and David McCreery. Former managers include Bill Shankly, Alan Ashman, Bob Stokoe, Harry Gregg, Mick Wadsworth, Nigel Pearson and Paul Simpson. Since Workington was voted out of the Football League in 1977, Carlisle United were the only Cumbrian team to play senior football until Barrow A.F.C. rejoined the EFL in 2020.

Celtic Nation F.C. was a Carlisle-based semi-professional club who played in the Northern Football League Division One. They folded in April 2015 after a season of financial problems. Nation started out in 2004 as Gillford Park F.C. and played in the Northern Football Alliance league and won four promotions in 8 years. In 2012, Scottish millionaire Frank Lynch who is based in America, started putting money into the club and changed its name to Celtic Nation. After two years, Lynch withdrew his financial support and the club struggled before folding.

Carlisle City are a semi professional side who play in the Northern Football League. After spending 40 years in the Northern Football Alliance league, they were promoted to the North West Counties Football League in 2016, before being switched to their current league (at the same level) in 2019. They play at Gillford Park after taking over the lease from Celtic Nation in the summer of 2015.

Northbank Carlisle was a club which played its football in the Northern Football Alliance Premier Division. After forty years, the club decided to fold its senior team. Northbank still operates as a youth academy.

==== Rugby codes ====
Carlisle has two rugby union clubs: Carlisle RFC and Creighton RUFC. Carlisle RFC play at Warwick Road, alongside Carlisle United Football Club. Creighton RUFC originally played near Cumberland Infirmary but sold its ground to housing development company Story Homes in 2004 in exchange for new facilities off Cumwhinton Road, near Junction 42 of the M6. Former England rugby union captain Steve Borthwick is a native of Carlisle.

The rugby league team, Carlisle merged with Barrow and left Carlisle. Amateur rugby league club, Carlisle Centurions played in the National Division of the Rugby League Conference until they withdrew in 2010.

==== Gridiron ====
Carlisle Border Reivers were an American football team that played in Division 2 North until they folded in 2013. They rebranded as the Carlisle Kestrels in 2019, the team's original name. They play at Gillford Park.

=== Racing ===
In 1904, Carlisle Racecourse was established to the south of the city, it is now a first-class racecourse. Horse racing has been held in Carlisle for centuries before the racecourse was formally established.

Three greyhound racing venues existed in Carlisle during the late 1920s. All three were independent (not affiliated to the sport's governing body the National Greyhound Racing Club) and were known as a flapping tracks, which was the nickname given to independent tracks. The first was located at Gillford Park (home of the Carlisle Centurions RL and more recently Celtic Nation F.C.). The second was on pasture land in the former village of Harraby and was conducted by the Carlisle and Cumberland Greyhound Racing Sports Ltd. The third was north west of Carlisle on the Sheepmount playing fields and more recently the athletics track.

=== Other sport ===
Carlisle Cricket Club and Cumbria County Cricket Club play at the Edenside Ground north of the city centre. Cumberland is classed as a minor county by the ECB. The club has won the Minor Counties Championship twice. The remains of a Roman bathhouse associated with the Roman fort of Petriana have been excavated at the site.

Carlisle has several golf clubs, including Stoneyholme within the city, and Carlisle Golf Club which hosts regional qualifying to the Open Championship.

In 2012, Carlisle was one of the official stop-off points for the Olympic torch before it made its way down to the Olympic Games opening ceremony in London's Olympic Stadium.

== Armed forces ==
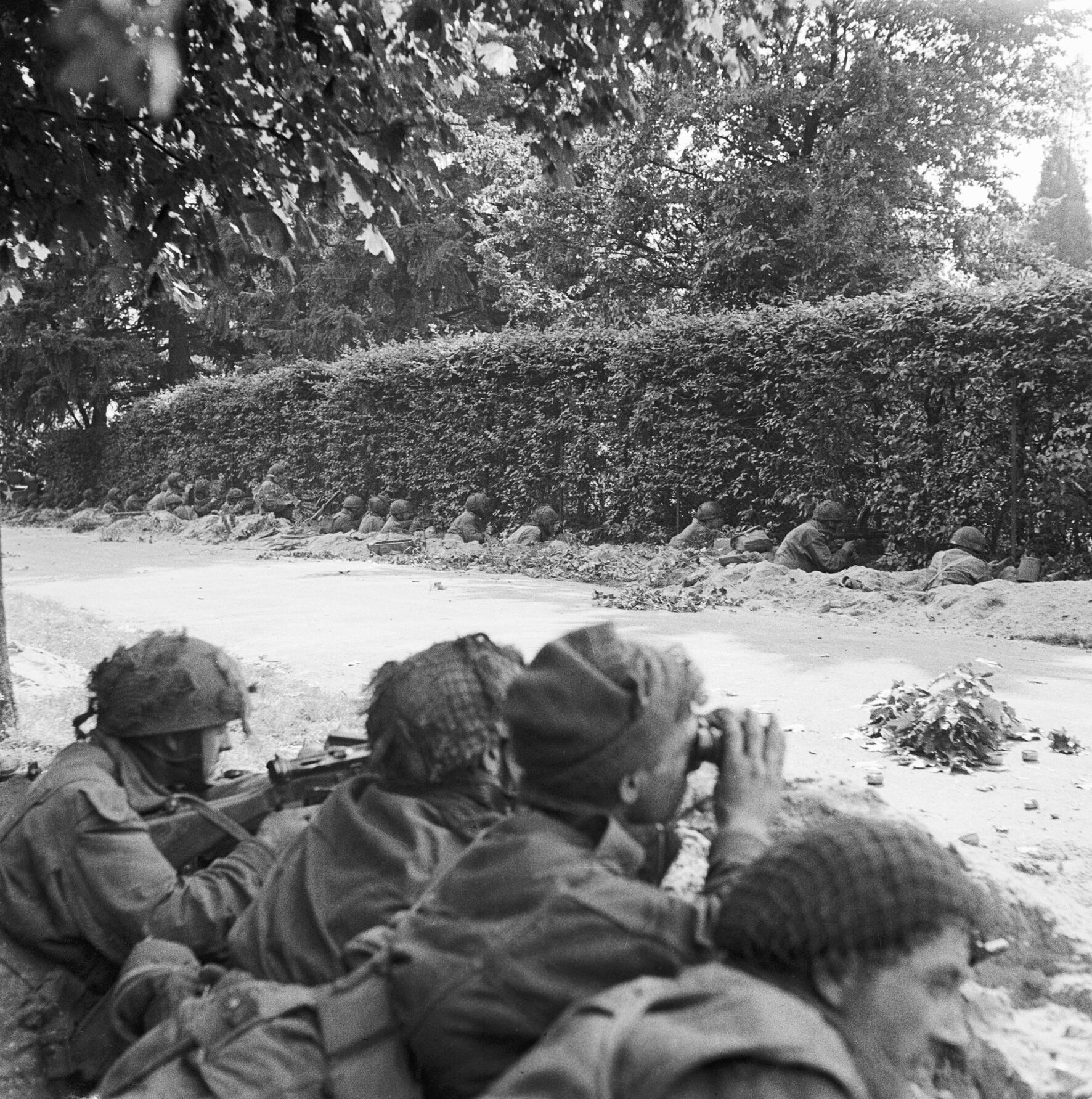
Men of C Company 1st Battalion, Border Regiment, waiting to repulse an attack by a German enemy barely 100 yd (91 m) away during the Battle of Arnhem in the Netherlands

As a frontier town for over a millennium and a half, Carlisle is a military city. It is the most besieged place in the British Isles, having been besieged at least ten times, and has garrisoned troops for most of its history. Cumbria's County regiment, the Border Regiment made its headquarters at Carlisle Castle. The regiment was amalgamated with the King's Own Royal Regiment (Lancaster) to become the King's Own Royal Border Regiment and subsequently the Duke of Lancaster's Regiment where its lineage continues. From 1720 to 1959, the regiment fought in many campaigns, including the French and Indian War, the Battle of Culloden, the First World War and the Second World War.

=== RAF Carlisle ===
RAF Carlisle, also known as 14 MU, was located at Kingstown near the present-day Asda. The station closed in 1996 after nearly sixty years in a variety of roles. First established as RAF Kingstown in 1938, it was originally a bomber station, then one of the RAF's Elementary Flying Training Schools and latterly a post-war storage facility.

=== RAF Spadeadam ===
The largest RAF station by area in the country and one of only two electronic warfare ranges in Europe, RAF Spadeadam is located outside the City of Carlisle but maintains strong links with the local community; in 2018, it was awarded the Freedom of the City of Carlisle.

=== Royal Observer Corps, Carlisle Group ===
During the Second World War the air raid warning organisation No 32 Group Carlisle Royal Observer Corps operated in the city centre controlled from RAF Kingstown. The association with Kingstown developed further in 1962 when the ROC ceased its aircraft spotting role for the RAF and took on a new role plotting nuclear explosions and warning the public of radioactive fallout for the United Kingdom Warning and Monitoring Organisation (UKWMO). A new administration building and a protected, hardened Nuclear Reporting bunker was built at RAF Carlisle. The nuclear bunker was a standard above-ground structure and both the bunker and headquarters hutting were on a separate site at Crindledyke outside the main gates of RAF Carlisle. The Carlisle group was redesignated no 22 Group ROC.

The ROC constructed a smaller nuclear reporting post, Kingstown post (OS ref:NY 3837 5920), on the main RAF Carlisle site. The post was an underground protected bunker for a crew of three observers. The headquarters bunker accommodated an operational crew of around 100 with dormitory and canteen facilities an operations room and life support plant.

The Royal Observer Corps was stood down and its parent organisation the UKWMO was disbanded in December 1995 after the end of the Cold War and as a result of recommendations in the governments Options for Change review of UK defence. The ROC buildings were demolished in 1996 and replaced by a cellphone communications mast. The foundations of the nuclear bunker can still be partially seen outlined in the concreted yard, which also contains the Air Training Corps hut during recent further development of the site.

== Legend and folklore ==
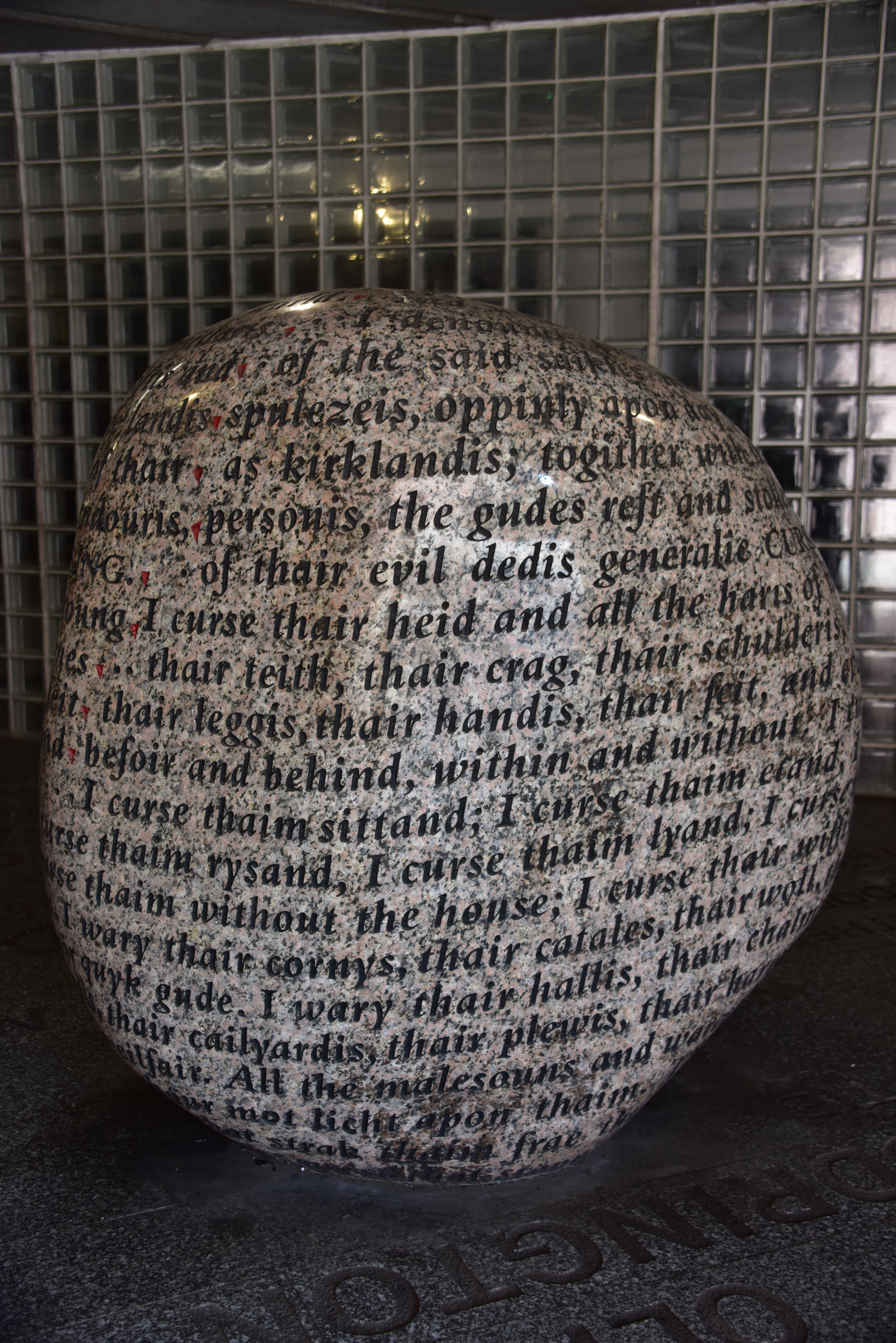
The Cursing Stone

=== Arthurian legend ===
There are many legends and folkloric stories about the city during the Dark Ages, such as the Sir Gawain and the Carle of Carlisle, about the nephew of King Arthur and the "free man" of the city.

In a 14th-century poem, legend has it that Sir Gawain, one of the Knights of the Round Table, stayed at the Castle of Carlisle while on a hunting expedition in the haunted Inglewood Forest. He then slept with the Carle's wife and killed him. This poem has strong parallels with another 14th century poem about Sir Gawain and the Green Knight. The story has since been re-adapted many times, most recently in films from 1973, 1984 and 2021.

By some accounts, Carlisle is also none other than Camelot, the mythical seat of King Arthur's court.

=== Curse of Carlisle ===
In local folklore, the Curse of Carlisle is a 16th-century curse that is said to have been invoked by Archbishop Dunbar of Glasgow in 1525 upon cross-border families, known as the Border Reivers, who lived by stealing cattle and pillaging. For the millennium celebrations, the local council commissioned a 14-tonne granite artwork inscribed with all 1,069 words of the curse. Following the installation of the stone, Carlisle suffered floods, foot-and-mouth disease, job losses and a "goal famine" for the football team. In response to this, the city council considered removing the stone; however, Kevin Carlyon, the self-titled "high priest of the British white witches", proclaimed that such actions would give the curse more power. He commented that: "a curse can only work if people believe in it. I think at the moment the sculpture is a nice piece of history, but if the council destroys it, they would be showing their belief in the curse."

== See also ==
- Listed buildings in Carlisle
- List of people associated with Carlisle
