= Syko Cipher Device =

British cipher apparatus used in World War II invented by Morgan O'Brien

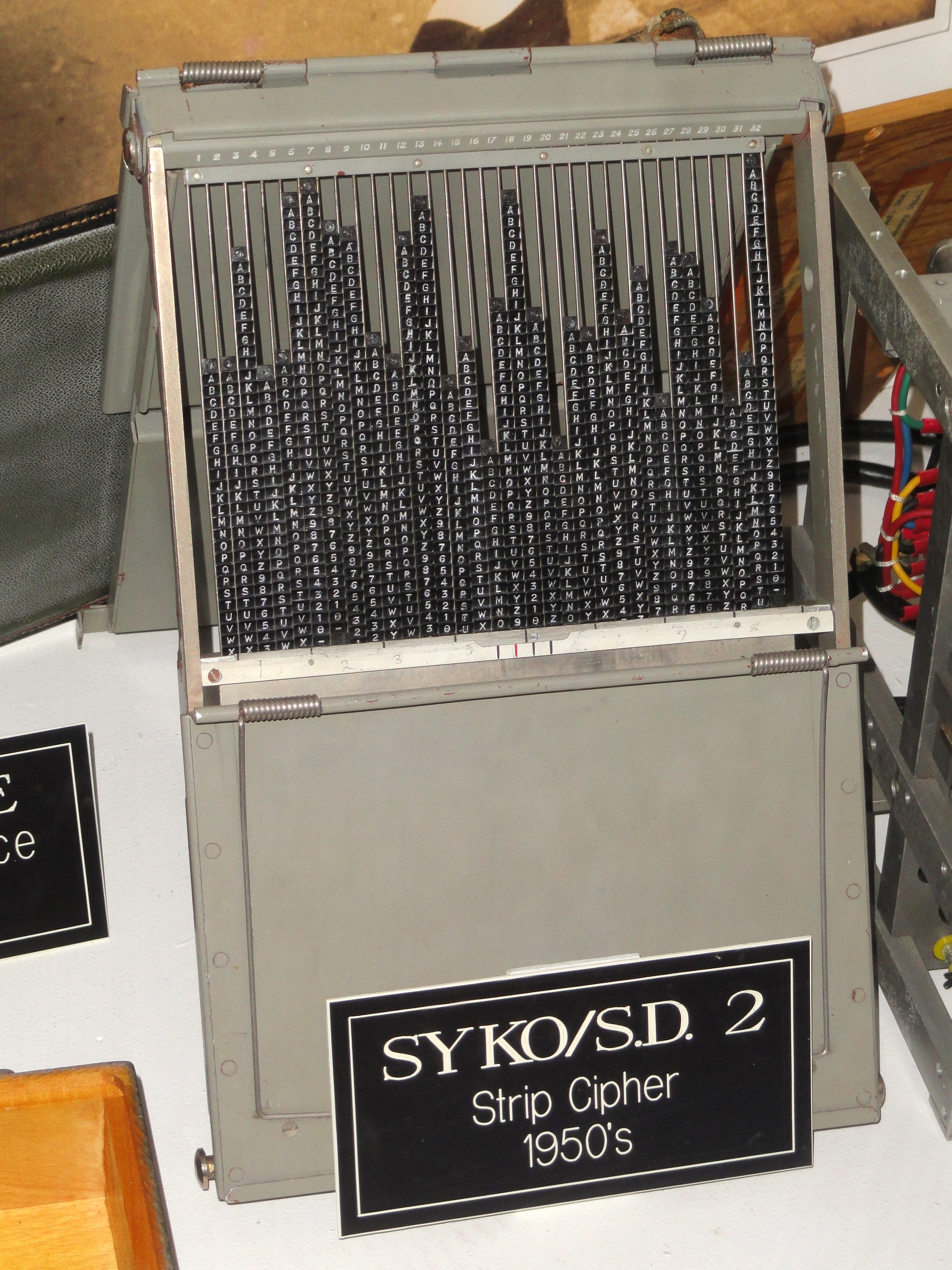
SYKO cipher device (NCM)

The SYKO cipher device was a compact British cipher apparatus in use during World War II. It was invented and patented by Morgan O'Brien before the war. O'Brien developed a sophisticated cipher typewriter, which was complex and delicate, but then came up with the relatively simple device adopted by the military that was known the SYKO. Although the German cryptanalysts managed to break the SYKO code, it remained in use for much of the war as a quick method for low-level encoding of radio traffic, particularly from aircraft. Code breaking took considerable time plus a sufficient sample of messages, and for certain classes of radio traffic (such as an aircraft's position) decoded information that became available many hours later was of little value.

== Description ==
The SYKO machine is a purely mechanical device. Details of its mechanical construction can be found in GB Patent 534615 (Morgan O'Brien and O'Brien Cipher Machines Ltd, London) Robust, small, and lightweight, it fitted in a brown hardcover case, with an optional canvas outer bag. A few machines survive, and operating instructions issued by the Royal Australian Air Force in November 1940 have been made available on-line.

When the grey top cover is opened up it reveals 32 vertical columns of letters. Each column has the characters reading downwards from A to Z then 9 to 0 followed by a pause character (37 characters in all). These columns are moveable on an endless band. The SYKO case contains a propelling pencil with a small brass pin at the other end, which is inserted in a notch at each letter allowing the columns to be moved as required. Use of the device requires the code card for that day. This is placed within the machine and is revealed as the columns are moved down.

The code card contains 32 columns of symbols, each column having the same 37 characters as in the moveable columns but in a random order. Code cards were different for each day, and usually aircraft only carried the card for the day. In the event that events dictated a flight unexpectedly went past midnight there was provision when sending code to indicate you were using an earlier days card. The characters on the code card were paired in each column (18 pairs) leaving a single character unpaired. The pairing means that, for example, if 'C' codes as 'R', then 'R' codes as 'C'. There is a 1 in 37 chance that a character will be the un-paired character and code as itself.

The bottom cover of the device can be slid in to reset all the columns to 'A' at the top. Encoding involves taking the special pencil and, for each column in turn, selecting the corresponding letter in the message using the pencil brass pin to draw down the moveable column so that letter is at the bottom bar thus revealing the code card underneath. The encoded message is then the lower-most symbol visible on the code card (i.e. above the 'A' in each moveable column). The original message is still visible along the bottom bar, so you can check the column placement hasn't moved. Due to the pairing of characters outlined above, the decoding of messages follows the same process, with it essential that both parties are using the same coding card. To avoid confusion between similar letters on the code card, the 'i' was in lower case, the zero had a line through it, and the 'e' was lower case.

The use of the reciprocal codes (e.g. A codes as Z, and Z codes as A) limited the variations possible, so in July 1942 non-reciprocal codes for SYKO and NYKO were introduced. This meant turning the code card over when changing from coding to decoding, but it did make the code significantly harder to break.

== History ==
Morgan O'Brien filed several patents while living in New Zealand related to burglar alarms and security on tills and shops. Around 1925 he came to England with his wife (via Vancouver and Montreal), and realised that while long-distance telegraph communication transformed the links between parts of the empire, the message information was not as private as letters and so there was a business opportunity for a technique for coding messages. Around 1927 the British military were also considering the problems of using unencrypted radio messages and in 1928 established the Wireless Messages Committee to look into the issues.

It was in 1928 that Morgan O'Brien patented a cipher typewriter. This machine has been described as Britain's Enigma machine in a detailed account of its evaluation by the UK and US military experts.

Morgan O'Brien had continued to develop the cipher typewriter at least until 1935 when he issued a further patent, but possibly as a reaction to the problems brought about by his complex machine he came up with the device that was to become known as SYKO, which he patented in 1939. This was adopted, and was in use by September 1939 as evidenced by the Air Traffic Control log for Ronaldsway on 2 September 1939 which records the Air Ministry controller taking over and taking possession of the Syko cards.

An Admiralty document from November 1945, formerly Top Secret, now declassified, reviews Naval codes and ciphers used during the war and also gives some insight on the usage of SYKO by the RAF. This shows that the SYKO device was first distributed to the Navy in early 1939, with Navy Peacetime code cards. At the start of WW2 Naval War Cards and RAF War cards were brought into use, followed early in 1940 by Inter-Service cards.

For the first 2 years of the war the Navy used the Syko with Naval cards as the standard low-grade system for communication with vessels such as auxiliary minesweepers, anti-submarine craft, examination vessels, harbour defence vessels, MTBs, etc. - none of which carried a high grade code capability. This was replaced by a small ships code in August 1941 (S.P. 02383) known by its prefix LOXO.

List of RAF and Navy SYKO code card series
Code Card Series	Start	End	Description
Navy Peacetime	Early 1939	Sept 1939	Discontinued when war broke out
S.P. 02255	Sept 1939	?	Naval wartime SYKO cards
S.P. 02266	Sept 1939	1 June 1943	R.A.F. card series
S.P. 02342	Early 1940	1 June 1942	Inter-service code cards (replaced by Cysquare)
S.P. 02435	March 1942	?	Middle-East cards for use by RAF and Navy in the Mediterranean
S.P. ?	1 April 1942	1 July 1943	North-Atlantic cards for UK and Gibraltar based aircraft
S.P. ?	1 July 1942	>1945	Naval non-reciprocal code cards*
S.P. 02308	1 June 1943	>1944	R.A.F. world-wide card series - non-reciprocal code cards

* Implied change as Admiralty document states non-reciprocal code cards introduced on 1 July 1942, and states RAF was still on SP 02266 until 1 June 1943.

On 1 April 1942 another special series of cards was introduced for aircraft operating in the North Atlantic, solely for shore-based aircraft operating from the UK and Gibraltar (i.e. for the Coastal Command operations to protect convoys). 1 July 1942 marked the introduction of non-reciprocal cards to improve the security. On 1 July 1943 coastal command dropped usage of SYKO, instead using a new Aircraft Reporting Code (S.P. 2488).

Naval aircraft continued to use the SKYO code with Naval cards in 1944, and at the time the Admiralty report was written (late 1945) the Naval version of SYKO (NYKO) was still in use for carrier-borne aircraft and some small craft.

With several sets of cards there were occasions when a vessel would need more than one, as was evident from the report on the loss of HMS Khartoum in June 1940, in which the accounts list a SYKO machine, instructions for use of SYKO machine, and both naval and RAF SYKO cards.

This complex series of releases of different code cards appear to have all used the same SYKO device with little or no modification - however the Admiralty report does say that in March 1942 the SYKO devices were in short supply, and that "Rekoh" cases were issued to use with the SYKO cards in their place.

The SYKO device was used for RAF aircraft communications until at least June 1944 (from operations logs, e.g. 200 Squadron Record of Operations).

A small number of SYKO devices have survived in private collections or museums, in the UK the Solway Aviation Museum has a Syko Cipher Device on display.
