= Harold Armytage Sanders =

English optician, photographer & actor (1867–1940)

Harold Armytage Sanders, F.R.P.S. (24 May 1867 – 4 September 1940) also known by the full name Harold Armytage Thomas Sanders, was the father of World War I photographer Henry Armytage Bradley Sanders of New Zealand fame. As an optician he worked for W. Watson and Son. He went into business with Crowhurst with the business named Sanders and Crowhurst, and then was in business by himself as Sanders and Company.

== Life and times ==
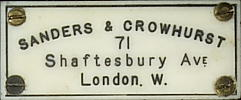
Sanders & Crowhurst optician sign

In 1881, Sanders at the age of 13 went to work for W. Watson and Son, a company that manufactured cameras and optical equipment. Harry Arthur Crowhurst also worked at Watson & Sons. In 1900, Sanders and Crowhurst decided to form their own business and they left the employ of Watson & Sons and formed Sanders & Crowhurst, as proprietors of a photographic equipment and lantern supply business. At Sanders & Crowhurst, the team were agents for the W. Watson and Son company. The partnership was dissolved in 1908. Sanders continued in business as an optician at Sanders & Co. until 1910 when he filed for bankruptcy.

In 1885, Sanders married Louise Augusta Watkins at Southwark St Saviour, London, England.

In 1891, the Census recorded the Sanders family as Harold A. Sanders, age 24, wife Louisa A., age 23, and 3 sons, Henry A.B., age 4, Victor H.F., age 2, and Harold D., age 1. Occupation listed was opticians assistant. The family resided at 74 Leighton Road, Pancras, London in the St. Pancras parish of Kentish Town.

In 1899, Harold Armytage Thomas Sanders and Louise Augusta Sanders were granted a divorce. On 4 September 1940, Sanders, age 73 died at Hampstead, London, England.

== Acting career ==
In January 1920, Sanders was in the theatrical production as an extra in the play by Anton Chekhov, "On the High Road" at St Martin's Theatre. Edith Craig was responsible for production. In June 1920, Sanders was in the theatrical production as an extra in the play by Staint-Georges de Bouhélier, "The Children's Carnival" (Le Carnaval des enfants) at Kingsway Theatre. Edith Craig was responsible for production.

On 22 July 1928, Harold Armytage Sanders wrote a letter address to Miss Craig, (Edith Craig) at The Cottage, Bigwood Road, Hampstead Garden Suburb NW11 regarding the death of Ellen Terry. Ellen Terry had died on 21 July 1928. The correspondence was a handwritten and signed 2-page letter of condolence on the death of Ellen Terry, and an apology that he could not attend the memorial service.

== Films ==
=== In Birdland ===
In 1907, Sanders teamed with natural history photographer and filmmaker Oliver Gregory Pike for the pioneering nature film production, In Birdland. The film was the first British wildlife film to be screened to a paying audience. In August 1907, In Birdland premiered at London's Palace Theatre of Varieties. The initial screening of the film was so successful, an additional 100 copies were made. Due to the popularity and demand, this would allow the film to be screened in cinemas throughout the United Kingdom. Unfortunately, none of the copies remain to this day as they were either subsequently lost or destroyed. The photographic team of Pike and Sanders employed groundbreaking techniques and jeopardised themselves as they took their cameras over coastal cliffs and dangled from ropes to capture a glimpse into the environment of Great Britain's seabirds. The rarely captured or seen film footage introduced the viewing audience into the intimate lives of kittiwakes, gannets, cormorants and puffins.

=== Guillemots ===
Guillemots. (1907) Filmmakers: Oliver Pike and H. Armytage Sanders.

== Photographic exhibits ==
For several year, Sanders regularly displayed his photographic works at the Annual Exhibitions of the Royal Photographic Society of Great Britain. In 1907, the Exhibition Catalogue entry for Sanders & Crowhurst, located at 71, Shaftesbury Avenue, London, W., and 55, Western Road, Hove, Brighton included a listing for the current offerings. These included:

"The Birdland Camera, latest model; with Interchangeable Hoods for Natural History or ordinary work; "Lodge" Hood, with Telescopic Eyepiece. The Naturalist's Tripod and Tilting Table, made specifically for photographing Nests, Flowers, Fungi, Seashore Life, &c. The "Birdland" Tilting Board. The Southport patent Enlarging Easels and Tables for Enlarging or making Enlarged Negatives. A Series of Pictures taken with the Birdland Camera by Oliver G. Pike, F.R.P.S., AND h. Armytage Sanders. The Birdlander's Binocular, a new pattern; Prismatic Glass, specifically suitable to Naturalists. The Blocknote Cameras and new Tripod for same."

The explanation that follows describes the notations after each exhibit listing, and is taken from the Exhibition Catalogue.

"The price in all cases is for the exhibit and includes the frame but does not include packing nor delivery. The Clerk in charge will effect sales and give receipts, he is not permitted to sell pictures except for cash. O, indicates the original as framed..."

=== 1907 exhibit ===
1907 Fifty-second Annual Exhibition of the Royal Photographic Society of Great Britain.

- 334. Gannet and young on nest. O. 15/-
- 335. Young Gannet (in down). O. 15/-
- 336. Female Gannet returning to nest, distinctly showing method of alighting. O. 15/-
- 337. Gannet and young on nest (taken ... with single combination of Dagor Series III. lens, camera extension 18 inches). O. 15/-
- 342. Sea Birds. (A selection of bromide prints from film negatives taken by the cinematograph. Oliver G. Pike and H. Armytage Sanders.

=== 1909 exhibit ===
1909 Fifty-fourth Annual Exhibition of the Royal Photographic Society of Great Britain.

- 311. reed bunting Cock, feeding young (enlargement untouched).
- 315. Reed Bunting hen and young (enlargement untouched).
- 318. Reed Bunting.

=== 1911 exhibit ===
1911 Fifty-sixth Annual Exhibition of the Royal Photographic Society of Great Britain.

- 562. Cormorants on Nests.

=== 1913 exhibit ===
1913 Fifty-eighth Annual Exhibition of the Royal Photographic Society of Great Britain.

- 646. Young Kestrels, 23 days old. They do not leave the nest until from 28 to 30 days old and by then nearly all traces of nestling down have disappeared. In the photograph the nestling down is still plentiful.
- 647. king vulture with wings spread.

=== 1914 exhibit ===
1914 Fifty-ninth Annual Exhibition of the Royal Photographic Society of Great Britain.

- 476. Study of sedge warbler.

=== 1915 exhibit ===
1915 Sixtieth Annual Exhibition of the Royal Photographic Society of Great Britain.

- 299. king vulture.
- 300. Wren at entrance to nest.

== Use of Birdland camera ==
In the spring of 1914, Maud Doria Haviland during her travels on the Yenesei River in Russia, used a "Birdland" quarter-plate reflex camera with a 14-inch focal length lens that was built by H. Armytage Sanders of London.

== Awards and honours ==
- Royal Photographic Society, member, 1902
- Royal Photographic Society, fellow, 1907 F.R.P.S.

== Publications ==
- Environment.
- The decline of dissolving views.
