= Listed buildings in Irthington =

Irthington is a civil parish in the Cumberland district of Cumbria, in North West England. It contains 31 listed buildings that are recorded in the National Heritage List for England. Of these, one is listed at Grade II*, the middle of the three grades, and the others are at Grade II, the lowest grade. The parish contains the village of Irthington, and the smaller settlements of Laversdale, Newby East, Oldwall, Ruleholme, and Newtown, and is otherwise rural. Most of the listed buildings are farmhouses and farm buildings, and the others include private houses, milestones, a bridge, a war memorial, and a church.

== Key ==
Grade	Criteria
II*	Particularly important buildings of more than special interest
II	Buildings of national importance and special interest

== Buildings ==
Name and location	Photograph	Date	Notes	Grade
St Kentigern's Church; 54.94681°N 2.78405°W		12th century	Aisles and a clerestory were added in 1849–53, followed by the tower in 1897. The church is in sandstone, some taken from the Roman Wall, and it has a slate roof with decorative ridge tiles. The church consists of a nave with aisles, a chancel with a south vestry, and a northwest tower. The tower has three stages, angle buttresses, a pointed entrance, string courses, a clock face on the north side, and a battlemented parapet. Inside the church the arcades have round columns and round arches.	II*
Bleatarn Park; 54.94204°N 2.83462°W	—	Early 17th century (probable)	The front of the farmhouse dates from the late 17th century; it is rendered with stone dressings, quoins, and a green slate roof with coped gables. It has 2 1/2 storeys and five bays. The doorway has a moulded architrave and entablature and a segmental pediment. The windows are horizontally sliding sashes. The older part incorporated at the rear is in sandstone on a plinth and has two storeys. There is a washhouse extension to the left that has a casement window with a lintel re-used as a sill.	II
Cambeckhill and barn 54.96506°N 2.76993°W	—	17th century	The front of the farmhouse dates from the 18th century. It is in sandstone and has a Welsh slate roof. There are two storeys and five bays. The rear is built with stones from the nearby Roman wall, some of which are decorated. The doorway has a quoined and chamfered surround and a weathered lintel, and the sash windows have plain surrounds. The barn has five bays and contains casement windows.	II
The Cottage; 54.94714°N 2.81279°W	—	Mid 17th century	The cottage is in stone with a slate roof, it is in a single storey, and has three bays. The doorway has a plain surround. To its left are two small windows with chamfered sills, one with the remains of a mullion. To the right is a later casement window and a blocked fire window.	II
The Nook and barn 54.94607°N 2.78369°W	—	Mid or late 17th century	The farmhouse and barn are in sandstone and have a slate roof. Some of the stones come from the nearby Roman wall, and some of them are decorated. There are two storeys and three bays. The doorway has a moulded wooden surround and a dentilled wooden cornice, and it contains a studded door. The windows have chamfered mullions and contain sashes. The barn to the left has a large cart entrance, plank doors, a loft door, and ventilation slits.	II
Stonewalls; 54.95318°N 2.81958°W	—	1672	A farmhouse that was extended in the 19th century and further altered in the 20th century. It has a pebbledashed front, it is in sandstone at the rear, and has a Welsh slate roof. There are two storeys and four bays, and the original doors and windows have been replaced. At the rear is an entrance with a shouldered moulded architrave and a panel above it. The panel is inscribed and dated, and is decorated with ducks and flowers, and above it is a hood mould.	II
Broomhill and barn 54.98771°N 2.80661°W	—	Late 17th century (probable)	The farmhouse was extended in 1797, it is in sandstone, the original part has a Welsh slate roof, the roof of the extension is in stone-slate, and both have coped gables. Both parts have two storeys, the older part has three bays, and the extension has two. The windows are sashes, some of them horizontally-sliding. The doorway has a plain surround and an inscribed and dated lintel. The barn to the right dates from the 18th century, and contains ventilation slits, and a blocked mullioned window.	II
Broomwell and barn 54.98692°N 2.80808°W	—	1682	The farmhouse was extended to the rear in 1824; it is in sandstone with a green slate roof. There are two storeys and three bays, with the former barn to the right. The house has a doorway with a stone surround and an inscribed and dated lintel, the windows are sashes with stone surrounds, and there is a small fire window. The barn contains an arched cart entrance, and a blocked doorway, loft door and ventilation slits.	II
East Old Wall and outbuildings 54.94775°N 2.81060°W	—	1701	The farmhouse was restored in 1888 and is in sandstone with a Welsh slate roof. There are two storeys and four bays, with a single-bay extension to the left, another extension at the rear, single-storey outbuildings beyond them, and a barn to the right. The doorway has a quoined surround and a fanlight, and the windows in the main part are sashes in plain surrounds. There is also a small blocked window with a chamfered surround and a sundial above it. The windows in the extension are casements. The outbuildings contain doors and sash windows, and at the rear is a re-used lintel stone that is inscribed and dated, as is the lintel below, and above is a shield with a cockerel. The barn has two arched cart entrances and a plank door.	II
Prior Rigg; 54.99411°N 2.80956°W	—	Early 18th century	The farmhouse is in rendered sandstone, and has a stone-slate roof with coped gables. There are two storeys, a cellar, and six bays. The doorway has a moulded surround and an entablature with a moulded cornice. The windows are sashes with chamfered surrounds, some of which are blocked, and there are small cellar windows.	II
Newby Hall; 54.91753°N 2.81968°W		Mid 18th century	A rendered farmhouse with stone dressings, and a Welsh slate roof with coped gables. There are two storeys and four bays. The doorway has a moulded architrave and entablature, and a moulded triangular pediment. The windows are sashes with plain surrounds.	II
Scare; 54.97756°N 2.81279°W	—	Mid 18th century	A farmhouse with rendered walls and a Welsh slate roof with coped gables. There are two storeys and two bays, with a single-storey extension to the right. The doorway has a moulded chamfered surround, and the windows are double sashes in plain surrounds.	II
Ruleholme Bridge; 54.93363°N 2.79270°W		1753	The bridge carries a road over the River Irthing, and originally formed part of the Carlisle to Newcastle Military Road. It is in sandstone and consists of three round arches that have been reinforced by brick. There are two piers with cutwaters, and a solid parapet.	II
Milestone; 54.93197°N 2.79458°W		1758 (probable)	The milestone was provided for the Carlisle to Newcastle Military Road, which later became the Carlisle to Temon Turnpike. It is in sandstone and is chamfered to give two faces. On each face is a cast iron plate inscribed with the distance in miles to Carlisle and Newcastle.	II
Milestone; 54.93152°N 2.81835°W	—	1758 (probable)	The milestone was provided for the Carlisle to Newcastle Military Road, which later became the Carlisle to Temon Turnpike. It is in sandstone and is chamfered to give two faces. On each face is a cast iron plate inscribed with the distance in miles to Carlisle and Newcastle.	II
Westknowe and farm buildings 54.98169°N 2.80811°W	—	1763	The farmhouse is rendered with stone dressings, and has a Welsh slate roof with coped gables. There are two storeys, four bays, a projecting porch, and sash windows with plain surrounds. At the rear of the house are sandstone farm buildings forming a square farmyard. These contain cart entrances, doorways, loft doors and ventilation slits, some of which are blocked.	II
The Beck Farmhouse; 54.96314°N 2.77395°W	—	Late 18th century	The main part of the house is stuccoed with stone dressings, quoins, and a green slate roof. It has two storeys and three bays, with a single-storey two-bay extension to the right; the extension is in sandstone. The doorway has a fanlight and a rounded architrave with a reeded keystone and impost blocks.	II
The Croft, Irthington; 54.94671°N 2.78542°W	—	Late 18th century	A house with rendered walls, sandstone dressings, quoins, and a slate roof. There are two storeys and three bays, flanked by single-storey single-bay wings with hipped roofs. The round-headed doorway has quoined surround and a fanlight with a keystone. The windows are sashes with plain stone surrounds. The doorways in the wings are flat-headed with quoined surrounds.	II
Barn, East Old Wall; 54.94786°N 2.81123°W	—	Late 18th century	The barn is in sandstone with a roof of stone-slate and Welsh slate. There are two storeys, numerous bays, and a single-storey extension to the right. The barn has a projecting entrance, an arched cart entrance, and other entrances, including a loft door with external steps leading up to it.	II
Gallowberry and barn 54.94843°N 2.78113°W	—	Late 18th century	The house and barn are in sandstone with Welsh slate roofs, the front of the house is rendered and has quoins. There are two storeys in the house and three bays, with a single-bay extension to the right. The doorway and the sash windows have plain stone surrounds. The barn projects at right angles, and contains plank doors, steel casement windows, and ventilation slits.	II
Holcombe House; 54.94575°N 2.78603°W	—	Late 18th century	A sandstone house with a slate roof, in two storeys and three bays. The round-headed doorway has a plain surround and a radial fanlight with reeded springers and a false keystone. The windows are sashes with plain stone surrounds.	II
The Hollies; 54.94835°N 2.78135°W	—	Late 18th century	A rendered house that has a hipped slate roof. There are two storeys and two bays. The doorway and the sash windows have round heads, and in front of the doorway is a tiled porch.	II
Old Wall Farmhouse; 54.94704°N 2.81471°W	—	Late 18th century	The farmhouse has rendered walls, stone dressings, quoins, and a Welsh slate roof. There are two storeys, three bays, and a lower two-storey one-bay extension to the right. The doorway has a plain surround, a fanlight, and a round head with a false keystone. The windows are sashes.	II
Orchard House; 54.95797°N 2.78196°W	—	1783	A rendered house with stone dressings, quoins, and a Welsh slate roof. There are two storeys and two bays, with a two-storey single-bay extension to the left. The doorway has an alternate block surround, and a flat head with a large inscribed and dated keystone. Most of the windows in the main part are casements, some of which are triple, and in the extension they are sashes.	II
Wall House and barn 54.94405°N 2.78806°W	—	1793	The house and former barn are in sandstone and have a Welsh slate roof with a stone ridge. The house has quoins, and a doorway with a plain surround. There are two storeys and two bays with a small single-storey extension to the left. The windows in the main part are triple casements, and in the extension they are sashes. The barn to the right has been converted into a garage, and contains a large door and filled ventilation slits.	II
Milestone; 54.95676°N 2.77037°W	—	1807	The milestone was provided for the Longtown to Brampton Turnpike. It is in sandstone, and consists of a squared stone set at an angle. The milestone is incised on two faces with numbers indicating the distances in miles to Longtown and to Brampton.	II
Milestone; 54.96184°N 2.79308°W	—	1807	The milestone was provided for the Longtown to Brampton Turnpike. It is in sandstone, and consists of a squared stone set at an angle. The milestone is incised on two faces with numbers indicating the distances in miles to Longtown and to Brampton.	II
The Croft, Newby East; 54.91714°N 2.81996°W	—	Early 19th century	A sandstone farmhouse with quoins, a dentilled gutter, and a Welsh slate roof. There are two storeys and three bays. The doorway has a plain surround and a moulded triangular pediment, and the windows are sashes with plain surrounds.	II
Newby Demesne Farmhouse and outbuilding 54.91702°N 2.81849°W		Mid 19th century	The farmhouse is in Scottish Baronial style, built in sandstone with a Welsh slate roof. It consists of s 2 1/2-storey tower with an extension in two storeys and two and three bays. The tower has a corbelled battlemented parapet with crow-stepped gables. In front of the tower is a three-storey projecting bay with a crow-stepped gable surmounted by a cross finial. The extension has a corbelled cornice, a crow-stepped gable and a first-floor semicircular angle turret with a conical roof. The windows are sashes. The outbuilding is at right angles and has plank doors and sash windows.	II
Screen wall and gazebos, Newby Demesne Farmhouse; 54.91695°N 2.81832°W	—	Mid 19th century	The garden wall and gazebos are in sandstone. The wall is low with chamfered coping. At each end is a circular gazebo; the one on the left with a lancet opening, a moulded cornice, and a domed roof with a ball finial; the other is smaller with a moulded cornice but no roof.	II
War memorial 54.94695°N 2.78442°W		1922	The war memorial is in the churchyard of St Kentigern's Church. It is in grey granite, and consists of a wheel-head cross with a tapering shaft on a plinth on a base of one step. The front of the cross and the upper shaft contain knot-work carving and a date. On the lower part of the shaft and the plinth are inscriptions and the names of those lost in the two World Wars.	II
