= Solway Aviation Museum =

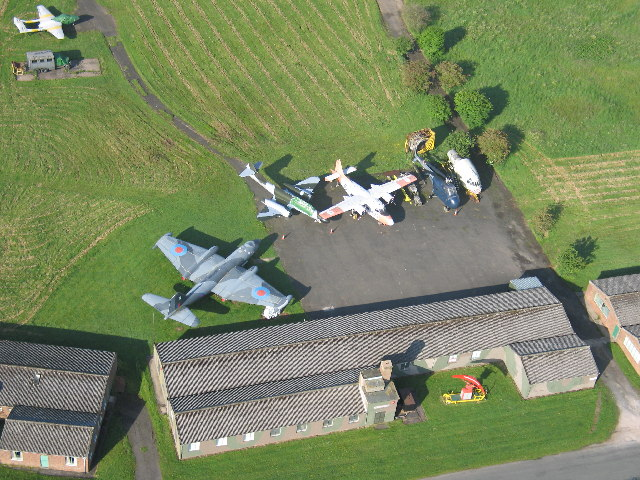

- Location within England Location within Cumbria Location within the former City of Carlisle district
- Established: 1961; 65 years ago
- Location: Carlisle Lake District Airport; Irthington; Cumbria
- Coordinates: 54.9432°N 2.8056°W
- Type: Aviation museum
- Website: www.solway-aviation-museum.co.uk

The Solway Aviation Museum is an aviation museum located at Carlisle Lake District Airport in Cumbria.

== About ==
The Museum is run by The Solway Aviation Society and staffed by volunteers. The Society is a registered charity supported by entrance charges to the Museum, and public donations. In addition to normal opening the Museum hosts educational visits for school classes studying the Second World War and for Scouts achieving their Air Activities Badge. Following the closure of the RAF Millom Museum, many of the artefacts were moved to Solway Aviation Museum for safe keeping and eventual exhibition when space permits.

The Buildings contain exhibits and artefacts relating to aviation in Cumbria, including the Second World War and also houses individual displays featuring the development of the Blue Streak missile, Martin-Baker ejection seats, and the development and activities of the Airport itself since the Second World War.

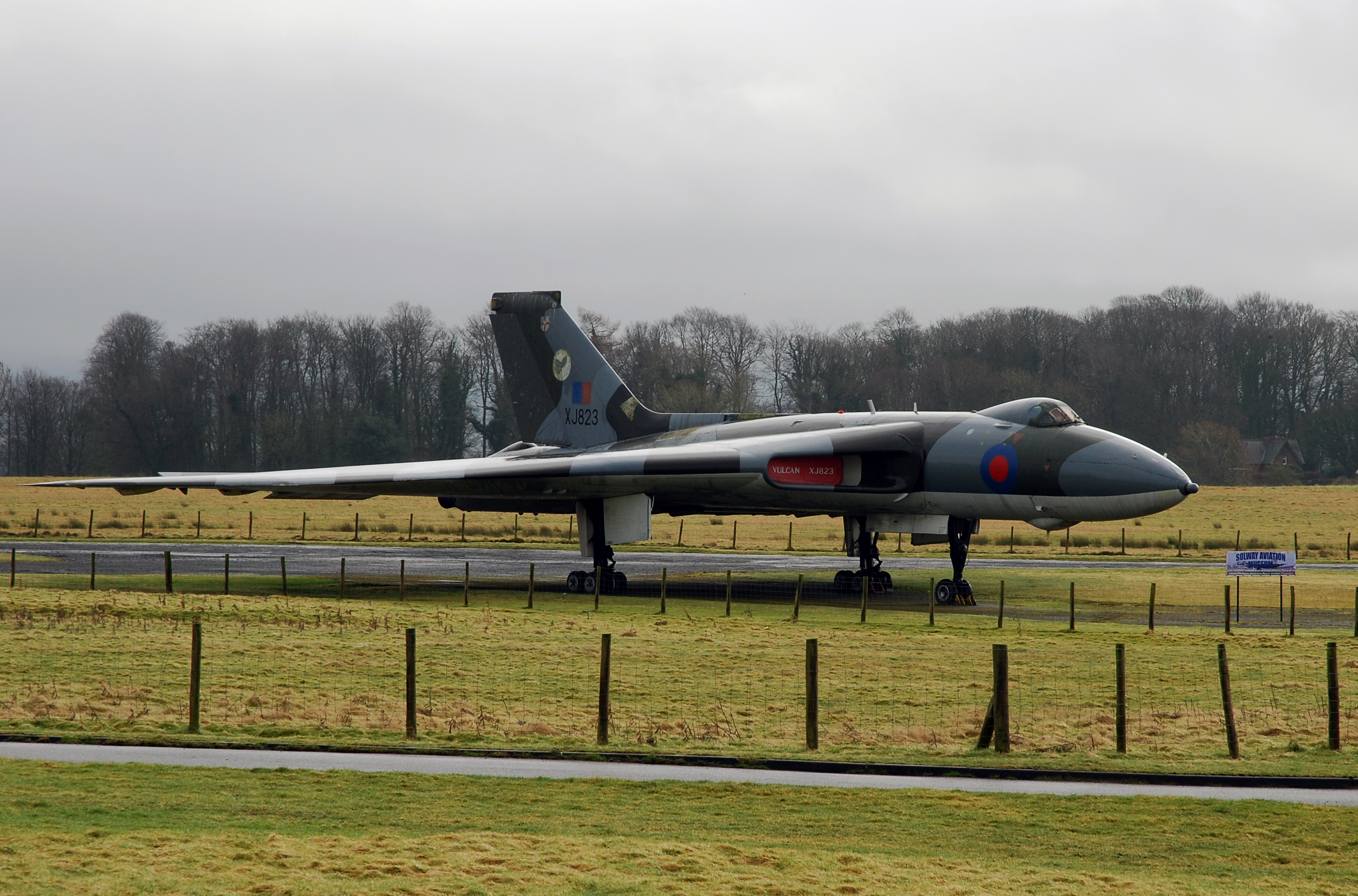
Avro Vulcan XJ823

== History ==
In April 2024, the museum raised enough money to move the only surviving Blackburn Beverly to the museum from Fort Paull. Seven months later, the museum received a Tornado GR1 which had been a gate guard at RAF Spadeadam.

== Collection ==
The current collection includes the following:

Aircraft	Serial	Notes
Avro Vulcan B.2	XJ823	Royal Air Force, it was flown into Carlisle Airport in January 1983, after the Falklands War
BAC Jet Provost T.4	XS209	Royal Air Force, was used as a training airframe
BAC Lightning F.53	ZF583	Former Royal Saudi Air Force painted in Royal Air Force markings.
DH Vampire T.11	WZ515	Royal Air Force
Fairey Gannet ECM.6	XA459	
Gloster Meteor NF.14	WS832	Built by Armstrong Whitworth, last used at the Royal Aerospace Establishment Llandbedr, Wales
English Electric Canberra T.4	WE188	Royal Air Force
Hawker Hunter F.51	XG190	Former Royal Danish Air Force aircraft painted to represent an aircraft of the Empire Test Pilot's School
McDonnell Douglas Phantom FGR.2	XV406	Royal Air Force, formerly a gate guard at 14 MU RAF Carlisle
Panavia Tornado GR.1		Royal Air Force
Percival Sea Prince T.1	WP314	Royal Navy
SEPECAT Jaguar T.4	XX146	
Sikorsky Whirlwind HAR.21	WV198	Royal Navy

== See also ==
- Carlisle Lake District Airport
- List of aerospace museums
