= Oliver G. Pike =

British naturalist

Oliver G. Pike F.Z.S., F.R.P.S.
- Born: Oliver Gregory Pike; 1 October 1877; Enfield, Middlesex
- Died: 17 October 1963 (aged 86); Leighton Buzzard, England
- Education: Enfield Grammar School
- Occupations: naturalist, photographer, film maker
- Years active: 1900–1947
- Employers: Pathé Frères; British Instructional Films/ Gaumont-British Instructional Films
- Known for: In Birdland, Secrets of Nature

Oliver Gregory Pike, FZS, FRPS. (usually credited as Oliver G. Pike; 1 October 1877 – 17 October 1963) was a British naturalist, wildlife photographer, author and early nature documentary pioneer, specialising in the study of bird life. "His claim to significance," according to Bryony Dixon of BFI Screenonline, "lies in the groundbreaking techniques he developed to capture animals in their natural habitats and in the fact that he passed this knowledge on."

== Biography ==
Pike studied at Enfield Grammar School until 1893, where he became friends with local commercial photographer and ornithologist Reginald Badham Lodge, who specialised in bird photography. Pike accompanied Lodge while he worked, taking his first photograph of a wild flower at the age of 13, in the autumn of 1890. In 1895 the two invented a bird-activated trip-wire releases, which effectively allowed birds to take their own pictures. Pike developed a profound knowledge of photographic techniques and went on to publish a series of 25 handbooks on ornithological photography and cinematography, starting with In Birdland with Field Glass and Camera (1900). He also developed his own stills camera, marketed as The Birdland Camera by Sanders & Crowhurst of Shaftesbury Avenue, London, and later a cine-camera for wildlife photography that was camouflaged so as not to frighten off the subjects.

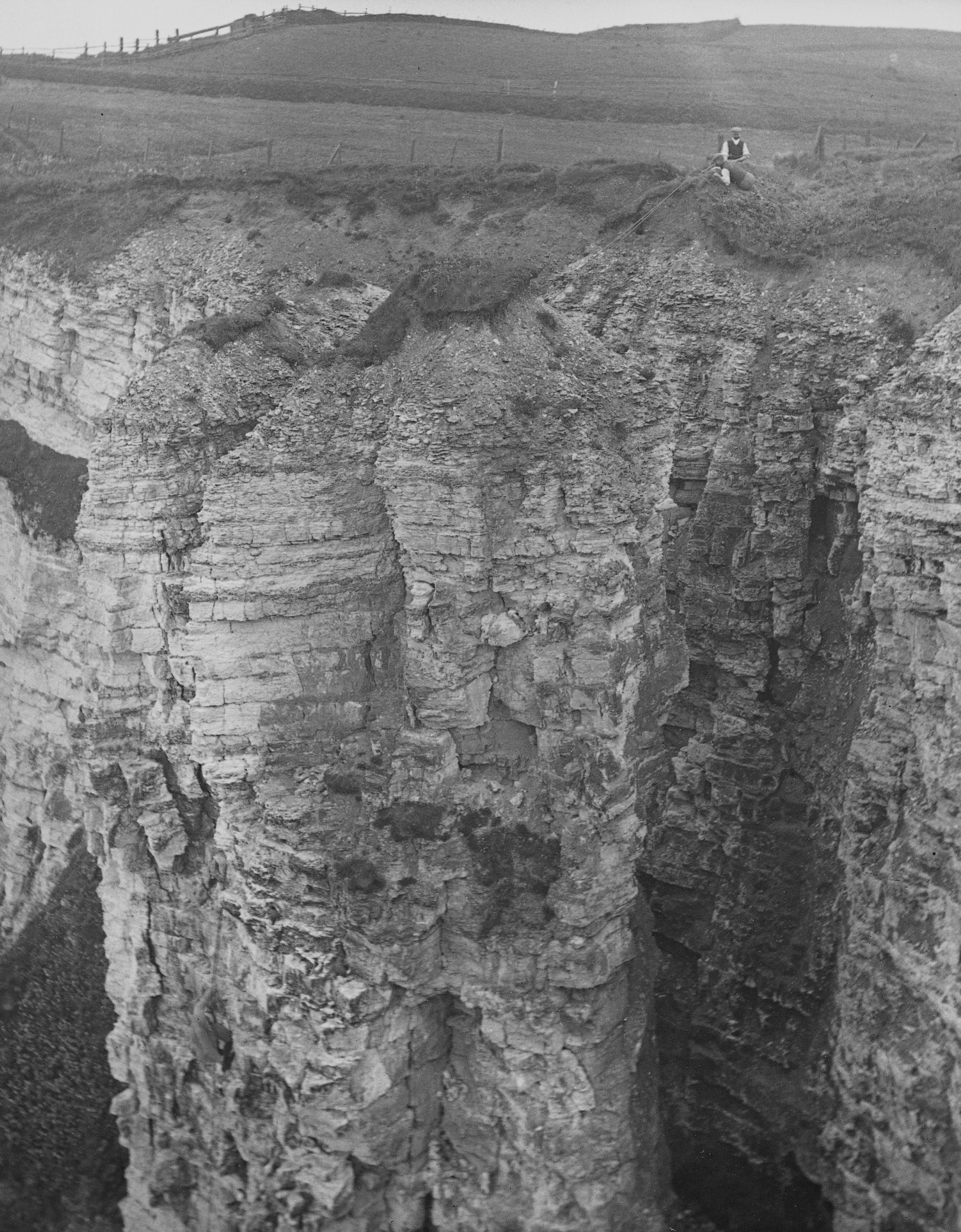
A local man (bottom left -blurry) climbs Hateley Shute on Flamborough Head in around 1908

Pike's first film, In Birdland, which premiered at the Palace Theatre, London in August 1907, was the first British wildlife film to be screened to a fee paying audience. Together with cinematographer Harold Armytage Sanders, Pike took great physical risks hanging from ropes over coastal cliffs to capture unprecedented footage of Britain's seabirds, including kittiwakes, gannets, cormorants and puffins. The film proved hugely popular in its 6-week run with over 100 additional prints were made for screenings across the UK. All copies are now however believed lost or destroyed. He made two more films along a similar theme, St Kilda, Its People and Birds (1908) and Cliff Climbing – The Egg Harvest of Flamborough Head (1908), before becoming director of photography for Pathé Frères from 1910 to 1920, where he made Glimpses of Bird Life (1910), noted for its use of positioning which was "years ahead of their time" and "helped to establish British wildlife photographers as leaders in this field."

During the First World War, he served in the Royal Flying Corps, and its successor, the Royal Air Force, as a photographic officer.

In 1921, Pike went to work for old friend Harry Bruce Wolfe at British Instructional Films on the single-reel series Secrets of Nature series. His inaugural film for the series was The Cuckoo's Secret (1922), commissioned by Edgar Chance, which changed public perception of how common cuckoos reproduce by providing the first proof that they lay their eggs directly in the nests of the species they parasitise rather than laying them on the ground and carrying them to the nest. Over the course of the next 11 years, Smith blended "nature photography with painstaking laboratory work," on the series, "providing an atmospheric account of British wildlife," which filmmaker, historian and critic Paul Rotha described in 1930 as "the sheet anchor of the British film industry." He later went on to work for Gaumont-British Instructional Films on the similar Secrets of Life series, where he made the controversial A Family of Great Tits (1934), highlighting the brutality of nature with footage from a specially constructed nesting box. Working until 1947, he made over 50 films many of which showed animal behaviour that had never before been recorded.

Pike, represented by the Thomas's Lecture Agency of Strand, London, was a popular speaker on wildlife subjects and lectured all over the United Kingdom. He was opposed to the egg collecting, shooting and other blood sports. He joined the Royal Photographic Society in 1907 and gained his Fellowship the same year. He was made an Honorary Fellow in 1957. He exhibited and lectured extensively at the Society. Some 300 prints, negatives and lantern-slides of his work, which were acquired from the London Natural History Society in 1974, are preserved in the RPS Collection at the National Media Museum in Bradford, along with one of his early cameras. He also donated several of his films to the BFI National Archive. He died in Leighton Buzzard in 1963.

== Memorial ==
A local blue plaque for Oliver Pike, co-sponsored by Southgate District Civic Trust and Enfield Grammar School was unveiled on 16 November 2014 by his grandsons Jonathan and Richard Dollimore at 96 Green Dragon Lane, Winchmore Hill, his family home from 1882 to 1914.

== Bibliography ==
- In Birdland With Field Glass and Camera (1900)
- Home Life in Bird-land (1905)
- Birdland Pictures (1906)
- Adventures in Bird-land (1907)
- Behind the Veil in Birdland (1908)
- Through Birdland Byways with Pen and Camera (1910)
- Farther Afield in Birdland (1912)
- The Scout's Book of Birds (1914)
- Bird Biographies and other Bird Sketches (1915)
- Birdland's Little People (1919)
- Birdland Stories for Young People (1921)
- More Stories from Birdland (1924)
- Picture Stories From Birdland (1925)
- Rambles in Britain's Birdland (1930)
- Birdland Stories for Young People (1922)
- Birdland for Young People (1923; a reissue, in one volume, of Birdland's Little People and Birdland Stories)
- Picture Stories from Birdland (1925)
- The Great Winding Road (1928)
- Rambles in Britain's Birdland (1930)
- The Nightingale (1932)
- Nature and Camera: Summing Up Fifty Years' Experience of Photographing Flora and Fauna (The Focal Press, 1943)
- Nature's Wonderland (1945)
- Nature and My Cine Camera (1946)

=== Articles ===
- Pike, Oliver G (5 October 1907). "Battles in the Air, Part 1 of 2". Boy's Own Paper.
- Pike, Oliver G (12 October 1907). "Battles in the Air, Part 2 of 2". Boy's Own Paper.
- "The Playful Otter" in John R. Crossland, The Children's New Illustrated Encyclopedia. Collins, 1948. pp. 332–335.
- Pike, Oliver G (Winter 1951). "Early Bird Photography". Bird Notes. XXV (1). Royal Society for the Protection of Birds: 21–22, 25.
- Six chapters in Crossland, John R.; Parrish, J.M. (eds.). Britain's Wonderland of Nature. Collins.

== Films ==
- In Birdland (1907)
- St Kilda, Its People and Its Birds (1908)
- Secrets of Nature: The Cuckoo's Secret (1922)
- Wisdom of the Wild (1940)
- The Life of the Rabbit (1945)
- Plants and Animals Living Together (1950)

=== DVD ===
The Cuckoo's Secret is available on the BFI DVD Secrets of Nature, released in 2010.
