= W. Watson and Son =

W. Watson and Sons Ltd.
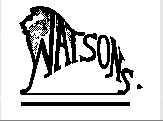
- Formerly: William Watson (established 1837); W. Watson & Son (c. 1868); W. Watson & Sons (c. 1883)
- Type: Private limited company (from 1908)
- Industry: Manufacturing
- Predecessor: John Browning & Co. (purchased 1900)
- Founded: 1837 (as William Watson)
- Founder: William Watson
- Headquarters: London, England
- Key people: William Watson (Founder; d. 1881); Charles Henry Watson (Joined c. 1883; d. 1938)

W. Watson and Son was an optical instrument maker. In 1837, the William Watson business was established in London for the manufacture of optical instruments. By the 1840s, the company moved into lanterns, slides and associated equipment. In 1868, the name was changed to W. Watson & Son and by this time were located at 313 High Holborn, London. In the 1870s, the company added photographic equipment and became known as a leading manufacturer of the Highest Class Photographic Instruments and Apparatus in England. Into the 1940s, the company remained at 313 High Holborn.

== W. Watson and Sons ==
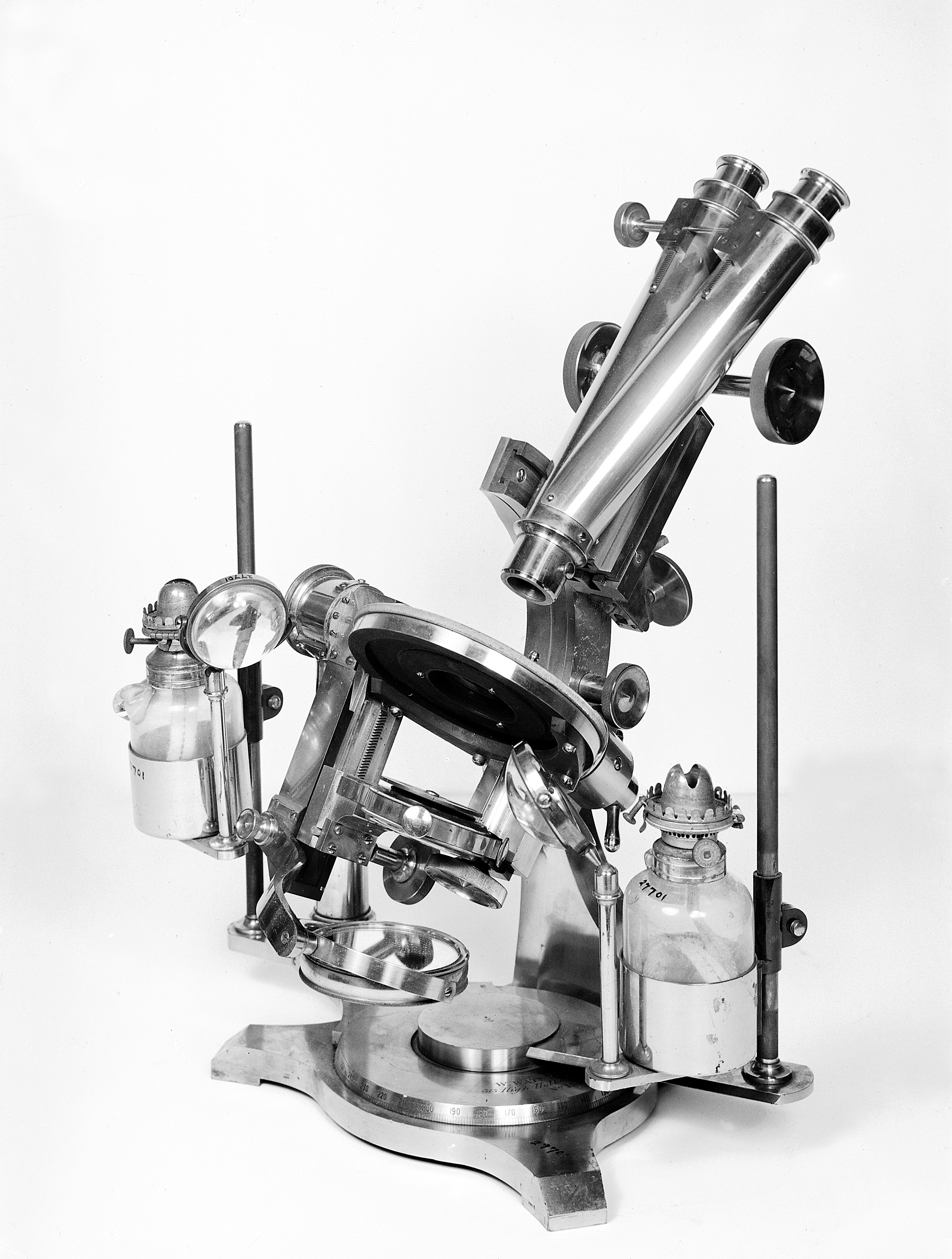
Microscope described as "modern" in 1888.

On 9 January 1881 William Watson died. In 1883, the name of the company was changed to W. Watson & Sons as the son, Charles Henry Watson joined the business. The 1883 Kelly's Business Directory listed both Charles Henry Watson and Henry Watson as associated with the Watson & Sons company located at 23 Walton Street, Aylesbury, England. In 1889, the company participated in the formation of a Photographic Trades Section of the London Chamber of Commerce. In 1894, the company exhibited scientific instruments at the Antwerp Exhibition.

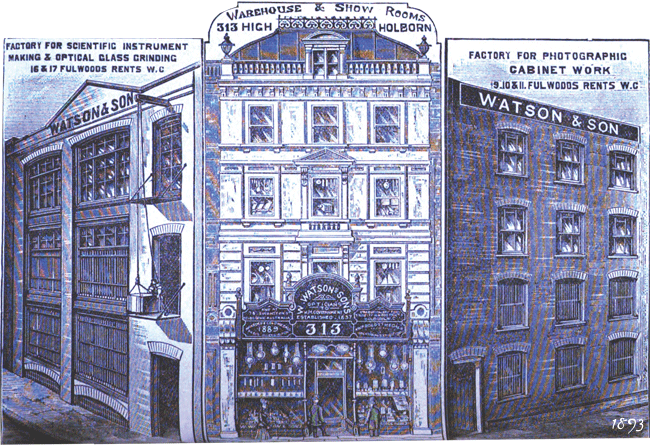
The company's premises in High Holborn 1891

In the 1890s, the business continued to grow and advertised in catalogues their factories for instruments, optical glass and cabinet work located at Fullwood Rents W.C. The warehouse and show room remained at 313 High Holborn. In 1900, W. Watson & Sons purchased the John Browning & Co. In 1903, a section in the journal Knowledge lists an assortment of equipment available from the company: microscopes, astronomical telescopes (educational model for £5 1s), Crookes' spinthariscope (pocket model for £1 1s), and Electro-Therapeutics apparatus that included complete outfits for radiography from £30. The company also offered Finsen-type lamps.

== W. Watson and Sons Ltd. ==
In 1908, the firm became W. Watson & Sons Ltd. On 10 August 1938, Charles Henry Watson died. In 1912, the company employed their equipment and demonstrated the utilization of alternating current electricity to enhance the growth of plants in a nursery near London. In 1929, an advertisement in the British Industries Fair Catalogue announced an Optical, Scientific and Photographic Exhibit. The exhibition featured manufacturers of microscopes for medical, industrial, and educational purposes and for the amateur, prism binoculars, astronomical and portable telescopes, photographic lenses and cameras, surveying and measuring instruments, photometers, and scientific apparatus of every description. The W. Watson & Son company exhibited in the Scientific Section at Stand No. N.24. In 1947, the firm was a Listed Exhibitor at the British Industries Fair. The Fair featured manufacturers of microscopes for all purposes and auxiliary optical and mechanical accessories. The company offered photometers, telescopes, prism binoculars, photographic lenses of all types, and optical elements in every form. W. Watson & Son exhibited in the Olympia Room, Ground Floor at Stand No. A.1020.

The company was also engaged c1930 to produce three prototype cipher typewriters designed and patented by Morgan O'Brien for evaluation by the military.

== Medical electrology and radiology ==
In January 1905, the display of apparatus at the Annual Meeting and Exhibition of the British Electrotherapeutic Society was quite remarkable. Those in attendance were treated to items and displays of much interest, several items on display for the first time. High frequency apparatus was featured to a lesser extent than shown in previous years, but appliances for X-ray work were plentiful. Excerpt from the Exhibit handbook follows:

- W. Watson & Sons (313, High Holborn, W.C.).

"showed Protective X-ray Gloves of a useful type, made of opaque flexible material, and very convenient for practical use; also an X-ray tube with a special arrangement of electrodes for improving the quality of the X-rays when operated with a coil by diverting the inverse impulses of the field of action. It is claimed that, with one of tubes, a high potential transformer can be employed direct in X-ray work without the need for any valve tube or other " rectifying " device. The anode, or second terminal, is at a distance from the antikathode, and is so placed in the tube that when the current is in the reverse direction its bombardment is directed into a depression at the back of the antikathode where it is innocuous."

== Exhibition of 1905 ==
Other companies that attended the Annual Meeting and Exhibition of the British Electrotherapeutic Society in January 1905:

- Harry W. Cox, Limited at 1A, Rosebery Avenue, W.C.
- A.E. Dean at 82, Hatton Garden, E.C.
- The Medical Supply Association at 228, Gray's Inn Road, W.C.
- Leslie Miller at 93, Hatton Garden, E.C.
- Messrs. Newton & Co. at 3, Fleet Street, London
- Sanitas Electrical Co. at 33 and 7A., Soho Square
- Mr. Karl Friedrich Schall at 75, Cavendish Street, W.

== People linked to W. Watson and Son ==
- William Watson (c.1815–1881) – partner, 1868–1881
- George Watson (1857-after 1881) – partner, 1881
- Thomas Watson (1855–1897) – partner, 1890s–1897
- Charles Watson (1866–1938) – partner, 1930s–1938
- Harold Armytage Sanders (1867–1940) – employee, c.1881–1900
- Alexander Eugen Conrady (1866–1944) – scientific adviser and lens designer, c.1901–1917
- Harry Arthur Crowhurst (1868–1943) – employee, 1900s–1900
- G.P. Norman (fl.1890s–1900s) – employee, 1890s–1897
- Jasper Redfern (1871–1928) – photographer's apprentice, and later, agent, 1885–1895

== Known locations/addresses ==
- 1888–1958, business address at: 313 High Holborn, London WC1, England
- 1890, factory at: 9, 10, 11, 16, 17 Fulwood's Rents, London, England
- 1890–1891, branch office at: 251 Swanston Street, Melbourne, Victoria, Australia
- 1897–1901, business address at: 78 Swanston Street, Melbourne, Victoria, Australia
- 1901, business address at: 16 Forrest Road, Edinburgh, Midlothian, Scotland
- 1914–1939, factory at: Bell's Hill, High Barnet, Hertfordshire, England
- 1914, business address at: 184 Great Portland Street, London W, England
- 1939–1950, factory at: 25 West End Lane, Barnet, Hertfordshire, England
- 1959–1969, business address at: Barnet, Hertfordshire, England
