= RAF Carlisle =

Former RAF airfield in Cumbria, England

RAF Carlisle
- Near Kingstown, Carlisle, Cumbria in England

Site information
- Type: Royal Air Force flying station, later a maintenance unit
- Owner: Ministry of Defence
- Operator: Royal Air Force
- Controlled by: RAF Flying Training Command; RAF Maintenance Command
- Condition: Closed

Location
- Location in Cumbria RAF Carlisle (the United Kingdom)
- Coordinates: 54°55′37″N 02°57′37″W

Site history
- Built: 1936–1938
- In use: 1938–1996
- Fate: Sites sold for civilian use including residential use and Kingmoor Business Park.

Royal Air Force Carlisle or more simply RAF Carlisle (previously RAF Kingstown) is a former Royal Air Force station, now closed after being used for a variety of roles over a period of fifty eight years and formerly located 2 mi (3.2 km) north of Carlisle city centre in Cumbria, England.

The station was latterly the home of No. 14 Maintenance Unit and occupied the various sites originally used by RAF Kingstown's Elementary Flying Training School during the Second World War. The site was usually known both locally and within the RAF by its shortened form of 14 MU. The site had also served for a short period in the 1930s as a civilian municipal airport for the city of Carlisle, but proved to be underused and uneconomic.

The maintenance unit was located on the northern edge of Carlisle, just past the present Asda supermarket, and spread across several different sites. The smallest storage site of Harker was 0.7 km north east of RAF Kingstown and, together with Heathlands which was 0.5 km north, was on the opposite side on the A74 (now the M6). The largest site of Rockcliffe was 1.2 km north west and Cargo site was 1.5 km south west. The maintenance unit was used by the RAF to store and maintain various pieces of equipment ranging from aircraft engine parts to firearms, ammunition to office furniture, aircrew clothing and small hardware items.

Routine requests for items were dealt with by civilian warehousemen during normal working hours. At night a uniformed RAF Duty Officer dealt with urgent and essential "flash" requests from operational flying stations.

== History ==
=== Origins ===
In the early 1930s, the Carlisle County Borough Council opened Kingstown municipal airport. At that time it was outside the city boundaries, on the land that is today the Kingstown and Kingmoor Park industrial estates. This early airport was a typical 1930s grass field airstrip with no metalled runways. Although used by the Border Flying Club as its base, the new airport proved to be underused and uneconomic so the airfield was eventually sold to the Air Ministry in 1936.

The RAF installed concrete runways, hangars, a full range of administrative buildings, and several estates of married quarter housing for officers and other ranks. The new station opened for operations on 26 September 1938 as RAF Kingstown and became home to two operational bomber squadrons flying Fairey Battle bombers with three man crews.

=== The War years ===
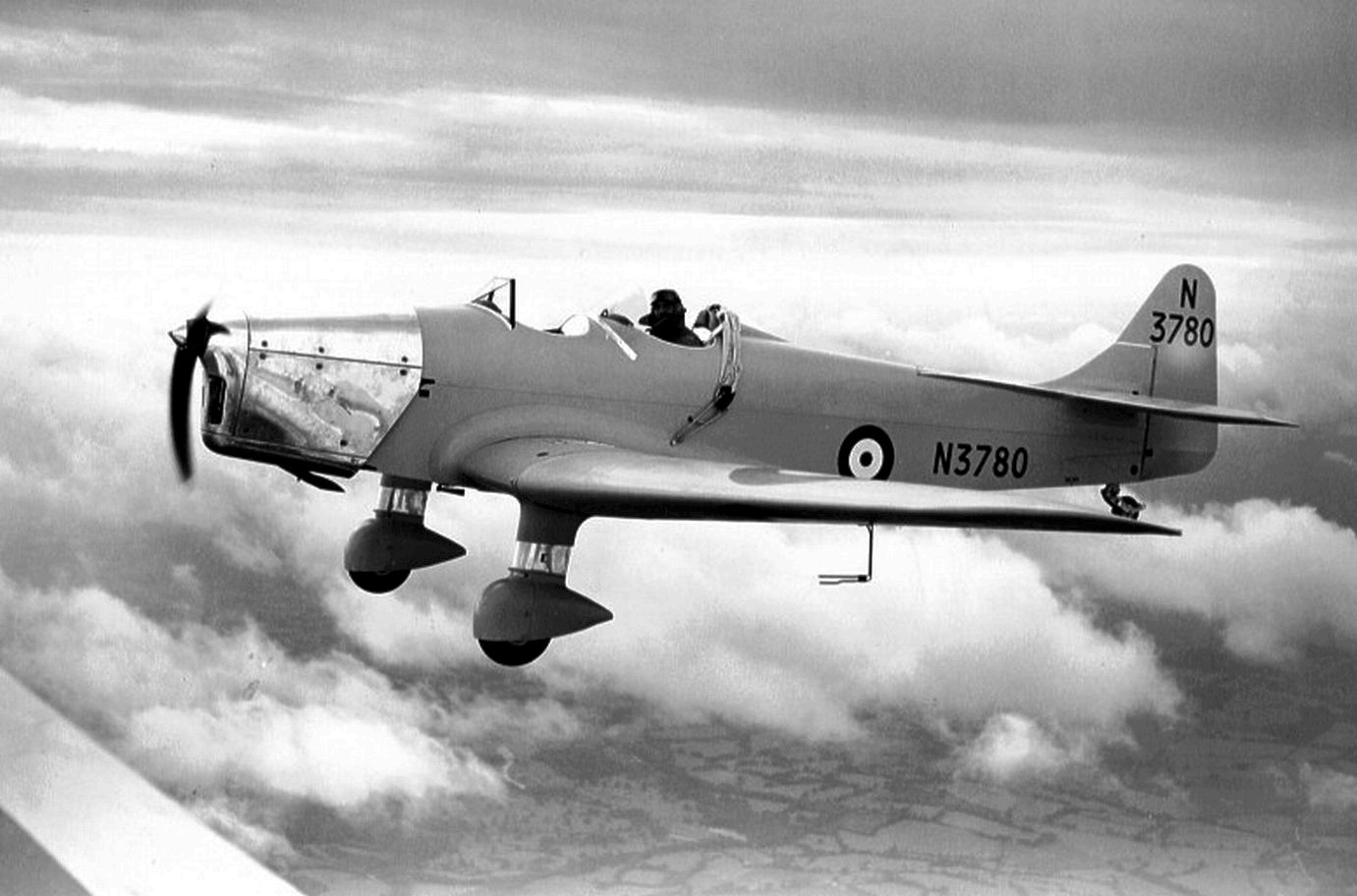
Miles Magister trainer

With the outbreak of war in 1939, Kingstown's runways proved too short for the latest generation of larger multi-engined bombers and there was no room for runway expansions, so the RAF built and developed a new airfield at Crosby-on-Eden. The new facility came into operation in February 1941, the station designated as RAF Crosby on Eden which, following its wartime service, today serves as Carlisle Lake District Airport. RAF Kingstown was retained by the RAF, and converted to No 24 Elementary Flying Training School (EFTS).

As the war developed and the need for pilots increased, the EFTS expanded its operations onto several local grass fields at nearby Harker, Heathlands, Rockcliffe and Cargo. There was even a satellite grass field at RAF Kirkpatrick just across the Scottish border, near Gretna Green. The main trainers used at the school were Tiger Moths and Miles Magisters. On 3 June 1940 a Fairey Battle was taken for an unauthorised flight by an unqualified pilot and crashed after several failed landing attempts; the aircraft was destroyed and the pilot killed.

In 1941 RAF Kingstown was re-designated as No. 15 Elementary Flying Training School RAF where new cadets would learn to be pilots. Also pilots who had already undergone basic flying training elsewhere were assessed for their suitability for conversion to either fighter or bomber operations. The station retained this function until the end of hostilities in 1945, when the base was closed and placed on a care and maintenance status.

The following units were also here at some point:

- No. 3 Air Observers Navigation School RAF
- No. 6 Anti-Aircraft Co-operation Unit RAF
- No. 38 Elementary and Reserve Flying Training School RAF
- No. 189 Gliding School RAF

=== Involved in a POW escape attempt ===
RAF Kingstown featured in one of the most audacious escape attempts by any German prisoners of war during World War Two. On 24 November 1941, two German pilots, held at POW Camp No 15 at Shap in a former hotel and now again the Shap Wells Hotel, escaped with flying jackets over their Luftwaffe uniforms and carrying forged identity documents that purported them to be Dutch airmen attached to the RAF.

They were fighter pilot Leutnant Heinz Schnabel from 1/JG3 Jagdstaffell and Heinkel bomber pilot Oberleutnant Harry Wappler from KG27. Without any apparent difficulty they entered RAF Kingstown and, with the help of an RAF ground mechanic, started up a Miles Magister trainer aircraft and took off. Short of fuel they landed at another RAF airfield and refuelled. Setting off for the Netherlands they suddenly realised the aircraft's range was insufficient and they turned back. Landing in a field near Great Yarmouth they were recaptured and taken to RAF Horsham St Faith. Returned to the Shap POW camp to spend 28 days in solitary, both airmen were then shipped to more secure confinement in Canada.

=== A change of use ===
During the 1950s the station was reactivated, re-designated as RAF Carlisle, and retasked as No 14 Maintenance Unit, the RAF's most northerly storage facility in England. The original RAF Kingstown site was established as the station headquarters and the runways were removed. The ballast from them was used in the foundations for a major building programme on the satellite sites of Harker, Heathlands, Rockcliffe and Cargo; hangars, storage buildings and administration offices were built there.

In 1957, RAF Carlisle became the parent administrative station to the new missile testing establishment at the nearby satellite station of RAF Spadeadam on the remote Cumberland moorland. Spadeadam no longer tests ballistic missiles and remains today as the RAF's electronic warfare training and testing range.

By the 1980s the headquarters site consisted of the original guard room staffed by civilian MOD Police, a helipad mainly used by the Royal Navy during aerial marine surveys of the Solway Firth, the small non-standard officers' mess with living accommodation for eight officers, the station HQ, the rifle range, a water tower, an MOD Fire Station with a single fire engine appliance and various other minor admin buildings. The station was unusual within the RAF as there were no other ranks or NCOs stationed at RAF Carlisle, only a small cadre of 12 - 15 RAF Supply Branch officers who controlled a civilian workforce of storekeepers and warehousemen.

RAF Carlisle was just one in a chain of several Maintenance Units forming RAF Support Command, later to become RAF Logistics Command in 1994. Logistics Command was faced with a contracting air force that had fewer airfields, fewer aircraft, and fewer personnel. The logical answer was a reduction in the number of maintenance units. 14 MU was the farthest flung location in the UK, now isolated with most northern RAF stations already closed. RAF Carlisle would prove to be an early target for closure in the Strategic Defence Review (SDR) which marked the beginning of a modernisation that moved towards a unified tri-service logistics support.

=== Final closure ===
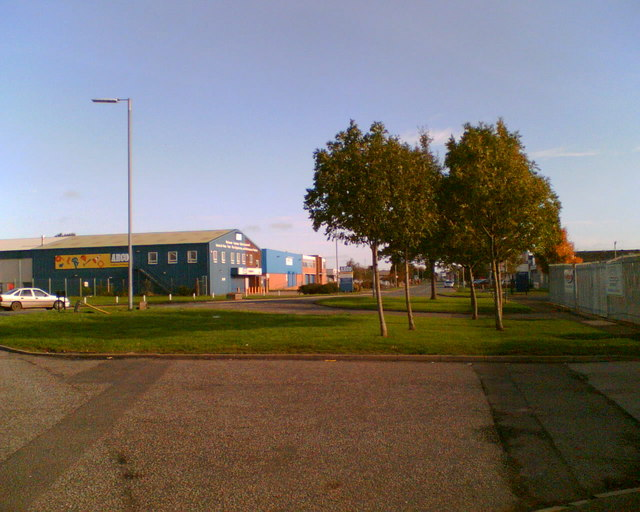
Kingstown Industrial Estate, just south of the main RAF Carlisle headquarters site and located on land where the main runway of RAF Kingstown stood until the 1950s

After three years of closure threats by the Ministry of Defence and extended negotiations with Carlisle Council, the RAF Carlisle base was finally closed in September 1996, and stood unused for several years. The site was eventually bought by a local entrepreneur and businessman, Brian Scowcroft, who made a sizeable investment developing the site into the extensive regional business park known as Kingmoor Park, the role that continues today.

The main site is as much the hub of operations today as it was when it was in RAF service. It houses the site admin blocks, many local businesses have converted hangars into workshops, several national and international businesses have depots there. The helipad area disappeared under The Capita Group's new building, where Capita Business Services now operates various services for Cumbria County Council under tender for fifteen years. Capita Symonds also works out of the same building, where they develop computer software and act as consultants on highways, amongst other functions. The Cargo site has been cleared and a new residential housing estate is now under construction.

The stock of RAF Carlisle officers' and other ranks' married-quarter housing was sold originally to Carlisle City Council and is now almost completely owner-occupied. The last "gate guardian" aircraft at RAF Carlisle was the Phantom FGR2 No XV406, ex 64 Sqn/228OCU at Leuchars. After RAF Carlisle was closed, this aircraft was transferred to the Solway Aviation Museum at Carlisle Lake District Airport where it still stands. Other "gate guardians" at RAF Carlisle have included a Gloster Meteor NF14, a Vampire T11 and a Hawker Hunter F1.

=== Radioactive contamination ===
During 1992 radioactive radium was discovered at the RAF Carlisle site by accident when a member of the Royal Observer Corps walked across a patch of ground testing a recently recalibrated PDRM82 geiger counter. After further investigations it was realised that the RAF had incinerated thousands of luminous dials from the old wartime trainer aircraft in accordance with the disposal policy of the 1940s and 1950s known as "bash, bury or burn". The resulting radioactive ash had been scattered and used during later landscaping of the site.

The radioactive ash had also been used as packing around fence posts on the airfield boundary. Hotspots of up to 250,000 Bq of radioactivity were identified where unburnt dials had been abandoned in piles on the ground. Such levels would be harmful inside the body and could burn the skin in hours.

Since 1992, scientists have analysed up to 10,000 soil samples from the closed RAF Carlisle site and so far have published thirty separate reports. Over three hundred cubic metres of soil contaminated with radium-226 at levels of at least 4 becquerels per gram were condemned as radioactive waste and transported to the low-level waste dump run by Low Level Waste Repositorory near Drigg. Up to twice that volume of less radioactive soils have been tipped onto nearby industrial waste sites.

== Royal Observer Corps, Carlisle Group ==
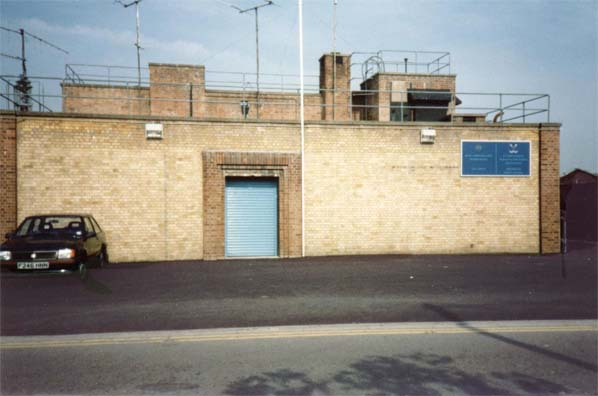
A Royal Observer Corps standard surface nuclear bunker of the type built at RAF Carlisle

During the Second World War the air raid warning organisation No 32 Group Carlisle Royal Observer Corps operated from a city centre building on Norfolk Road, The Laurels, although it was controlled administratively from RAF Kingstown. The association with Kingstown developed further in 1962 when the ROC ceased its aircraft spotting role for the RAF and took on a new role of plotting nuclear explosions and warning the public of approaching radioactive fallout for the UKWMO. A new administration building and a protected, hardened Nuclear Reporting bunker was built at RAF Carlisle. The nuclear bunker was a standard above-ground structure and both the bunker and Headquarters hutting stood on a separate site at Crindledyke just outside the main gates of RAF Carlisle and roughly opposite the station's officers mess. The Carlisle group was redesignated no 22 Group ROC.

The ROC also constructed a smaller nuclear reporting post called Kingstown post (OS ref:NY 3837 5920), on the main RAF Carlisle site. The post was also an underground protected bunker but designed for a crew of three observers. The headquarters bunker accommodated an operational crew of around 100 with dormitory and canteen facilities included with the operations room and life support plant.

The Royal Observer Corps and its parent organisation the United Kingdom Warning and Monitoring Organisation were stood down in December 1995 after the end of the Cold War and as a result of recommendations in the governments Options for Change review of UK defence. The ROC buildings were demolished in 1996 and replaced by a cellphone communications mast. The foundations of the nuclear bunker can still be partially seen outlined in the concreted yard, which also contains the Air Training Corps hut during recent further development of the site.

== Continuing RAF links ==
The Royal Air Force still retains close links with the local area, through RAF Spadeadam, the only electronic warfare range still in the UK and one of two in Europe, which holds an annual thanksgiving service in Carlisle Cathedral on Battle of Britain Sunday.

Other links with the area are No. 1862 (City of Carlisle) Squadron, Air Training Corps, based near the redundant station, the Carlisle and District Branch of the Royal Air Forces Association and the Royal Observer Corps Association (22 Group Chapter).
