= Avooma Airlines =

British regional airline

- Founded: 29 July 2020 (as Lakeland Airways Limited)
- Focus cities: Belfast; Hannover
- Headquarters: London Southend Airport
- Key people: Jon Davies (CVO)
- Website: flyavooma.com

Avooma Airlines (UK) Limited, trading as Avooma, is a proposed British regional airline which aims to begin operations to destinations within the United Kingdom and Europe using a fleet of ATR 72 turboprop aircraft.

== History ==
=== Founding ===
The airline was founded in July 2020 as Lakeland Airways, and on 11 March 2021 announced plans to begin operations from Carlisle Lake District Airport to "key cities within the UK and Ireland" and later add services to continental Europe, with Dublin cited as a potential early destination.

The airline's founder Jon Davies said at the time that, "Initially it would be a small operation, grown organically based on demand. We would hope to fly to the places that locals want to fly to and we would also hope to promote Carlisle and the Lake District, which will be a popular staycation destination."

In a 2021 interview with the Cumbria Business Podcast, Davies said that Lakeland Airways initially looked to operate as a virtual airline before targeting its own Air Operator's Certificate, but is now expected to begin operations as a fully-licensed carrier owing to post-Brexit complications and the resulting lack of available ACMI capacity. In the same interview, Davies said that the airline was "currently working towards starting [in] March 2022" but stressed that this date was not in any way guaranteed.

It was later revealed that Lakeland Airways had intended to charter 19-seat aircraft for its services, but that delays in agreeing the lease from an EU operator meant that the contract was unable to be signed before the end of the Brexit transition period, meaning that the airline's proposed operation became non-compliant with CAA regulations.

In 2023 Carlisle Airport would lose its commercial licence owing to concerns that it was "not economically viable." Lakeland Airways would therefore go on to move its registered office address to Blackpool the same year.

=== Rebranding as Avooma Airlines ===
In January 2024, Lakeland Airways was rebranded as Avooma, with a new corporate identity having been designed for the company by Liven Creative. On launching the new brand, the airline said that "Avooma is a propulsive name that gives off a vibe of assured efficiency. Our aim is to provide affordable, daily, non-stop scheduled flights to destinations across the UK & Europe."

According to Liven Creative, the Avooma name "plays on the concept of getting passengers from Point “A” at the start of their journey, back to Point “a” at the end (i.e., home)", and is also derived from the word 'vroom'.

=== Acquisition of beregional ===
In July 2024, Avooma merged with start-up airline beregional, a proposed carrier which was claimed to be a continuation of the defunct Flybe brand.

In a press release, Avooma said that the merger would "[enhance] regional connectivity across the UK", with the combined entity to be based in Blackpool and operate under the Avooma brand, though the company would go on to move its registered office to London Southend Airport in September 2024.

=== Recent developments ===
In August 2024, the airline released a new website, saying that "Our goal is to ensure a smooth & user-friendly experience that caters to everyone."

The following month, Avooma's registered office was moved to an address at London Southend Airport, though the airline is yet to comment publicly on the relocation.

On 6 February 2025, Avooma Airlines announced an exclusive collaboration agreement with US manufacturer The AirCraft Company, which is developing the Pangea family of 30- and 52-seat hybrid-electric regional aircraft. At the same time, it announced the appointment of Cianan Kelly as its chief strategy and sustainability officer. Kelly would remain with the airline until May 2025, when he decided to focus on projects elsewhere within regional transportation.

== Corporate affairs ==
The company's head office is at the London Southend Jet Centre at London Southend Airport, situated east of London within the county of Essex.

Avooma is listed as a client on the website of Lagniappe Aviation, a US company which refers to itself as a "full-service consulting and advisory firm."

=== Company values ===
Avooma Airlines operates with a focus on three core values, which it calls "People", "Places", and "the Planet".

== Destinations ==
Though Avooma has not yet published details of its network, it is known to have been in discussions with Northern Irish start-up FlyAtlantic according to an interview with that airline's CEO, Andrew Pyne, conducted in July 2023. In the interview, Pyne mentioned that Avooma could provide a feeder operation for FlyAtlantic.

This feeder network would see Avooma operating from a base at Belfast International to 20 UK and Irish airports including the Isle of Man, Jersey, and London-City. It was said that Avooma would operate for FlyAtlantic in a similar manner to how Emerald Airlines operates on behalf of Aer Lingus.

In a February 2025 interview, Avooma's chief strategy and sustainability officer reported that the airline intends to serve 10 destinations in the UK and Europe in the months immediately following its launch, and that these would include 2 routes to Hannover.

== Fleet ==
Avooma Airlines has released images of its colour scheme on an ATR 72 aircraft carrying the registration G-SENA.

The airline has reported that it intends to take delivery of its first ATR 72-600 in mid-2026, with two further aircraft to follow ahead of its commercial launch in early 2027.

Avooma Airlines proposed fleet
Aircraft type	In service	On order	Notes
ATR 72-600	-	3	For delivery from 2026

=== Hybrid-electric aircraft ===
The airline has an exclusive collaboration agreement in place with The AirCraft Company which will see it "explore the opportunity to advance the decarbonisation of regional aviation" using the manufacturer's Pangea family of hybrid-electric aircraft.

=== Other types ===
Avooma has stated that it also intends to operate a "hybrid-electric sub-19-seat type" for which orders are to be announced in 2025.
