= Carlisle Lake District Airport =

Airport in Cumbria, England

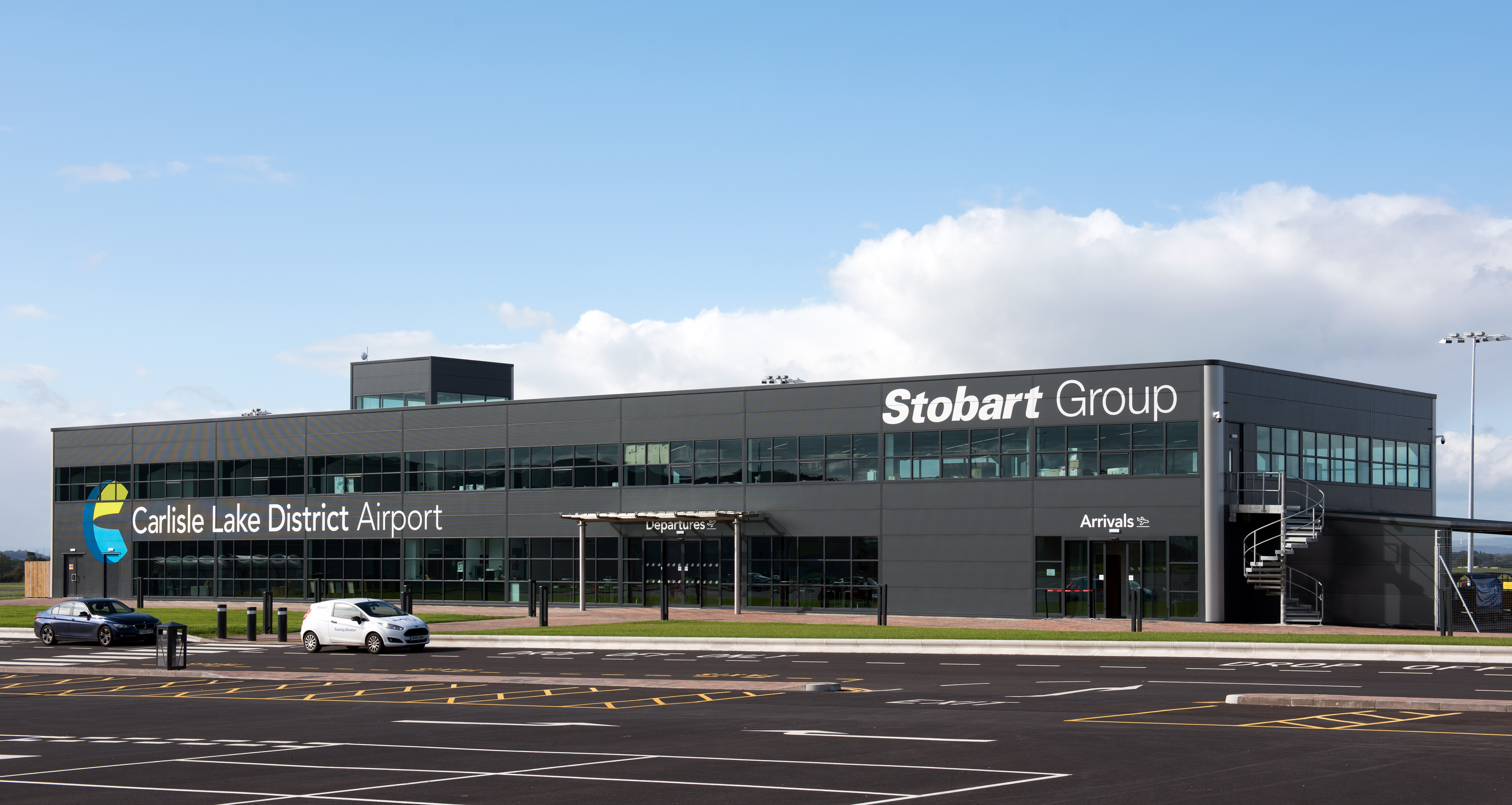
- IATA: CAX; ICAO: EGNC

Summary
- Airport type: Private
- Owner: A W Jenkinson
- Operator: A W Jenkinson
- Location: Irthington, Cumbria, England
- Opened: 1941
- Elevation AMSL: 190 ft (58 m)
- Coordinates: 54°56′15″N 002°48′33″W
- Website: www.carlisleairport.co.uk

Map
- Location in Cumbria, England Location in the former Carlisle district, Cumbria

Runways
Direction	Length		Surface
Direction	m	ft	Surface
01/19	938	3,077	Asphalt
06/24	1,837	6,027	Asphalt

Statistics (2021)
- Passengers: 0
- Passenger change 20–21: ▼100.0%
- Aircraft movements: 0
- Movements change 20–21: ▼100.0%
- Sources: UK AIP at NATS; Statistics from the UK Civil Aviation Authority

Carlisle Lake District Airport (IATA: CAX, ICAO: EGNC) is a small airport located 6 miles (10 km) north-east of Carlisle, England on a plain near the River Irthing.

Originally opened as an RAF base in 1941, it came under government ownership in the 1960s before being sold to Haughey Airports in 2000 which was later purchased and rebranded as Stobart Air Limited. Stobart Group purchased Carlisle Airport in May 2009 for £9.9 million and constructed a £12 million freight distribution centre. In July 2019, a new terminal was opened that briefly connected Carlisle with commercial flights to Belfast, Dublin & London but due to the COVID-19 pandemic, commercial flights ceased operating in April 2020.

Since its partial re-opening post COVID-19, it now operates unlicensed and welcomes general aviation aircraft, as well as being host to several military exercises throughout the year. There is Avgas, JetA1 and F34 fuel available during operating hours.

The airport has been the location for some prehistoric excavations. It also hosts the Solway Aviation Museum. Since 2024, it has been owned and operated by forest products company A.W. Jenkinson.

== History ==
=== RAF Crosby-on-Eden ===
In the early 1930s, the City of Carlisle County Borough Council opened Kingstown Municipal Airport, at the time outside the borough boundaries which later became RAF Kingstown and is now Kingstown and Kingmoor industrial estates and business parks. With the outbreak of war in 1939, RAF Kingstown's runway was too small for bombers, so the Royal Air Force developed a new airstrip at Crosby-on-Eden to the east of Carlisle, on the line of the Stanegate Roman road. The new facility came into operation in February 1941 for training operations, designating the station RAF Crosby-on-Eden.

Originally housing No. 59 Operational Training Unit, the station provided day training for Hawker Hurricane pilots, which was replaced by No. 9 OTU, 17 Group, Coastal Command in August 1942, for training long-range fighter crews on Bristol Beaufort and Bristol Beaufighter conversion squadrons, as well as air firing and night flying. In August 1944 the station came under the command of 109 OTU, a transport command of Douglas Dakotas. The station was renamed 1383 TCU on 1 August 1945. However, the station had no postwar use or need, and was closed in 1947 with the airfield returning to Carlisle City Council to continue as a municipal airport.

=== Purchase by the local authorities ===
In 1960 Cumberland County Council purchased the site and renamed it Carlisle Airport. After a short refurbishment programme it was licensed in 1961 for training purposes and civilian flights to destinations including London, the Channel Islands, Belfast and the Isle of Man. In 1968 the airport was transferred to Carlisle City Council. Most of the original RAF structures remain intact today, although a lack of investment and maintenance has restricted much of the perimeter road, as well as shortening and weight restricting the runways.

During the early 1980s Carlisle Airport was used by Specialist Flight Training to train military pilots in helicopters and fixed wing aircraft. Notably, the training of Iraqi pilots for the Iran-Iraq War was a key part of the programme. Specialist Flight Training had at least seven Aérospatiale Gazelle helicopters together with at least two NDN Firecracker fixed wing aircraft. The trainee pilots had a reputation locally for being slightly reckless with various incidents occurring during the period that Specialist Flight Training were operational at the airport.

In 1997, the council agreed to extend the runway to allow Boeing 737s to land into a new air-cargo hub, but the proposal collapsed.

=== Sale to Haughey Airports ===
As the airport had lost £3.5 million on operations between 1979 and 1994, Carlisle City Council agreed to sell the airport on a 150-year lease to Haughey Airports in 2000. The company was owned by Northern Irish entrepreneur Edward Haughey, who owned nearby Corby Castle in Cumbria. Haughey invested £4 million in infrastructure improvements but, whilst promising to provide additional facilities and enhancements to the site for the Solway Aviation Museum, he sold the airfield to WA Developments Limited in 2006 before achieving this.

=== Esken ownership (formerly Stobart Group) ===
On 7 April 2006, Haughey Airports was acquired by WA Developments, which had acquired Eddie Stobart Ltd. in February 2004. Haughey Airports Ltd was renamed Stobart Air Ltd and a sub-division within WA Developments called Stobart Air was formed. The airport was then re-branded Carlisle Lake District Airport.

Following WA Developments' decision to merge Eddie Stobart with the property and ports company the Westbury Property Fund on 15 August 2007 and to list it on the London Stock Exchange as the Stobart Group, Carlisle Lake District Airport initially remained within the ownership of WA Developments, through its subsidiary Stobart Air Holdings. On 10 March 2008, the Stobart Group entered into a £50,000 option, expiring in July 2008, to acquire Carlisle Lake District Airport from Stobart Air Holdings for £15 million (£2.5 million in cash and £12.5 million in new Stobart Group shares). This option was extended in July 2008 until January 2009 for a further £50,000.

In January 2009, Stobart Group's subsidiary, Stobart Airports Ltd, exercised its option to acquire Carlisle Lake District Airport from Stobart Air Holdings for £14 million (£1 million less than originally announced). Following an independent shareholder vote, the acquisition was completed on 30 May 2009, and the purchase price was reduced to £9.9 million due to a fall in the value of Stobart Group shares.

Between December 2014 and September 2015, a £12 million freight distribution centre was built on the south-eastern corner of the site, which is now leased to Eddie Stobart Logistics. Stobart Group also intended to build a further warehousing and distribution hub from 2017 on land adjacent to the freight distribution centre. After financial assistance from the Cumbria Local Enterprise Partnership, there were plans for passenger flights from June 2018 "to major tourism and business hubs including London, Dublin and Belfast" but the target date was postponed. On 4 July 2019 the new terminal was officially opened, and the first scheduled passenger flights since 1993 were commenced by Loganair to Belfast–City, Dublin, London–Southend until 2021.

==== Esken (Stobart Group) redevelopment plans timeline ====
Under Stobart Group ownership between 2006 and 2009, some development was planned for Carlisle Lake District Airport which would have seen the introduction of freight and passenger services in the future, along with the resurfacing of the existing runway to accept larger aircraft as part of a £21 million development. Plans were announced to redevelop the airport site to include a new passenger terminal, an air freight service, a new headquarters for Eddie Stobart, and a 750,000-square-foot (70,000 m^{2}) distribution centre. Ryanair also expressed an interest in using the completed airport as a hub.

In 2008, controversy emerged surrounding the proposed developments to Carlisle Lake District Airport. In response to 63 apparently overly restrictive planning conditions placed on the development plans of Stobart Air,

On 7 October, at the Cumbria Tourist Board's AGM, he confirmed that work at the airport would have begun early 2010 and hoped that flights to Paris, Belfast and Dublin would be in operation by 2011.

In 2010, Stobart Air submitted proposals to build a 394,000 sq ft (36,600 m^{2}) Air Freight Distribution Centre on the site. Under the plans, Eddie Stobart Logistics would relocate all its Carlisle depots to the airport, and there would be passenger flights to and from London Southend Airport, operated by Aer Arann which would base an ATR 42 aircraft at Carlisle. Further details on jobs and flights were supplied in support of the application in July 2011.

In 2012, Stobart Air was given permission by Carlisle City Council to develop the airport under these proposals. These included the raising and reprofiling of the main runway at the airport. The warehousing contracts would deliver the rental income required to help upgrade the airport facilities and allow passenger flights to commence. Aer Arann identified that passenger routes from Carlisle to Dublin and the Stobart-owned London Southend Airport would be sustainable."

Planning approval was subsequently overturned in the High Court in March 2014. On 19 March 2014, Aer Arann changed its name to Stobart Air. Following a change in the law which no longer required Stobart Air to prove that the airport would have to be viable, planning permission was re-granted on 18 August 2014. No application for a judicial review was received and work started on 3 December 2014. This was completed on 7 September 2015.

This first development covers 19 acres (7.7 ha), and this site was sold to the real estate investment fund Gramercy Europe for £16.925 million in February 2016.

In 2015, Brampton and Beyond Energy Ltd (BABE) in conjunction with Stobart Energy announced plans to build a £1.5 million anaerobic digester renewable energy plant on a piece of woodland to the west of the site by 2018.

In 2016, Stobart Group announced it was developing 21 acres (8.5 ha) of land adjacent to its existing Air Freight Distribution Centre in an area to be called Eden Park. Eden Park will consist of industrial warehouse and distribution buildings ranging in size from 15,000 sq ft (1,400 m^{2}) to 330,000 sq ft (31,000 m^{2}), and is being marketed as of 2017.

=== Lakeland Airways ===
Start-up airline Lakeland Airways attempted to establish flights from Carlisle in 2021, but later moved its base to Blackpool following the revocation of the airport's commercial licence. The airline would be rebranded as Avooma in 2024.

=== A W Jenkinson ===
In May 2024, the new owners A W Jenkinson announced their plans for the airport.

== Business operations ==
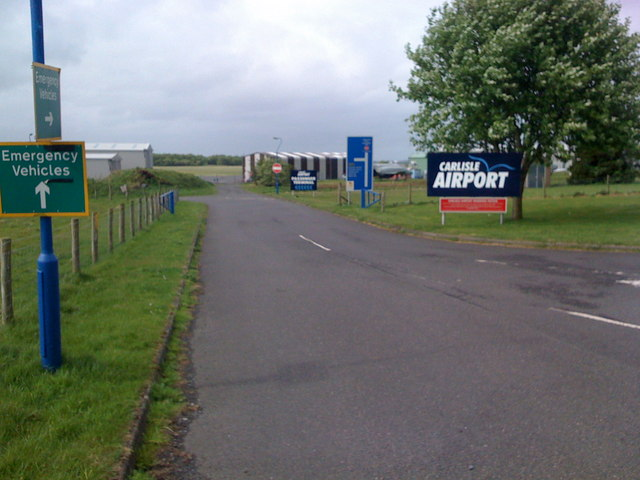
Original Carlisle Lake District Airport entrance

Carlisle Lake District Airport covers 460 acres (190 ha), of which 212 acres (86 ha) are used for airport-related activities, and the balance of 248 acres (100 ha) is in the process of being developed for logistics and aviation-related activities.

Its main activity presently provides facilities for flight training and sightseeing flights. The airport is host to these businesses: Carlisle Flight Training and Aero Club, Border Air Training and Northumbria Helicopters.

Solway Aviation Museum occupies a small part of the site.

ECM (Vehicle Delivery Service) Ltd has its HQ at the airport.

In August 2020, during the COVID-19 pandemic in the United Kingdom, part of the site was used as a Coronavirus test facility.

== Military operations ==
Although not present during the COVID-19 pandemic between 2020 and 2022, the Royal Netherlands Air Force has been holding their annual low flying exercise "Tac Blaze" over the nearby RAF Spadeadam range while based at the airport since 2006. The exercise involves around 400 personnel and aims at training the Dutch Defense Helicopter Command's aircrew and Airmobile Brigade flying missions day and night, over hilly terrain and against real threat systems using Eurocopter AS532 Cougar, Boeing AH-64 Apache and Boeing CH-47 Chinook helicopters.

== Passenger movements ==
Traffic statistics at Carlisle Lake District Airport
Year	Passengers handled		Aircraft movements		Freight (tonnes)	
Year	Number	% change	Number	% change	Number	% change
2010	0	Steady	18,419	Steady	0	Steady
2011	0	Steady	14,911	▼19.0	0	Steady
2012	0	Steady	17,349	▲16.4	0	Steady
2013	0	Steady	17,280	▼0.4	0	Steady
2014	0	Steady	16,427	▼4.9	0	Steady
2015	0	Steady	18,427	▲12.2	0	Steady
2016	0	Steady	19,826	▲7.6	0	Steady
2017	0	Steady	17,439	▼12.0	0	Steady
2018	0	Steady	4,330	▼75.2	0	Steady
2019	8,257	Steady	14,421	▲233.0	0	Steady
2020	2,460	▼70.2	1,501	▼89.6	0	Steady
2021	0	▼100.0	0	▼100.0	0	Steady
2022	0	Steady	0	Steady	0	Steady

== Commercial service history ==
Although regular scheduled flights from the airport have operated, few have been commercially viable leading to a series of failed operations:

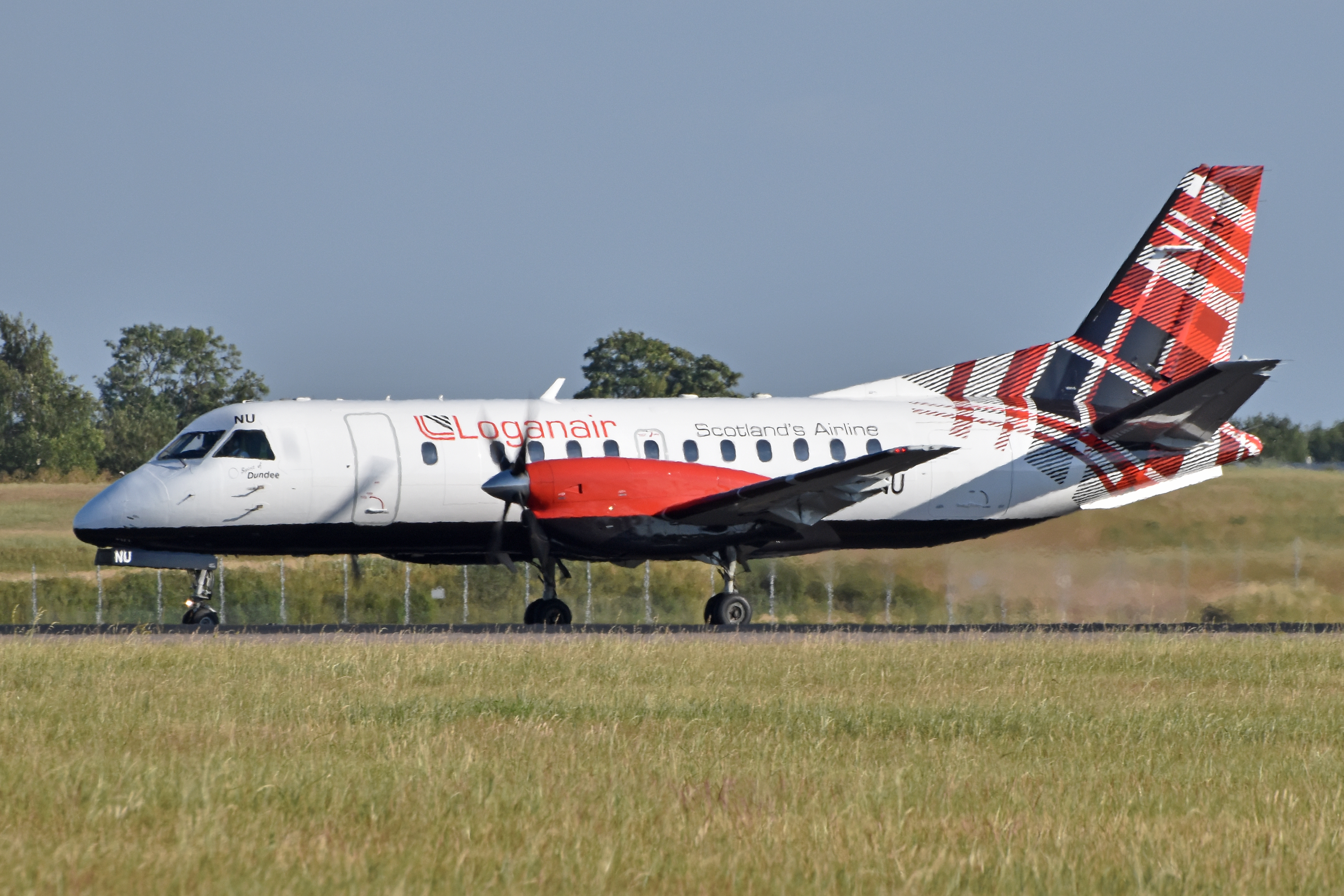
Loganair operated Saab 340 aircraft similar to the one pictured from Carlisle.

- In 1946 after World War II, British European Airways commenced flights to Isle of Man and Belfast–International, but these stopped in 1947.
- In 1961 BKS Air Transport operated a service to Leeds/Bradford.
- In 1967 Autair started a service to London, using London–Luton at first, then London–Heathrow. They also operated a summer service to Jersey. In 1969 they stopped all their schedules and changed their name to Court Line.
- In 1978 British Nuclear Fuels began flying nuclear material to customers in the UK and Europe, but this was stopped shortly after coming to media attention, only to recommence in 1987.
- In 1982 Air Ecosse started flights to Scotland (Aberdeen, Glasgow, Dundee), and London–Heathrow, followed a year later for two summer seasons only to the Isle of Man. After the collapse of Air Ecosse in 1985, its routes ceased and only the route to London continued, being run for two years by EuroAir.
- In 1985 Viking began flights to Jersey as a charter operation but the following year operated as a schedule by BAF until October 1987.
- In 1987 Air Furness briefly revived Isle of Man flights until July 1988.
- In December 1988, Pan Am operated a Boeing 727 charter flight from London–Heathrow, bringing grieving relatives to the scene of the Pan Am Flight 103 crash site at the nearby town of Lockerbie.
- In 1993 New Air started a London service to London–Stansted, but collapsed two months later. Lakeside Northwest continued the service until the end of the year, but also collapsed.
- In 1994 Northumberland-based Geordie Air Travel never got off the ground.
- In 1995 Lewis Holidays planned to run Saturday flights to Jersey, which never happened.
- In 1996 Cumbria County Council refused to give financial support to Belgian airline VLM Airlines for four flights per day to London City Airport.
- In 2020 Loganair suspended all scheduled flights from 27 March 2020 until further notice. In July 2020, it was confirmed by Carlisle Airport that Loganair had no plans to resume flights to and from Carlisle Airport

== Accidents and incidents ==
- On 17 October 1961, a BKS Air Transport Douglas Dakota G-AMVC crashed on a flight from Leeds Bradford International Airport to Carlisle as it approached the airport in low cloud, rain and strong winds. All four crew were killed.

== In popular culture ==
- Over the weekend of 14/15 May 2011 the airport was used by the BBC to hold the music festival Radio 1's Big Weekend, featuring headline acts such as Lady Gaga, My Chemical Romance and the Foo Fighters. An assortment of stages were assembled on site, including a main tent with a capacity of over 12,000 people.

== See also ==
- List of airports in the United Kingdom and the British Crown Dependencies
