= Irthington Castle =

Castle in Cumbria, England

- Irthington, England

Site information
- Type: Castle

Location
- Shown within Irthington city centre Irthington Castle (the United Kingdom)
- Coordinates: 54°56′45″N 2°46′59″W

Site history
- Materials: timber

Irthington Castle was a castle located near Irthington, Cumbria, England.

== History ==
The barony of Gilsland was granted to Hubert I de Vaux in 1157 by King Henry II of England. A timber motte and bailey castle was built by either Hubert or his son Robert. The castle was the Caput baroniae of the barony of Gilsland until the 14th century, with Ranulph de Dacre, Baron Dacre moving the caput to Naworth Castle in 1335.
