= Henry Armytage Sanders =

British photographer and cinematographer (1886-1936)

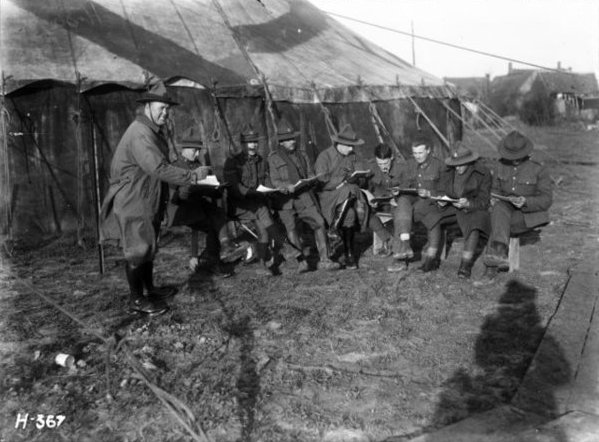
- Henry Armytage Sanders, shadow self-portrait, First World War
- Born: 24 May 1886; Leytonstone, London, England
- Died: 5 May 1936 (aged 49); Ploughley, Oxfordshire, England
- Spouse: Lilian Mary Sanders
- Military career
- Allegiance: United Kingdom
- Branch: British Army
- Service years: 1917-1919
- Rank: Captain
- Service number: 37194
- Unit: New Zealand Expeditionary Force
- Conflicts: First World War; Western Front
- Other work: First World War photographer
- Parents: Harold Armytage Sanders (father); Louisa Augusta Watkins (mother)

Henry Armytage Bradley Sanders (24 May 1886 – 5 May 1936) was born in England and became New Zealand's first official war photographer and cinematographer in France and Belgium, although he never traveled to New Zealand. During the First World War, he took all the New Zealand Expeditionary Force historical photographs and designated these with serial numbers in the H series. Thomas Frederick Scales was the official photographer in the United Kingdom. Malcolm Ross took photographs in Samoa and Egypt, but under censorship guidelines developed by British military headquarters he was specifically prohibited from taking photographs in France.

== Early life ==
In 1886, Sanders was born at Leytonstone, London, England, the son of Harold Armytage Thomas Sanders and Louisa Augusta Sanders née Watkins. In 1904, Sanders married Maude Marie Tugwell at St. Margaret's, Westminster, London, England. In 1910, Sanders married Lilian Mary Spurge at West Ham, Essex, England.

== First World War photographer ==
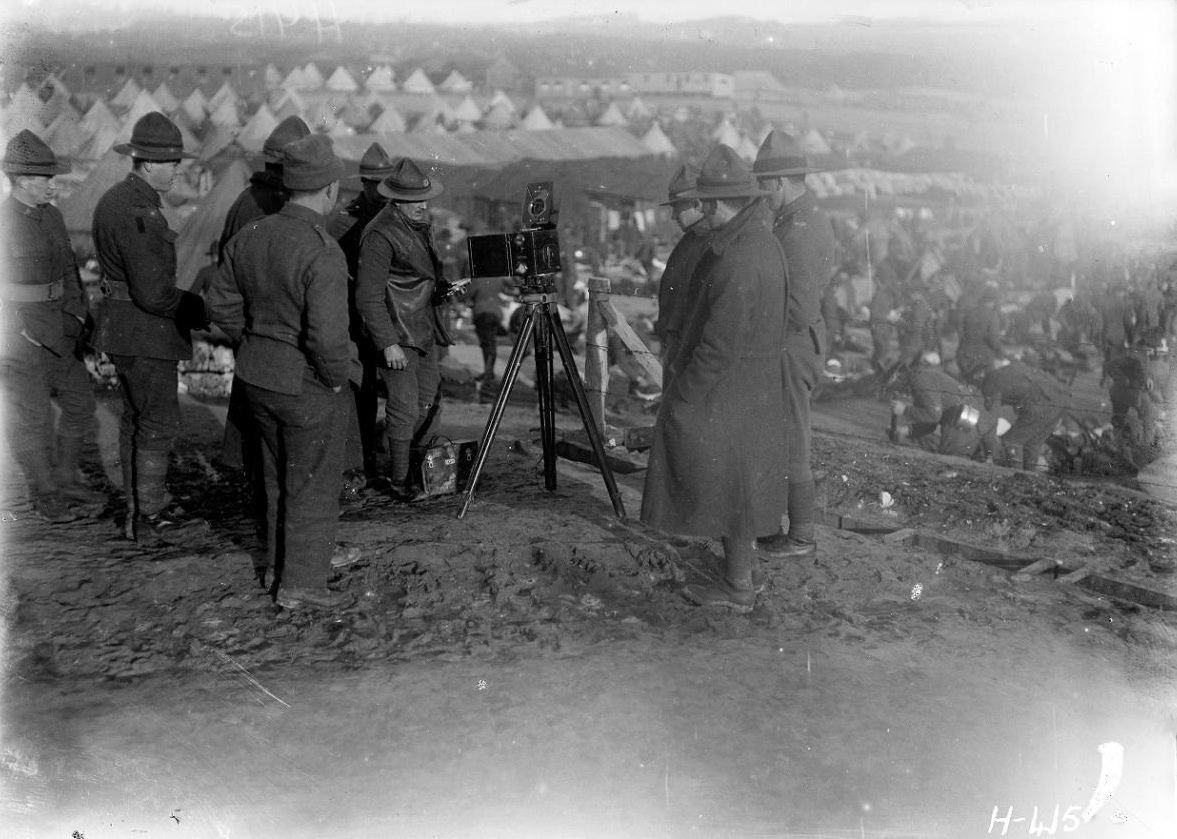
The camera of Henry Armytage Sanders in the First World War

By December 1916, the public interest in New Zealand for visuals of their troops in the First World War saw the New Zealand Government ask the New Zealand High Commissioner in London, Sir Thomas Mackenzie, to secure the right for New Zealand to appoint an official cameraman.

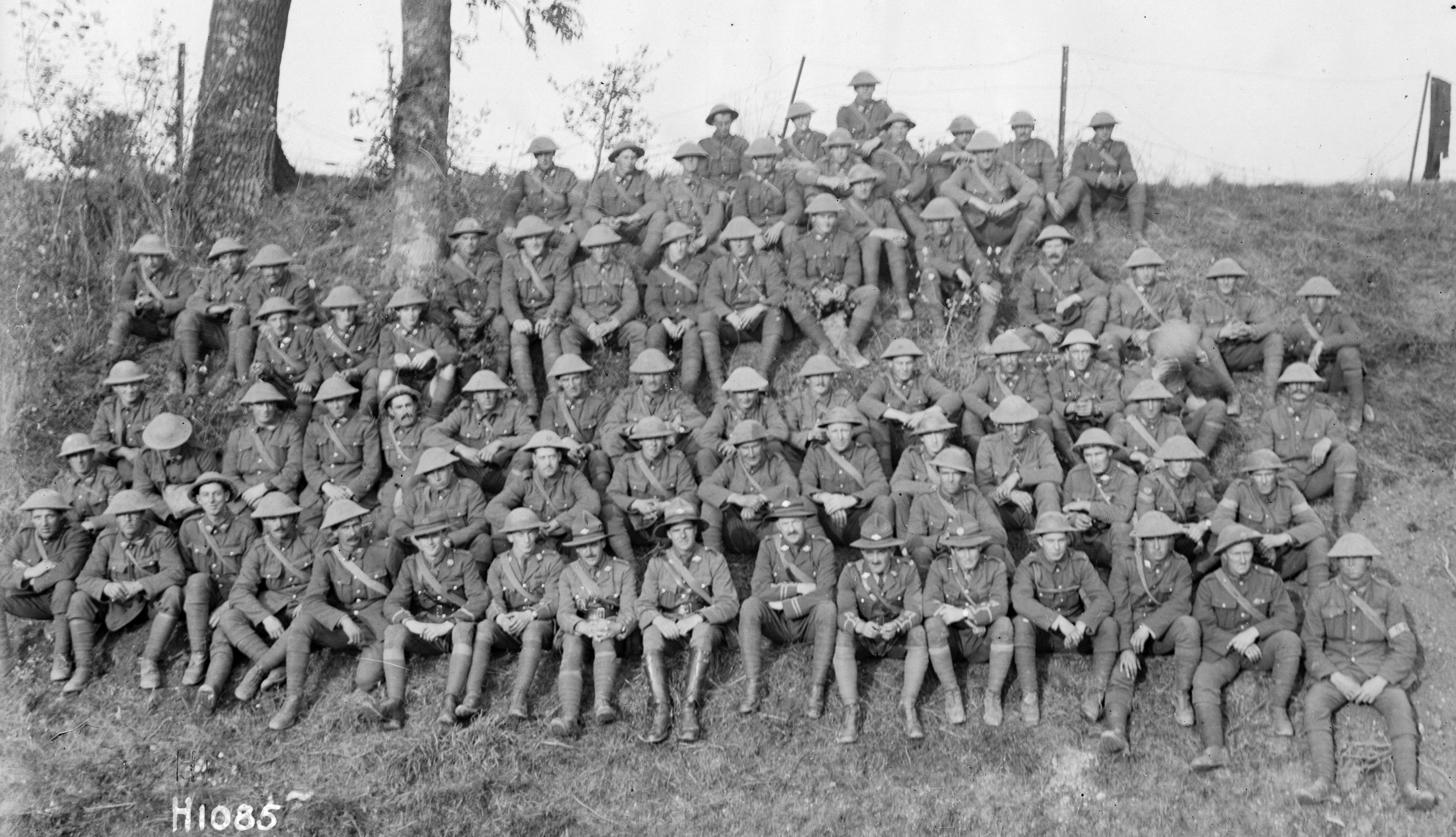
An unidentified company of a Wellington Regiment in World War I at Longsart, France on 14 October 1918 (Sanders photo H1085)

On 23 March 1917, Mackenzie replied (via cable) to inform the New Zealand War Office that an official photographer in the name of Henry Armytage Sanders, had been appointed and assigned to the Western Front attached to the New Zealand Expeditionary Force with rank of lieutenant pending the War Office's approval. On 2 April 1917, James Allen, New Zealand Minister of Defense and Acting Prime Minister replied that Sanders was unknown to New Zealand Picture Supplies or any other entity in the picture industry. Mackenzie answered the inquiry and informed Allen that Sanders had worked for the French company Pathé Frѐres and was a seasoned photographic and cinematographic professional. The terms were: ”All photographic materials to be supplied by New Zealand Government who will have sole rights to all photographs”. Sanders had already seen action working as the British cameraman for Pathé Gazette in Europe and filmed the war in 1914 when the Germans advanced into Belgium. He had nearly been captured.

On 8 March 1917, Sanders enlisted into the New Zealand Expeditionary Force (NZEF) in England. He was married and had 4 children. He was sent to France and met up with the New Zealand Tunnelling Company on 8 April 1917. Sanders took all the NZEF historical photographs and designated these with serial numbers in the H series. He remained with the NZEF until January 1919, went back to England to be discharged on 8 March 1919, then returned to work for Pathé Frѐres.

Although Sanders was commissioned as a lieutenant and appointed as the New Zealand Official Photographer, there were restrictions imposed by the War Office Cinematographic Committee. He was briefed on the regulations and the procedure to develop photographs and films, as follows:

1. The plates or films will be sent by the Official Photographer to General Headquarters ('I') for development. The Photographer will not be permitted to develop his own plates or films nor to superintend their development.
2. The photographs will be censored at General Headquarters, France, and forwarded to the War Office (M.I.7.a.), who will dispatch them direct to the High Commissioner. The photographs will be the absolute property of the New Zealand Government, on condition that any profits derived from their sale will be devoted to such war charities as the New Zealand Government may select.
3. The photographs when published will be shown as 'Official Photographs' and the name of the Official Photographer will not appear.
4. The Photographer must be a commissioned officer and unconnected with the Press.

== First World War cinematographer ==
Besides taking photographs, Sanders filmed the New Zealand troops and their activities in France. Due to the efforts of the War Office Cinematographic Committee, 12 official films have survived and were sent to the Imperial War Museum.

=== Select First World War Films ===
- Work of the New Zealand Medical Corps.
- New Zealand Battalion on the March [600 feet].
- Inspection of New Zealand Troops by Field Marshal Sir Douglas Haig [400 feet].

== Trips to America ==
On 22 June 1929, Sanders, age list as 43, occupation listed as news film editor, was accompanied by his wife Lillian M., age listed as 50, occupation listed as housewife. The couple sailed aboard the S.S. Carmania from Southampton and arrived at New York, New York on 30 June 1929.

On 25 June 1931, Sanders, age listed as 45, occupation listed as editor, was accompanied by his wife Lillian M., age listed as 53, occupation listed as housewife. The couple had sailed from Southampton on 16 June 1931 aboard the S.S. Lancastria and arrived at New York, New York.

On 4 August 1933, the Sanders couple arrived in New York City. Sanders, age listed as 47, occupation listed as editor, was accompanied by his wife Lillian Mary, age listed as 55, occupation listed as housewife. The couple had sailed aboard the S.S. Carmania from Glasgow on 26 July 1933.

== Later life ==
Sanders died in 1936 at the age of 49 at Ploughley, Oxfordshire, England. In 2019, his service medals from the First World War, the Victory Medal and the British War Medal, were found in the attic of a house in Devon. Put up for auction, they were purchased by New Zealand's National Army Museum for display at the museum's medal depository at Waiouru, in New Zealand.
