= Heinz Schnabel and Harry Wappler escape attempt =

Escape attempt by two WWII prisoners of war

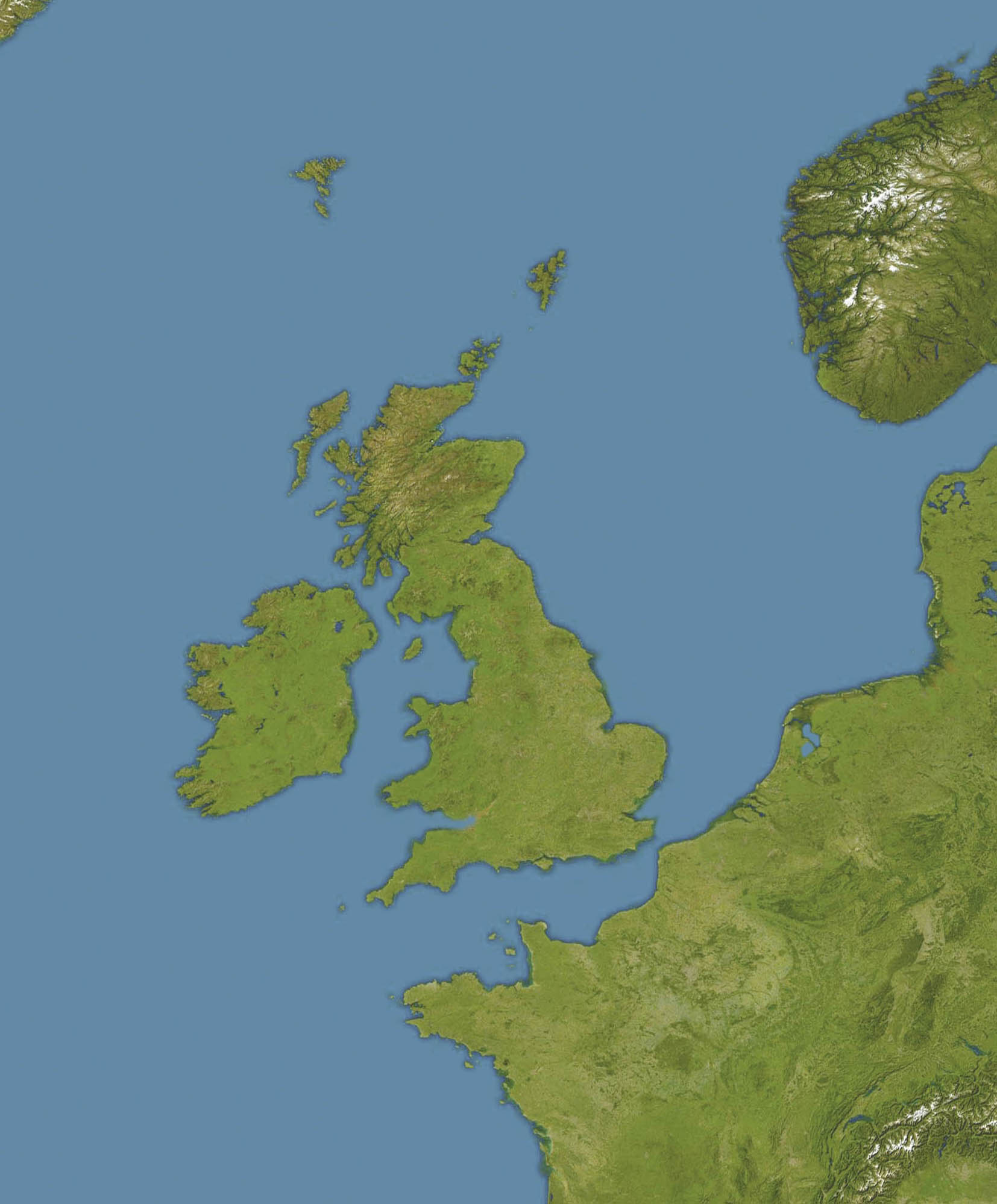

Heinz Schnabel and Harry Wappler were two Second World War German prisoners of war who escaped from a British prison camp and attempted to fly to the continent in a stolen aircraft on 24 November 1941.

Leutnant Schnabel and Oberleutnant Wappler were German Luftwaffe airmen who had been shot down during the Battle of Britain. Schnabel's aircraft was damaged by British fighters. He crash-landed in Kent on 5 September 1940; Wappler's bomber had hit a barrage balloon over Newport one week later and crashed. The two were taken as prisoners of war (POWs) to Shap Wells, where they were held for a year. On 23 November 1941, the aviators, equipped with fake Dutch uniforms and forged identity documents, escaped from the prison camp and made their way to the British air base at RAF Kingstown. The next day they stole a trainer aircraft, with the intention of flying to the German-occupied Netherlands. However, this flight would have stretched their machine's fuel range to its maximum, and unknown to the German escapees, their plane's fuel tanks were only half full. The pair decided to land in eastern England when they realised that they would run out of fuel over the North Sea if they continued. They were caught on the ground, and returned to prisoner camps.

== Background ==
=== Heinz Schnabel ===
Heinz Schnabel was a member of the 1st squadron (Staffel) of Jagdgeschwader 3 and was an ace with six enemy aircraft confirmed destroyed at the time. He had taken off on the morning on 5 September 1940 at 08:40 to escort Dornier Do 17 bombers for a raid on Croydon. His Messerschmitt Bf 109 was intercepted by RAF Spitfire and Hurricane fighters on its return to France and its engine was disabled. Schnabel crash-landed in a field at Handen Farm near Aldington, Kent, shortly after 10am.

After capture, Schnabel was sent to hospital due to injuries to his spine and a pre-existing chest wound he had sustained during the Battle of France. After he recuperated he was sent to the No. 1 POW Camp (Officers) Grizedale Hall and then later to the POW camp from which his escape attempt was to be made at Shap Wells in Cumbria.

=== Harry Wappler ===
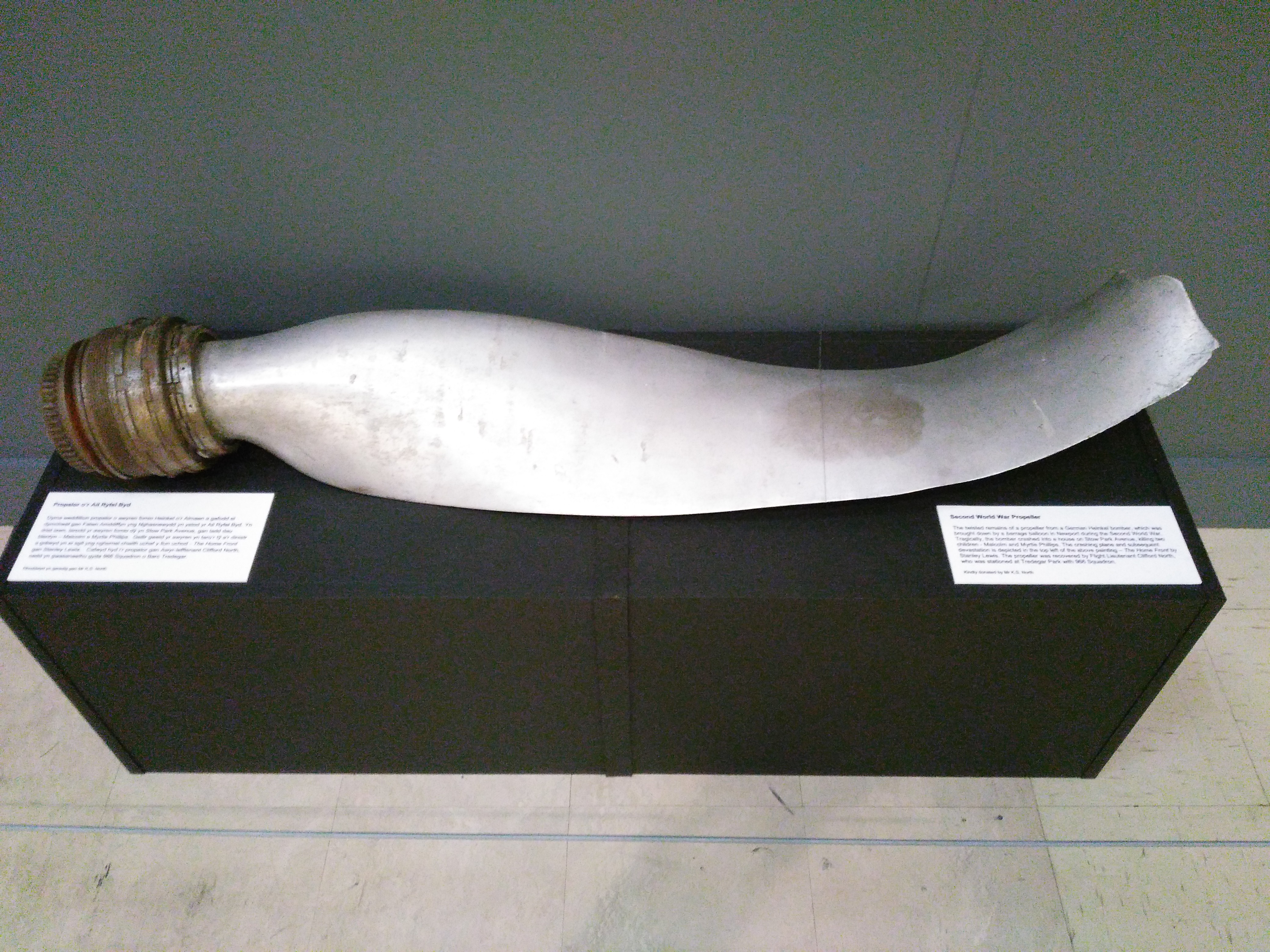
Propeller blade from Wappler's Heinkel He 111, the first enemy bomber to be brought down by a barrage balloon during the Second World War. Newport Museum.

Oberleutnant Harry Wappler was the pilot of a four-man Heinkel He 111 P-2 bomber of Kampfgeschwader 27 (8 Staffel (squadron)) which had left an airfield in northern France on the evening of 12 September 1940 on a bombing sortie to Ellesmere Port in Cheshire, England. After they had bombed their intended target they headed for home; their return route took the aircraft over Newport in south Wales, a secondary target. Wappler's aircraft still had two bombs aboard and to ensure accuracy he flew low to avoid cloud cover and the bomber flew into cables strung from barrage balloons of No. 966 Balloon Squadron AAF in the early morning of 13 September. Close to Tredegar Park and at approximately 6,500 ft (2,000 m), the bomber hit the first cable of several mobile Fordson barrage balloon winches scattered around the park. The bomber's starboard wing sliced into the cable and stalled the aircraft. The severely damaged aircraft flew on with its left engine on fire and ran into a second cable. Wappler was thrown out of the doomed bomber which crashed at 03:15 onto a house in Stow Park Avenue, Newport, killing the remaining three crew members as well as two teenagers in the house.

Wappler's aircraft was the first confirmed loss in Britain of an aircraft to a barrage balloon during the Second World War. After interrogation, Wappler was sent to the Shap Wells hotel, requisitioned for use as POW camp No. 13, located between Kendal and Penrith in Cumbria.

== Shap Wells prison camp ==
The Shap Wells hotel was opened in 1833, and was known for its water and as having the "finest air of Britain". It was requisitioned in 1939 during World War II to serve as a prisoner-of-war camp for officers, non-commissioned officers and petty officers, most of them from the German navy or the Luftwaffe. Known then as "Camp 15", the hotel was surrounded by a barbed wire fence, and was equipped with searchlights; the guards lived in Nissen huts. At the time when Schnabel and Wappler arrived, the camp held approximately 250 POWs.

== Escape attempt ==
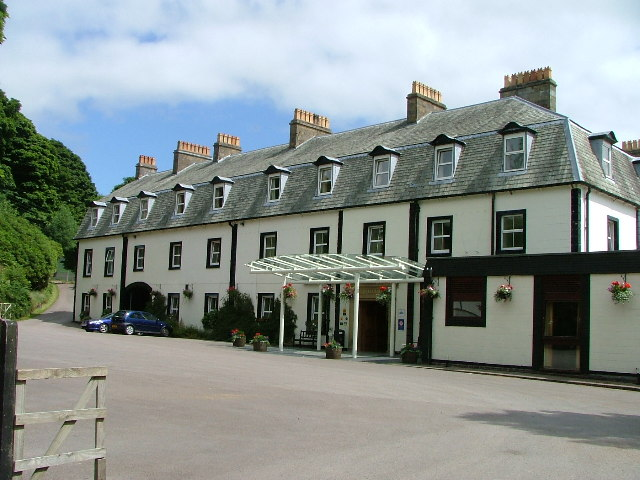
Shap Wells hotel in 2005. It was used as a prisoner-of-war camp, which Schnabel and Wappler escaped from during the war

Prior to their escape, the German pilots had secretly put together Dutch pilots' uniforms by altering Luftwaffe uniforms. They managed to create plaster of Paris tunic buttons covered in foil to resemble those of the Dutch air force. They also created within the camp false Dutch identification documents; Schnabel carried papers in the name of Pilot Officer George Harry David and Wappler as Flight Lieutenant Harry Graven.

On Sunday 23 November 1941, Schnabel and Wappler hid within a log pile that camp prisoners had constructed; it was to serve as fuel for the camp during the coming winter but a space had been left inside so that the two Germans could hide there. After dark they carefully made their way to the camp fence which they managed to prise apart using wooden tools made for the occasion. They headed towards the nearby railway line where they climbed aboard a Carlisle-bound freight train which had been slowed by ascending the steep Shap Bank.

The pair left the train after it pulled into a yard and then the two escapees spent a few hours in a Carlisle cinema. After the end of the film, they mingled with the rest of the audience which included airmen from the local airfield at RAF Kingstown (later to become RAF Carlisle (No. 15 Elementary Flying Training School)). After entering the camp using their false papers they spent the night hidden behind a hangar.

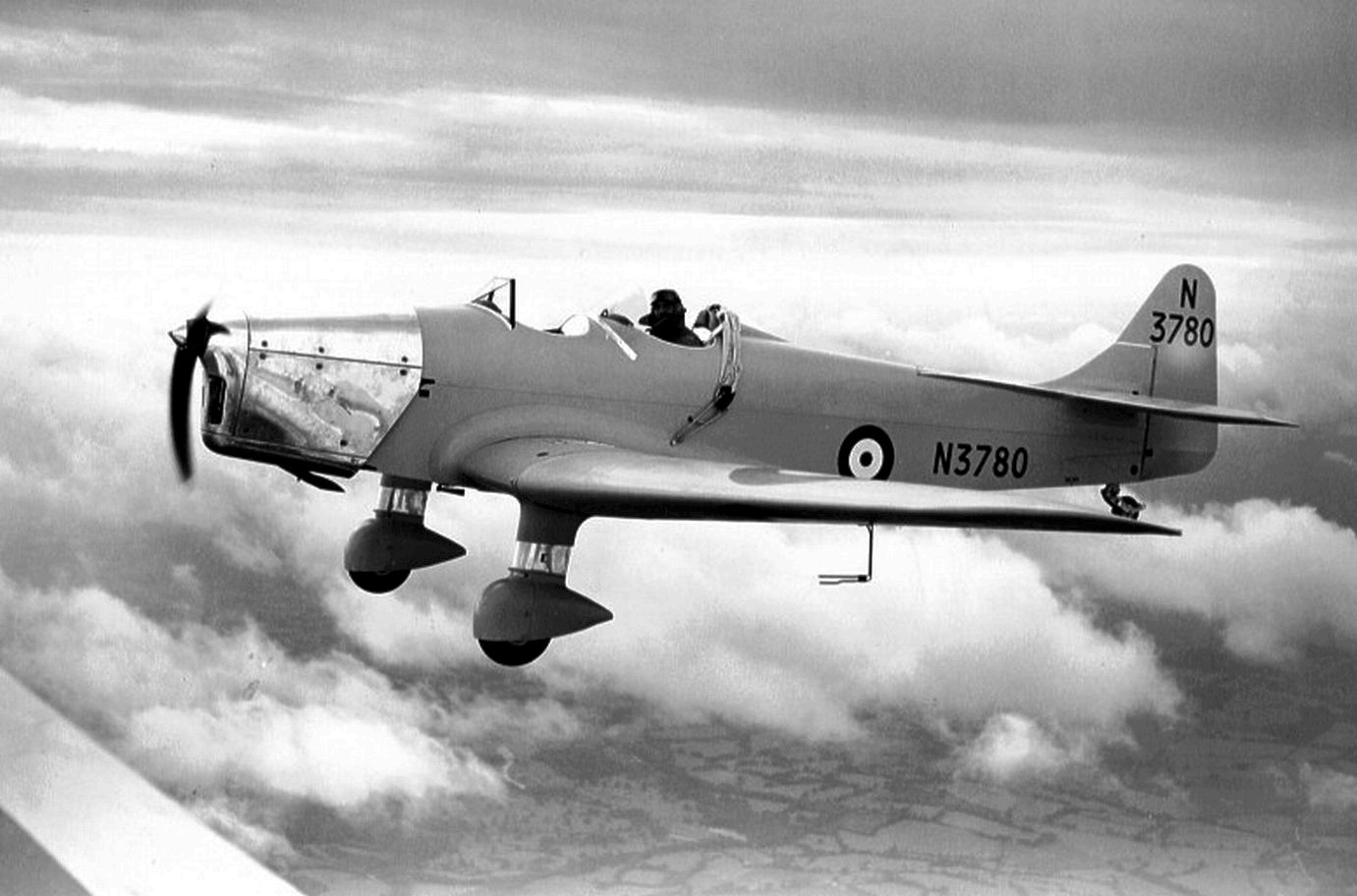
A Miles Magister elementary trainer.

On the morning of Monday 24 November, the Germans bluffed an airfield mechanic to start up a Miles Magister trainer aircraft. The escapees initially thought of heading towards neutral Ireland but the weather over the Irish Sea looked poor for an open cockpit aircraft and instead the Germans headed south east, with hopes of reaching the German-occupied Netherlands.

The trainer had only a half tank of fuel when the pair took off. When they flew out over the coast they realised they would have to land and refuel; they could not risk ditching in the North Sea as they had no survival gear. They landed the trainer in a meadow near Scratby, five miles north of Great Yarmouth in Norfolk at around 15:00. They again showed their false Dutch papers to a local policeman, Sergeant Clifford Fisk. Wappler asked if they could call the local airfield and request fuel be sent to them, so Fisk took Wappler to Caister Police Station. Another policeman remained with the other 'Dutchman' and the aircraft.

As it was late, a car was sent to pick up the airmen and take them to the RAF Bomber Command base at RAF Horsham St. Faith (now Norwich International Airport). The two airmen were put in unoccupied officers' quarters. However, news of their escape in the Miles Magister was broadcast across the country, and they were arrested in their quarters while one of them was taking a bath.

The pilots were sentenced to 28 days of solitary confinement and later transferred to a POW camp in Canada where they spent the remainder of their internment.
