= Harry Arthur Crowhurst =

Harry Arthur Crowhurst (14 March 1868 – 8 December 1943) was a photographer, optician and partner in a lantern and optical supply business.

== Life and Times ==
In 1868, Crowhurst was born at St George the Martyr, London. He was the son of William Henry and Julia Ann Crowhurst. He had one brother, Walter William, and 2 sisters, Ellen Mable and Julia May. In 1943, he died at Southampton, Hampshire, England. In 1891, the Census of England and Wales noted that Crowhurst, age 23, had the occupation as optician. In 1900, he teamed with Harold Armytage Sanders to form the firm of Sanders and Crowhurst. In 1901, the Census of England and Wales noted that Crowhurst, age 33, listed occupation as optician. In May 1905, Crowhurst married the daughter of James Williamson, noted film pioneer, and took over the Williamson business.

== W. Watson and Son ==
W. Watson and Son was an optical instrument maker. In 1837, the William Watson business was established in London for the manufacture of optical instruments. By the 1840s, the company moved into lanterns, slides and associated equipment. In 1868, the name was changed to W. Watson & Son and by this time were located at 313 High Holborn, London. In the 1870s, the company added photographic equipment and became known as a leading manufacturer of the Highest Class Photographic Instruments and Apparatus in England. Into the 1940s, the company remained at 313 High Holborn, London, England.

== Sanders & Crowhurst ==
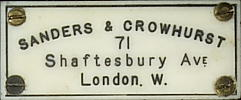
Sanders & Crowhurst optician sign

Established in 1900, Crowhurst teamed with Harold Armytage Sanders to form the firm of Sanders and Crowhurst that became an agent for W. Watson and Son. The going interest was to serve as lantern and slide dealers and also offer service as opticians. The partnership dissolved on 21 October 1908. When the partnership dissolved in 1908, Sanders continued in business as Sanders and Company at the Shaftesbury Avenue address, and Crowhurst continued in business at the Hove branch location.
