= Fly Atlantic =

Upcoming British low-cost carrier

IATA	ICAO	Call sign
–	–	–
- Commenced operations: 2027 (expected)
- Operating bases: Belfast International Airport; Paris-Charles de Gaulle Airport; Paris-Orly Airport; Istanbul Airport
- Headquarters: Belfast, Northern Ireland, United Kingdom
- Key people: Andrew Pyne (CEO); Guy Maclean (Accountable Manager [designate] & COO)
- Website: flyatlantic.com

Fly Atlantic (stylised as FlyAtlantic) is an upcoming Northern Irish low-cost carrier aiming to offer transatlantic flights to North America starting in mid-2027 from its base at Belfast International Airport in Northern Ireland. In addition to serving North American destinations, FlyAtlantic plans to connect underserved or unserved cities in the United Kingdom and the European Union to its transatlantic network. The airline intends to initially base six aircraft at Belfast International Airport, with plans to expand its fleet to 60 next-generation, fuel-efficient narrow-body aircraft by 2031.

== History ==
Fly Atlantic first revealed its plans in late November 2022, aiming to launch flights to a total of 35 destinations in the United States, Canada, United Kingdom and Europe from its Belfast hub. The airline said it was considering acquiring either Airbus A321LR or Boeing 737 MAX aircraft and was in talks with both Airbus and Boeing. It planned to launch ticket sales in early 2024.

The airline said it would initially have 50 employees at Belfast International Airport, with plans to create 1000s of jobs in the first five years of operation. With its flights, Belfast International Airport would become a hub linking North America and Europe, complementing the local passengers already being served by the airport. CEO Andrew Pyne cited the facilities offered to the airline and airport operator Vinci's enthusiasm and commitment to supporting the airline as factors in choosing Belfast International Airport as the airline's base.

In June 2023, Fly Atlantic announced it would push back its start date to spring 2025, with Pyne citing delivery times for new aircraft, aircraft and airport infrastructure availability, and licensing processes. Pyne also said the airline was pushing for US immigration and customs preclearance to be set up at Belfast International Airport, noting that the airports serving the Irish cities of Dublin and Shannon already had such facilities. Separately, Antrim and Newtownabbey Borough Council said it had provided £35,000 in funding to the airline, with £20,000 to cover costs incurred with concluding an investment agreement for the airline's establishment and £15,000 to support a bid to the UK Government's Levelling Up Fund.

At the same time, Pyne mentioned that Fly Atlantic was in discussions with regional startup Lakeland Airways about establishing a feeder network from Belfast International using ATR turboprops. This network would include up to 20 UK and Irish airports including the Isle of Man, Jersey, and London-City.
