= Irthington =

Village and civil parish in Cumbria, England

Coordinates: 54.946°N 2.785°W

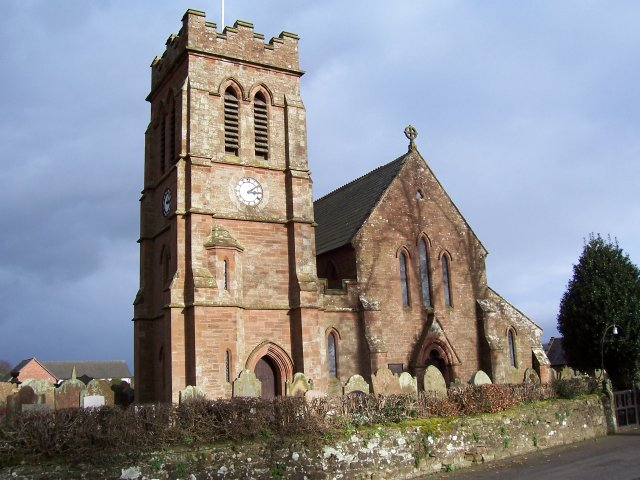
- St Kentigern's Church

- Location within Cumbria
- Population: 777 (Census 2021)
- OS grid reference: NY4918059994
- Civil parish: Irthington
- Unitary authority: Cumberland
- Ceremonial county: Cumbria
- Region: North West
- Country: England
- Sovereign state: United Kingdom
- Post town: Carlisle
- Postcode district: CA6
- Dialling code: 01697
- Police: Cumbria
- Fire: Cumbria
- Ambulance: North West
- UK Parliament: Carlisle

Irthington is a village and civil parish within the Cumberland district in Cumbria, England, situated to the north-east of Carlisle Lake District Airport. The population in 2021 was 777 according to the 2021 census.

== Toponymy ==
The name Irthington derives from Old English and means farmstead or village on the river Irthing.

== History ==
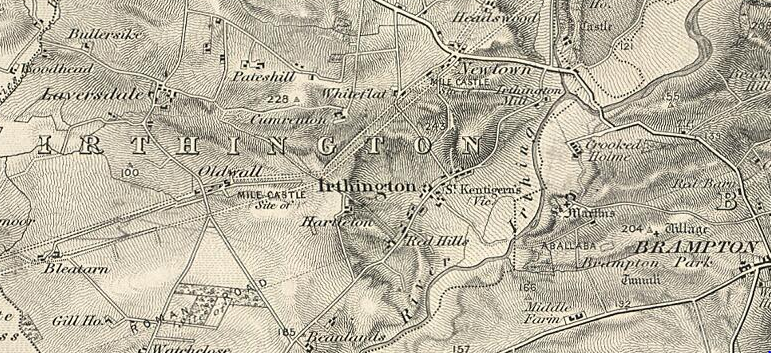
A historical map extract of the village in the 19th century.

The most important period in Irthington's history was during the Romano-British era. Irthington lies on top of the line of the Roman Stanegate road which preceded Hadrian's Wall and ran from Corbridge (Coria) west to Carlisle (Luguvalium). The village was described in 1884 as being "intersected by the site of the great Roman wall, and also by the military road [ie the Stanegate] from Newcastle to Carlisle". Some of the building stone used in the south wall of the church of St Kentigern's chancel is thought to come from Hadrian's Wall, which ran less than 1 kilometre (0.62 mi) to the northwest of the village, though its stone locally has been robbed. St Kentigern's church is dated as far back as Norman times. Restoration took place in 1849 in the gothic tradition. Since then, more restoration has taken place including the addition of a five-bell clock tower. The historical remains of the arcades of round arches set on round piers remain by the church, and are dated to the 1170s.

The remains of Irthington Castle, a medieval motte, are a hundred yards or so south of the church.

In the 1870s Irthington was described as:

" a village, a township, and a parish, in Brampton district, Cumberland. The township comprises 947 acres"

== Population ==
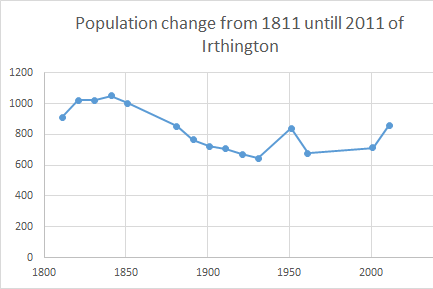
Population time series

In the 2011 census the population of the village was 860. However, as early as 1831 it stood at 1049 and has since been variable. This number has not changed significantly over the last 200 years apart from a sharp increase as shown in the population time series in 1951 due to a change in area boundary. The male to female ratio has rarely been more than marginally different. In 1801, there was 430 men to 440 women while in 2011 there were 416 men to 444 women, only a small increase from 10 to 28. Another aspect of the population is that as of 2011, 840 of the 860 residents were born within the UK. This gives a total percentage of UK born residents of 98%. Newtown is a village in Irthington.

== Occupation data ==
Occupation data according to a vision of Britain

The data taken from 1881 shows that 197 people worked within the Agriculture or Farming occupation. This means that 23%, almost a quarter of the 853 people living in Irthington during this census were under this occupation, the largest in the village. The next largest occupation is of people without a specified occupation. 102 people during this census come under this occupation, 12% of the population. The fact that second largest occupation is almost half of the highest occupation shows the importance that agriculture and farming played. The third highest populated occupation in 1881 was "domestic services and offices". 57 people, 7% of the population were employed or engaged in this area of work. These top three occupations accounted for 42% of the occupation of the entire population of the village. More recently, the occupations of the population have changed. Of the 860 residents, 118 people work within the skilled trades occupation which equates to 14% which is above the national average. The second most populated occupation is that of professional occupations where 80 people work within, which accounts for 9%, almost half the national average. The third highest occupation within Irthington is of Managers, directors and senior officials. This accounts for 6% of the total employment and is also below the national average for the same occupation. The occupational transition has seen a large shift away from reliance on the agricultural sector. It has also seen a reliance a limited number of occupations with the top 3 occupations accounting for 29%, down 11% in 1881.

== Tourism ==
Irthington offers a range of holiday accommodation with eight hotels/inns available in the area. The airport located nearby should be useful for anyone who is a tourist to Irthington once passenger services as well as freight are provided. The main element of tourism in Irthington is the close proximity to the Hadrian's Wall trail which attracts people to stop in the village. However, tourism does not play a major part in the local economy.

== Transport ==
Irthington is a rather remote village. In terms of rail link the closest train station is Carlisle railway station which is 9 miles (14 km) away from Irthington, which equates to approximately 20 minutes away by car. The nearest aviation transport is Carlisle Lake District Airport, which is located just over 1 mile (1.6 km) away from Irthington. The airport is not currently offering commercial flights, but redevelopment which started in December 2014 was predicted to see flights available to London and Dublin by 2016. This development has also reportedly safeguarded the employment of 800 people.

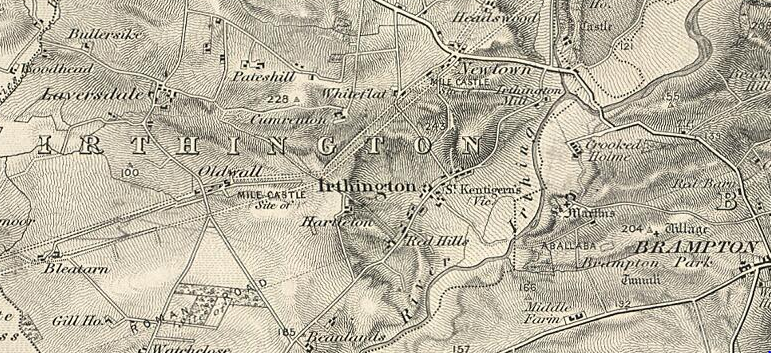
A historical map extract of this village in the 19th century.

== See also ==
- Listed buildings in Irthington
- Brampton Old Church
