= Carlisle City Council elections =

Local government elections in Cumbria, England

One third of Carlisle City Council in Cumbria, England, was elected each year, followed by one year without election.

The council was established in 1974 and abolished in 2023.

From the last boundary changes in 1999 until its abolition in 2023, 52 councillors were elected from 22 wards.

== Political control ==
The first election to the council was held in 1973, initially operating as a shadow authority alongside the outgoing authorities until the new arrangements came into effect on 1 April 1974. Political control of the council from 1974 until its abolition in 2023 was as follows:

Party in control	Years
Labour	1974–1976
No overall control	1976–1979
Labour	1979–1999
Conservative	1999–2003
No overall control	2003–2012
Labour	2012–2019
No overall control	2019–2021
Conservative	2021–2023

=== Leadership ===
The leaders of the council from 1999 until the council's abolition in 2023 were:

Councillor	Party	From	To
Mike Mitchelson	Conservative	1999	21 May 2012
Joe Hendry	Labour	21 May 2012	30 May 2013
Colin Glover	Labour	16 Jul 2013	May 2019
John Mallinson	Conservative	20 May 2019	31 Mar 2023

== Council elections ==
Summary of the council composition after recent council elections, click on the year for full details of each election. Boundary changes took place for the 1999 election which increased the number of seats by one, leading to the whole council being elected in that year.

- 1973 Carlisle City Council election
- 1976 Carlisle City Council election
- 1979 Carlisle City Council election
- 1983 Carlisle City Council election (New ward boundaries)
- 1984 Carlisle City Council election (City boundary changes took place but the number of seats remained the same)
- 1986 Carlisle City Council election
- 1987 Carlisle City Council election
- 1988 Carlisle City Council election
- 1990 Carlisle City Council election (City boundary changes took place but the number of seats remained the same)
- 1991 Carlisle City Council election

Year	Labour	Conservative	Independent	Liberal Democrats	Green Party	UKIP	Vacant	Notes
1992	30	18	1	2	0	0	0	
1994	27	20	1	3	0	0	0	
1995	30	17	1	3	0	0	0	
1996	33	14	1	3	0	0	0	
1998	33	14	1	3	0	0	0	
1999	16	28	2	6	0	0	0	New ward boundaries
2000	14	30	2	6	0	0	0	
2002	18	27	2	5	0	0	0	
2003	22	24	1	5	0	0	0	
2004	24	20	1	7	0	0	0	
2006	24	19	1	8	0	0	0	
2007	25	19	1	7	0	0	0	
2008	21	21	1	7	0	0	2	
2010	23	22	2	5	0	0	0	
2011	24	22	2	4	0	0	0	
2012	27	20	2	2	0	0	1	
2014	29	19	2	2	0	0	0	
2015	29	20	2	1	0	0	0	
2016	28	20	3	1	0	0	0	
2018	27	21	3	1	0	0	0	
2019	15	17	4	1	1	1	0	New ward boundaries

== District result maps ==
2002 results map

2003 results map

2004 results map

2006 results map

2007 results map

2008 results map

2010 results map

2011 results map

2012 results map

2014 results map

2015 results map

2016 results map

2018 results map

2019 results map

== By-election results ==
By-elections occur when seats become vacant between council elections. Below is a summary of recent by-elections; full by-election results can be found by clicking on the by-election name.

By-election	Date	Incumbent party	Winning party
Trinity	17 October 1996	Liberal Democrats	Liberal Democrats
Belle Vue	2 October 1997	Labour	Labour
Stanwix Rural	2 October 1997	Conservative	Conservative
Castle by-election	19 April 2001	Liberal Democrats	Labour
Castle by-election	24 November 2005	Liberal Democrats	Liberal Democrats
Upperby by-election (2 seats)	12 June 2008	Labour	Labour
Belah by-election	5 March 2009	Conservative	Conservative
Castle by-election	5 March 2009	Liberal Democrats	Liberal Democrats
Stanwix Urban by-election	16 September 2010	Conservative	Conservative
Harraby by-election	21 June 2012	Labour	Labour
Yewdale by-election	5 September 2013	Labour	Labour
Dalston by-election	17 October 2013	Conservative	Liberal Democrats
Castle by-election	11 September 2014	Labour	Labour
Botcherby by-election	7 January 2016	Labour	Independent
Castle by-election	15 September 2016	Labour	Labour
Castle by-election	24 November 2016	Labour	Labour
Belle Vue by-election	4 May 2017	Labour	Labour
Yewdale by-election	4 May 2017	Labour	Conservative
Denton Holme by-election	6 September 2018	Labour	Labour
Cathedral and Castle by-election	6 May 2021	Labour	Labour
Harraby South and Parklands by-election	6 May 2021	Labour	Conservative
Newtown and Morton North by-election	6 May 2021	Labour	Conservative
Currock and Upperby by-election	28 October 2021	UKIP	Labour
Longtown and the Border by-election	5 May 2022	Conservative	Liberal Democrats

A detailed breakdown of recent by elections can be found below:

Election	Political result	Candidate	Party	Votes	%	±%
Castle & Cathedral by-election, 6 May 2021 triggered by the resignation of Cllr. Chris Robinson; Turnout: 1,713 (25.9%)	Labour hold Majority: 74 (39.3%) 4.3	Pete Sunter	Labour	673	39.3	+4.7
Castle & Cathedral by-election, 6 May 2021 triggered by the resignation of Cllr. Chris Robinson; Turnout: 1,713 (25.9%)	Labour hold Majority: 74 (39.3%) 4.3	Hugh McKerrell	Conservative	599	35	+19.6
Castle & Cathedral by-election, 6 May 2021 triggered by the resignation of Cllr. Chris Robinson; Turnout: 1,713 (25.9%)	Labour hold Majority: 74 (39.3%) 4.3	Gavin Hawkton	Green	299	17.5	-0.7
Castle & Cathedral by-election, 6 May 2021 triggered by the resignation of Cllr. Chris Robinson; Turnout: 1,713 (25.9%)	Labour hold Majority: 74 (39.3%) 4.3	Stuart Kelly	Liberal Democrats	95	5.5	-3.0
Harraby South and Parklands by-election, 6 May 2021; Electorate: 6,628; Turnout: 1,926 (29.06%)	Conservative gain from Labour Party (UK); Majority: 276 (53.4%)	Linda Mitchell	Conservative	1028	53.4	
Harraby South and Parklands by-election, 6 May 2021; Electorate: 6,628; Turnout: 1,926 (29.06%)	Conservative gain from Labour Party (UK); Majority: 276 (53.4%)	Abdul Harid	Labour	752	39	
Harraby South and Parklands by-election, 6 May 2021; Electorate: 6,628; Turnout: 1,926 (29.06%)	Conservative gain from Labour Party (UK); Majority: 276 (53.4%)	Anne Gadsden	Green	132	6.9	
Newton & Morton North by-election, 6 May 2021; Electorate: 6,844; Turnout: 1,805 (26.37%)	Conservative gain from Labour Party (UK); Majority: 116 (48.9%)	Neville Lishman	Conservative	883	48.9	
Newton & Morton North by-election, 6 May 2021; Electorate: 6,844; Turnout: 1,805 (26.37%)	Conservative gain from Labour Party (UK); Majority: 116 (48.9%)	David Graham	Labour	767	42.5	
Newton & Morton North by-election, 6 May 2021; Electorate: 6,844; Turnout: 1,805 (26.37%)	Conservative gain from Labour Party (UK); Majority: 116 (48.9%)	Fiona Prior	Green	101	5.6	
Newton & Morton North by-election, 6 May 2021; Electorate: 6,844; Turnout: 1,805 (26.37%)	Conservative gain from Labour Party (UK); Majority: 116 (48.9%)	Brent Kennedy	TUSC	40	2.2	
Currock & Upperby by-election, 28 October 2021 triggered by the death of incumbent Cllr. John Denholm; Electorate: 6,550; Turnout: 1,111 (16.96%)	Labour gain from UK Independence Party; Majority: 224 (57.5%) +20.7	Chris Wills	Labour	636	57.5	+20.7
Currock & Upperby by-election, 28 October 2021 triggered by the death of incumbent Cllr. John Denholm; Electorate: 6,550; Turnout: 1,111 (16.96%)	Labour gain from UK Independence Party; Majority: 224 (57.5%) +20.7	Geoff Mitchell	Conservative	412	57.5	+22.2
Currock & Upperby by-election, 28 October 2021 triggered by the death of incumbent Cllr. John Denholm; Electorate: 6,550; Turnout: 1,111 (16.96%)	Labour gain from UK Independence Party; Majority: 224 (57.5%) +20.7	Tom Adams	Green	59	5.3	-6.3
Longtown & the Border by-election, 5 May 2022 triggered by the death of incumbent Cllr. Valerie Tarbitt; Electorate: 5,794; Turnout: 2,218 (38.30%)	Liberal Democrats gain from Conservatives; Majority: 299 (13.6%)	Timothy Pickstone	Liberal Democrats	1,247	56.8	+56.8
Longtown & the Border by-election, 5 May 2022 triggered by the death of incumbent Cllr. Valerie Tarbitt; Electorate: 5,794; Turnout: 2,218 (38.30%)	Liberal Democrats gain from Conservatives; Majority: 299 (13.6%)	Sam Bown	Conservative	948	43.2	-1.5
