= 2007 Carlisle City Council election =

2007 election in Carlisle, England

Map of the results of the 2007 Carlisle City Council election. Labour in red, Conservatives in blue and Liberal Democrats in yellow. Wards in grey were not contested in 2007.

The 2007 Carlisle City Council election took place on 3 May 2007 to elect members of Carlisle District Council in Cumbria, England. One third of the council was up for election and the council stayed under no overall control.

After the election, the composition of the council was:

- Labour 25
- Conservative 19
- Liberal Democrats 7
- Independent 1

== Background ==
Before the election the Conservative party formed the administration on the council with the support of the Liberal Democrats, but Labour were the largest party with 24 seats, compared to 19 Conservatives, 7 Liberal Democrats and 1 independent. A further seat was vacant in Morton, after the Liberal Democrat councillor Ralph Aldersey stood down from the council.

18 seats were being contested with Labour needing to make at least 2 gains to take control of the council. Candidates at the election included an independent Maureen Toole in Belah ward, after her husband Alan Toole, the sitting councillor for the ward, was deselected by the Conservatives. Both the Conservative and Labour parties contested all 18 seats, while the Liberal Democrats had candidates in 6 wards. The British National Party contested seats in Carlisle for the first time, with 6 candidates, and there was also 1 candidate from the English Democrats.

== Campaign ==
Labour campaigned on a pledge to tackle anti-social behaviour, such as dog fouling and littering, and targeted Morton from the Liberal Democrats and Belah from the Conservatives, where they were hoping the Conservative vote would be split due to the independent candidate. Meanwhile, the Conservatives defended their record in control of the council and targeted the Labour held seats of Belle Vue and Yewdale. The Liberal Democrats defended their seats, while hoping to gain Dalston from the Conservatives and Upperby from Labour.

During the campaign the national Conservative leader David Cameron visited Carlisle to support his party in the election, while the Constitutional Affairs Minister Harriet Harman came to support Labour.

== Election result ==
Only 1 seat changed hands at the election, with Labour gaining Morton from the Liberal Democrats to remain the largest party on the council with 25 seats. Labour also narrowly beat off Conservative challenges in Belle Vue by 31 votes and in Yewdale by only 10 votes. This meant the Conservatives stayed on 19 councillors, the Liberal Democrats dropped to 7, and there continued to be 1 independent. Among those elected was Labour's Abdul Harid in Currock ward, who became the first Asian councillor on Carlisle council, defeating the British National Party who came second in the ward. Overall turnout at the election was 35.45%, up from 34.6% at the 2006 election.

Following the election Conservative Mike Mitchelson remained as leader of the council after the Liberal Democrats continued to support him, in return for which Liberal Democrat Peter Farmer joined the council executive. The election for mayor was won by Conservative Liz Mallinson by 26 votes to 25 for Labour's Mary Styth, after one Labour councillor missed the meeting, while Mike Mitchelson was re-elected by 26 votes to 24. All 7 Liberal Democrats backed the Conservative candidates, while the only independent councillor Bill Graham, voted for the Labour candidate for mayor Mary Styth, as she had served on the council for the longest period, and abstained on the vote for council leader.

Carlisle local election result 2007
Party	Seats	Gains	Losses	Net gain/loss	Seats %	Votes %	Votes	+/−
Labour	9	1	0	+1	50.0	38.6	9,639	+3.0%
Conservative	8	0	0	0	44.4	42.6	10,635	+1.9%
Liberal Democrats	1	0	1	-1	5.6	11.9	2,969	-1.8%
BNP	0	0	0	0	0	5.0	1,252	+5.0%
Independent	0	0	0	0	0	1.6	399	-6.7%
English Democrat	0	0	0	0	0	0.4	96	-0.5%

== Ward results ==
Belah
Party	Candidate	Votes	%	±%
Conservative	Trish Vasey	818	43.3	−11.0
Labour	Thomas Johnson	482	25.5	+1.3
Independent	Maureen Toole	399	21.1	+13.4
English Democrat	Stephen Gash	96	5.1	−8.7
BNP	Wayne Newton	96	5.1	+5.1
Majority		336	17.8	−12.3
Turnout		1,891	40.1	+.2
Conservative hold		Swing		

Belle Vue
Party	Candidate	Votes	%	±%
Labour	Mary Styth	652	44.1	+0.7
Conservative	Fiona Robson	621	42.0	+0.0
Liberal Democrats	Olive Hall	205	13.9	+13.9
Majority		31	2.1	+0.7
Turnout		1,478	34.3	+1.7
Labour hold		Swing		

Botcherby
Party	Candidate	Votes	%	±%
Labour	Terry Scarborough	618	50.0	−5.5
Conservative	Terri Cartner	400	32.4	+3.4
BNP	Karl Chappell	217	17.6	+17.6
Majority		218	17.7	−8.9
Turnout		1,235	27.8	+3.5
Labour hold		Swing		

Burgh
Party	Candidate	Votes	%	±%
Conservative	John Collier	540	74.3	+1.8
Labour	Robin Pearson	187	25.7	−1.8
Majority		353	48.6	+3.5
Turnout		727	43.0	+9.0
Conservative hold		Swing		

Castle
Party	Candidate	Votes	%	±%
Liberal Democrats	Kimberly Hunter	607	54.1	+0.1
Labour	Steven Bowditch	331	29.5	+2.1
Conservative	Charlotte Fisher	185	16.5	+3.8
Majority		276	24.6	−2.0
Turnout		1,123	27.6	−0.7
Liberal Democrats hold		Swing		

Currock
Party	Candidate	Votes	%	±%
Labour	Abdul Harid	571	44.5	−11.7
BNP	Brian Allen	309	24.1	+24.1
Conservative	John Hanlon	235	18.3	−0.4
Liberal Democrats	Marjorie Richardson	169	13.2	+0.4
Majority		262	20.4	−17.1
Turnout		1,284	28.8	+1.3
Labour hold		Swing		

Dalston
Party	Candidate	Votes	%	±%
Conservative	Nicola Clarke	1,037	53.1	+9.6
Liberal Democrats	Colin Farmer	598	30.6	−13.7
Labour	Ann Warwick	319	16.3	+4.1
Majority		439	22.5	
Turnout		1,954	41.0	−2.3
Conservative hold		Swing		

Denton Holme
Party	Candidate	Votes	%	±%
Labour	Hugh McDevitt	836	66.5	+6.3
Conservative	Lynn Fleming	421	33.5	+8.1
Majority		415	33.0	−1.8
Turnout		1,257	27.9	−0.5
Labour hold		Swing		

Harraby
Party	Candidate	Votes	%	±%
Labour	Cyril Weber	776	45.0	−10.5
Conservative	Michele Gwillim	456	26.4	−18.1
BNP	David Fraser	262	15.2	+15.2
Liberal Democrats	Warren Allison	232	13.4	+13.4
Majority		320	18.5	+7.5
Turnout		1,726	36.2	+5.0
Labour hold		Swing		

Irthing
Party	Candidate	Votes	%	±%
Conservative	Ray Knapton	480	79.1	+2.6
Labour	Alex Faulds	127	20.9	−2.6
Majority		353	58.2	+5.3
Turnout		607	37.4	+3.7
Conservative hold		Swing		

Longtown and Rockliffe
Party	Candidate	Votes	%	±%
Conservative	John Mallinson	658	64.0	+3.3
Labour	Robert Dodds	370	36.0	+1.9
Majority		288	28.0	+1.4
Turnout		1,028	31.3	−0.8
Conservative hold		Swing		

Lyne
Party	Candidate	Votes	%	±%
Conservative	Jonathan Devlin	544	83.7	+1.0
Labour	Roger Horne	106	16.3	−1.0
Majority		438	67.4	+2.0
Turnout		650	41.0	+8.2
Conservative hold		Swing		

Morton
Party	Candidate	Votes	%	±%
Labour	John Bell	950	48.0	+5.4
Liberal Democrats	David McMillan	787	39.7	−9.3
Conservative	Lawrence Fisher	244	12.3	+12.3
Majority		163	8.2	
Turnout		1,981	41.6	+0.4
Labour gain from Liberal Democrats		Swing		

St. Aidans
Party	Candidate	Votes	%	±%
Labour	Reg Watson	750	51.3	+2.2
Conservative	James Layden	512	35.0	+4.1
BNP	Tony Carvell	200	13.7	+13.7
Majority		238	16.3	−1.9
Turnout		1,462	32.5	+1.4
Labour hold		Swing		

Stanwix Rural
Party	Candidate	Votes	%	±%
Conservative	James Bainbridge	1,047	77.7	
Labour	John Hale	300	22.3	
Majority		747	55.5	
Turnout		1,347	38.6	−0.8
Conservative hold		Swing		

Stanwix Urban
Party	Candidate	Votes	%	±%
Conservative	Jacquelyne Geddes	1,244	67.5	+9.1
Labour	Ross Warwick	599	32.5	+5.8
Majority		645	35.0	+3.3
Turnout		1,843	39.8	−0.9
Conservative hold		Swing		

Upperby
Party	Candidate	Votes	%	±%
Labour	June Martlew	677	47.3	
Liberal Democrats	James Osler	371	25.9	
Conservative	Mike Clarke	215	15.0	
BNP	Christine Williamson	168	11.7	
Majority		306	21.4	
Turnout		1,431	35.4	+3.5
Labour hold		Swing		

Yewdale
Party	Candidate	Votes	%	±%
Labour	Joseph Hendry	988	50.3	+7.8
Conservative	Gareth Ellis	978	49.7	+9.8
Majority		10	0.5	−2.0
Turnout		1,966	40.4	+2.2
Labour hold		Swing		
