= 2006 Carlisle City Council election =

2006 UK local government election

Map of the results of the 2006 Carlisle City Council election. Labour in red, Conservatives in blue and Liberal Democrats in yellow. Wards in grey were not contested in 2006.

The 2006 Carlisle City Council election took place on 4 May 2006 to elect members of Carlisle District Council in Cumbria, England. One third of the council was up for election and the council stayed under no overall control.

After the election, the composition of the council was:

- Labour 24
- Conservative 19
- Liberal Democrats 8
- Independent 1

== Background ==
Before the election the Conservatives ran the council with 20 seats and the backing of the 7 Liberal Democrats. Labour was in opposition despite being the largest group on the council with 24 seats and needed 3 gains to take control.

19 of the 52 seats on the council were being elected, with extra seats contested in Stanwix Rural and Upperby wards after the sitting councillors, Conservative Edward Firth and Labour's Caroline Watson, stood down. Labour were defending 9 seats, compared to 8 for the Conservatives and 2 Liberal Democrats. Candidates at the election included 11 independents standing to protest against the demolition of the Warwick Road cinema and the first candidate from the English Democrats Party in Belah ward.

Before the election top Labour targets were reported as being Morton and Castle from the Liberal Democrats and Belah from the Conservatives. The Conservatives were targeting Yewdale from Labour, while the Liberal Democrats aimed to take Dalston from the Conservatives.

== Election result ==
Labour remained the largest party on the council with 24 councillors after only one seat changed hands. The Liberal Democrats gained Dalston from the Conservatives, to go up to 8 seats, while the Conservatives dropped to 19 and there remained 1 independent. Overall turnout at the election was 34.6%, down from 42.6% at the 2004 election.

Following the election Michael Boaden became the new leader of the Labour group, after challenging the previous leader Heather Bradley. However Conservative Mike Mitchelson remained as council leader after being re-elected by 26 votes to 25 at the annual council meeting on 22 May. This came after the Liberal Democrats backed the Conservatives and Liberal Democrat Peter Farmer was elected mayor by the same margin.

Carlisle local election result 2006
Party	Seats	Gains	Losses	Net gain/loss	Seats %	Votes %	Votes	+/−
Labour	9	0	0	0	47.4	35.6	9,629	-2.4%
Conservative	7	0	1	-1	36.8	40.7	11,009	-0.4%
Liberal Democrats	3	1	0	+1	15.8	13.7	3,694	-2.0%
Independent	0	0	0	0	0	8.3	2,237	+3.8%
English Democrat	0	0	0	0	0	0.9	247	+0.9%
Green	0	0	0	0	0	0.8	222	0.0%

== Ward results ==
Belah
Party	Candidate	Votes	%	±%
Conservative	Sandra Fisher	976	54.3	−16.3
Labour	Grant Warwick	435	24.2	−5.2
English Democrat	Stephen Gash	247	13.8	+13.8
Independent	Charmain Hunt	138	7.7	+7.7
Majority		541	30.1	−11.0
Turnout		1,796	37.9	−9.0
Conservative hold		Swing		

Belle Vue
Party	Candidate	Votes	%	±%
Labour	Jessica Riddle	601	43.4	+0.9
Conservative	John Mallinson	582	42.0	+1.2
Independent	Linda Hargreaves	202	14.6	+14.6
Majority		19	1.4	−0.3
Turnout		1,385	32.6	−9.5
Labour hold		Swing		

Botcherby
Party	Candidate	Votes	%	±%
Labour	Anne Glendinning	602	55.5	−2.0
Conservative	Theresa Cartner	314	29.0	−13.5
Independent	Edna Croft	168	15.5	+15.5
Majority		288	26.6	+11.7
Turnout		1,084	24.3	−8.4
Labour hold		Swing		

Brampton
Party	Candidate	Votes	%	±%
Conservative	Michael Mitchelson	990	77.8	+15.5
Labour	Alex Faulds	282	22.2	+0.8
Majority		708	55.7	+14.8
Turnout		1,272	36.7	−6.5
Conservative hold		Swing		

Castle
Party	Candidate	Votes	%	±%
Liberal Democrats	Olwyn Luckley	632	54.0	−8.9
Labour	Ann Warwick	321	27.4	−9.7
Conservative	George Bain	149	12.7	+12.7
Independent	Donald Patterson	69	5.9	+5.9
Majority		311	26.6	+0.8
Turnout		1,171	28.3	−7.4
Liberal Democrats hold		Swing		

Currock
Party	Candidate	Votes	%	±%
Labour	Heather Bradley	663	56.2	−1.3
Conservative	Shaidat Danmole-Ellis	221	18.7	−7.9
Liberal Democrats	Marjorie Richardson	151	12.8	−3.1
Independent	Fiona Robson	144	12.2	+12.2
Majority		442	37.5	+6.6
Turnout		1,179	27.5	−7.1
Labour hold		Swing		

Dalston
Party	Candidate	Votes	%	±%
Liberal Democrats	Steven Tweedie	891	44.3	+0.7
Conservative	Lucy Crookdale	874	43.5	+0.0
Labour	Ross Warwick	246	12.2	−0.7
Majority		17	0.8	+0.8
Turnout		2,011	43.3	−10.8
Liberal Democrats gain from Conservative		Swing		

Denton Holme
Party	Candidate	Votes	%	±%
Labour	Paul Atkinson	780	60.2	−5.0
Conservative	Patricia Vasey	329	25.4	−9.4
Liberal Democrats	Janet Tootle	166	12.8	+12.8
Independent	Lynn Barlow	21	1.6	+1.6
Majority		451	34.8	+4.5
Turnout		1,296	28.4	−7.1
Labour hold		Swing		

Harraby
Party	Candidate	Votes	%	±%
Labour	Joseph Weedall	802	55.5	+7.9
Conservative	Nicola Clarke	643	44.5	+9.0
Majority		159	11.0	−1.1
Turnout		1,445	31.2	−6.4
Labour hold		Swing		

Longtown and Rockliffe
Party	Candidate	Votes	%	±%
Conservative	Raynor Bloxham	635	60.7	−1.5
Labour	Robert Dodds	357	34.1	−3.7
Independent	Andrew Blythe	54	5.2	+5.2
Majority		278	26.6	+2.2
Turnout		1,046	32.1	+3.1
Conservative hold		Swing		

Morton
Party	Candidate	Votes	%	±%
Liberal Democrats	John Farmer	961	49.0	−6.6
Labour	John Bell	837	42.6	−1.8
Independent	Philip Weir	165	8.4	+8.4
Majority		124	6.3	−4.9
Turnout		1,963	41.2	−5.8
Liberal Democrats hold		Swing		

St Aidans
Party	Candidate	Votes	%	±%
Labour	Anne Quilter	669	49.1	+0.2
Conservative	Lawrence Fisher	421	30.9	−7.4
Liberal Democrats	Olive Hall	193	14.2	+14.2
Independent	Colin Paisley	80	5.9	+5.9
Majority		248	18.2	+7.6
Turnout		1,363	31.1	−7.6
Labour hold		Swing		

Stanwix Rural (2 seats)
Party	Candidate	Votes	%	±%
Conservative	Marilyn Bowman	908		
Conservative	James Bainbridge	747		
Independent	Craig Nicholson	475		
Labour	John Hale	203		
Independent	Kathryn Bowstead	176		
Turnout		2,509	39.4	+9.2
Conservative hold		Swing		
Conservative hold		Swing		

Stanwix Urban
Party	Candidate	Votes	%	±%
Conservative	Elizabeth Mallinson	1,116	58.4	−4.3
Labour	Steven Bowditch	510	26.7	−10.6
Independent	Richard Hunt	286	15.0	+15.0
Majority		606	31.7	+6.2
Turnout		1,912	40.7	−10.2
Conservative hold		Swing		

Upperby (2 seats)
Party	Candidate	Votes	%	±%
Labour	David Wilson	665		
Labour	John Reardon	634		
Liberal Democrats	James Osler	373		
Conservative	Michael Clarke	322		
Independent	Haydn Charlesworth	165		
Turnout		2,159	31.9	−6.7
Labour hold		Swing		
Labour hold		Swing		

Wetheral
Party	Candidate	Votes	%	±%
Conservative	Neville Lishman	1,032	65.6	−8.1
Labour	Roger Horne	225	14.3	−12.0
Green	Lynn Bates	222	14.1	+14.1
Independent	Iain Wilson	94	6.0	+6.0
Majority		807	51.3	+4.0
Turnout		1,573	43.2	−6.8
Conservative hold		Swing		

Yewdale
Party	Candidate	Votes	%	±%
Labour	George Stothard	797	42.5	−8.4
Conservative	Gareth Ellis	750	40.0	−9.1
Liberal Democrats	Eileen Aldersey	327	17.4	+17.4
Majority		47	2.5	+0.8
Turnout		1,874	38.2	−4.4
Labour hold		Swing		
