= 2011 Carlisle City Council election =

2011 UK local government election

Map of the results of the 2011 Carlisle City Council election. Labour in red and Conservatives in blue. Wards in grey were not contested in 2011.

The 2011 Carlisle City Council election took place on 5 May 2011 to elect members of Carlisle District Council in Cumbria, England. One third of the council was up for election and the council stayed under no overall control.

After the election, the composition of the council was:

- Labour 24
- Conservative 22
- Liberal Democrats 4
- Independent 2

== Background ==
Before the election Labour were the largest party on the council with 23 seats, compared to 22 Conservatives, 5 Liberal Democrats and 2 independents. However the Conservatives ran the council in alliance with the Liberal Democrats. At the election one councillor stood down, Labour's Mary Styth, who had held Belle Vue ward.

18 seats were contested at the election, with Labour standing in all 18 seats, the Conservatives in 17, the Green Party in 8, Liberal Democrats 7, UK Independence Party 4, Trade Unionist and Socialist Coalition 4, British National Party 2 and the Communist Party in 1 seat. The candidates in Morton ward included Conservative Judith Pattinson, who was attempting to return to the council she had left in 2004, and the former Labour mayor John Metcalfe, who was standing as a Communist.

There were also going to be 6 independent candidates, however the former Conservative councillor for Belah, Alan Toole, withdrew on 5 April. The other independents included Andrew Hill, a campaigner against the redevelopment of the Sands Centre in Carlisle, and husband and wife Jonathan and Julia Devlin. Jonathan Devlin had been Conservative councillor for Lyne since 2007, but stood as an independent after the Conservatives began looking for other candidates to stand for the seat.

== Campaign ==
A big issue at the election were the cuts being made by the national Conservative and Liberal Democrat coalition, with Labour saying the Liberal Democrats in particular would suffer as a result. Other local issues included a redevelopment at Carlisle Lake District Airport and a proposed new housing estate in Crindledyke.

Labour targeted Castle ward, which the Liberal Democrats held, and where Labour had come close at the 2010 election. However the Conservatives hoped to challenge Labour in Belle Vue and Yewdale wards.

== Election result ==
Only one seat changed parties, with Labour gaining the only seat the Liberal Democrats had been defending, in Castle ward. This meant that Labour remained the largest party on the council with 24 councillors, but without a majority as the Conservatives remained on 22 seats, the Liberal Democrats had 4 and there were 2 independents.

The Liberal Democrats suffered a substantial drop in the share of the vote, with the party coming fifth in Currock ward and third in Morton, a seat the party had previously held. The Liberal Democrats said they had suffered as a result of entering the coalition government nationally, while the Labour group leader, Reg Watson, saw the results as giving Labour "a good chance" to take control at the 2012 election.

Following the election, Conservative Mike Mitchelson was re-elected as leader of the council by 26 votes to 25. Meanwhile, Joe Hendry became the new leader of the Labour group on the council taking over from Reg Watson, while the 2 independent councillors joined in an Independent group.

Carlisle local election result 2011
| Party | Seats | Gains | Losses | Net gain/loss | Seats % | Votes % | Votes | +/− |
|---|---|---|---|---|---|---|---|---|
| Labour | 10 | 1 | 0 | +1 | 55.6 | 43.3 | 12,102 | +6.9% |
| Conservative | 8 | 0 | 0 | 0 | 44.4 | 37.9 | 10,586 | -1.6% |
| Liberal Democrats | 0 | 0 | 1 | -1 | 0 | 6.0 | 1,671 | -7.5% |
| Independent | 0 | 0 | 0 | 0 | 0 | 4.5 | 1,251 | +2.2% |
| Green | 0 | 0 | 0 | 0 | 0 | 3.8 | 1,074 | +0.6% |
| UKIP | 0 | 0 | 0 | 0 | 0 | 2.0 | 563 | +1.3% |
| TUSC | 0 | 0 | 0 | 0 | 0 | 1.2 | 347 | -0.3% |
| BNP | 0 | 0 | 0 | 0 | 0 | 1.1 | 299 | -1.8% |
| Communist | 0 | 0 | 0 | 0 | 0 | 0.2 | 51 | +0.2% |

== Ward results ==
Belah
| Party | Candidate | Votes | % | ±% |
|---|---|---|---|---|
| Conservative | Trish Vasey | 1,033 | 49.2 | −8.5 |
| Labour | Karen Gallagher | 664 | 31.6 | −10.7 |
| Independent | Andrew Hill | 401 | 19.1 | +19.1 |
| Majority | | 369 | 17.6 | +2.2 |
| Turnout | | 2,098 | 42.2 | −28.3 |
| Conservative hold | | Swing | | |

Belle Vue
| Party | Candidate | Votes | % | ±% |
|---|---|---|---|---|
| Labour | Jackie Franklin | 912 | 55.4 | +12.5 |
| Conservative | Stephen Higgs | 734 | 44.6 | +10.2 |
| Majority | | 178 | 10.8 | +2.3 |
| Turnout | | 1,646 | 34.2 | −25.9 |
| Labour hold | | Swing | | |

Botcherby
| Party | Candidate | Votes | % | ±% |
|---|---|---|---|---|
| Labour | Terry Scarborough | 720 | 50.0 | +17.4 |
| Independent | Mike Middlemore | 432 | 30.0 | −14.4 |
| Conservative | Shaidat Danmole-Ellis | 287 | 19.9 | +2.3 |
| Majority | | 288 | 20.0 | |
| Turnout | | 1,439 | 30.5 | −24.5 |
| Labour hold | | Swing | | |

Burgh
| Party | Candidate | Votes | % | ±% |
|---|---|---|---|---|
| Conservative | John Collier | 556 | 57.5 | −16.8 |
| Labour | Robin Pearson | 222 | 23.0 | −2.7 |
| Liberal Democrats | Michael Gee | 114 | 11.8 | +11.8 |
| Green | Dallas Brewis | 75 | 7.8 | +7.8 |
| Majority | | 334 | 34.5 | −14.1 |
| Turnout | | 967 | 55.7 | +12.7 |
| Conservative hold | | Swing | | |

Castle
| Party | Candidate | Votes | % | ±% |
|---|---|---|---|---|
| Labour | Willie Whalen | 549 | 42.4 | +8.0 |
| Liberal Democrats | Colin Farmer | 438 | 33.8 | −1.2 |
| Green | Neil Boothman | 135 | 10.4 | +3.5 |
| TUSC | Joanne Beaty | 90 | 6.9 | +6.9 |
| BNP | Ben Whittingham | 84 | 6.5 | +6.5 |
| Majority | | 111 | 8.6 | |
| Turnout | | 1,296 | 29.3 | −24.5 |
| Labour gain from Liberal Democrats | | Swing | | |

Currock
| Party | Candidate | Votes | % | ±% |
|---|---|---|---|---|
| Labour | Abdul Harid | 829 | 57.1 | +7.1 |
| Conservative | Kevin Reynolds | 325 | 22.4 | −2.8 |
| BNP | Mike Ward | 123 | 8.5 | +1.9 |
| TUSC | Brent Kennedy | 104 | 7.2 | +3.7 |
| Liberal Democrats | Terence Jones | 71 | 4.9 | −9.8 |
| Majority | | 504 | 34.7 | +9.8 |
| Turnout | | 1,452 | 31.2 | −24.0 |
| Labour hold | | Swing | | |

Dalston
| Party | Candidate | Votes | % | ±% |
|---|---|---|---|---|
| Conservative | Nicola Clarke | 1,108 | 49.1 | +1.6 |
| Liberal Democrats | William Wyllie | 500 | 22.2 | −12.1 |
| Labour | Grant Warwick | 478 | 21.2 | +3.0 |
| UKIP | Robert Dickinson | 170 | 7.5 | +7.5 |
| Majority | | 608 | 27.0 | +13.9 |
| Turnout | | 2,256 | 47.2 | −27.5 |
| Conservative hold | | Swing | | |

Denton Holme
| Party | Candidate | Votes | % | ±% |
|---|---|---|---|---|
| Labour | Hugh McDevitt | 913 | 57.9 | +2.4 |
| Conservative | Barbara Eden | 332 | 21.1 | −9.4 |
| UKIP | Michael Owen | 101 | 6.4 | +6.4 |
| Liberal Democrats | David Wood | 96 | 6.1 | +6.1 |
| Green | Lynn Bates | 75 | 4.8 | +4.8 |
| TUSC | Amanda Jefferies | 60 | 3.8 | −5.4 |
| Majority | | 581 | 36.8 | +11.9 |
| Turnout | | 1,577 | 32.4 | −26.1 |
| Labour hold | | Swing | | |

Harraby
| Party | Candidate | Votes | % | ±% |
|---|---|---|---|---|
| Labour | Cyril Weber | 1,125 | 66.8 | +16.5 |
| Conservative | Hannah Dolan | 558 | 33.2 | +0.7 |
| Majority | | 567 | 33.7 | +15.9 |
| Turnout | | 1,683 | 33.9 | −27.6 |
| Labour hold | | Swing | | |

Irthing
| Party | Candidate | Votes | % | ±% |
|---|---|---|---|---|
| Conservative | Syd Bowman | 444 | 55.6 | −2.5 |
| Independent | Julia Devlin | 177 | 22.2 | +22.2 |
| Labour | Beth Furneaux | 177 | 22.2 | +5.3 |
| Majority | | 267 | 33.5 | +0.4 |
| Turnout | | 798 | 48.8 | −26.8 |
| Conservative hold | | Swing | | |

Longtown and Rockliffe
| Party | Candidate | Votes | % | ±% |
|---|---|---|---|---|
| Conservative | John Mallinson | 637 | 55.2 | +11.5 |
| Labour | Robert Dodds | 323 | 28.0 | +14.9 |
| UKIP | Elizabeth Parker | 147 | 12.7 | +12.7 |
| Green | Ian Brewis | 46 | 4.0 | +4.0 |
| Majority | | 314 | 27.2 | +20.9 |
| Turnout | | 1,153 | 33.8 | −30.2 |
| Conservative hold | | Swing | | |

Lyne
| Party | Candidate | Votes | % | ±% |
|---|---|---|---|---|
| Conservative | Judy Prest | 496 | 63.1 | −20.6 |
| Independent | Jonathan Devlin | 158 | 20.1 | +20.1 |
| Labour | Gerard Champney | 132 | 16.8 | +0.5 |
| Majority | | 338 | 43.0 | −24.4 |
| Turnout | | 786 | 48.5 | +7.5 |
| Conservative hold | | Swing | | |

Morton
| Party | Candidate | Votes | % | ±% |
|---|---|---|---|---|
| Labour | John Bell | 1,104 | 59.5 | +22.0 |
| Conservative | Judith Pattinson | 337 | 18.2 | +0.8 |
| Liberal Democrats | Deborah Clode | 219 | 11.8 | −23.3 |
| BNP | Gillian Forrester | 92 | 5.0 | −0.2 |
| Green | Elaine Bromley | 51 | 2.8 | +2.8 |
| Communist | John Metcalfe | 51 | 2.8 | +2.8 |
| Majority | | 767 | 41.4 | +39.0 |
| Turnout | | 1,854 | 39.3 | −27.0 |
| Labour hold | | Swing | | |

St. Aidans
| Party | Candidate | Votes | % | ±% |
|---|---|---|---|---|
| Labour | Reg Watson | 704 | 43.3 | −1.1 |
| Conservative | Stewart Blake | 471 | 29.0 | −0.5 |
| Green | John Reardon | 368 | 22.6 | +2.1 |
| Independent | Tony Carvell | 83 | 5.1 | +5.1 |
| Majority | | 233 | 14.3 | −0.6 |
| Turnout | | 1,626 | 34.5 | −23.7 |
| Labour hold | | Swing | | |

Stanwix Rural
| Party | Candidate | Votes | % | ±% |
|---|---|---|---|---|
| Conservative | James Bainbridge | 1,010 | 64.0 | +3.3 |
| Labour | Lee Sherriff | 306 | 19.4 | +1.1 |
| UKIP | Carol Weaver | 145 | 9.4 | +9.4 |
| Green | Charmian McCutcheon | 116 | 7.4 | +7.4 |
| Majority | | 704 | 44.6 | +5.0 |
| Turnout | | 1,577 | 42.6 | −29.0 |
| Conservative hold | | Swing | | |

Stanwix Urban
| Party | Candidate | Votes | % | ±% |
|---|---|---|---|---|
| Conservative | Jacquelyne Geddes | 1,156 | 50.0 | −3.5 |
| Labour | Kevin Parker | 947 | 41.0 | +7.0 |
| Green | Richard Hunt | 208 | 9.0 | −3.5 |
| Majority | | 209 | 9.0 | −10.5 |
| Turnout | | 2,311 | 48.2 | −27.9 |
| Conservative hold | | Swing | | |

Upperby
| Party | Candidate | Votes | % | ±% |
|---|---|---|---|---|
| Labour | Ann Warwick | 743 | 56.0 | +5.1 |
| Conservative | Georgina Clarke | 257 | 19.4 | −2.1 |
| Liberal Democrats | James Osler | 233 | 17.6 | −3.0 |
| TUSC | Daniel Thorburn | 93 | 7.0 | +7.0 |
| Majority | | 486 | 36.7 | +7.3 |
| Turnout | | 1,326 | 32.5 | −23.8 |
| Labour hold | | Swing | | |

Yewdale
| Party | Candidate | Votes | % | ±% |
|---|---|---|---|---|
| Labour | Joe Hendry | 1,254 | 59.7 | +10.4 |
| Conservative | Michael Randall | 845 | 40.3 | +0.0 |
| Majority | | 409 | 19.5 | +10.6 |
| Turnout | | 2,099 | 43.5 | −26.4 |
| Labour hold | | Swing | | |
