= Chris Sims (priest) =

Christopher Sidney Sims (born 9 September 1949, Shipley, West Yorkshire), is an Anglican priest, a retired Archdeacon of Walsall.

Sims was son of clergyman the Reverend Sidney Sims and his wife Dorothy. He was educated at Wycliffe Hall, Oxford and ordained priest in 1977. After a curacy at Walmsley, Sutton Coldfield (1977–80), he held his first incumbency as Vicar at Hay Mills, Birmingham (1980–88). He then served in Cumbria as Vicar of St Michael Stanwix with St Mark, Belah, Carlisle (1988–96), Rural Dean of Carlisle (1990–95), honorary Canon of Carlisle Cathedral (1991–96), priest-in-charge at All Hallows and Torpenhow, Boltonsgate with Ireby and Uldale, Bassenthwaite with Isel and Setmuir Pits (1996–2001), and Team Rector of Binsey Team Ministry (2001–03) and in Shropshire at Shrewsbury Abbey (2003–09), also serving as Rural Dean of Shrewsbury (2008–09) before his appointment as Archdeacon.

Sims retired on 29 September 2014.

Sims married in 1972 Catherine Virginia Thomson with whom he has three sons.

Church of England titles
Preceded by Bob Jackson	Archdeacon of Walsall	Succeeded by Sue Weller
