= 2012 Carlisle City Council election =

2012 UK local government election

Map of the results of the 2012 Carlisle City Council election. Labour in red, Conservatives in blue, Liberal Democrats in yellow and independent in light grey. Wards in dark grey were not contested in 2012.

The 2012 Carlisle City Council election took place on 3 May 2012 to elect members of Carlisle District Council in Cumbria, England. One third of the council was up for election and the Labour Party gained overall control of the council from no overall control.

After the election, the composition of the council was:

- Labour 27
- Conservative 20
- Liberal Democrats 2
- Independent 2
- Vacant 1

== Background ==
After the last election in 2011 Labour were the largest party with 24 seats, while the Conservatives had 22, the Liberal Democrats had 4 and there were 2 independents. However the Conservatives continued to lead the council with Liberal Democrat support, meaning that before the 2012 election Labour needed to make 2 gains to take control of the council. One seat was vacant at the 2012 election in Harraby after the death of Labour councillor Dave Weedall in April 2012.

17 seats were contested in 2012 and as well as Conservative and Labour candidates, there were also 11 candidates each from the UK Independence Party and the Green Party, 8 candidates from the Liberal Democrats, 2 independents and 1 candidate each from the Trade Unionist and Socialist Coalition and the British National Party. The election in Carlisle brought national politicians to support their parties, with both the Conservative Prime Minister David Cameron and the Labour Leader of the Opposition Ed Miliband visiting Carlisle during the campaign.

== Election result ==
Labour became the first party to have a majority on Carlisle City Council since 2003, after taking 2 seats each from the Conservatives and Liberal Democrats. This took Labour to 27 of the 52 seats on the council, while the Conservatives dropped to 20 councillors and the Liberal Democrats fell to 2 seats. There remained 2 independents and a further seat was vacant. Overall turnout at the election was 33.9%.

The Labour gains from the Conservatives came in Belle Vue and Yewdale wards, with Labour across the seats contested winning 4,530 more votes than Conservatives. Meanwhile, the Liberal Democrats only held one seat in Dalston, where sitting councillor Trevor Allison was re-elected, after losing two seats in Castle and Morton to Labour.

Following the election the Labour group leader Joe Hendry became the new leader of Carlisle City Council, while John Mallinson became leader of the Conservative group on the council, after defeating the Conservative leader of the council from 1999 to 2012, Mike Mitchelson, in a leadership election.

Carlisle local election result 2012
Party	Seats	Gains	Losses	Net gain/loss	Seats %	Votes %	Votes	+/−
Labour	10	4	0	+4	58.8	47.3	11,582	+4.0%
Conservative	5	0	2	-2	29.4	28.8	7,052	-9.1%
Liberal Democrats	1	0	2	-2	5.9	7.4	1,811	+1.4%
Independent	1	0	0	0	5.9	3.9	953	-0.6%
UKIP	0	0	0	0	0	6.9	1,692	+4.9%
Green	0	0	0	0	0	5.0	1,213	+1.2%
TUSC	0	0	0	0	0	0.4	97	-0.8%
BNP	0	0	0	0	0	0.4	88	-0.7%

== Ward results ==
Belah
Party	Candidate	Votes	%	±%
Conservative	David Morton	805	42.6	−6.6
Labour	Kevin Parker	759	40.1	+8.5
UKIP	Andrew Hill	247	13.1	+13.1
Green	Ian Brewis	80	4.2	+4.2
Majority		46	2.4	−15.2
Turnout		1,891	38.4	−3.8
Conservative hold		Swing		

Belle Vue
Party	Candidate	Votes	%	±%
Labour	Leslie Tickner	909	57.7	+2.3
Conservative	Michael Clarke	537	34.1	−10.5
Green	Richard Hunt	80	5.1	+5.1
Liberal Democrats	Terence Jones	49	3.1	+3.1
Majority		372	23.6	+12.8
Turnout		1,575	31.8	−2.4
Labour gain from Conservative		Swing		

Botcherby
Party	Candidate	Votes	%	±%
Labour	Michael Boaden	693	54.3	+4.3
Independent	Michael Middlemore	311	24.4	−5.6
Conservative	Shaidat Danmole-Ellis	141	11.1	−8.8
UKIP	Robert Strong	107	8.4	+8.4
Green	Lynn Bates	24	1.9	+1.9
Majority		382	29.9	+9.9
Turnout		1,276	27.1	−3.4
Labour hold		Swing		

Brampton
Party	Candidate	Votes	%	±%
Conservative	Stephen Layden	600	51.1	−3.4
Labour	Graham Bartlett	404	34.4	+11.9
UKIP	Christian Forster	171	14.6	+14.6
Majority		196	16.7	−14.8
Turnout		1,175	32.9	−32.7
Conservative hold		Swing		

Castle
Party	Candidate	Votes	%	±%
Labour	Elsie Martlew	663	56.8	+14.4
Liberal Democrats	Ian Walker	229	19.6	−14.2
Conservative	Kevin Reynolds	165	14.1	+14.1
Green	Neil Boothman	110	9.4	−1.0
Majority		434	37.2	+28.6
Turnout		1,167	26.0	−3.3
Labour gain from Liberal Democrats		Swing		

Currock
Party	Candidate	Votes	%	±%
Labour	Colin Glover	850	69.7	+12.6
Conservative	Stephen Higgs	185	15.2	−7.2
TUSC	Brent Kennedy	97	8.0	+0.8
BNP	Stephen Bingham	88	7.2	−1.3
Majority		665	54.5	+19.8
Turnout		1,220	26.7	−4.5
Labour hold		Swing		

Dalston
Party	Candidate	Votes	%	±%
Liberal Democrats	Trevor Allison	1,033	51.8	+29.6
Conservative	Michael Randall	481	24.1	−25.0
Labour	Sandra Warwick	305	15.3	−5.9
UKIP	Robert Dickinson	174	8.7	+1.2
Majority		552	27.7	
Turnout		1,993	41.6	−5.6
Liberal Democrats hold		Swing		

Denton Holme
Party	Candidate	Votes	%	±%
Labour	Joan Southward	848	62.7	+4.8
Conservative	Barbara Eden	229	16.9	−4.2
Green	James Tucker	120	8.9	+4.1
UKIP	John Warmingham	107	7.9	+1.5
Liberal Democrats	David Wood	49	3.6	−2.5
Majority		619	45.8	+9.0
Turnout		1,353	27.8	−4.6
Labour hold		Swing		

Great Corby and Geltsdale
Party	Candidate	Votes	%	±%
Conservative	Doreen Parsons	402	60.6	−10.1
Labour	Elizabeth Furneaux	261	39.4	+10.1
Majority		141	21.3	−20.1
Turnout		663	37.7	−1.3
Conservative hold		Swing		

Harraby
Party	Candidate	Votes	%	±%
Labour	Lee Sherriff	961	63.6	−3.2
Conservative	Hannah Dolan	299	19.8	−13.4
UKIP	Edward Haughan	130	8.6	+8.6
Green	Dallas Brewis	61	4.0	+4.0
Liberal Democrats	Michael Gee	60	4.0	+4.0
Majority		662	43.8	+10.1
Turnout		1,511	29.9	−3.0
Labour hold		Swing		

Hayton
Party	Candidate	Votes	%	±%
Independent	William Graham	642	75.8	+1.6
Conservative	Harry Cain	167	19.7	−6.1
UKIP	Michael Owen	38	4.5	+4.5
Majority		475	56.1	+7.6
Turnout		847	50.7	−3.8
Independent hold		Swing		

Morton
Party	Candidate	Votes	%	±%
Labour	Elaine Stevenson	1,167	65.7	+6.2
Liberal Democrats	Peter Noble	201	11.3	−0.5
UKIP	Arnold Blythe	189	10.6	+10.6
Conservative	Lawrence Fisher	175	9.9	−8.3
Green	Gillian Curwen	44	2.5	−0.3
Majority		966	54.4	+13.0
Turnout		1,776	36.9	−2.4
Labour gain from Liberal Democrats		Swing		

St. Aidans
Party	Candidate	Votes	%	±%
Labour	Lucy Patrick	669	50.8	+7.5
Green	John Reardon	276	21.0	−1.6
Conservative	Christine Finlayson	256	19.5	−9.5
UKIP	Robert Cakans	115	8.7	+8.7
Majority		393	29.9	+15.6
Turnout		1,316	27.7	−6.8
Labour hold		Swing		

Stanwix Urban
Party	Candidate	Votes	%	±%
Conservative	Paul Nedved	854	42.7	−7.3
Labour	Grant Warwick	710	35.5	−5.5
Green	Helen Davison	228	11.4	+2.4
UKIP	Carol Weaver	207	10.4	+10.4
Majority		144	7.2	−1.8
Turnout		1,999	41.9	−6.3
Conservative hold		Swing		

Upperby
Party	Candidate	Votes	%	±%
Labour	Donald Cape	843	72.8	+16.8
Conservative	Judith Pattinson	182	15.7	−3.7
Liberal Democrats	James Osler	133	11.5	−6.1
Majority		661	57.1	+20.4
Turnout		1,158	28.6	−3.9
Labour hold		Swing		

Wetheral
Party	Candidate	Votes	%	±%
Conservative	Barry Earp	844	56.1	−4.6
Labour	Roger Horne	318	21.1	−6.8
UKIP	Geoffrey Round	207	13.8	+2.3
Green	Michael Brader	135	9.0	+9.0
Majority		526	35.0	+2.2
Turnout		1,504	39.8	−35.7
Conservative hold		Swing		

Yewdale
Party	Candidate	Votes	%	±%
Labour	Karen Gallagher	1,222	59.2	−0.5
Conservative	Fiona Robson	730	35.4	−4.9
Liberal Democrats	Deborah Clode	57	2.8	+2.8
Green	Hazel Graham	55	2.7	+2.7
Majority		492	23.8	+4.3
Turnout		2,064	42.7	−0.8
Labour gain from Conservative		Swing		

== By-elections between 2012 and 2014 ==
=== Harraby ===
A by-election was held in Harraby on 21 June 2012 after the death of the longest serving councillor, Labour's Dave Weedall. The seat was held for Labour by Donald Forrester with a majority of 457 votes over Conservative Keith Mellen.

Harraby by-election 21 June 2012
Party	Candidate	Votes	%	±%
Labour	Donald Forrester	637	63.1	−0.5
Conservative	Keith Mellen	180	17.8	−2.0
UKIP	Eddie Haughan	90	8.9	+0.3
Liberal Democrats	Michael Gee	71	7.0	+3.0
Green	James Tucker	31	3.1	−0.9
Majority		457	45.3	+1.5
Turnout		1,009	19.9	−10.0
Labour hold		Swing		

=== Yewdale ===
A by-election was held in Yewdale on 5 September 2013 after the death of the former leader of the council, Labour's Joe Hendry. The seat was held for Labour by Tom Dodd with a majority of 263 votes over Conservative Christina Finlayson.

Yewdale by-election 5 September 2013
Party	Candidate	Votes	%	±%
Labour	Tom Dodd	716	48.7	−10.5
Conservative	Christina Finlayson	453	30.8	−4.6
UKIP	Mike Owen	257	17.5	+17.5
Liberal Democrats	Terry Jones	31	2.1	−0.7
Green	Charmain McCutcheon	14	1.0	−1.7
Majority		263	17.9	−5.9
Turnout		1,471	30.2	−12.5
Labour hold		Swing		

=== Dalston ===
A by-election was held in Dalston on 17 October 2013 after Conservative councillor Nicola Clarke resigned from the council as she was moving away from the area. The seat was gained for the Liberal Democrats by Michael Gee with a majority of 30 votes over Conservative Michael Randall.

Dalston by-election 17 October 2013
Party	Candidate	Votes	%	±%
Liberal Democrats	Michael Gee	506	37.2	−14.6
Conservative	Michael Randall	476	34.9	+10.8
Labour	Ruth Alcroft	186	13.7	−1.6
UKIP	Robert Dickinson	167	12.3	+3.6
Green	James Tucker	27	2.0	+2.0
Majority		30	2.2	−25.5
Turnout		1,362	28.3	−13.3
Liberal Democrats gain from Conservative		Swing		
