= 2008 Carlisle City Council election =

2008 UK local government election

Map of the results of the 2008 Carlisle City Council election. Conservatives in blue, Labour in red, Liberal Democrats in yellow and independent in light grey. Wards in dark grey were not contested in 2008.

The 2008 Carlisle City Council election took place on 1 May 2008 to elect members of Carlisle District Council in Cumbria, England. One third of the council was up for election and the council stayed under no overall control.

After the election, the composition of the council was:

- Labour 21
- Conservative 21
- Liberal Democrats 7
- Independent 1
- Vacant 2

== Background ==
Before the election the Labour Party held 25 seats, compared to 19 Conservatives, 7 Liberal Democrats and 1 independent. However the Conservatives had run the council since 1999, latterly with the support of the Liberal Democrats.

17 seats were scheduled to be contested, with Labour needing 1 gain to probably be able to take control. 3 councillors stood down at the election, Conservative Judith Prest from Brampton ward and Labour's John Reardon and Ray Warwick from Upperby and Yewdale wards respectively. As well as candidates from the Labour, Conservative and Liberal Democrat parties, there were also 9 candidates from the British National Party, 1 from the English Democrats and 4 independents, including the only sitting independent councillor, Bill Graham in Hayton.

== Campaign ==
Labour targeted the seat of Morton from the Liberal Democrats, while campaigning on pledges to establish a theatre/arts centre and to review the Carlisle Renaissance programme, which would see 100 new homes built every year for a decade. However the Conservatives aimed to take Belle Vue and Yewdale from Labour, and Dalston from the Liberal Democrat group leader Trevor Allison. The Conservatives defended their record in control of the council, pointing to council tax increases being kept down and increased recycling rates. Meanwhile, the Liberal Democrats promised to campaign against the closure of post offices.

During the campaign the British National Party candidate for Upperby, Les Griffiths, died and as a result the election in Upperby was postponed. In the week before the election one of the Labour councillors for Upperby, June Martlew, also died and as a result both seats were set to be filled at a by-election on 12 June after the main council election had taken place.

== Election result ==
The Conservatives gained 2 seats from Labour to move level with Labour on 21 seats. The Conservative gains came in Belle Vue by 62 votes and in Yewdale, which they took by 42 votes after having fallen 10 votes short in 2007. These were the first urban seats the Conservatives had held south of the River Eden since 2004. Elsewhere the Conservatives came within 66 votes of defeating the Labour group leader Michael Boaden in Botcherby and the Conservative parliamentary candidate for Carlisle parliamentary constituency, John Stevenson, easily held his seat in Stanwix Urban. The Conservatives put their gains down to the unpopularity of the national Labour government and saw the results as a good sign for the next general election, as they were 1,481 votes ahead of Labour in the wards that made up Carlisle constituency.

Meanwhile, the Liberal Democrats stayed on 7 seats after holding all 3 seats they had been defending, with their group leader Trevor Allison increasing his majority to 223 in Dalston, from just 1 when he took the seat in 2004. Independent Bill Graham was the only other candidate elected, holding his seat in Hayton comfortably, but the British National Party did come second in Currock, for the second election in a row, with an increased 28% of the vote. Overall turnout at the election was 38.1%, an increase from 35.5% in 2007.

Following the election Conservative Mike Mitchelson was re-elected as leader of the council, with the Liberal Democrats continuing to have a seat on the council executive.

Carlisle local election result 2008
Party	Seats	Gains	Losses	Net gain/loss	Seats %	Votes %	Votes	+/−
Conservative	7	2	0	+2	43.8	40.8	10,346	-1.8%
Labour	5	0	2	-2	31.3	30.6	7,743	-8.0%
Liberal Democrats	3	0	0	0	18.8	13.9	3,514	+2.0%
Independent	1	0	0	0	6.3	5.4	1,377	+3.8%
BNP	0	0	0	0	0	8.6	2,187	+3.6%
English Democrat	0	0	0	0	0	0.7	176	+0.3%

== Ward results ==
Belah
Party	Candidate	Votes	%	±%
Conservative	David Morton	1,212	66.6	+23.3
Labour	Elaine Thomson	431	23.7	−1.8
English Democrat	Stephen Gash	176	9.7	+4.6
Majority		781	42.9	+25.1
Turnout		1,819	38.1	−2.0
Conservative hold		Swing		

Belle Vue
Party	Candidate	Votes	%	±%
Conservative	Mike Clarke	682	42.1	+0.1
Labour	Ian Stockdale	620	38.2	−5.9
Liberal Democrats	Louise Winspear	163	10.1	−3.8
BNP	Glen Gardner	156	9.6	+9.6
Majority		62	3.8	
Turnout		1,621	36.1	+1.8
Conservative gain from Labour		Swing		

Botcherby
Party	Candidate	Votes	%	±%
Labour	Michael Boaden	509	36.1	−13.9
Conservative	John Blenkham	443	31.4	−1.0
Independent	Bobby Betton	313	22.2	+22.2
BNP	Karl Chappell	145	10.3	−7.3
Majority		66	4.7	−13.0
Turnout		1,410	30.8	+3.0
Labour hold		Swing		

Brampton
Party	Candidate	Votes	%	±%
Conservative	James Layden	913	75.1	−2.7
Labour	Alex Faulds	302	24.9	+2.7
Majority		611	50.3	−5.4
Turnout		1,215	34.8	−1.9
Conservative hold		Swing		

Castle
Party	Candidate	Votes	%	±%
Liberal Democrats	Jim Tootle	562	44.3	−9.8
Labour	Christopher Southward	299	23.6	−5.9
Conservative	Charlotte Arnold	206	16.2	−0.3
Independent	Simon Osman	202	15.9	+15.9
Majority		263	20.7	−3.9
Turnout		1,269	29.7	+2.1
Liberal Democrats hold		Swing		

Currock
Party	Candidate	Votes	%	±%
Labour	Colin Glover	692	46.2	+1.7
BNP	Brian Allan	420	28.1	+4.0
Conservative	Lawrence Fisher	286	19.1	+0.8
Liberal Democrats	Olive Hall	99	6.6	−6.6
Majority		272	18.2	−2.2
Turnout		1,497	33.6	+4.8
Labour hold		Swing		

Dalston
Party	Candidate	Votes	%	±%
Liberal Democrats	Trevor Allison	1,151	50.2	+19.6
Conservative	Gareth Ellis	928	40.4	−12.7
Labour	Grant Warwick	216	9.4	−6.9
Majority		223	9.7	
Turnout		2,295	47.4	+6.4
Liberal Democrats hold		Swing		

Denton Holme
Party	Candidate	Votes	%	±%
Labour	Joan Southward	627	43.5	−23.0
Conservative	Geoffrey Prest	347	24.1	−9.4
Independent	Allan Stevenson	188	13.1	+13.1
BNP	Rob Walker	170	11.8	+11.8
Liberal Democrats	Janet Tootle	108	7.5	+7.5
Majority		280	19.4	−13.6
Turnout		1,440	30.7	+2.8
Labour hold		Swing		

Great Corby and Geltsdale
Party	Candidate	Votes	%	±%
Conservative	Doreen Parsons	471	70.7	+9.5
Labour	Helen Horne	195	29.3	+29.3
Majority		276	41.4	+18.9
Turnout		666	39.0	−13.2
Conservative hold		Swing		

Harraby
Party	Candidate	Votes	%	±%
Labour	Carole Rutherford	685	41.7	−3.3
Conservative	Michele Gwillim	513	31.3	+4.9
BNP	Joyce Chisholm	272	16.6	+1.4
Liberal Democrats	Colin Farmer	171	10.4	−3.0
Majority		172	10.5	−8.0
Turnout		1,641	34.4	−1.8
Labour hold		Swing		

Hayton
Party	Candidate	Votes	%	±%
Independent	William Graham	674	74.2	−9.3
Conservative	Harry Cain	234	25.8	+9.3
Majority		440	48.5	−18.5
Turnout		908	54.5	−2.9
Independent hold		Swing		

Morton
Party	Candidate	Votes	%	±%
Liberal Democrats	Nan Farmer	799	35.6	−4.1
Labour	Ann Warwick	740	32.9	−15.1
BNP	David Barnes	466	20.7	+20.7
Conservative	Teresa Cartner	242	10.8	−1.5
Majority		59	2.6	
Turnout		2,247	47.2	+5.6
Liberal Democrats hold		Swing		

St. Aidans
Party	Candidate	Votes	%	±%
Labour	Lucy Patrick	661	42.2	−9.1
Conservative	Barbara Eden	453	28.9	−6.1
BNP	Tony Carvell	232	14.8	+1.1
Liberal Democrats	Paul Hendy	219	14.0	+14.0
Majority		208	13.3	−3.0
Turnout		1,565	34.1	+1.6
Labour hold		Swing		

Stanwix Urban
Party	Candidate	Votes	%	±%
Conservative	Andrew Stevenson	1,188	61.2	−6.3
Labour	Richard Thurn	511	26.3	−6.2
Liberal Democrats	Deborah Clode	242	12.5	+12.5
Majority		677	34.9	−0.1
Turnout		1,941	41.1	+1.3
Conservative hold		Swing		

Wetheral
Party	Candidate	Votes	%	±%
Conservative	Barry Earp	1,283	78.5	+12.9
Labour	Roger Horne	352	21.5	+7.2
Majority		931	56.9	+5.6
Turnout		1,635	43.8	+0.6
Conservative hold		Swing		

Yewdale
Party	Candidate	Votes	%	±%
Conservative	Fiona Robson	945	43.5	−6.2
Labour	Steven Bowditch	903	41.5	−8.8
BNP	Michael Elliott	326	15.0	+15.0
Majority		42	1.9	
Turnout		2,174	44.4	+4.0
Conservative gain from Labour		Swing		

== By-elections between 2008 and 2010 ==
=== Upperby ===
A by-election in Upperby was held on 12 June 2008 for 2 seats on the council, after the deaths of a British National Party candidate during the council election campaign, and then the death of Labour councillor June Martlew. Labour held both seats, with a reduced majority, thereby becoming the largest party on the council with 23 seats, compared to 21 for the Conservatives.

Upperby by-election 12 June 2008 (2 seats)
Party	Candidate	Votes	%	±%
Labour	Donald Cape	595		
Labour	Ann Warwick	515		
Liberal Democrats	James Osler	428		
Conservative	Georgina Clarke	346		
BNP	Brian Allan	321		
BNP	Alistair Barbour	278		
Conservative	Gareth Ellis	275		
Turnout		2,758	36.1	+0.7
Labour hold		Swing		
Labour hold		Swing		

=== Belah and Castle ===
By-elections were held in Belah and Castle wards on 5 March 2009, after the death of Conservative councillor for Belah, Sandra Fisher, in December 2008, and the resignation of Liberal Democrat councillor for Castle, Kimberly Hunter, in January 2009. Both seats were held by the defending party, Conservative Gareth Ellis in Belah and Liberal Democrat Colin Farmer in Castle, with Labour finishing second in both seats.

Belah by-election 5 March 2009
Party	Candidate	Votes	%	±%
Conservative	Gareth Ellis	700	46.4	−20.3
Labour	Paul Thurn	307	20.3	−3.4
Independent	Dave Miller	221	14.6	+14.6
BNP	Tony Carvell	142	9.4	+9.4
Liberal Democrats	James Osler	79	5.2	+5.2
Green	Hazel Bowmaker	61	4.0	+4.0
Majority		393	26.0	−16.9
Turnout		1,510	31.4	−6.7
Conservative hold		Swing		

Castle by-election 5 March 2009
Party	Candidate	Votes	%	±%
Liberal Democrats	Colin Farmer	465	36.0	−8.3
Labour	Steven Bowditch	304	23.5	+0.0
BNP	Alistair Barbour	255	19.7	+19.7
Conservative	Allan Stevenson	143	11.1	−5.2
Green	John Reardon	125	9.7	+9.7
Majority		161	12.5	−8.2
Turnout		1,292	30.4	−0.7
Liberal Democrats hold		Swing		
