= Diocese of Lichfield =

Diocese of the Church of England

Coordinates: 52.6855°N 1.8305°W

Diocese of Lichfield Dioecesis Lichfeldensis
- Coat of arms

- Flag

Location
- Ecclesiastical province: Canterbury
- Archdeaconries: Lichfield, Stoke, Salop, Walsall

Statistics
- Parishes: 429
- Churches: 582

Information
- Cathedral: Lichfield Cathedral
- Language: English

Current leadership
- Bishop: Michael Ipgrave, Bishop of Lichfield
- Suffragans: Tim Wambunya, area Bishop of Wolverhampton; Sarah Bullock, area Bishop of Shrewsbury; Matthew Parker, area Bishop of Stafford; Paul Thomas, Bishop suffragan of Oswestry (AEO)
- Archdeacons: Sue Weller, Archdeacon of Lichfield; Megan Smith, Archdeacon of Stoke; Liz Jackson, Archdeacon of Walsall; Nick Watson, Archdeacon of Salop

Website
- lichfield.anglican.org

The Diocese of Lichfield is a Church of England diocese in the Province of Canterbury, England. The bishop's seat is located in the Cathedral Church of the Blessed Virgin Mary and Saint Chad in the city of Lichfield. The diocese covers 4,516 km^{2} (1,744 sq mi) of several counties: almost all of Staffordshire, northern Shropshire, a significant portion of the West Midlands, and very small portions of Warwickshire and Powys (Wales).

Coat of Arms of the Diocese of Lichfield

== History ==
The Diocese of Mercia was created by Diuma in around 656 and the see was settled in Lichfield in 669 by the then bishop, Ceadda (later Saint Chad), who built a monastery there. At the Council of Chelsea in 787, Bishop Higbert was raised to the rank of archbishop and given authority over the dioceses of Worcester, Leicester, Lindsey, Hereford, Elmham and Dunwich. This was due to the persuasion of King Offa of Mercia, who wanted an archbishop to rival Canterbury. On Offa's death in 796, however, the Pope removed the archiepiscopal rank and restored the dioceses to the authority of Canterbury. In 803 the Council of Clovesho accepted this decision.

During the 9th century, the diocese was devastated by the Vikings. Lichfield itself was unwalled and had become rather poor, so Bishop Peter moved the see to the fortified and wealthier Chester in 1075. His successor, Robert de Limesey, transferred it to Coventry and the diocese was renamed the Diocese of Coventry and Lichfield. At this stage it also covered Derbyshire and most of Warwickshire. In 1539 the see was transferred back to Lichfield and the name was reversed to become the Diocese of Lichfield and Coventry.

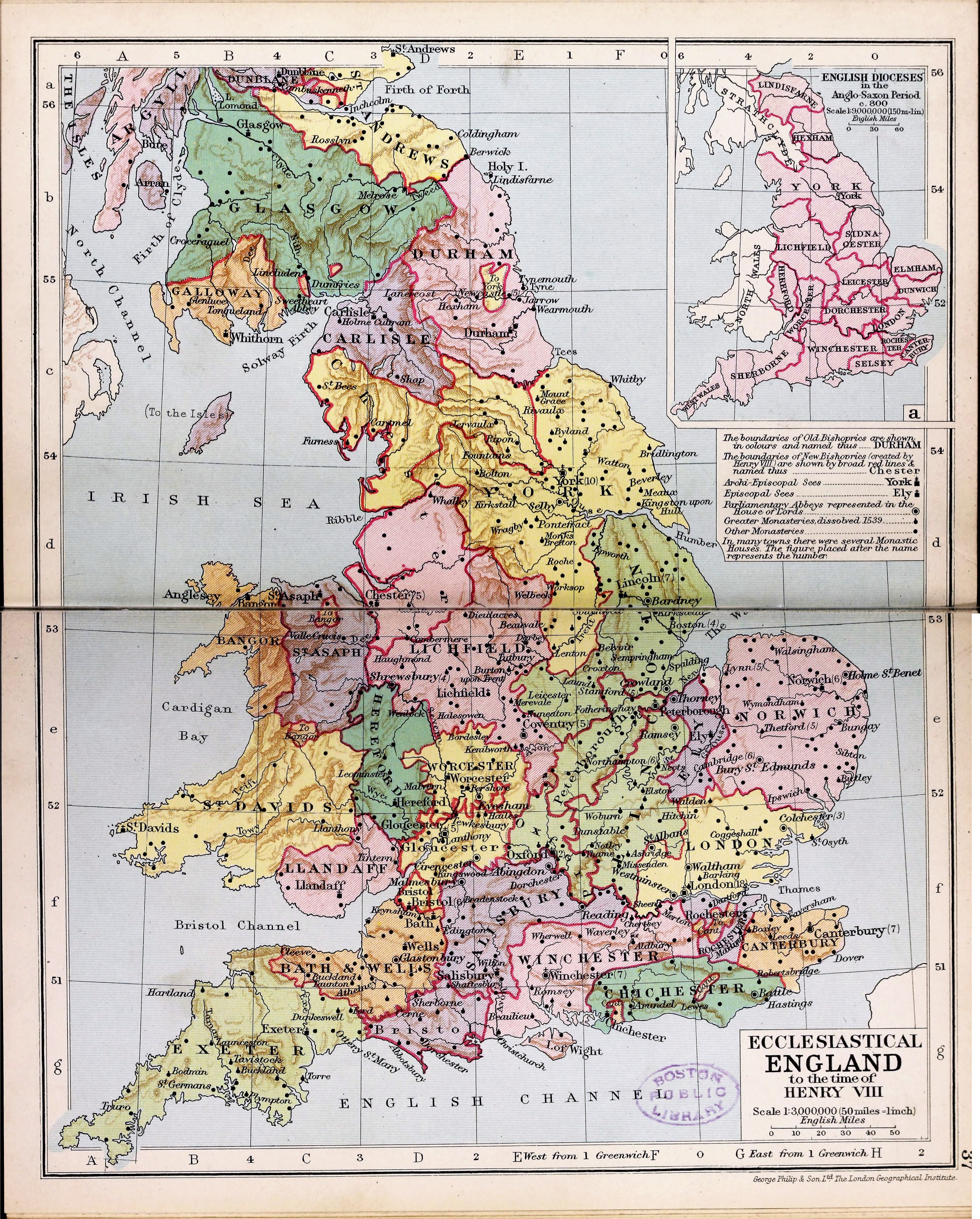
A map of the English dioceses during the reign of Henry VIII, from Phillips' new historical atlas (1920)

The diocese was one of the largest in medieval England and was divided into five archdeaconries roughly coinciding with the constituent counties or parts of counties: Chester (covering Cheshire and south Lancashire), Coventry, Derby, Salop and Stafford. In 1541 the Diocese of Chester was created and parishes in south Lancashire, Cheshire, Denbighshire and Flintshire were transferred to the new diocese. On 24 January 1837, the archdeaconry of Coventry was transferred to the Diocese of Worcester and the Bishop, see and diocese of Lichfield and Coventry all accordingly renamed Lichfield. In 1891 the Bishop of Coventry became a suffragan see (1891-1903), in 1918 a new Diocese of Coventry was recreated.

In 1848 the Diocese of Lichfield gained the territory of Wolverhampton, previously under the independent Dean of the Royal Peculiar St Peter's Collegiate Church of the town.

In 1884 the archdeaconry of Derby was transferred to the new Diocese of Southwell. In 1877 part of the archdeaconry of Stafford became the archdeaconry of Stoke-upon-Trent (now generally called merely Stoke) and in 1981 the remainder was renamed the archdeaconry of Lichfield. In 1997 another part of the archdeaconry (of Lichfield) was removed to form the new archdeaconry of Walsall, covering Trysull, Walsall, Wednesbury, West Bromwich and Wolverhampton.

== Bishops ==
The bishop diocesan is assisted by the area bishops of Shrewsbury (responsible for the Salop archdeaconry), Stafford (responsible for the Stoke archdeaconry), and Wolverhampton (responsible for the Lichfield and Walsall archdeaconries). The See of Shrewsbury was in existence from 1888 to 1905, then re-created in 1940; the See of Stafford was created in 1909, and the See of Wolverhampton in 1979. The diocesan area scheme was instituted in 1992.

In 2022, it was announced that the suffragan See of Oswestry in the diocese would be used as a provincial episcopal visitor (for traditionalist Anglo-Catholic parishes in the western half of the Province of Canterbury who reject the ministry of women). On 2 February 2023, Paul Thomas became the first Bishop of Oswestry and was consecrated a bishop.

There are also three retired bishops resident in (or near) the diocese who are licensed to serve as honorary assistant bishops:

- 2021-present: Alistair Magowan, former Bishop of Ludlow
- 2020–present: Jan McFarlane, former Bishop of Repton, is Dean of Lichfield
- 2005–present: Iraj Mottahedeh is a retired diocesan Bishop of Iran who lives in Church Aston, Shropshire, and is also licensed in the neighbouring Birmingham diocese.

== Archdeacons of Walsall ==
The archdeaconry of Walsall was created from Lichfield archdeaconry in 1997.

- 1997–2004 (ret.): Tony Sadler (afterwards archdeacon emeritus)
- 2004–2009 (res.): Bob Jackson
- 1 November 2009 – 29 September 2014 (ret.): Chris Sims
- 11 January 2015 – September 2019: Sue Weller (became Archdeacon of Lichfield)
- 8 November 2019 – 8 May 2024 (ret.): Julian Francis
- 4 May 2025 – present: Liz Jackson

== See also ==
- Bishop of Lichfield
- Lichfield Cathedral
- Dean of Lichfield
- Archdeacon of Salop
- Archdeacon of Stafford
- Archdeacon of Stoke
