= Tony Sadler =

Anthony Graham (Tony) Sadler (born Sutton Coldfield 1 April 1936), is an Anglican priest: he was the inaugural Archdeacon of Walsall.

He was educated at Bishop Vesey's Grammar School, The Queen's College, Oxford and Lichfield Theological College; and ordained in 1963. After a curacy in Burton upon Trent he held Incumbencies in Dunstall, Abbots Bromley, Pelsall and of Uttoxeter before his appointment as Archdeacon.

Church of England titles
Preceded by Inaugural appointment	Archdeacon of Walsall	Succeeded by Bob Jackson
