= Bob Jackson (priest) =

English Anglican priest (born 1949)

- Born: Robert William Jackson; 21 June 1949 (age 77); Sheffield, England
- Education: King's College, Cambridge; St John's College, Nottingham

Ecclesiastical career
- Church: Church of England
- Ordained: 1981
- Writings: Hope for the Church; Going for Growth; Everybody Welcome
- Offices held: Archdeacon of Walsall (2004-2009)
- Title: Reverend

Robert William Jackson (born 21 June 1949) is an English Anglican priest who has extensively researched, written and consulted on the subject of church growth.

== Biography ==
Jackson was born on 21 June 1949, in Sheffield. After reading Economics at King's College, Cambridge, he worked as an Economic Advisor to the Departments of Transport and Environment in Westminster. After training at St John's College, Nottingham he was ordained in 1981. He worked as a curate in Fulwood before becoming the Vicar of St Mark, Grenoside in 1984. In 1992, he became Vicar of St Mary, Scarborough at church, a role which he held until 2001.

From 2001 until 2004, Jackson was a member of Springboard, Archbishop George Carey's initiative to encourage, renew and mobilize the Church for evangelism. He became Archdeacon of Walsall and Bishop's Growth Officer for the Diocese of Lichfield in 2004, a role in which he put the ideas and research from his time at Springboard into practice.

In 2009, Jackson retired from his role as Archdeacon to concentrate on church growth consultancy.

== Selected works ==
- Matthew: The Story of a Faith Stronger than Death. Highland Books, 1987.
- Godspeed: 50 Primary Assemblies. R & S Educational Services, 1994. (with Alan Combes)
- till The Fat Lady Sings. Highland Books, 1996.
- Higher Than The Hills. Highland Books, 1999.
- Hope for the Church. Church House Publishing, 2002.
- Reveil danns l'Himalaya. Editions Emmaus, 2003 (French translation of Higher than the Hills)
- The Road to Growth: towards a thriving Church. Church House Publishing, 2005.
- Going for Growth: what works at local church level. Church House Publishing, 2006.
- Everybody Welcome. Church House Publishing, 2009. (with The Reverend George Fisher)

Church of England titles
Preceded by Tony Sadler	Archdeacon of Walsall	Succeeded by Chris Sims
