= Raffles, Cumbria =

Suburb of Carlisle, England

Coordinates: 54.89137°N 2.96708°W

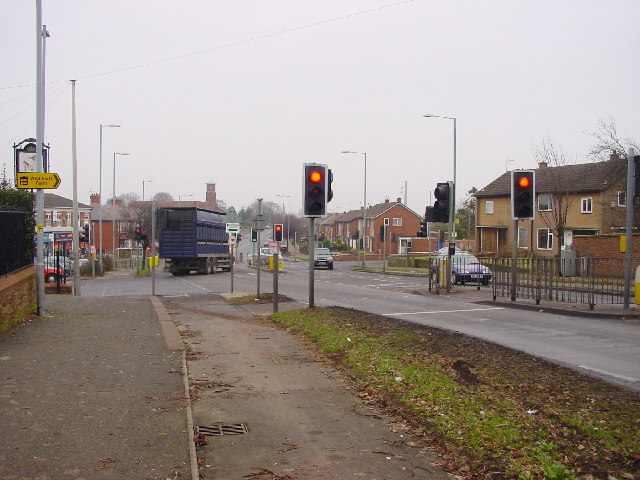
The minor road from the Raffles Estate and new housing areas meet the A595. Looking north-east towards Carlisle centre.

Raffles or the Raffles Estate is a suburb of Carlisle, Cumbria, England. The estate consists mainly of council built and Housing association properties, and in 1994 had a population of 5,800. Nearby areas include Belle Vue, Newtown, Sandsfield Park and Morton West.

== History ==
Raffles was built during the 1920s and 1930s and was highly sought after as a place to live by council tenants of the time. By 1994 the area had deteriorated; a report published in The Independent on Sunday in April 1994 condemned the estate as a no-go area with a high level of crime. One resident was reported to have said "If you've got a problem in Raffles, get yourself a shotgun".

By the first decade of the 21st century the housing estate had undergone significant redevelopment and modernisation. The £9 million redevelopment plan got underway in 2004 and saw many of the original council properties demolished and replaced with new housing stock. This was completed in three stages, the last building phase being finished in 2009. In 2010 Carlisle Police discovered a large amount of heroin at a house on the estate, described as one of the largest to be found in the area in recent years.

== Notable residents ==
- Margaret Forster (1938–2016), author, was born there.
- Helen Grant, the current MP for Maidstone and Malling and the Conservative Party's first black female MP. grew up on the estate.
- Jamie Littleton, the middling Rugby player and massive farmer, lived here whilst a baby.
