= Sue Weller =

British Anglican priest

Susan Weller was archdeacon of Walsall from 2014 to 2019, and then archdeacon of Lichfield.

She was educated at the University of Leeds. A marine biologist by profession, she was ordained deacon in 1996; and priest in 1997. After a curacy in Caverswall she was at Wilnecote from 2000 to 2005. After that her ministry took her to Rio de Janeiro until 2011 when she came to Wednesfield.

Church of England titles
Preceded by Christopher Sidney Sims	Archdeacon of Walsall	Succeeded by Julian Francis
