= Julian Francis =

Julian Montgomery Francis (born 1960) was Archdeacon of Walsall from 2019 until his retirement on 8 May 2024.

Francis was educated at Selwyn College, Cambridge, and ordained deacon in 1991; and priest in 1992. After a curacy in Wimbledon he was at West Bromwich, Coventry and Edgbaston.

Church of England titles
Preceded by Sue Weller	Archdeacon of Walsall	TBA
