= 1999 Carlisle City Council election =

1999 UK local government election

The 1999 Carlisle City Council election took place on 6 May 1999 to elect members of Carlisle District Council in Cumbria, England. The whole council was up for election after boundary changes increased the number of seats by one. The Conservative Party gained overall control of the council from the Labour Party.

== Election result ==
Carlisle local election result 1999
Party	Seats	Gains	Losses	Net gain/loss	Seats %	Votes %	Votes	+/−
Conservative	28			+14	53.8			
Labour	16			-16	30.8			
Liberal Democrats	6			+3	11.5			
Independent	2			0	3.8			
