= 2000 Carlisle City Council election =

2000 UK local government election

The 2000 Carlisle City Council election took place on 4 May 2000 to elect members of Carlisle District Council in Cumbria, England. One third of the council was up for election and the Conservative Party stayed in overall control of the council.

After the election, the composition of the council was:

- Conservative 30
- Labour 14
- Liberal Democrats 6
- Independent 2

== Election result ==
Carlisle local election result 2000
Party	Seats	Gains	Losses	Net gain/loss	Seats %	Votes %	Votes	+/−
Conservative	11			+2	57.9			
Labour	5			-2	26.3			
Liberal Democrats	2			0	10.5			
Independent	1			0	5.3			

== By-elections between 2000 and 2002 ==
Castle by-election 19 April 2001
Party	Candidate	Votes	%	±%
Labour		329	34.7	+6.0
Liberal Democrats		294	31.0	−18.2
Conservative		258	27.2	+5.1
Liberal		67	7.1	+7.1
Majority		35	3.7	
Turnout		948	21.9	
Labour gain from Liberal Democrats		Swing		
