= 2018 Carlisle City Council election =

Map of the results

The 2018 Carlisle City Council election took place on 3 May 2018 to elect members of Carlisle District Council in Cumbria, England. One third of the council was up for election and the council remained in no overall control.

== Overall result ==
Carlisle local election result 2018
Party	Seats	Gains	Losses	Net gain/loss	Seats %	Votes %	Votes	+/−
Conservative	8	1	0	▲1	47.1	44.0	10,648	▲12.7
Labour	8	0	1	▼1	47.1	39.7	9,603	▲7.5
Independent	1	0	0	Steady	5.9	5.6	1,353	0.0
Liberal Democrats	0	0	0	Steady	0.0	4.7	1,147	▲2.0
Green	0	0	0	Steady	0.0	4.5	1,076	▼0.8
UKIP	0	0	0	Steady	0.0	1.4	349	▼20.7

== Ward results ==
=== Belah ===
Belah
Party	Candidate	Votes	%	±%
Conservative	Gareth Ellis	902	50.4	▲8.0
Labour	Jeanette Bradley	429	24.0	▼3.6
Independent	Alan Toole	274	15.3	New
Green	Penelope Foster	114	6.4	▼0.8
UKIP	Philip Douglass	69	3.9	▼18.9
Majority		473	26.4	▲11.6
Turnout		1,790	37.3	▼1.9
Conservative hold		Swing		

=== Belle Vue ===
Belle Vue
Party	Candidate	Votes	%	±%
Labour	Jessica Riddle	925	57.2	▲16.5
Conservative	Melissa Andrews	693	42.8	▲10.2
Majority		232	14.4	▲6.3
Turnout		1,627	32.9	▲1.9
Labour hold		Swing		

=== Botcherby ===
Botcherby
Party	Candidate	Votes	%	±%
Independent	Robert Betton	827	57.2	▲4.9
Labour	Lisa Brown	482	33.4	▲9.2
Conservative	Linda Danielis	136	9.4	▲0.5
Majority		345	23.8	▼4.3
Turnout		1,448	32.8	▲1.0
Independent hold		Swing		

=== Brampton ===
Brampton
Party	Candidate	Votes	%	±%
Conservative	Mike Mitchelson	758	61.7	▲8.6
Labour	Maggie Robinson	276	22.5	▲4.0
Green	Sharon Seymour	108	8.8	▲0.2
Independent	Malcolm Craik	87	7.1	New
Majority		482	39.2	▲4.6
Turnout		1,229	33.8	▼2.4
Conservative hold		Swing		

=== Castle ===
Castle
Party	Candidate	Votes	%	±%
Labour	Anne Glendinning	587	56.3	▲19.0
Conservative	Paul Bradley	311	29.8	▲10.8
Liberal Democrats	David Wood	73	7.0	▼3.9
Green	Richard Hunt	72	6.9	▼0.6
Majority		276	26.5	▲12.1
Turnout		1,046	25.8	▼1.0
Labour hold		Swing		

=== Currock ===
Currock
Party	Candidate	Votes	%	±%
Labour	Sue Crawford	616	59.2	▲8.9
Conservative	Barbara Eden	271	26.0	▲9.5
UKIP	John Denholm	107	10.3	▼15.7
Green	Helen Atkinson	47	4.5	▲0.4
Majority		345	33.2	▲8.9
Turnout		1,043	23.7	▼2.0
Labour hold		Swing		

=== Dalston ===
Dalston
Party	Candidate	Votes	%	±%
Conservative	Ann McKerrell	1,119	52.3	▲19.9
Liberal Democrats	Michael Gee	658	30.7	▲9.3
Labour	Calvin Rodgerson	364	17.0	▲4.1
Majority		461	21.6	▲10.6
Turnout		2,145	37.2	▼8.0
Conservative hold		Swing		

=== Denton Holme ===
Denton Holme
Party	Candidate	Votes	%	±%
Labour	Christopher Southward	754	61.1	▲16.4
Conservative	Syed Ali	345	27.9	▲8.8
Green	Rob Morrison	136	11.0	▲1.6
Majority		409	33.2	▲11.5
Turnout		1,240	26.2	▼2.3
Labour hold		Swing		

=== Harraby ===
Harraby
Party	Candidate	Votes	%	±%
Labour	Paul Carrigan	742	53.6	▲10.8
Conservative	Geoff Mitchell	560	40.4	▲17.6
Green	Julian Oldfield	83	6.0	▲0.8
Majority		182	13.2	▼0.4
Turnout		1,389	27.6	▼2.8
Labour hold		Swing		

=== Longtown and Rockcliffe ===
Longtown and Rockcliffe
Party	Candidate	Votes	%	±%
Conservative	Raynor Bloxham	526	65.8	▲18.6
Labour	Paul Atkinson	213	26.6	▲7.9
UKIP	Fiona Mills	61	7.6	▼24.0
Majority		313	39.2	▲23.6
Turnout		803	25.2	▼4.2
Conservative hold		Swing		

=== Morton ===
Morton
Party	Candidate	Votes	%	±%
Labour	Colin Stothard	801	59.1	▲13.5
Conservative	Charles McKerrell	476	35.1	▲12.3
Green	Alan Peters	79	5.8	▲2.6
Majority		325	24.0	▲4.7
Turnout		1,359	29.2	▼4.2
Labour hold		Swing		

=== St Aidans ===
St Aidans
Party	Candidate	Votes	%	±%
Labour	Anne Quilter	662	55.3	▲15.0
Conservative	Geoffrey Osborne	379	31.7	▲11.6
Independent	Michael Middlemore	87	7.3	New
Green	Henry Goodwin	69	5.8	▼11.2
Majority		283	23.6	▲5.9
Turnout		1,200	27.6	▼1.9
Labour hold		Swing		

=== Stanwix Rural ===
Stanwix Rural
Party	Candidate	Votes	%	±%
Conservative	Marilyn Bowman	903	65.9	▲13.0
Labour	Christopher Robinson	292	21.3	▲3.4
Green	Sky Higgins	116	8.5	▲2.9
UKIP	John Harding	59	4.3	▼19.3
Majority		611	44.6	▲15.3
Turnout		1,372	33.5	▼4.6
Conservative hold		Swing		

=== Stanwix Urban ===
Stanwix Urban
Party	Candidate	Votes	%	±%
Conservative	Elizabeth Mallinson	1,083	53.0	▲8.7
Labour	Louise Atkinson	696	34.0	▲6.6
Green	Helen Davison	188	9.2	▼2.2
Independent	Claire Pearce	78	3.8	New
Majority		387	19.0	▲2.1
Turnout		2,048	44.0	▲0.1
Conservative hold		Swing		

=== Upperby ===
Upperby
Party	Candidate	Votes	%	±%
Labour	David Graham	640	60.7	▲7.9
Conservative	Linda Mitchell	292	27.7	▲12.1
Liberal Democrats	James Osler	122	11.6	New
Majority		348	33.0	▲5.8
Turnout		1,057	27.2	▼3.2
Labour hold		Swing		

=== Wetheral ===
Wetheral
Party	Candidate	Votes	%	±%
Conservative	Stephen Higgs	1,015	64.1	▲20.4
Labour	Robert Rynn	336	21.2	▲7.0
Liberal Democrats	Christopher Moss	116	7.3	▲5.4
Green	Dallas Brewis	64	4.0	▼0.7
UKIP	Geoffrey Round	53	3.3	▼15.0
Majority		679	42.9	▲17.5
Turnout		1,586	39.7	▼3.1
Conservative hold		Swing		

=== Yewdale ===
Yewdale
Party	Candidate	Votes	%	±%
Conservative	Robert Currie	879	47.6	▲18.0
Labour	Timothy Linford	788	42.7	▼1.5
Liberal Democrats	Jeffrey Coates	178	9.6	New
Majority		91	4.9	N/A
Turnout		1,846	39.6	▲0.3
Conservative gain from Labour		Swing		

== By-elections between 2018 and 2019 ==
Denton Holme by-election 6 September 2018
Party	Candidate	Votes	%	±%
Labour	Lisa Brown	647	62.5	+1.4
Conservative	Syed Ali	254	24.5	−3.4
Green	Rob Morrison	78	7.5	−3.5
UKIP	Phil Douglass	57	5.5	+5.5
Majority		393	37.9	
Turnout		1,036		
Labour hold		Swing		
