= 2004 Carlisle City Council election =

2004 UK local government election

Map of the results of the 2004 Carlisle City Council election. Labour in red, Conservatives in blue, Liberal Democrats in yellow and independent in light grey. Wards in dark grey were not contested in 2004.

The 2004 Carlisle City Council election took place on 10 June 2004 to elect members of Carlisle District Council in Cumbria, England. One third of the council was up for election and the council stayed under no overall control.

After the election, the composition of the council was:

- Labour 24
- Conservative 20
- Liberal Democrats 7
- Independent 1

== Election result ==
Labour became the largest party on the council with 24 councillors, but without a majority, after gaining 3 seats from the Conservatives in Belle Vue, St Aidans and Yewdale. However Labour did lose one seat to the Liberal Democrats in Castle, with the Liberal Democrats also gaining a seat from the Conservatives in Dalston by 1 vote. This meant the Conservatives dropped to 20 seats, while the Liberal Democrats went up to 7 and there remained 1 independent. Overall turnout at the election was 42.6%, up from 31.4% in 2003.

Following the election the Liberal Democrats continued to back the Conservatives to run the council, with Mike Mitchelson remaining as leader of the council.

Carlisle local election result 2004
Party	Seats	Gains	Losses	Net gain/loss	Seats %	Votes %	Votes	+/−
Labour	8	3	1	+2	47.1	38.0	10,957	-6.1%
Conservative	5	0	4	-4	29.4	41.1	11,844	0.0%
Liberal Democrats	3	2	0	+2	17.6	15.7	4,526	+1.1%
Independent	1	0	0	0	5.9	4.5	1,293	+4.2%
Green	0	0	0	0	0	0.8	220	+0.8%

== Ward results ==
Belah
Party	Candidate	Votes	%	±%
Conservative	David Morton	1,538	70.6	+11.3
Labour	Mohammed Harid	642	29.4	−11.3
Majority		896	41.1	+22.5
Turnout		2,180	46.9	+12.6
Conservative hold		Swing		

Belle Vue
Party	Candidate	Votes	%	±%
Labour	Ian Stockdale	740	42.5	−4.7
Conservative	George Bain	710	40.8	+5.6
Liberal Democrats	William Wyllie	291	16.7	+4.0
Majority		30	1.7	−10.3
Turnout		1,741	42.1	+12.9
Labour gain from Conservative		Swing		

Botcherby
Party	Candidate	Votes	%	±%
Labour	Michael Boaden	813	57.5	−3.2
Conservative	Gareth Ellis	602	42.5	+3.2
Majority		211	14.9	−6.5
Turnout		1,415	32.7	+6.7
Labour hold		Swing		

Brampton
Party	Candidate	Votes	%	±%
Conservative	Judith Prest	919	62.3	−8.8
Labour	John Hale	315	21.4	−7.5
Liberal Democrats	Steven Tweedie	241	16.3	+16.3
Majority		604	40.9	−1.4
Turnout		1,475	43.2	
Conservative hold		Swing		

Castle
Party	Candidate	Votes	%	±%
Liberal Democrats	James Tootle	917	62.9	+5.3
Labour	Steven Bowditch	541	37.1	−5.3
Majority		376	25.8	+10.5
Turnout		1,458	35.7	+11.0
Liberal Democrats gain from Labour		Swing		

Currock
Party	Candidate	Votes	%	±%
Labour	Colin Glover	865	57.5	−15.1
Conservative	James Bainbridge	400	26.6	−0.8
Liberal Democrats	Eileen Aldersey	240	15.9	+15.9
Majority		465	30.9	−14.2
Turnout		1,505	34.6	+11.5
Labour hold		Swing		

Dalston
Party	Candidate	Votes	%	±%
Liberal Democrats	Trevor Allison	1,048	43.6	+5.5
Conservative	Ann McKerrell	1,047	43.5	−2.0
Labour	Ann Warwick	310	12.9	−3.5
Majority		1	0.0	
Turnout		2,405	54.1	+13.7
Liberal Democrats gain from Conservative		Swing		

Denton Holme
Party	Candidate	Votes	%	±%
Labour	Joan Southward	1,044	65.2	−5.7
Conservative	Henry Stordy	558	34.8	+15.1
Majority		486	30.3	−20.8
Turnout		1,602	35.5	+8.6
Labour hold		Swing		

Great Corby & Geltsdale
Party	Candidate	Votes	%	±%
Conservative	Doreen Parsons	523	61.2	
Independent	Robert Wickings	331	38.8	
Majority		192	22.5	
Turnout		854	52.2	
Conservative hold		Swing		

Harraby
Party	Candidate	Votes	%	±%
Labour	Carole Rutherford	792	47.6	−19.7
Conservative	Michele Gwillim	590	35.5	+10.9
Liberal Democrats	Olwyn Luckley	282	16.9	+8.8
Majority		202	12.1	−30.6
Turnout		1,664	37.6	+9.3
Labour hold		Swing		

Hayton
Party	Candidate	Votes	%	±%
Independent	William Graham	778	83.5	
Conservative	Teresa Cartner	154	16.5	
Majority		624	67.0	
Turnout		932	57.4	
Independent hold		Swing		

Morton
Party	Candidate	Votes	%	±%
Liberal Democrats	Hannah Farmer	1,245	55.6	+5.3
Labour	John Bell	995	44.4	−5.3
Majority		250	11.2	+10.6
Turnout		2,240	47.0	+7.3
Liberal Democrats hold		Swing		

St. Aidans
Party	Candidate	Votes	%	±%
Labour	Lucy Patrick	842	48.9	−0.1
Conservative	Lawrence Fisher	659	38.3	−0.8
Green	Colin Paisley	220	12.8	+12.8
Majority		183	10.6	+0.7
Turnout		1,721	38.7	+7.9
Labour gain from Conservative		Swing		

Stanwix Urban
Party	Candidate	Votes	%	±%
Conservative	Andrew Stevenson	1,470	62.7	+6.1
Labour	Thomas Johnson	873	37.3	+8.1
Majority		597	25.5	−1.9
Turnout		2,343	50.9	+15.6
Conservative hold		Swing		

Upperby
Party	Candidate	Votes	%	±%
Labour	Caroline Watson	706	45.6	−18.2
Conservative	Nicola Clarke	397	25.6	+3.1
Liberal Democrats	James Osler	262	16.9	+3.1
Independent	Denis Devlin	184	11.9	+11.9
Majority		309	19.9	−21.4
Turnout		1,549	38.6	+8.4
Labour hold		Swing		

Wetheral
Party	Candidate	Votes	%	±%
Conservative	Barry Earp	1,295	73.7	−3.2
Labour	Roger Horne	463	26.3	+3.2
Majority		832	47.3	−6.5
Turnout		1,758	50.0	+12.6
Conservative hold		Swing		

Yewdale
Party	Candidate	Votes	%	±%
Labour	Raymond Warwick	1,016	50.9	−0.4
Conservative	Neville Lishman	982	49.1	+10.6
Majority		34	1.7	−11.1
Turnout		1,998	42.6	+8.6
Labour gain from Conservative		Swing		

== By-elections between 2004 and 2006 ==
A by-election was held on 24 November 2005 in Castle ward after the death of the Liberal Democrat group leader John Guest. Olwyn Luckley held the seat for the Liberal Democrats, who continued to hold the balance of power on the council.

Castle by-election 24 November 2005
Party	Candidate	Votes	%	±%
Liberal Democrats	Olwyn Luckley	538	59.3	−3.6
Labour	Jessica Riddle	370	40.7	+3.6
Majority		168	18.6	−7.2
Turnout		908	22.0	−13.7
Liberal Democrats hold		Swing		
