= 2014 Carlisle City Council election =

2014 UK local government election

Map of the results of the 2014 Carlisle City Council election. Labour in red, Conservatives in blue and independent in light grey. Wards in dark grey were not contested in 2014.

The 2014 Carlisle City Council election took place on 22 May 2014 to elect members of Carlisle District Council in Cumbria, England. One third of the council was up for election and the Labour Party stayed in overall control of the council.

After the election, the composition of the council was:

- Labour 29
- Conservative 19
- Liberal Democrats 2
- Independent 2

== Background ==
17 seats were contested in 2014 and four sitting councillors stood down at the election from Castle, Denton Holme, Harraby and Wetheral wards.

== Election result ==
Labour gained one seat from the Liberal Democrats to win 9 of the 17 seats contested. The Labour gain came in Castle ward and took Labour to 29 councillors, while the Liberal Democrats dropped to 2 seats on the council after failing to win any seats in 2014. The Conservatives also gained a seat in Dalston from independent Bryan Craig and thus won 7 seats in 2014 to have 19 councillors overall. There did remain two independent councillors however, as independent Rob Betton retained his seat in Botcherby. Meanwhile, the UK Independence Party failed to win any seats, but did come second in 10 of the 17 seats contested. Overall turnout at the election was 34.2%.

Carlisle local election result 2014
| Party | Seats | Gains | Losses | Net gain/loss | Seats % | Votes % | Votes | +/− |
|---|---|---|---|---|---|---|---|---|
| Labour | 9 | 1 | 0 | +1 | 52.9 | 32.2 | 8,394 | -15.1% |
| Conservative | 7 | 1 | 0 | +1 | 41.2 | 31.3 | 8,158 | +2.5% |
| Independent | 1 | 0 | 1 | -1 | 5.9 | 5.6 | 1,468 | +1.7% |
| UKIP | 0 | 0 | 0 | 0 | 0 | 22.1 | 5,741 | +15.2% |
| Green | 0 | 0 | 0 | 0 | 0 | 5.3 | 1,388 | +0.3% |
| Liberal Democrats | 0 | 0 | 1 | -1 | 0 | 2.7 | 705 | -4.7% |
| TUSC | 0 | 0 | 0 | 0 | 0 | 0.7 | 174 | +0.3% |

== Ward results ==
Belah
| Party | Candidate | Votes | % | ±% |
|---|---|---|---|---|
| Conservative | Gareth Ellis | 823 | 42.4 | −0.2 |
| Labour | Allan Stevenson | 535 | 27.6 | −12.5 |
| UKIP | Philip Douglass | 442 | 22.8 | +9.7 |
| Green | Claire Unwin | 140 | 7.2 | +3.0 |
| Majority | | 288 | 14.8 | +12.4 |
| Turnout | | 1,940 | 39.2 | +0.8 |
| Conservative hold | | Swing | | |

Belle Vue
| Party | Candidate | Votes | % | ±% |
|---|---|---|---|---|
| Labour | Jessica Riddle | 632 | 40.7 | −17.0 |
| Conservative | Nigel Christian | 505 | 32.6 | −1.5 |
| UKIP | Paul Chapman | 358 | 23.1 | +23.1 |
| Green | Gillian Curwen | 56 | 3.6 | −1.5 |
| Majority | | 127 | 8.2 | −15.4 |
| Turnout | | 1,551 | 31.0 | −0.8 |
| Labour hold | | Swing | | |

Botcherby
| Party | Candidate | Votes | % | ±% |
|---|---|---|---|---|
| Independent | Robert Betton | 773 | 52.3 | +27.9 |
| Labour | Ruth Alcroft | 358 | 24.2 | −30.1 |
| UKIP | Robert Strong | 217 | 14.7 | +6.3 |
| Conservative | Teresa Evans | 131 | 8.9 | −2.2 |
| Majority | | 415 | 28.1 | |
| Turnout | | 1,479 | 31.8 | +4.7 |
| Independent hold | | Swing | | |

Brampton
| Party | Candidate | Votes | % | ±% |
|---|---|---|---|---|
| Conservative | Michael Mitchelson | 700 | 53.1 | +2.0 |
| Labour | Gerard Champney | 244 | 18.5 | −15.9 |
| UKIP | Christian Forster | 206 | 15.6 | +1.0 |
| Green | Dallas Brewis | 113 | 8.6 | +8.6 |
| Liberal Democrats | James Osler | 56 | 4.2 | +4.2 |
| Majority | | 456 | 34.6 | +17.9 |
| Turnout | | 1,319 | 36.2 | +3.3 |
| Conservative hold | | Swing | | |

Castle
| Party | Candidate | Votes | % | ±% |
|---|---|---|---|---|
| Labour | Gerald Caig | 435 | 37.3 | −19.5 |
| UKIP | Robert Reid-Sinclair | 267 | 22.9 | +22.9 |
| Conservative | Kevin Reynolds | 221 | 19.0 | +4.9 |
| Liberal Democrats | Manwara Begum | 127 | 10.9 | −8.7 |
| Green | Richard Hunt | 87 | 7.5 | −1.9 |
| TUSC | Robert Charlesworth | 28 | 2.4 | +2.4 |
| Majority | | 168 | 14.4 | −22.8 |
| Turnout | | 1,165 | 26.8 | +0.8 |
| Labour gain from Liberal Democrats | | Swing | | |

Currock
| Party | Candidate | Votes | % | ±% |
|---|---|---|---|---|
| Labour | Heather Bradley | 599 | 50.3 | −19.4 |
| UKIP | Robert Scott | 310 | 26.0 | +26.0 |
| Conservative | Genna Martin | 197 | 16.5 | +1.3 |
| Green | Hazel Graham | 49 | 4.1 | +4.1 |
| TUSC | Brent Kennedy | 36 | 3.0 | −5.0 |
| Majority | | 289 | 24.3 | −30.2 |
| Turnout | | 1,191 | 25.7 | −1.0 |
| Labour hold | | Swing | | |

Dalston
| Party | Candidate | Votes | % | ±% |
|---|---|---|---|---|
| Conservative | Ann McKerrell | 707 | 32.4 | +8.3 |
| Liberal Democrats | David Wood | 467 | 21.4 | −30.4 |
| Independent | David Craig | 409 | 18.7 | +18.7 |
| UKIP | Robert Dickinson | 319 | 14.6 | +5.9 |
| Labour | Jo-Anne Williams | 281 | 12.9 | −2.4 |
| Majority | | 240 | 11.0 | |
| Turnout | | 2,183 | 45.2 | +3.6 |
| Conservative gain from Independent | | Swing | | |

Denton Holme
| Party | Candidate | Votes | % | ±% |
|---|---|---|---|---|
| Labour | Christopher Southward | 638 | 44.7 | −18.0 |
| UKIP | John Warmingham | 328 | 23.0 | +15.1 |
| Conservative | Barbara Eden | 273 | 19.1 | +2.2 |
| Green | James Tucker | 134 | 9.4 | +0.5 |
| TUSC | John Higginson | 54 | 3.8 | +3.8 |
| Majority | | 310 | 21.7 | −24.1 |
| Turnout | | 1,427 | 28.5 | +0.7 |
| Labour hold | | Swing | | |

Harraby
| Party | Candidate | Votes | % | ±% |
|---|---|---|---|---|
| Labour | Robert Burns | 662 | 42.8 | −20.8 |
| UKIP | Edward Haughan | 451 | 29.2 | +20.6 |
| Conservative | Lawrence Fisher | 353 | 22.8 | +3.0 |
| Green | John Reardon | 81 | 5.2 | +1.2 |
| Majority | | 211 | 13.6 | −30.2 |
| Turnout | | 1,547 | 30.4 | +0.5 |
| Labour hold | | Swing | | |

Longtown and Rockcliffe
| Party | Candidate | Votes | % | ±% |
|---|---|---|---|---|
| Conservative | Raynor Bloxham | 467 | 47.2 | −8.0 |
| UKIP | Susan Parker | 313 | 31.6 | +18.9 |
| Labour | Graham Bartlett | 185 | 18.7 | −9.3 |
| Liberal Democrats | Marjorie Richardson | 24 | 2.4 | +2.4 |
| Majority | | 154 | 15.6 | −11.6 |
| Turnout | | 989 | 29.4 | −4.4 |
| Conservative hold | | Swing | | |

Morton
| Party | Candidate | Votes | % | ±% |
|---|---|---|---|---|
| Labour | George Stothard | 734 | 45.6 | −20.1 |
| UKIP | William Bertham | 424 | 26.3 | +15.7 |
| Conservative | Charlotte Fisher | 368 | 22.8 | +12.9 |
| Green | Helen Atkinson | 51 | 3.2 | +0.7 |
| TUSC | David Barton | 34 | 2.1 | +2.1 |
| Majority | | 310 | 19.2 | −35.2 |
| Turnout | | 1,611 | 33.4 | −3.5 |
| Labour hold | | Swing | | |

St. Aidans
| Party | Candidate | Votes | % | ±% |
|---|---|---|---|---|
| Labour | Anne Quilter | 550 | 40.3 | −10.5 |
| UKIP | Michael Bradford | 309 | 22.6 | +13.9 |
| Conservative | David Shepherd | 274 | 20.1 | +0.6 |
| Green | Neil Boothman | 232 | 17.0 | −4.0 |
| Majority | | 241 | 17.7 | −12.2 |
| Turnout | | 1,365 | 29.5 | +1.8 |
| Labour hold | | Swing | | |

Stanwix Rural
| Party | Candidate | Votes | % | ±% |
|---|---|---|---|---|
| Conservative | Marilyn Bowman | 747 | 52.9 | −11.1 |
| UKIP | Carol Weaver | 333 | 23.6 | +14.2 |
| Labour | Elizabeth Furneaux | 253 | 17.9 | −1.5 |
| Green | Charmian McCutcheon | 79 | 5.6 | −1.8 |
| Majority | | 414 | 29.3 | −15.3 |
| Turnout | | 1,412 | 38.1 | −4.5 |
| Conservative hold | | Swing | | |

Stanwix Urban
| Party | Candidate | Votes | % | ±% |
|---|---|---|---|---|
| Conservative | Elizabeth Mallinson | 915 | 44.3 | +1.6 |
| Labour | Craig Nicholson | 566 | 27.4 | −8.1 |
| UKIP | Fiona Mills | 349 | 16.9 | +6.5 |
| Green | Helen Davison | 235 | 11.4 | +0.0 |
| Majority | | 349 | 16.9 | +9.7 |
| Turnout | | 2,065 | 43.9 | +2.0 |
| Conservative hold | | Swing | | |

Upperby
| Party | Candidate | Votes | % | ±% |
|---|---|---|---|---|
| Labour | David Wilson | 653 | 52.8 | −20.0 |
| UKIP | John Denholm | 316 | 25.6 | +25.6 |
| Conservative | Shaidat Danmole-Ellis | 193 | 15.6 | −0.1 |
| Green | Emma Hughes | 52 | 4.2 | +4.2 |
| TUSC | Daniel Thorburn | 22 | 1.8 | +1.8 |
| Majority | | 337 | 27.3 | −29.8 |
| Turnout | | 1,236 | 30.4 | +1.8 |
| Labour hold | | Swing | | |

Wetheral
| Party | Candidate | Votes | % | ±% |
|---|---|---|---|---|
| Conservative | Stephen Higgs | 727 | 43.7 | −12.4 |
| UKIP | Geoffrey Round | 305 | 18.3 | +4.5 |
| Independent | Ian Yates | 286 | 17.2 | +17.2 |
| Labour | Christine Bowditch | 236 | 14.2 | −6.9 |
| Green | Ian Brewis | 79 | 4.7 | −4.3 |
| Liberal Democrats | Henry Wheatcroft | 31 | 1.9 | +1.9 |
| Majority | | 422 | 25.4 | −9.6 |
| Turnout | | 1,664 | 42.8 | +3.0 |
| Conservative hold | | Swing | | |

Yewdale
| Party | Candidate | Votes | % | ±% |
|---|---|---|---|---|
| Labour | Steven Bowditch | 833 | 44.2 | −15.0 |
| Conservative | Christina Finlayson | 557 | 29.6 | −5.8 |
| UKIP | Michael Owen | 494 | 26.2 | +26.2 |
| Majority | | 276 | 14.6 | −9.2 |
| Turnout | | 1,884 | 39.3 | −3.4 |
| Labour hold | | Swing | | |

== By-elections between 2014 and 2015 ==
A by-election was held in Castle ward on 11 September 2014 after the death of Labour councillor Willie Whalen. The seat was held for Labour by Alan Taylor with a 152-vote majority over Conservative Robert Currie.

Castle by-election 11 September 2014
| Party | Candidate | Votes | % | ±% |
|---|---|---|---|---|
| Labour | Alan Taylor | 364 | 38.4 | +1.1 |
| Conservative | Robert Currie | 212 | 22.4 | +3.4 |
| UKIP | Fiona Mills | 208 | 22.0 | −0.9 |
| Liberal Democrats | Lawrence Jennings | 121 | 12.8 | +1.9 |
| Green | Richard Hunt | 42 | 4.4 | −3.1 |
| Majority | | 152 | 16.1 | +1.7 |
| Turnout | | 947 | 21.7 | −5.1 |
| Labour hold | | Swing | | |
