= 2015 Carlisle City Council election =

2015 UK local government election

Map of the results

The 2015 Carlisle City Council election took place on 7 May 2015 to elect members of Carlisle City Council in England. They occurred on the same day as other local elections.

== By-elections between 2015 and 2016 ==
Botcherby by-election 7 January 2016
Party	Candidate	Votes	%	±%
Independent	Jack Paton	381	51.1	+21.9
Labour	Stephen Sidgwick	250	33.5	+0.4
Conservative	Robert Currie	115	15.4	−5.4
Majority		131	17.6	
Turnout		746		
Independent gain from Labour		Swing		
