= 2016 Carlisle City Council election =

2016 UK local government election

2016 local election results in Carlisle

The 2016 Carlisle City Council election took place on 5 May 2016 to elect members of Carlisle City Council in England. This was on the same day as other local elections.

== By-elections between 2016 and 2018 ==
=== Castle (15 September 2016) ===
Castle by-election 15 September 2016
Party	Candidate	Votes	%	±%
Labour	Anne Glendinning	398	46.5	−3.4
Conservative	Melissa Andrews	228	26.7	+3.1
UKIP	Robbie Reid-Sinclair	107	12.5	−1.2
Liberal Democrats	Alison Hobson	88	10.3	+2.1
Green	Deborah Brown	34	4.0	−0.6
Majority		170	19.9	
Turnout		855		
Labour hold		Swing		

=== Castle (24 November 2016) ===
Castle by-election 24 November 2016
Party	Candidate	Votes	%	±%
Labour	Stephen Sidgwick	350	49.3	−0.6
Conservative	John North	194	27.3	+3.7
UKIP	Michael Story	79	11.1	−2.6
Liberal Democrats	David Wood	51	7.2	−1.0
Green	Neil Boothman	36	5.1	+0.5
Majority		156	22.0	
Turnout		710		
Labour hold		Swing		

=== Belle Vue (4 May 2017) ===
Belle Vue by-election 4 May 2017
Party	Candidate	Votes	%	±%
Labour	Pamela Birks	775	46.6	−12.7
Conservative	Rob Currie	771	46.4	+5.7
UKIP	Susan Riley	116	7.0	+7.0
Majority		4	0.2	
Turnout		1,662		
Labour hold		Swing		

=== Yewdale (4 May 2017) ===
Yewdale by-election 4 May 2017
Party	Candidate	Votes	%	±%
Conservative	Christina Finlayson	931	47.3	+8.3
Labour	David Graham	792	40.3	−1.0
Liberal Democrats	Jeff Coates	152	7.7	+7.7
UKIP	Malcolm Craik	92	4.7	−10.5
Majority		139	7.1	
Turnout		1,967		
Conservative gain from Labour		Swing		
