= 2019 Carlisle City Council election =

2019 UK local government election

- 2 May 2019

All 39 seats to Carlisle City Council 20 seats needed for a majority

	First party	Second party	Third party
Party	Conservative	Labour	Independent
Last election	22 seats, 44.0%	25 seats, 39.7%	4 seats, 4.0%
Seats won	17	15	4
Seat change	▼5	▼10	Steady
Popular vote	26,013	19,279	5,166
Percentage	39.8%	29.5%	6.3%
Swing	▼4.2%	▼10.2%	▲2.3%
	Fourth party	Fifth party	Sixth party
Party	Green	UKIP	Liberal Democrats
Last election	0 seats, 4.7%	0 seats, 1.5%	1 seat, 4.7%
Seats won	1	1	1
Seat change	▲1	▲1	Steady
Popular vote	5,940	5,350	3,028
Percentage	9.3%	8.3%	4.6%
Swing	▲4.6%	▲6.8%	▼0.1%
- Results by ward
Council control before election
No overall control
Council control after election
No overall control

The 2019 Carlisle City Council election took place on 2 May 2019 to elect members of Carlisle City Council in England. This was on the same day as other local elections.

Following the election, a Conservative administration was formed.

== Summary ==
=== Election result ===
2019 Carlisle City Council election
Party	Candidates	Seats	Gains	Losses	Net gain/loss	Seats %	Votes %	Votes	+/−
Conservative	39	17	N/A	N/A	▼5	43.6	39.8	26,013	–4.2
Labour	31	15	N/A	N/A	▼10	38.5	29.5	19,279	–10.2
Independent	8	4	N/A	N/A	Steady	10.3	6.3	5,166	+2.3
Green	13	1	N/A	N/A	▲1	2.6	9.3	5,940	+4.6
UKIP	13	1	N/A	N/A	▲1	2.6	8.3	5,350	+6.8
Liberal Democrats	6	1	N/A	N/A	Steady	2.6	4.6	3,028	–0.1
Putting Cumbria First	3	0	N/A	N/A	Steady	0.0	0.8	554	N/A

== Ward results ==
=== Belah & Kingmoor ===
Belah & Kingmoor
Party	Candidate	Votes	%
Conservative	David Morton	860	41.2
Conservative	Gareth Ellis	831	39.8
Green	Helen Davison	719	34.4
Conservative	Petricia Vasey	622	29.8
Independent	Alan Toole	558	26.7
Labour	Steven Bowditch	502	24.0
Labour	Jessica Riddle	387	18.5
Labour	Anne Quilter	362	17.3
UKIP	Niall Scott	351	16.8
Liberal Democrats	Michael Gee	218	10.4
Turnout		2,094	36.0
Conservative win (new seat)			
Conservative win (new seat)			
Green win (new seat)			

=== Botcherby & Harraby North ===
Botcherby & Harraby North
Party	Candidate	Votes	%
Independent	Robert Betton	1,016	54.1
Independent	Jeffrey Bomford	696	37.1
Independent	John Paton	647	34.5
Labour	Susan Crawford	503	26.8
Labour	David Graham	441	23.5
Labour	Mohammad Harid	415	22.1
UKIP	Jacklyn Hunton	326	17.4
Conservative	Lawrence Fisher	229	12.2
Conservative	Suzanne Greenwood	194	10.3
Conservative	Virginia Marriner	159	8.5
Green	Fiona Prior	149	7.9
Putting Cumbria First	Mark Smith	112	6.0
Putting Cumbria First	Laura Ward	76	4.0
Turnout		1,884	29.4
Independent win (new seat)			
Independent win (new seat)			
Independent win (new seat)			

=== Brampton & Fellside ===
Brampton & Fellside
Party	Candidate	Votes	%
Conservative	Michael Mitchelson	1,150	48.1
Independent	Raymond Tinnion	1,052	44.0
Conservative	Keith Meller	877	36.7
Green	Sharon Seymour	793	33.2
Conservative	Doreen Parsons	690	28.8
Labour	Elizabeth Furneaux	675	28.2
UKIP	Rosemary Logie	377	15.8
Turnout		2,402	37.9
Conservative win (new seat)			
Independent win (new seat)			
Conservative win (new seat)			

=== Cathedral & Castle ===
Cathedral & Castle
Party	Candidate	Votes	%
Labour	Anne Glendinning	817	46.6
Labour	Louise Atkinson	763	43.6
Labour	Christopher Robinson	695	39.7
Green	Richard Hunt	430	24.5
Conservative	Pauline Finlayson	364	20.8
UKIP	Michael Storey	336	19.2
Conservative	Kathleen Rowley	333	19.0
Conservative	William Stuart	303	17.3
Independent	Stephen Sedgwick	213	12.2
Liberal Democrats	David Wood	200	11.4
Turnout		1,761	26.0
Labour win (new seat)			
Labour win (new seat)			
Labour win (new seat)			

=== Currock & Upperby ===
Currock & Upperby
Party	Candidate	Votes	%
Labour	Colin Glover	798	47.1
Labour	Lucy Patrick	667	39.4
UKIP	John Denholm	556	32.8
Labour	Robert Rynn	555	32.7
Conservative	Max Graham	326	19.2
Conservative	Neville Lishman	293	17.3
Conservative	Hannah Dolan	283	16.7
Green	Sky Higgins	251	14.8
Liberal Democrats	James Osler	237	14.0
Turnout		1,703	25.5
Labour win (new seat)			
Labour win (new seat)			
UKIP win (new seat)			

=== Dalston & Burgh ===
Dalston & Burgh
Party	Candidate	Votes	%
Liberal Democrats	Trevor Allison	1,449	60.4
Conservative	Ann McKerrell	1,089	45.4
Conservative	John Collier	923	38.5
Conservative	Robert Mitchell	614	25.6
Green	Paul Cross	572	23.8
Labour	Erin Reed	469	19.5
UKIP	Philip Douglass	357	14.9
Turnout		2,411	40.8
Liberal Democrats win (new seat)			
Conservative win (new seat)			
Conservative win (new seat)			

=== Denton Holme & Morton South ===
Denton Holme & Morton South
Party	Candidate	Votes	%
Labour	Christopher Southward	734	43.9
Labour	Ruth Alcroft	725	43.4
Labour	Lisa Brown	690	41.3
UKIP	John Warmingham	376	22.5
Putting Cumbria First	Colin May	366	21.9
Conservative	Barbara Eden	336	20.1
Conservative	Robin Finlayson	336	20.1
Green	Robin Morrison	331	19.8
Conservative	Charles McKerrell	325	19.4
Turnout		1,686	26.5
Labour win (new seat)			
Labour win (new seat)			
Labour win (new seat)			

=== Harraby South & Parklands ===
Harraby South & Parklands
Party	Candidate	Votes	%
Labour	Lee Sherriff	721	39.2
Labour	Niall McNulty	689	37.5
Labour	Joanne Ellis-Williams	649	35.3
Conservative	Linda Mitchell	543	29.5
UKIP	Gillian Dobson	537	29.2
Conservative	Geoffrey Osborne	487	26.5
Conservative	Syed Ali	438	23.8
Green	Alan Peters	263	14.3
Independent	Fiona Kelly	236	12.8
Turnout		1,845	28.6
Labour win (new seat)			
Labour win (new seat)			
Labour win (new seat)			

=== Longtown & The Border ===
Longtown & The Border
Party	Candidate	Votes	%
Conservative	Valerie Tarbitt	1,028	56.5
Conservative	John Mallinson	906	49.8
Conservative	David Shepherd	885	48.6
Green	Henry Goodwin	471	25.9
UKIP	Fiona Mills	438	24.1
Labour	Peter Sunter	361	19.8
Turnout		1,825	30.9
Conservative win (new seat)			
Conservative win (new seat)			
Conservative win (new seat)			

=== Newtown & Morton North ===
Newtown & Morton North
Party	Candidate	Votes	%
Labour	Leslie Tickner	739	43.2
Labour	Pamela Birks	709	41.4
Labour	Calvin Rodgerson	647	37.8
UKIP	Robert Reid-Sinclair	459	26.8
Conservative	Hugh McKerrell	455	26.6
Conservative	Olive Bloxham	425	24.8
Conservative	James Porter	386	22.6
Green	Helen Atkinson	315	18.4
Turnout		1,728	25.2
Labour win (new seat)			
Labour win (new seat)			
Labour win (new seat)			

=== Sandsfield & Morton West ===
Sandsfield & Morton West
Party	Candidate	Votes	%
Conservative	James Bainbridge	976	40.8
Conservative	Christina Finlayson	878	36.7
Labour	Jeanette Bradley	867	36.2
Conservative	Robert Currie	835	34.9
Labour	Timothy Linford	732	30.6
Labour	Reginald Watson	646	27.0
UKIP	Hayley Wright	481	20.1
Liberal Democrats	Jeffrey Coates	423	17.7
Green	Penelope Foster	333	13.9
Turnout		2,408	34.3
Conservative win (new seat)			
Conservative win (new seat)			
Labour win (new seat)			

=== Stanwix & Houghton ===
Stanwix & Houghton
Party	Candidate	Votes	%
Conservative	Elizabeth Mallinson	1,292	50.2
Conservative	Fiona Robson	1,134	44.1
Conservative	Paul Nedved	1,131	44.0
Green	John Reardon	720	28.0
Labour	Joanne Burke	695	27.0
Labour	Julie Simpson	668	26.0
Labour	Afsah Oomar-Snaith	507	19.7
UKIP	John Harding	426	16.6
Turnout		2,590	38.7
Conservative win (new seat)			
Conservative win (new seat)			
Conservative win (new seat)			

=== Wetheral & Corby ===
Wetheral & Corby
Party	Candidate	Votes	%
Conservative	Stephen Higgs	1,101	48.8
Conservative	Nigel Christian	1,023	45.3
Conservative	Marilyn Bowman	953	42.2
Independent	William Graham	649	28.8
Green	Dallas Brewis	593	26.3
Liberal Democrats	Christopher Moss	501	22.2
Labour	George Stothard	451	20.0
UKIP	Geoffrey Round	330	14.6
Turnout		2,262	40.2
Conservative win (new seat)			
Conservative win (new seat)			
Conservative win (new seat)			

== By-elections ==
The consultation on local reorganisation in Cumbria meant that Carlisle City Council elections did not go ahead as planned. However, elections for the vacant seats on local councils were still held due to the resignations of 3 Labour councillors. These were - Cathedral & Castle ward, Harraby South & Parklands and Newtown & Morton North city ward. The elections were held on Thursday 6 May 2021 which saw 2 Conservative Party gains in the City Council.

Following the death of UKIP councillor John Denholm, a by-election was held for Currock & Upperby. A by-election was held in Longtown and the Border following the death of Conservative councillor Valerie Tarbitt.

=== Cathedral and Castle ===
Cathedral & Castle by-election 2021
Party	Candidate	Votes	%	±%
Labour	Pete Sunter	673	39.3	−0.4
Conservative	Hugh McKerrell	599	35.0	+14.2
Green	Gavin Hawkton	299	17.5	−7.0
Liberal Democrats	Stuart Kelly	95	5.5	−5.9
Reform	Eloise Hurren	49	2.9	N/A
Turnout		1,720	25.9	−0.1
Labour hold		Swing		

=== Harraby South and Parklands ===
Harraby South & Parklands by-election 2021
Party	Candidate	Votes	%	±%
Conservative	Linda Mitchell	1,032	54.0	+24.5
Labour	Abdul Harid	752	39.3	+1.8
Green	Anne Gadsden	132	6.9	−7.4
Turnout		1,926	26.4	−2.2
Conservative gain from Labour		Swing		

=== Newtown and Morton North ===
Newtown & Morton North by-election 2021
Party	Candidate	Votes	%	±%
Conservative	Neville Lishman	883	49.3	+22.7
Labour	Dave Graham	767	42.8	+5.0
Green	Fiona Prior	101	5.6	−12.8
TUSC	Brent Kennedy	40	2.2	N/A
Turnout		1,805	29.0	+3.8
Conservative gain from Labour		Swing		

=== Currock and Upperby ===
Currock and Upperby by-election, 28 October 2021
Party	Candidate	Votes	%	±%
Labour	Chris Wills	636	57.5	+24.8
Conservative	Geoff Mitchell	412	37.2	+18.0
Green	Tom Adams	59	5.3	−9.5
Turnout		1,107		
Labour gain from UKIP		Swing		

=== Longtown and the Border ===
Longtown and the Border by-election, 5 May 2022
Party	Candidate	Votes	%	±%
Liberal Democrats	Timothy Pickstone	1,247	56.8	+56.8
Conservative	Sam Bown	948	43.2	−1.5
Turnout		2,195		
Liberal Democrats gain from Conservative		Swing		
