= 2010 Carlisle City Council election =

2010 UK local government election

Map of the results of the 2010 Carlisle City Council election. Conservatives in blue, Labour in red, Liberal Democrats in yellow and independent in light grey. Wards in dark grey were not contested in 2010.

The 2010 Carlisle City Council election took place on 6 May 2010 to elect members of Carlisle District Council in Cumbria, England. One third of the council was up for election and the council stayed under no overall control.

After the election, the composition of the council was:

- Labour 23
- Conservative 22
- Liberal Democrats 5
- Independent 2

== Background ==
Before the election Labour were the largest party with 23 councillors, compared to 21 Conservatives, 7 Liberal Democrats and 1 independent. However the council was run by a coalition between the Conservatives and Liberal Democrats.

18 seats were being contested at the election by a total of 68 candidates. Both the Conservative and Labour parties stood in all 18 seats, while there were 10 Liberal Democrat candidates, 9 British National Party, 6 Green Party, 5 Trade Unionist and Socialist Coalition, 1 UK Independence Party and 1 independent. The Socialist and Trade Union candidates included 2 former Labour mayors, Craig Johnston and John Metcalfe, while the independent Robert Betton had won Botcherby on Cumbria County Council at the 2009 election and was facing the same Labour opponent, Anne Glendinning, as in 2009.

== Election result ==
No party won a majority, with Labour remaining the largest party on 23 seats, but the Conservatives gained a seat to move to 22 councillors. The Liberal Democrats lost 2 seats to drop to 5 councillors, while a second independent councillor was elected to the council. Overall turnout at the election was 64.5%, up from 38.1% in 2008. This was as the election took place at the same time as the general election, where Conservative John Stevenson gained Carlisle constituency from Labour by 853 votes.

Labour gained Morton from the Liberal Democrats, defeating the Liberal Democrat group leader Peter Farmer, who announced his retirement from politics after his defeat. However Labour fell 14 votes short of taking Castle from the Liberal Democrats and lost Botcherby to independent Robert Betton. Meanwhile, the Conservatives gained Dalston from the Liberal Democrats, after the sitting Liberal Democrat councillor Steven Tweedie stepped down at the election.

Following the election Reg Watson became the new leader of the Labour group on the council, as Michael Boaden had stepped down after being defeated as Labour candidate at the general election. Conservative Mike Mitchelson, who held his seat at the election, was re-elected as leader of the council, continuing the alliance with the Liberal Democrats.

Carlisle local election result 2010
Party	Seats	Gains	Losses	Net gain/loss	Seats %	Votes %	Votes	+/−
Conservative	8	1	0	+1	44.4	39.5	19,430	-1.3%
Labour	8	1	1	0	44.4	36.4	17,931	+5.8%
Liberal Democrats	1	0	2	-2	5.6	13.5	6,646	-0.4%
Independent	1	1	0	+1	5.6	2.3	1,119	-3.1%
Green	0	0	0	0	0	3.2	1,588	+3.2%
BNP	0	0	0	0	0	2.9	1,418	-5.7%
TUSC	0	0	0	0	0	1.5	738	+1.5%
UKIP	0	0	0	0	0	0.7	326	+0.7%

== Ward results ==
Belah
Party	Candidate	Votes	%	±%
Conservative	Gareth Ellis	1,961	57.7	−8.9
Labour	Graham Bartlett	1,438	42.3	+18.6
Majority		523	15.4	−27.5
Turnout		3,399	70.5	+32.4
Conservative hold		Swing		

Belle Vue
Party	Candidate	Votes	%	±%
Labour	Jessica Riddle	1,209	42.9	+0.8
Conservative	Paul Nedved	970	34.4	−3.8
Liberal Democrats	Deborah Clode	447	15.9	+5.8
BNP	Stephen Bingham	126	4.5	−5.1
Green	Hazel Bowmaker	67	2.4	+2.4
Majority		239	8.5	
Turnout		2,819	60.1	+24.0
Labour hold		Swing		

Botcherby
Party	Candidate	Votes	%	±%
Independent	Robert Betton	1,119	44.4	+22.2
Labour	Anne Glendinning	822	32.6	−3.5
Conservative	Hannah Dolan	443	17.6	−13.8
BNP	Karl Chappell	134	5.3	−5.0
Majority		297	11.8	
Turnout		2,518	55.0	+24.2
Independent gain from Labour		Swing		

Brampton
Party	Candidate	Votes	%	±%
Conservative	Mike Mitchelson	1,266	54.5	−20.6
Liberal Democrats	George Eltherington	535	23.0	+23.0
Labour	Jamie Hendry	522	22.5	−2.4
Majority		731	31.5	−18.8
Turnout		2,323	65.6	+30.8
Conservative hold		Swing		

Castle
Party	Candidate	Votes	%	±%
Liberal Democrats	Olwyn Luckley	816	35.0	−9.3
Labour	Willie Whalen	802	34.4	+10.8
Conservative	David Horley	553	23.7	+7.5
Green	Stephen Graham	161	6.9	+6.9
Majority		14	0.6	−20.1
Turnout		2,332	53.8	+24.1
Liberal Democrats hold		Swing		

Currock
Party	Candidate	Votes	%	±%
Labour	Heather Bradley	1,263	50.0	+3.8
Conservative	Mark Hodgson	635	25.2	+6.1
Liberal Democrats	Terence Jones	371	14.7	+8.1
BNP	Ben Whittingham	167	6.6	−21.5
TUSC	Brent Kennedy	88	3.5	+3.5
Majority		628	24.9	+6.7
Turnout		2,524	55.2	+21.6
Labour hold		Swing		

Dalston
Party	Candidate	Votes	%	±%
Conservative	David Craig	1,715	47.5	+7.1
Liberal Democrats	John Wyllie	1,241	34.3	−15.9
Labour	Grant Warwick	658	18.2	+8.8
Majority		474	13.1	
Turnout		3,614	74.7	+27.3
Conservative gain from Liberal Democrats		Swing		

Denton Holme
Party	Candidate	Votes	%	±%
Labour	Paul Atkinson	1,530	55.5	+12.0
Conservative	Barbara Eden	842	30.5	+6.4
TUSC	John Metcalfe	253	9.2	+9.2
BNP	Glen Gardner	133	4.8	−7.0
Majority		688	24.9	+5.5
Turnout		2,758	58.5	+26.8
Labour hold		Swing		

Harraby
Party	Candidate	Votes	%	±%
Labour	Dave Weedall	1,495	50.3	+8.6
Conservative	Virginia Marriner	966	32.5	+1.2
BNP	David Fraser	258	8.7	−7.9
Green	Arthur Paynter	185	6.2	+6.2
TUSC	Martin Robertshaw	71	2.4	+2.4
Majority		529	17.8	+7.3
Turnout		2,975	61.5	+27.1
Labour hold		Swing		

Irthing
Party	Candidate	Votes	%	±%
Conservative	Syd Bowman	710	58.1	−21.0
Liberal Democrats	Christine Eltherington	306	25.0	+25.0
Labour	Beth Furneaux	206	16.9	−4.0
Majority		404	33.1	−25.1
Turnout		1,222	75.6	+38.2
Conservative hold		Swing		

Longtown and Rockcliffe
Party	Candidate	Votes	%	±%
Conservative	Ray Bloxham	935	43.7	−20.3
Liberal Democrats	Ian Highmore	800	37.4	+37.4
Labour	Helen Horne	281	13.1	−22.9
BNP	Chris Davidson	124	5.8	+5.8
Majority		135	6.3	−21.7
Turnout		2,140	64.0	+32.7
Conservative hold		Swing		

Morton
Party	Candidate	Votes	%	±%
Labour	Colin Stothard	1,180	37.5	+4.6
Liberal Democrats	Peter Farmer	1,105	35.1	−0.5
Conservative	Michael Randall	546	17.4	+6.6
BNP	Gillian Forrester	164	5.2	−15.5
TUSC	Tony Brown	150	4.8	+4.8
Majority		75	2.4	
Turnout		3,145	66.3	+19.1
Labour gain from Liberal Democrats		Swing		

St. Aidans
Party	Candidate	Votes	%	±%
Labour	Anne Quilter	1,194	44.4	+2.2
Conservative	Stewart Blake	794	29.5	+0.6
Green	John Reardon	550	20.5	+20.5
BNP	Tony Carvell	149	5.5	−9.3
Majority		400	14.9	+1.6
Turnout		2,687	58.2	+24.1
Labour hold		Swing		

Stanwix Rural
Party	Candidate	Votes	%	±%
Conservative	Marilyn Bowman	1,583	60.7	−17.0
Liberal Democrats	Peter Sanderson	550	21.1	+21.1
Labour	Niall Hendry	477	18.3	−4.0
Majority		1,033	39.6	−15.9
Turnout		2,610	71.6	+33.0
Conservative hold		Swing		

Stanwix Urban
Party	Candidate	Votes	%	±%
Conservative	Elizabeth Mallinson	1,935	53.5	−7.7
Labour	Paul Thurn	1,231	34.0	+7.7
Green	Dallas Brewis	452	12.5	+12.5
Majority		704	19.5	−15.4
Turnout		3,618	76.1	+35.0
Conservative hold		Swing		

Upperby
Party	Candidate	Votes	%	±%
Labour	David Wilson	1,176	50.9	
Conservative	Georgina Clarke	496	21.5	
Liberal Democrats	James Osler	475	20.6	
BNP	Ashleigh Tomlinson	163	7.1	
Majority		680	29.4	
Turnout		2,310	56.3	+20.2
Labour hold		Swing		

Wetheral
Party	Candidate	Votes	%	±%
Conservative	Neville Lishman	1,727	60.7	−17.8
Labour	Roger Horne	794	27.9	+6.4
UKIP	Geoff Round	326	11.5	+11.5
Majority		933	32.8	−24.1
Turnout		2,847	76.5	+32.7
Conservative hold		Swing		

Yewdale
Party	Candidate	Votes	%	±%
Labour	Steven Bowditch	1,653	49.3	+7.8
Conservative	Kate Rowley	1,353	40.3	−3.2
TUSC	Craig Johnston	176	5.2	+5.2
Green	Ian Brewis	173	5.2	+5.2
Majority		300	8.9	
Turnout		3,355	69.9	+25.5
Labour hold		Swing		

== By-elections between 2010 and 2011 ==
A by-election was held on 16 September 2010 for Stanwix Urban, after John Stevenson resigned from the council on being elected as a member of parliament. The seat was held for the Conservatives by Paul Nedved with a majority of 400 over Labour.

Stanwix Urban by-election 16 September 2010
Party	Candidate	Votes	%	±%
Conservative	Paul Nedved	888	57.0	+3.5
Labour	Jackie Franklin	488	31.3	−2.7
Green	Hazel Bowmaker	96	6.2	−6.3
English Democrat	Adam Pearson	85	5.5	+5.5
Majority		400	25.7	+6.2
Turnout		1,557	32.0	−44.1
Conservative hold		Swing		
