= Upperby =

Suburb of Carlisle, Cumbria, England

Coordinates: 54.872486°N 2.920476°W

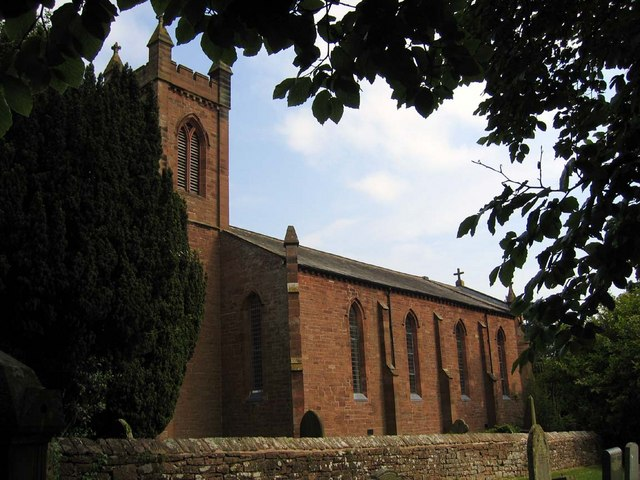
- Parish church of St John the Baptist

- Location within Cumbria
- Population: 5,476 (2011)
- Unitary authority: Cumberland
- Ceremonial county: Cumbria
- Region: North West
- Country: England
- Sovereign state: United Kingdom
- Police: Cumbria
- Fire: Cumbria
- Ambulance: North West

Upperby is a former village, now a suburb of Carlisle, in the Cumberland district, in the ceremonial county of Cumbria, England. The ward population taken at the 2011 census was 5,476. In 1870–72 the township/chapelry had a population of 595.

== Location ==
It is 1.4 miles (2.3 km) to the south-east of the city centre of Carlisle and is near the River Petteril. The original village extended along what is now St Ninian's Road from the Cross Keys Inn, on Upperby Road at the west end of the village, to an alabaster mill by the Petteril, (Note: The mill processed gypsum from Cotehill, 4 miles (6.4 km) to the south-east.) now an industrial site by the railway bridge. St John's Church, built 1840, is immediately north of the historic village.

== Features ==
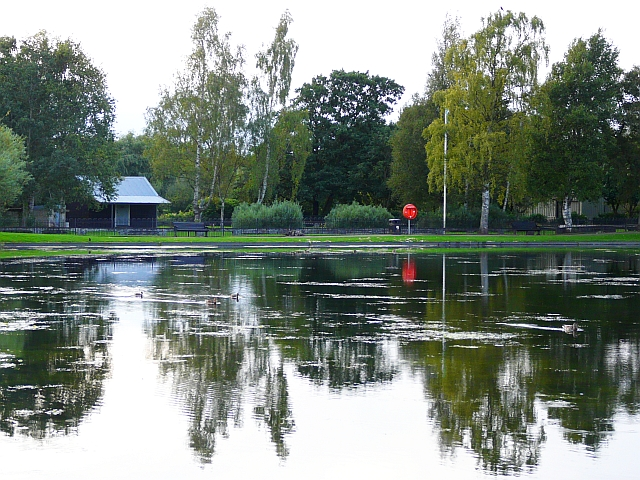
Hammond's Pond

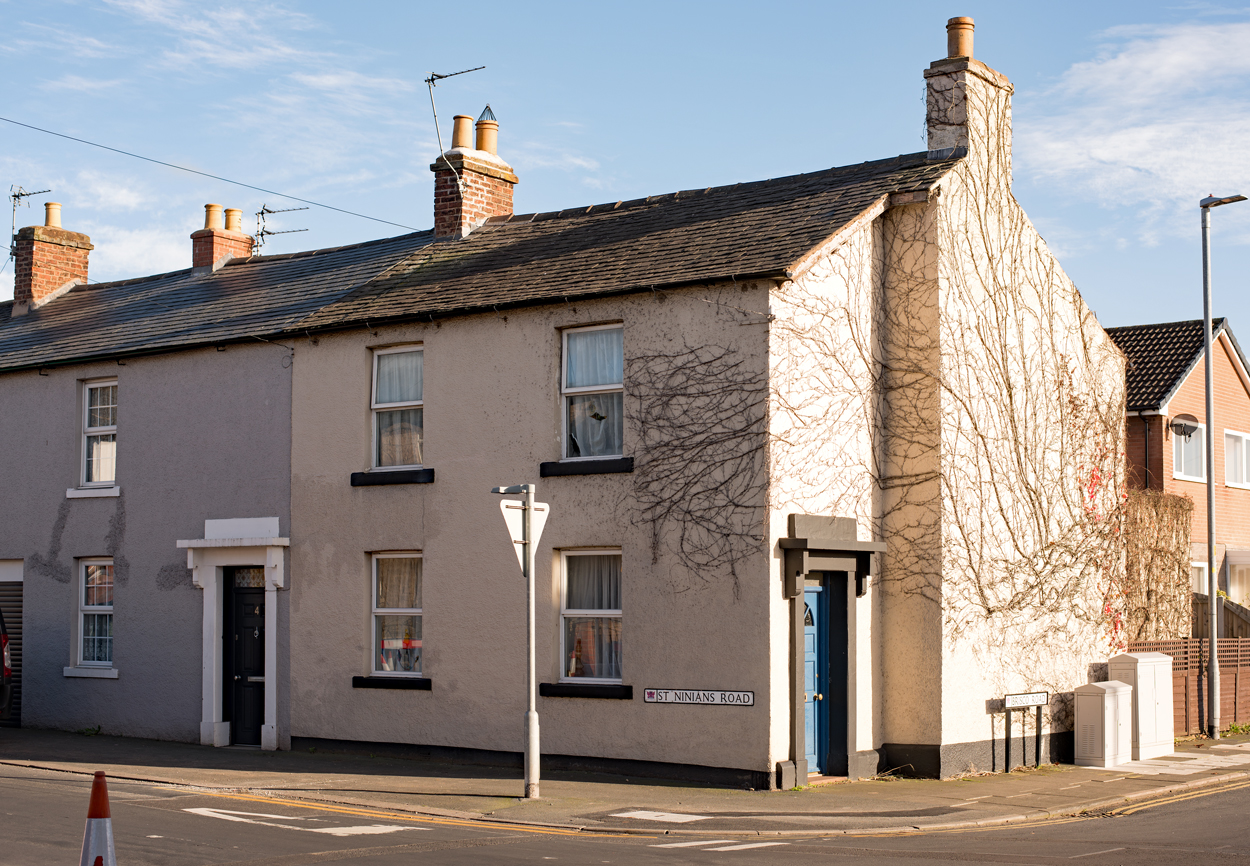
Former Black Bull Inn

Upperby has a park with a boating pool called Hammond's Pond which had originally been claypits known as "Clarty Dubs". What is now Scalegate Road was then known as "Black Lonning".

St. Ninian's Well, a wellhead by Sara Losh on the site of an ancient well, located in Brisco and not in St. Ninian's Road as might at first be supposed.

Upperby has a few schools:

- Upperby Primary School founded 1828, extended 1854, rebuilt 1912 and again more recently.
- Bishop Harvey Goodwin Primary School opened 1974 on the site of the Harold Street Girls School, as a successor to the Bishop Goodwin Memorial School.
- St. Margaret Mary's RC Primary School, Kirklands Road built 1938.
- Bishop Goodwin Memorial School opened 1893 on Blackwell Road, Upperby Parish being extended to include the new school which operated as a Church of England school. Demolished 1976.

Its pubs included:

- Black Bull Inn, on the junction between Upperby Road and St Ninian's Road, converted to a house.
- Cross Keys Inn, on Upperby Road at the west end of the village.
- Rose and Crown, north of the village on Upperby Road, demolished 2013.

== Nearby settlements ==
Nearby settlements include the city of Carlisle, the residential area (suburb of Carlisle) of Harraby, Currock and Blackwell.

== Origins ==
It may seem obvious that Upperby stands on a hill, but this is not in fact the origin of its name. If it were, the name would probably have been "Overby" (cf. "Netherby"). In 1163 Upperby was a "byr" or farm in the hands of a man called Hubrecht who paid tithes to the Prior of Carlisle and Hubricteby appears in the Charter dealing with the Property and Revenues of the Priory of Carlisle.

== Notable residents ==
Portrait miniature painter, Thomas Heathfield Carrick (4 July 1802 – 1874) was born here.

Artist, Thomas Bushby (1861 – 1918) came to Carlisle in 1844 to work for Hudson Scott and Sons (now the Metal Box Company) as a designer. He painted in watercolours and exhibited at the Royal Academy. His paintings of local cottages featured in a series of coloured postcards printed by Chas. Thurnam of Carlisle, and numerous scenes around Carlisle were published as postcards in the "Dainty" series by ETW Dennis, including a set of six Lake District views. Perhaps he did not actually live in Upperby, but so many of his paintings feature scenes from Upperby, Brisco, Blackwell or Cummersdale as to suggest that he must have known these localities very well.

Author and journalist, George MacDonald Fraser (2 April 1925 – 2 January 2008) was born and brought up in Currock, close enough to Upperby to be known locally as "Dr. Fraser's boy". He is best known for the Flashman series of novels, and Quartered Safe Out Here, an autobiography of his wartime experiences in Burma with the Border Regiment. After the war he was commissioned in the Gordon Highlanders and later was deputy editor of the Glasgow Herald.
