= Belah =

Suburb of Carlisle in Cumbria, England

Coordinates: 54.90°N 02.95°W

- Location in the former Carlisle district, Cumbria Location within Cumbria
- Population: 6,149 (2011.Ward)
- OS grid reference: NY3957
- Unitary authority: Cumberland
- Ceremonial county: Cumbria
- Region: North West
- Country: England
- Sovereign state: United Kingdom
- Police: Cumbria
- Fire: Cumbria
- Ambulance: North West

Belah is a suburb of Carlisle in the Cumberland district, in the county of Cumbria, England.
