= Belle Vue, Cumbria =

Suburb of Carlisle, Cumbria, England

Coordinates: 54.89393°N 2.97287°W

Belle Vue
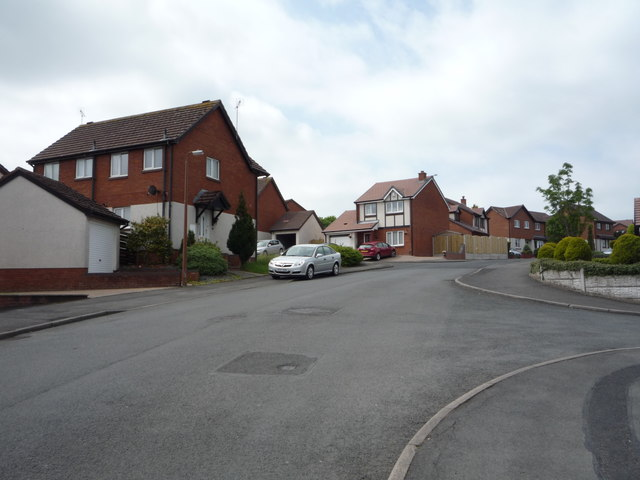
- Berkeley Grange

- Location within Cumbria
- Population: 6,491 (2011 census)
- Unitary authority: Cumberland
- Ceremonial county: Cumbria
- Region: North West
- Country: England
- Sovereign state: United Kingdom

Belle Vue is a suburb of Carlisle, in the Cumberland district, in the ceremonial county of Cumbria, England. The ward population taken at the 2011 census was 6,491.

The area is mostly residential and is situated on the western edge of the city's urban area and borders or is close to Newtown, Raffles, Sandsfield Park and Morton West.

It contains a school named Belle Vue Primary School. The area also has a pub (The Museum Inn), A local shop, a hair Salon and two play areas. It's also home to Burgh Road Industrial Estate. The B5307 runs through the area and connects with the A689. Bus route 67 serves the area and is operated by Stagecoach Cumbria & North Lancashire.

== Civil parish ==
The parish was formed on 31 December 1894 from the rural part of Caldewgate, on 9 November 1912 the parish was abolished and merged with Carlisle and Grinsdale. In 1911 the parish had a population of 339.
