= Tarraby =

Hamlet in Cumbria, England

Coordinates: 54.915°N 2.921°W

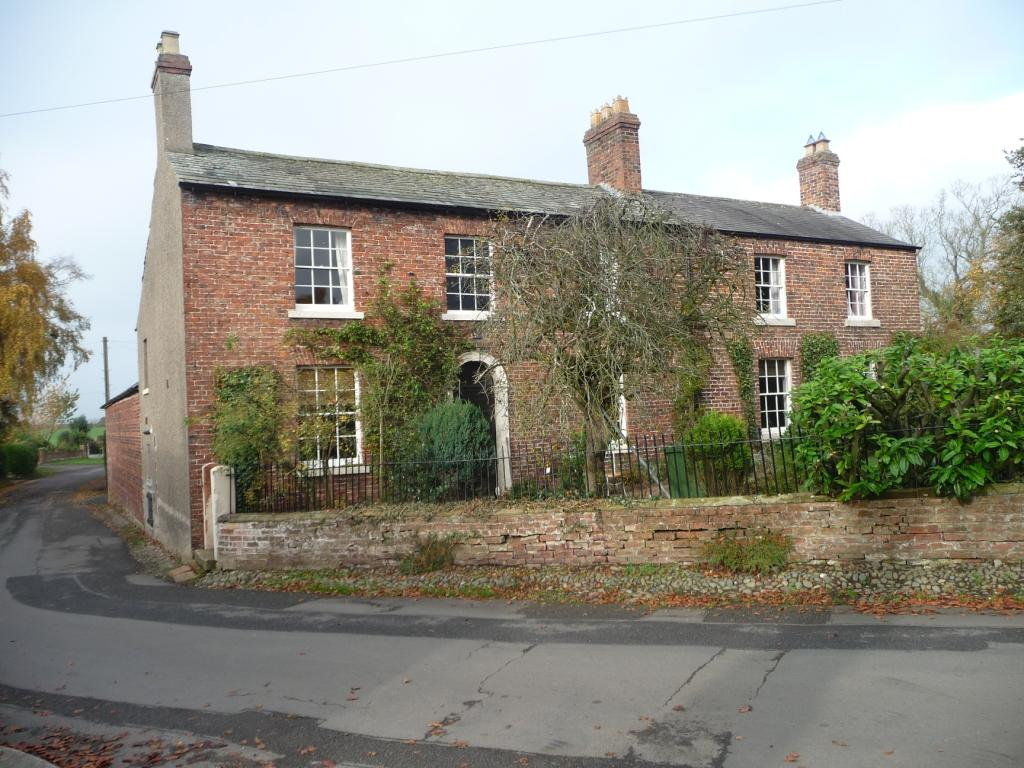
- Houses in Tarraby

- Location in the former Carlisle district Location within Cumbria
- OS grid reference: NY409582
- Civil parish: Stanwix Rural
- Unitary authority: Cumberland
- Ceremonial county: Cumbria
- Region: North West
- Country: England
- Sovereign state: United Kingdom
- Post town: CARLISLE
- Postcode district: CA3
- Dialling code: 01228
- Police: Cumbria
- Fire: Cumbria
- Ambulance: North West
- UK Parliament: Carlisle

Tarraby is a hamlet in the Cumberland district, in the county of Cumbria, England. Circa 1870, it had a population of 106 as recorded in the Imperial Gazetteer of England and Wales. Tarraby became a conservation area in 1969.

== Location ==
It is about two miles away from the city centre of Carlisle and is near the River Eden.

== Transport ==
For transport there is the B6264 about a quarter of a mile away, the A7 road, the A6 road, the A69 road, the A595 road, the A689 road and the M6 motorway nearby. There is also Carlisle railway station a few miles away, which is on the Settle-Carlisle Line.

== Nearby settlements ==
Nearby settlements include the city of Carlisle, the villages of Houghton, Rickerby, the hamlets of Whiteclosegate, Linstock, Brunstock and the residential areas (suburbs of Carlisle) of Knowefield, Stanwix, Edentown, Kingstown, Belah, Etterby and Moorville.

== See also ==
- Listed buildings in Stanwix Rural
