= Park Broom =

Hamlet in Cumbria, England

Coordinates: 54.921°N 2.886°W

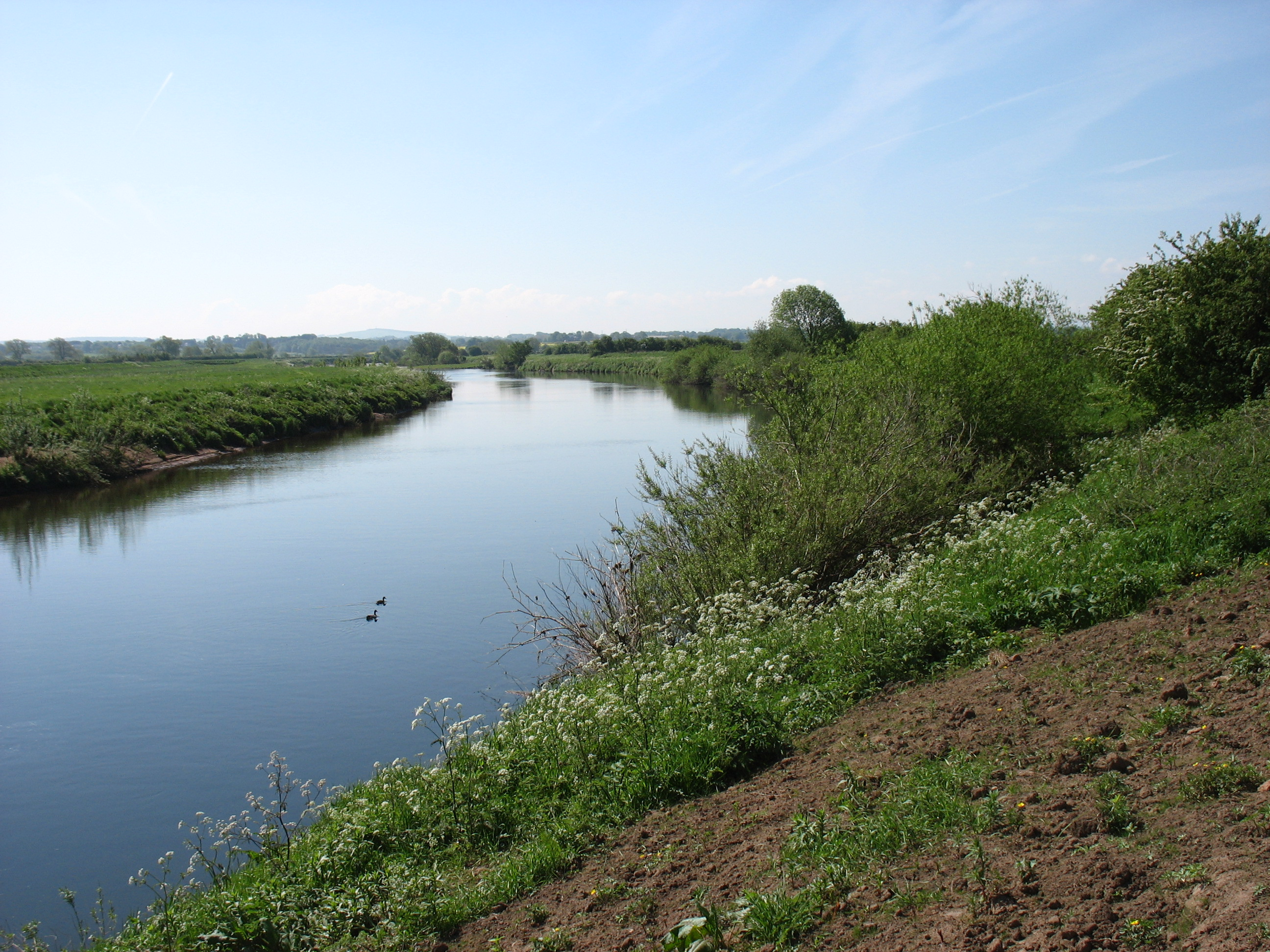
- The River Eden at Park Broom

- Location in the former Carlisle district, Cumbria Location within Cumbria
- OS grid reference: NY432588
- Civil parish: Stanwix Rural
- Unitary authority: Cumberland
- Ceremonial county: Cumbria
- Region: North West
- Country: England
- Sovereign state: United Kingdom
- Post town: CARLISLE
- Postcode district: CA6
- Dialling code: 01228
- Police: Cumbria
- Fire: Cumbria
- Ambulance: North West
- UK Parliament: Carlisle

Park Broom is a hamlet in the civil parish of Stanwix Rural, in the Cumberland district, in the county of Cumbria, England. It is a few miles away from the small city of Carlisle and near the River Eden. It was formerly in the township of Linstock.

== Nearby settlements ==
Nearby settlements include the commuter village of Houghton and the hamlets of Brunstock, Walby and Linstock.

== Transport ==
For transport there is the A689 about a quarter of a mile away, the B6264 about a mile away and the M6 motorway nearby. There is also Carlisle railway station a few miles away, which is on the Settle-Carlisle Line.
