= Brunstock =

Hamlet in Cumbria, England

Coordinates: 54.927°N 2.910°W

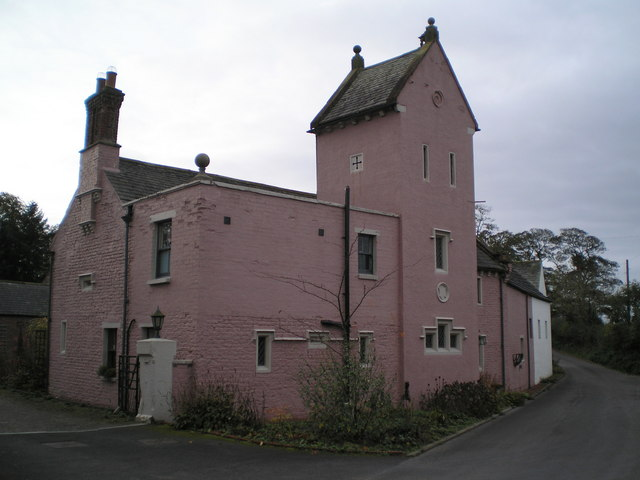
- The Old Dairy at Brunstock

- Location in the former Carlisle district Location within Cumbria
- OS grid reference: NY416595
- Civil parish: Stanwix Rural
- Unitary authority: Cumberland
- Ceremonial county: Cumbria
- Region: North West
- Country: England
- Sovereign state: United Kingdom
- Post town: CARLISLE
- Postcode district: CA6
- Dialling code: 01228
- Police: Cumbria
- Fire: Cumbria
- Ambulance: North West
- UK Parliament: Carlisle

Brunstock is a hamlet in the civil parish of Stanwix Rural, in the Cumberland district, in the ceremonial county of Cumbria, England. Circa 1870, the township had a population of 84 as recorded in the Imperial Gazetteer of England and Wales.

== History ==
The name "Brunstock" may mean 'Brun's farmstead", 'Brun's field-path', 'Brun's boundary-post', 'the farm by the burn', 'the field path by the burn' or 'the post by the burn'. Brunstock was "Brumescheyd" in 1124, "Brunescayd" in 1240, "Brunschaith" in 1250, "Bruneskayth" in 1253, "Brunscaith" in 1276, "Brunestach" in 1281, "Brunskeyt", "Brumskeyt" and "Brumschayt" in 1292, "Brunskayth" and "Brunschath" in 1318, "Brunskaith" in 1332, "Brunscayth" in 1345, "Burnscath" in 1422, "litillburnscath'" in 1424, "Bronnsketh" or "Bronsketh" in 1498, "Brunskath" in 1509, "Bronsketh mylne" in 1563, "Bronskewgh" in 1564, "Bruscath flu" in 1576, "Brunscathhead" in 1603, "Brunskathe Becke" and "Brunskaythe Beck" in 1609, "Brunskugh Beck" and "Brunskeugh Beck" in 1610, "Brunstock" in 1662, "Brunstock" or "Brunskeugh" in 1687, "Brim Stock" in 1710, "Brinstock" in 1714.

== Location ==
It is a few miles away from the small city of Carlisle and near the River Eden, there is also Brunstock Beck nearby.

== Nearby settlements ==
Nearby settlements include the city of Carlisle, the commuter village of Houghton, the hamlets of Linstock, Whiteclosegate, Tarraby and Park Broom.

== Transport ==
For transport there is the A689 road about an eighth of a mile away and the B6264 and M6 motorway nearby. There is also the Carlisle railway station a few miles away, which is on the Settle-Carlisle Line.

== See also ==
- Listed buildings in Stanwix Rural
