= Barclose =

Hamlet in Cumberland, England

Coordinates: 54.95°N 02.87°W

- Location in the former Carlisle district, Cumbria Location within Cumbria
- OS grid reference: NY4462
- Civil parish: Scaleby
- Unitary authority: Cumberland
- Ceremonial county: Cumbria
- Region: North West
- Country: England
- Sovereign state: United Kingdom
- Post town: CARLISLE
- Postcode district: CA6
- Dialling code: 01228
- Police: Cumbria
- Fire: Cumbria
- Ambulance: North West
- UK Parliament: Carlisle

Barclose is a hamlet in Cumbria, England. It is in the civil parish of Scaleby in the unitary authority area of Cumberland. It was in Carlisle district prior to 1 April 2023.

The placename "Barclose" existed in the parish at least as early as 1642.

A pub called "The Heilk Moon" at Barclose was part of the Carlisle State Management Scheme in 1920, and was open until at least 1984 (when the Heild Moon Leek Club, now based elsewhere, was founded).
