= Scaleby =

Village in Cumbria, England

Coordinates: 54.959°N 2.870°W

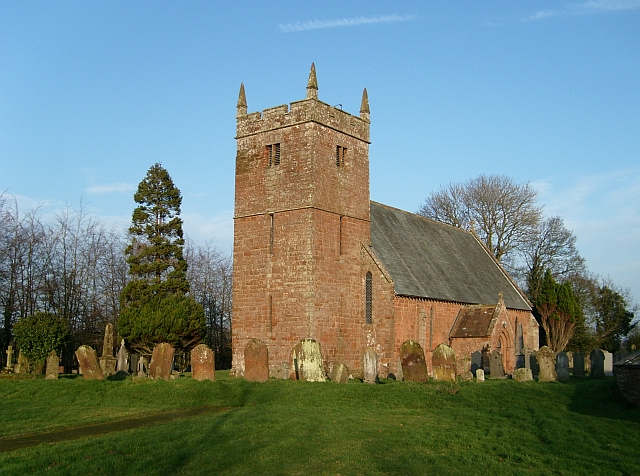
- Church of All Saints, Scaleby

- Location within Cumbria
- Population: 352 (2021)
- OS grid reference: NY4491463185
- Civil parish: Scaleby
- Unitary authority: Cumberland
- Ceremonial county: Cumbria
- Region: North West
- Country: England
- Sovereign state: United Kingdom
- Post town: Carlisle
- Postcode district: CA6
- Dialling code: 01228
- Police: Cumbria
- Fire: Cumbria
- Ambulance: North West
- UK Parliament: Carlisle

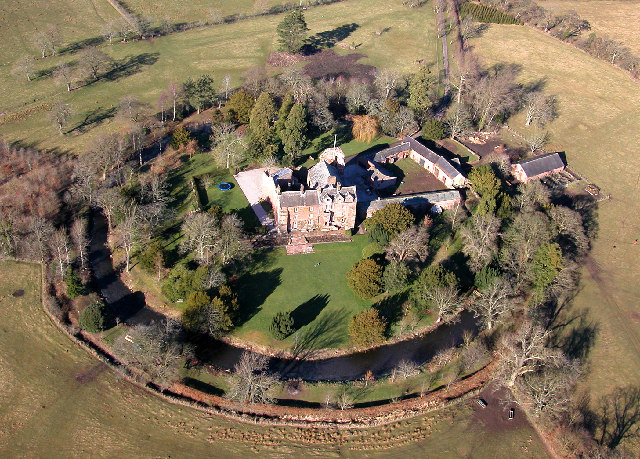
Scaleby Castle

Scaleby is a village and civil parish in the Cumberland district, in the ceremonial county of Cumbria, England. It is bounded on the north by Kirklinton and Irthington; whilst to the south lie Stanwix and Crosby-on-Eden. Scaleby is located six miles north-east of the city of Carlisle, and had a population of 352 in the 2021 census. Scaleby is located close to the M6 motorway making it relatively accessible to anyone interested in its two main attractions; Scaleby Castle and the Church of All Saints, the former having many links with notable names in history. The parish includes the hamlets of Barclose, Longpark and Scalebyhill. From 1974 to 2023 it was in Carlisle district.

The line of Hadrian's Wall passes a couple of miles south of Scaleby.

== Population ==
Scaleby has seen a significant decrease in population since the Industrial Revolution of the 18th and 19th Centuries. In the 1821 Census report, the population of Scaleby was 618 compared to 2001 when this figure was a significantly lower 349. As Britain moved away from its traditionally agricultural industry, Scaleby's population decreased simultaneously. The parish was always agriculturally based with peat once dug in the area; and without the demand for primary products, the village became unsustainable. In the 1831 Census report, the three dominant industries in Scaleby were; Retail and Handicrafts, Agricultural Labourers, and Non-Agricultural Labourers. It was due to this that Scaleby saw the level of migration it did. Workers were plying their trade elsewhere. More recently there has been far smaller variance in population. In the previous 20 years there had been an increase of 3% and even more recently; the previous 10 years there has been a decrease of roughly 1%. Scaleby also experienced a decline in housing between 1850 and 1930, decreasing from 122 to 87 showing again how this small villages economy struggled to get out of decline it found itself in. With the vast amounts of farmland available in the 3464 acres that spans Scaleby-East and Scaleby-West, agriculture remains the number one industry for this struggling parish.

== History ==
Scaleby differs from many other villages as a parish and thus a district. It is home to the Church of All Saints, an early 13th-century Church of England edifice with a 14th-century tower. It is a grade II listed English Heritage building with blocks of dressed red sandstone that are thought to be from the nearby Hadrian's Wall. Only 0.5 miles from the centre of Scaleby is Scaleby Castle, a grade I English Heritage building closed to the public.

It is unknown exactly when Scaleby Castle was built as it did not originate as a castle. The first recorded information about the castle is that it was granted to Richard de Talliol by Henry I at some point between 1100 and 1135. After many years of building and repairs it was declared a castle in 1367. The Castle continued to struggle with decay into the 1500s until Sir Richard Musgrave restored it. In 1645 the Castle was damaged by parliamentary troops. It remained ruinous from 1772 until the final restoration took place in the early 1800s. The Castle still stands today although there are still signs of what the building has been through with the three stories above the basement vault remaining ruined. This remains the main attraction to Scaleby, the moat flowing right around the Castle is another key feature contributing to the stunning appearance of the castle.

== Scaleby today ==
Today Scaleby is home to 349 people of which 183 are males and 166 are females. Of the 259 members of the population 192 are economically active. This shows that there is wealth within Scaleby. Looking further into this, the number of people employed in service industries is 130, whereas there are only 66 people working in 'extractive and manufacturing industries'. This shows that Scaleby is beginning to move away from its traditional agricultural society and people are working in Hotel and Catering, Real Estate, Health and Social work. There is also a greater distance travelled by the population of Scaleby; on average people are travelling 36.71 km to work every day.

== See also ==
- Listed buildings in Scaleby
