= Listed buildings in Stanwix Rural =

Stanwix Rural is a civil parish in the Cumberland district of Cumbria, England. It contains 63 listed buildings that are recorded in the National Heritage List for England. Of these, three are listed at Grade II*, the middle of the three grades, and the others are at Grade II, the lowest grade. The parish is to the northeast of the city of Carlisle, and contains the villages of Houghton, Low Crosby, High Crosby, Brunstock, Linstock, Tarraby, and Rickerby, and the surrounding countryside. The oldest two listed buildings originated as tower houses, and have since been extended and altered. Most of the listed buildings are country houses and smaller houses, some with associated structures, farmhouses and farm buildings. The other listed buildings include churches, milestones, a public house, schools, a war memorial, and an isolated tower.

== Key ==
Grade	Criteria
II*	Particularly important buildings of more than special interest
II	Buildings of national importance and special interest

== Buildings ==
Name and location	Photograph	Date	Notes	Grade
Linstock Castle; 54.91778°N 2.89259°W		Late 12th or early 13th century	A farmhouse that originated as a tower house, a hall was added in the 15th century, and the present windows were inserted in 1768. The tower is built with thick walls consisting of large blocks of sandstone, mostly from the nearby Roman Wall, and the tower is gabled and slated. It has one bay and three storeys. In the ground floor is a doorway with a chamfered round arch and a hood mould, and above it is another round-arched doorway, now blocked. The windows are sashes, and there are also blocked lancet windows. The hall is at right angles, in sandstone partly rendered, it has two storeys with a one-bay extension and a single-storey kitchen extension and two bays. Part of the moat still remains.	II*
Drawdykes Castle; 54.91822°N 2.90790°W	—	14th century (probable)	Originally a tower house, converted into a farmhouse in 1676, it is in sandstone, mainly from the Roman Wall, on a chamfered plinth, with quoins, a moulded cornice and parapet, and a slate roof. There are three storeys and three bays. The doorway has a moulded surround and a triangular pediment. The windows are sashes with moulded surrounds, those in the lower two floors having alternate segmental and triangular pediments. On the parapet is a coat of arms and a carved head, and in the rear wall is a built-in Roman altar and a re-used lintel.	II*
Stag Inn; 54.92728°N 2.86461°W		Late 17th century	A public house that was extended in the 20th century, it is built in sandstone, river cobbles, and some brick, and has a slate roof. The original part has two storeys and two bays, with a two-storey one-bay extension to the left. The doorway has a quoined surround. To the left of the doorway the windows have squared stone surrounds, and to the right they are chamfered.	II
Ivy Cottage; 54.90504°N 2.91472°W	—	1725	A brick cottage on a chamfered plinth, with stone dressings, quoins, a cornice, and a slate roof. There are two storeys and four bays. The doorway has a moulded surround, and the windows are casements.	II
Moor House; 54.90952°N 2.90951°W	—	Early 18th century	Originally a farmhouse, later a private house, it is in brick with stone dressings and a slate roof. There are two storeys and five bays. The doorway has a plain surround, and the windows, which are sashes, have brick segmental arches.	II
The Cottage and Way Side; 54.90385°N 2.91358°W	—	1732	Two cottages, originally three, one a schoolmaster's house, in brick on stone footings with slate roofs. They have two storeys, they are set at right angles, and each cottage has two bays with a one-bay extension to The Cottage. The windows are mullioned with chamfered surrounds, and contain casements. The Cottage has a dated lintel and dentilled eaves, and Way Side has a crow-stepped gable.	II
Eden School; 54.90455°N 2.91636°W	—	Early to mid 18th century	The original house was encased to become Rickerby House for George Head Head in about 1835, and it was extended in 1879. It is in calciferous sandstone with a string course, a moulded and dentilled cornice, and a hipped slate roof. There are two storeys and five bays. On the entrance front is a tetrastyle porch with Greek Doric columns, a moulded entablature, and a dentilled cornice. On the garden front are two wings of two bays each, and a hexastyle portico. The extension includes a three-storey tower, and a single-storey four-bay brick wing.	II
Fern Lea and Rondo Cottage; 54.91581°N 2.89744°W	—	1740	A pair of cottages, originally three estate cottages, in brick with a slate roof. They have 1 1/2 storeys, the right cottage has five bays, and the left has three, the left bay projecting and gabled. On the front are three gabled porches and five gabled dormers. All the windows have chamfered stone surrounds and contain 20th-century casements.	II
Eden Steads; 54.92677°N 2.86461°W	—	Mid 18th century	A farmhouse with a façade dating from the 19th century. It is rendered with stone dressings, corner pilaster strips, a moulded cornice, a parapet, and a slate roof with coped gables. There are two storeys and three bays, and a single-bay extension to the right. On the front are two Greek Ionic columns and a moulded and dentilled entablature, and above the door is a fanlight. The windows are sashes.	II
The Grange; 54.92753°N 2.91097°W	—	Mid 18th century	A stone house that has a slate roof with coped gables. There are two storeys and two bays. On the front is a 20th-century porch, and the windows are casements with plain surrounds.	II
High Crosby Farmhouse; 54.92952°N 2.85222°W	—	Mid 18th century	A farmhouse with a slate roof, in two storeys and three bays. The doorway has a moulded stone surround, an ornamental frieze, and a dentilled cornice. The windows have flat-headed brick arches with keystones. To the left is a single-storey one-bay extension, and to the right is a screen wall.	II
Garden wall, High Crosby Farmhouse; 54.92926°N 2.85221°W	—	18th century	The walls enclose the garden to the south of the farmhouse. They are in brick with stone coping. The walls contain a gateway that has two square columns with shaped and rounded heads, and wooden gates.	II
Mill House; 54.92040°N 2.90569°W	—	Mid 18th century (probable)	A house for the owner of a mill, later altered and extended, and used for other purposes. It is in brick with slate roofs, and has high chimney stacks. The original house and outbuildings form an F-shaped plan, they have two storeys, and a front of five bays. Some windows are mullioned, some are sashes, and others are casements. The original doorways have been blocked, and the present entrance on the north side dates from the 20th century. Behind the house are barns in a U-shape, surrounding a courtyard.	II
Oak House; 54.90349°N 2.91341°W	—	Mid 18th century	Originally a farmhouse, the house is in brick, with a roof of stone-slate at the front and slate at the rear. There are two storeys and six bays. The doorway has a moulded stone surround, and the sash windows have stone sills and segmental brick arches.	II
Oldgrove; 54.92291°N 2.89379°W	—	Mid 18th century	A stuccoed house with gutter modillions and a slate roof with coped gables. There are two storeys and five bays. The doorway and the windows, which are sashes, have chamfered surrounds, and in the ground floor they have hood moulds.	II
Old Vicarage; 54.92884°N 2.85180°W	—	Mid 18th century	The former vicarage is stuccoed with a slate roof. There are two storeys, three bays, and single-storey wings on each side. The doorway has a moulded surround, and the windows are sashes with stone sills.	II
South Garth; 54.92890°N 2.85091°W	—	Mid 18th century	A brick house on a stone plinth that has a slate roof with coped gables. There are two storeys with a cellar, and three bays. Steps lead up to the doorway that has a moulded surround and a plain fanlight. The windows are sashes with flat brick arches and keystones.	II
Town Head Farmhouse; 54.93079°N 2.92467°W	—	Mid 18th century	A brick farmhouse with a slate roof, in two storeys and five bays. There are two doorways, one with a fanlight, both with plain surrounds. The windows are sashes, with flat brick arches in the ground floor, and slightly rounded brick arches in the upper floor.	II
Milestone; 54.91686°N 2.91242°W	—	1758 (probable)	The milestone was provided for the Carlisle to Newcastle Military Road, later the Carlisle to Temon Turnpike. It is in sandstone, and consists of a chamfered stone, set to provide two faces. Each face contains a cast iron plate inscribed with the distances in miles to Carlisle and to Newcastle.	II
Milestone; 54.92370°N 2.89130°W	—	1758 (probable)	The milestone was provided for the Carlisle to Newcastle Military Road, later the Carlisle to Temon Turnpike. It is in sandstone, and consists of a chamfered stone, set to provide two faces. Each face contains a cast iron plate inscribed with the distances in miles to Carlisle and to Newcastle.	II
Milestone; 54.92710°N 2.86722°W	—	1758 (probable)	The milestone was provided for the Carlisle to Newcastle Military Road, later the Carlisle to Temon Turnpike. It is in sandstone, and consists of a chamfered stone, set to provide two faces. Each face contains a cast iron plate inscribed with the distances in miles to Carlisle and to Newcastle.	II
Milestone; 54.93063°N 2.84346°W	—	1758 (probable)	The milestone was provided for the Carlisle to Newcastle Military Road, later the Carlisle to Temon Turnpike. It is in sandstone, and consists of a chamfered stone, set to provide two faces. Each face contains a cast iron plate inscribed with the distances in miles to Carlisle and to Newcastle.	II
Tarraby House and barn 54.91466°N 2.92234°W	—	1772	The house and barn are in brick with slate roofs. The house has two storeys and three bays. The doorway has a moulded surround, an architrave, an inscribed and dated lintel, and a moulded cornice. The windows are sashes with flat brick arches and keystones. To the right, the barn has a large quoined cart entrance, windows and a loft.	II
The Beeches, Tarraby; 54.91401°N 2.92310°W	—	Late 18th century	A brick house with a moulded and dentilled cornice and a hipped slate roof. There are two storeys and six bays. The round-headed doorway has a patterned fanlight, and the sash windows have stone sills and lintels.	II
The Beeches, Rickerby; 54.90701°N 2.90694°W	—	Late 18th century	A brick house with a slate roof. There are two storeys and three bays, flanked by two-storey one-bay wings. The round-headed doorway has a fanlight, and the windows are cross-mullioned sashes.	II
The Croft and outbuildings 54.91462°N 2.89679°W	—	Late 18th century	The former farmhouse and adjoining outbuildings are in brick with slate roofs. The house has two storeys, four bays, two doorways with plain surrounds, and sash windows with stone sills. The outbuildings comprise stables, a barn, and a byre, that have plank doors, steps to a loft door, windows, and louvred vents.	II
Eden Cottage, Tower Cottage, Lawn Cottage, Barn View, and East View; 54.90382°N 2.91399°W	—	Late 18th century (probable)	A row of five cottages in brick with stone dressings, moulded modillions, and a slate roof with gables, some shaped, some crow-stepped, containing dormers. They have 1 1/2 storeys and two bays each. There are three porches, and the ground floor windows are mullioned with chamfered surrounds. To the northwest is a square brick two-storey tower with slits and a corbelled-out embattled parapet.	II
Eden Croft; 54.92651°N 2.86550°W	—	Late 18th century	A house that was extended in the early 19th century, it is in brick with stone dressings, a dentilled cornice with a blocking course, and a slate roof. There are two storeys and four bays, with a three-bay extension to the left. The round-headed doorway has two Ionic columns with a block entablature and an open dentilled pediment, and to the left is a projecting bay with a hipped roof. The extension has a projecting hexagonal bay. Most of the windows have moulded surrounds.	II
Barn, Eden Croft; 54.92647°N 2.86565°W	—	Late 18th century	The barn is in brick with sandstone dressings and a stone-slate roof. It has a rectangular plan and two storeys, and there is a 20th-century lean-to containing an entrance. The barn also contains a full-height opening and ventilation slits.	II
Near Boot Inn; 54.91327°N 2.91917°W		Late 18th century	Originally a house with stables, the public house was altered in 1929 by Harry Redfern. It is in brick with stone dressings and a slate roof. There are two storeys and five bays, the right two bays originally being the stables. Both of the doorways have quoins, a plain entablature, and a moulded cornice, and the windows are sashes with stone sills.	II
Roend; 54.92801°N 2.86414°W	—	Late 18th century	A brick house with quoins to the level of the string course, gutter modillions, and a slate roof. The doorway has a plain surround, and an entablature with a moulded cornice. The sash windows have plain surrounds.	II
Stable Block; 54.90449°N 2.91509°W	—	Late 18th century	Originally the stable block to Rickerby House, later used by a school, it is in brick with slate roofs. There are two storeys and five bays, with a three-bay wing at right angles. The doorway has a pointed arch, a chamfered and moulded surround, and a fanlight. The windows are mullioned with chamfered surrounds. At the northwest corner is a hexagonal clock tower with slit windows and an embattled parapet. On the north face are two hexagonal gate towers, and at the rear is another tower, with crow-stepped gables and a corbelled-out upper storey. Attached to the building is an embattled wall.	II
The Thorn; 54.91428°N 2.92330°W	—	Late 18th century	A former farmhouse, later a private house, in brick with a slate roof. There are two storeys and three bays, a two-storey two-bay extension at the right, and a two-storey extension with a stone-slate roof to the rear. The doorway has a plain surround, a moulded round arch, and a fanlight. The windows are sashes with flat brick arches.	II
Crosby Lodge; 54.92785°N 2.85272°W	—	1807–08	Originally a country house, and later a hotel, it was extended in the 1870s, and in the 20th century. The house is in brick with stone dressings and sandstone towers. The garden front has two storeys and three bays, and is flanked by three-storey single-bay towers, one octagonal and the other lager and square, and with later extensions. In the centre is a segmental two-storey bay window containing casement windows. The entrance front has a stepped brick porch with a moulded surround, squared pilasters, and an open parapet.	II
Houghton House; 54.93896°N 2.92659°W	—	c. 1810	A country house, stuccoed, with stone dressings, dentilled projecting eaves, and a hipped slate roof. There are two storeys and five bays, flanked by single-storey single-bay pedimented wings. On the front is a semicircular porch with pilaster strips, two Ionic columns, a moulded entablature and cornice, and a cast iron balcony. The porch is flanked by a cast iron verandah, at the ends of which are Ionic columns carrying urns. The ground floor windows are casements in moulded surrounds, and in the upper floor they are sashes with stuccoed surrounds.	II
The Knells; 54.93634°N 2.91631°W	—	1824	A country house that was remodelled in 1843–45, and later used for other purposes. It is in sandstone on a rusticated plinth, with a dentilled and moulded cornice, a parapet, and a hipped slate roof. There are two storeys, the entrance front has three bays, and the garden front has five. On the entrance front is a portico with two pairs of unfluted Ionic columns, and a moulded entablature and cornice. The doorway has a plain surround, and a moulded cornice on console brackets. The garden front has a recessed entrance bay, and pediments over the outer bays.	II
Knells Lodge; 54.93445°N 2.92016°W	—	1824	Originally the lodge to The Knells, later a private house, it is in calciferous sandstone, and has a hipped slate roof with a tile ridge. There is a single storey and three bays. On the front is a pedimented gabled porch with round-headed arches on the front and sides. The doorway and sash windows have plain surrounds.	II
Knells Lodge (South); 54.92799°N 2.90923°W	—	1824	The former lodge is in calciferous sandstone with a slate roof. It has a single storey and three bays. The central bay has a pedimented gable, and on the west side is a stone gabled porch carried on two square columns and with round arches. The windows are sashes with plain surrounds.	II
Gateway, Knells Lodge; 54.93441°N 2.92041°W	—	1824	The gate piers and walls are in calciferous sandstone. There are four square piers with recessed panels and pointed caps that are joined by semicircular walls with chamfered coping. On the gate piers are cast iron lamp brackets. The gates are in cast iron, and on the walls are wrought iron railings; the walls and railings extend in both directions for about 50 metres (160 ft) and end in hexagonal columns.	II
The Chestnuts; 54.92640°N 2.92456°W	—	Early 19th century	A brick house on a stone plinth with a slate roof, in two storeys and three bays. The round-headed doorway has a fluted surround, a false keystone, and a patterned fanlight. The sash windows have flat brick arches and stone sills.	II
Crosby House; 54.92897°N 2.85081°W	—	Early 19th century	A country house in brick on a stone plinth, with a string course, quoins, and a hipped slate roof. There are two storeys and five bays, flanked by two-storey single-bay wings. On the front is a portico in calciferous sandstone with four fluted Greek Doric columns, an entablature with triglyphs and metopes, and a door with a fanlight. The windows are sashes with moulded surrounds.	II
Gate piers, Crosby House; 54.92934°N 2.85144°W	—	Early 19th century	The gate piers are in red sandstone. They consist of rounded columns with oval panels, and are surmounted by carved vases.	II
Stables, Eden Steads; 54.92676°N 2.86538°W	—	Early 19th century	The stables are in brick with a slate roof; they are in a single storey with a two-storey entrance tower. The tower has a round archway with a shaped keystone, a string course, and a hipped roof with a shaped pinnacle. The stables have plank doors and ventilation holes.	II
Houghton Hall; 54.93025°N 2.92090°W	—	Early 19th century	A stuccoed house with stone dressings, eaves modillions, and a hipped slate roof. There are two storeys and five bays. The entrance has a portico with two squared and two cylindrical Greek Doric columns, triglyphs, and a moulded cornice. The doorway has a moulded surround and a fanlight, and the windows are sashes with moulded surrounds.	II
The Lodge; 54.92890°N 2.92432°W	—	Early 19th century	Originally a lodge to Brunstock House, later a private house, it is in brick with a hipped slate roof. There is a single storey with two bays, and a narrow round-headed entrance. The windows are sashes with round heads and stone sills.	II
Walby Farmhouse; 54.93277°N 2.88091°W	—	Early 19th century	A brick farmhouse with quoins, a dentilled gutter, and a slate roof. It has two storeys and three bays. The doorway has square pilasters, a plain entablature, a projecting cornice, and a fanlight. The windows, which are sashes, have moulded stone surrounds.	II
Brunstock House; 54.92598°N 2.90841°W	—	1827–32	A country house designed by Thomas Rickman, it is in calciferous sandstone and has a slate roof and gables with decorated bargeboards. The house has two storeys and three bays, with a single-storey five-bay wing to the right. On the front is a portico with three arches, buttresses, and pinnacles, and an embattled parapet. This flanked by canted bay windows with mullioned and transomed windows containing casements. Above the portico is a gabled dormer. The wing has cross-mullioned windows and an embattled parapet. At the rear is a stable block.	II*
East lodge, Brunstock House; 54.92724°N 2.90807°W	—	1827–32 (probable)	The lodge is in sandstone with a slate roof, and has a single storey and two bays. There is a projecting porch with decorative bargeboards, and a shaped and chamfered doorway with a hood mould. The windows are mullioned with pointed heads, chamfered surrounds and hood moulds, and they contain casements. At the rear is a gabled extension.	II
South lodge, Brunstock House; 54.92132°N 2.90211°W	—	1827–32	The former lodge was extended to the left in the late 19th century. It is in calciferous sandstone with a Welsh slate roof, in a single storey and four bays. On the front is a projecting gabled bay with decorative pinnacled bargeboards, an embattled canted bay window with a chamfered surround, and a wooden porch in the angle. The windows are casements.	II
West lodge, Brunstock House; 54.92473°N 2.90837°W	—	1827–32	The lodge is in calciferous sandstone with a slate roof. It has a single storey and two bays. There is a projecting gabled bay with a canted bay window containing casement windows with chamfered mullions, and decorated bargeboards with a finial. In the recessed bay is a porch.	II
Walls, gates and gate piers, Brunstock House; 54.92460°N 2.90817°W	—	1827–32	The piers and walls are in calciferous sandstone. The piers are round with moulded and embattled caps; two flank the gateway and two are at the ends of the walls. The walls are semicircular, on a plinth, and with chamfered (coping. The decorative gates are in wrought iron.	II
Brunstock Farmhouse and barns 54.92680°N 2.91104°W		Late 1820s	Originally the dairy to Brunstock House, it was extended in 1845. It is in brick with a stone-slate roof, and has two storeys and three bays. The doorway has a chamfered stone surround with a pointed arch and a hood mould. The ground floor windows are mullioned with casements with hood moulds, and in the upper floor are dormers in crow-stepped gables. At the rear is a 2 1/2-storey tower with a gabled roof. To the left and at right angles, are two-storey barns.	II
Barns and former cottage, Brunstock Farm; 54.92670°N 2.91062°W	—	After 1827	The former cottage and barns are in brick with slate roofs, and the cottage has coped gables. The cottage has a single storey and two bays, and contains mullioned widows with chamfered surrounds containing casements. The barns are on both sides, and contain plank doors and ventilation slits.	II
Old Schoolhouse; 54.90438°N 2.91359°W		1835	The former school was built at the expense of George Head Head. It is in calciferous sandstone on a chamfered plinth with a slate roof, and has a single storey and five bays. At the west end is a gabled porch with a chamfered doorway, above it is a hood mould and an inscribed panel, and it is flanked by lancet windows. On the gable is a corbelled bellcote with a finial. The other windows are cross-mullioned casements.	II
Study Quiet; 54.90552°N 2.91693°W		c. 1835	A north lodge to Rickerby House for George Head Head, it is in calciferous sandstone, with a single storey and two bays. The front is in the form of a tetrastyle Doric temple; it has an entablature with triglyphs, metopes, and guttae. In the tympanum of the pediment is a carved coat of arms and a motto. The doorway has pilaster strips, the windows are sashes with moulded surrounds, and at the rear are porticos.	II
Tower, Rickerby; 54.90632°N 2.91522°W		c. 1835	The tower, possibly originally a dovecote, was built for George Head Head. It is in mixed red and yellow sandstone, and has an octagonal plan and an octagonal pointed slate roof. There are two string courses, lancet windows with chamfered surrounds, and an entrance with a plain surround.	II
Brunstock Cottage; 54.92540°N 2.90965°W	—	1830s	Originally an estate house, it is in calciferous sandstone with a slate roof. There are two storeys and three bays. The doorway and sash windows have plain surrounds, and above the door is a fanlight.	II
Eden Grove; 54.92506°N 2.87719°W	—	1837–39	A country house in sandstone with a hipped slate roof. The main part has a single storey with a basement and three bays, and a four-bay service wing joined to the main part by a screen wall. On the front of the main part is a portico with two pairs of fluted Doric columns, and a moulded entablature and pediment. The doorway has tapering pilaster strips, side lights and a fanlight, and the windows, which are sashes, also with tapering pilasters. The wing has a hipped roof and sash windows, and the screen wall contains two round-headed entrances, one blocked, the other with a wrought iron gate.	II
St John's Church, Houghton; 54.92935°N 2.92495°W		1840–42	The church is built in sandstone from Dalston, and it has a slate roof. The interior was renovated in 1901 by C. J. Ferguson. The church consists of a nave with a short chancel and an east tower. The tower has three stages, angle buttresses, an entrance with a pointed arch and a hood mould, bell openings with Y-tracery, a corbelled and embattled parapet, and corner pinnacles. Above the entrance is a clock face. The nave windows are lancets.	II
Crosby-on-Eden School; 54.92795°N 2.86331°W	—	1844	The school is in sandstone with modillioned gutters and a hipped slate roof. It has a single storey and two bays. In the centre is a protruding gabled porch with a shaped entrance arch above which is an inscribed plaque and a clock. On the gable is a corbelled stone bellcote. The windows have chamfered surrounds, hood moulds, and casements with diamond-shaped tracery.	II
Latchend and cottage 54.92726°N 2.90917°W		1844	A pair of estate cottages in brick with sandstone dressings and a slate roof. They are in one storey, and each cottage has three bays. In the centre is a large projecting gable supported by slender columns, the ground floor containing double windows flanked by niches, and with an oriel window surmounted by a carved pigeon in the upper floor. Each cottage has a central gabled porch. The other bays are also gabled, the inner bays have triple mullioned windows, the outer bays with double cross-mullioned windows. All the gable contain highly decorative bargeboards.	II
St John's Church, Crosby; 54.92791°N 2.86277°W		1854	The church was designed by R. W. Billings and it replaced an earlier church on the site. It is in sandstone with a slate roof, and consists of a nave, a chancel with a north vestry, and a west steeple. The steeple has a tower with 2 1/2 stages, and contains a west doorway with a pointed arch, a crocketed open pediment, and a tympanum containing a trefoil. There are also a string course, lancet windows, and a projecting stair tower in the south wall. The spire has long crockets, tall lucarnes, canon gargoyles on the corners, and a pinnacle with a wheel-cross. The nave windows have pointed heads and contain Decorated tracery. Inside the church is the Norman font from the previous church.	II
Houghton war memorial 54.92928°N 2.92463°W		1922	The war memorial is in the churchyard of St John's Church, Houghton. It is in grey granite, and consists of a wheel-head cross with a short shaft on a two-tiered plinth and a two-stepped base. Carved on the cross is a sheathed sword in relief. On the plinth and the top step of the base are inscriptions and the names of those lost in the First World War.	II
