= Linstock, Cumbria =

Village in England

Coordinates: 54.917°N 2.894°W

Linstock
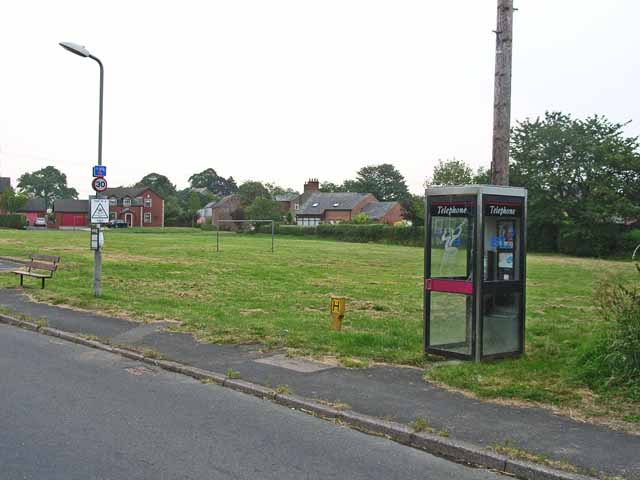
- Linstock village green

- Location in the former Carlisle district, Cumbria Location within Cumbria
- OS grid reference: NY427584
- Civil parish: Stanwix Rural
- Unitary authority: Cumberland
- Ceremonial county: Cumbria
- Region: North West
- Country: England
- Sovereign state: United Kingdom
- Post town: CARLISLE
- Postcode district: CA6
- Dialling code: 01228
- Police: Cumbria
- Fire: Cumbria
- Ambulance: North West
- UK Parliament: Carlisle

Linstock is a village in the civil parish of Stanwix Rural, in the Cumberland district, in the county of Cumbria, England. It is a few miles away from the city of Carlisle and near the River Eden. Circa 1870, it had a population of 205 as recorded in the Imperial Gazetteer of England and Wales.

== Nearby settlements ==
Nearby settlements include the commuter village of Houghton and the hamlets of Brunstock, Walby, Park Broom and Whiteclosegate.

== Transport ==
For transport there is the B6264 road, the A689 road and the M6 motorway nearby, there is a bridge going over the M6 motorway called Linstock Bridge. There is also the Carlisle railway station a few miles away, which is on the Settle-Carlisle Line.

== Landmarks ==
Linstock Castle, now a farmhouse, was formerly a tower house built in the 12th or early 13th century as a palace for the Bishops of Carlisle, with 17th-20th century additions and alterations.

Half a mile to the west, beside the M6, Drawdykes Castle is a former pele tower, converted to a house with a Classical Revival facade in 1676.

== See also ==
- Listed buildings in Stanwix Rural
