= Whiteclosegate =

Hamlet in Cumbria, England

Coordinates: 54.911°N 2.919°W

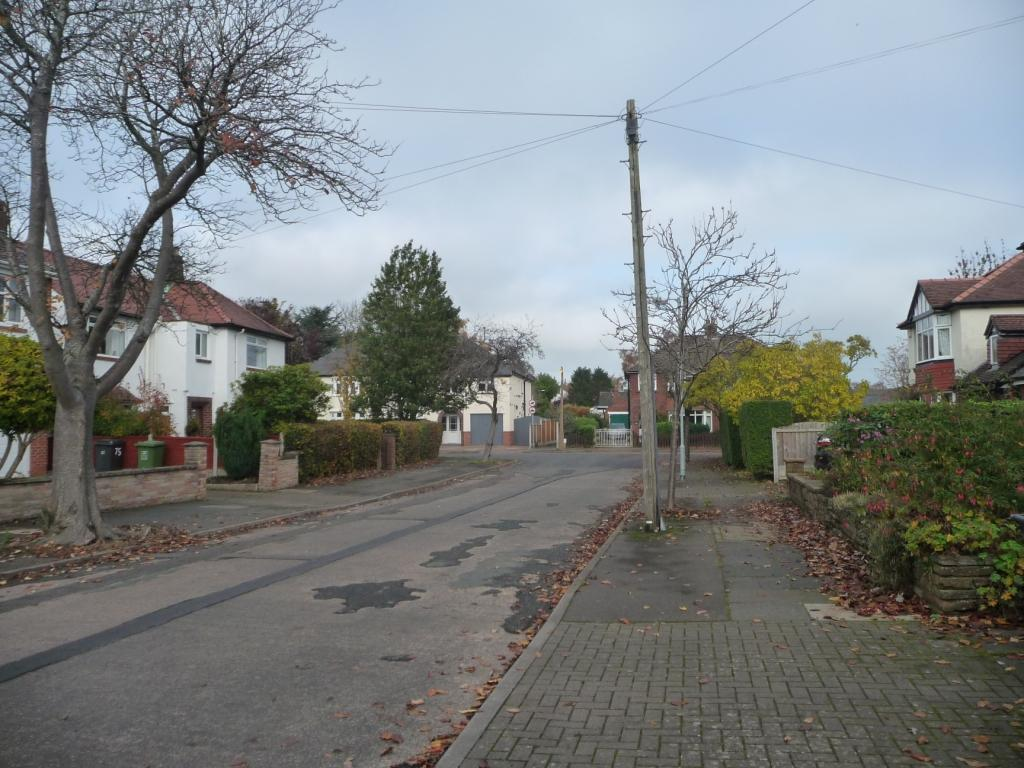
- Croft Road, Whiteclosegate

- Location in the former Carlisle district Location within Cumbria
- OS grid reference: NY410577
- Civil parish: Stanwix Rural
- Unitary authority: Cumberland
- Ceremonial county: Cumbria
- Region: North West
- Country: England
- Sovereign state: United Kingdom
- Post town: CARLISLE
- Postcode district: CA3
- Dialling code: 01228
- Police: Cumbria
- Fire: Cumbria
- Ambulance: North West
- UK Parliament: Carlisle

Whiteclosegate is a hamlet in the Cumberland district of the county of Cumbria, England.

== Location ==
It is on the B6264 road. Nearby settlements include the city of Carlisle, the villages of Houghton and Rickerby, the hamlets of Linstock and Tarraby and the residential areas of Kingstown and Moorville.

== Transport ==
For transport, in addition to the B6264, the A689 road, A595 road, A69 road and A6 road and the M6 motorway are nearby. There is also Carlisle railway station about a mile and a half away.
