= Walby =

Hamlet in Cumbria, England

Coordinates: 54.935°N 2.879°W

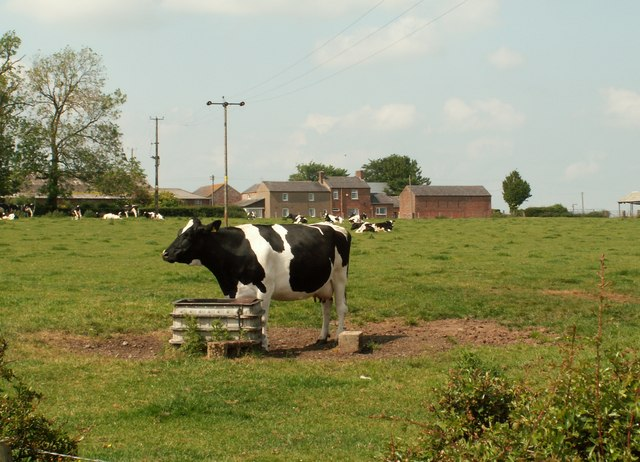
- Walby

- Location in the former Carlisle district, Cumbria Location within Cumbria
- OS grid reference: NY436603
- Civil parish: Stanwix Rural
- Unitary authority: Cumberland
- Ceremonial county: Cumbria
- Region: North West
- Country: England
- Sovereign state: United Kingdom
- Post town: CARLISLE
- Postcode district: CA6
- Dialling code: 01228
- Police: Cumbria
- Fire: Cumbria
- Ambulance: North West
- UK Parliament: Carlisle

Walby is a hamlet in the civil parish of Stanwix Rural, in the Cumberland district, in the county of Cumbria, England. It is a few miles away from the city of Carlisle and near the hamlet of Linstock. It is on Willow Beck near the River Eden and is about half a mile away from the main A689 road. It has an open farm. Circa 1870, it had a population of 40 as recorded in the Imperial Gazetteer of England and Wales. The surname derives from the place.
