= Rickerby Park =

Park in Rickerby, Cumbria, England

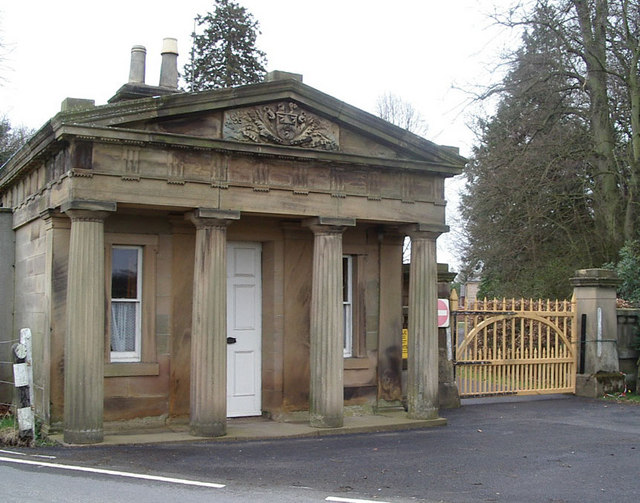
- Interactive map of Rickerby Park
- Type: Public park
- Location: Carlisle, Cumbria, England
- Coordinates: 54°54′14″N 2°55′34″W
- Opened: 1922
- Designation: Grade II registered park and garden

Rickerby Park is a public open space in Carlisle, Cumbria, England, on the banks of the River Eden. The parkland is dotted with mature trees, beneath which cattle and sheep graze the sweet pasture grasses. A riverbank path follows the sweeping bends of the Eden and, by crossing the Memorial Bridge, you can complete a circular walk back to the city centre on the opposite bank. Nearby is Rickerby Hall and the village of Rickerby.

The park is listed Grade II in Historic England's Register of Parks and Gardens.

== History ==
The manor of Rickerby has been owned by a number of families, specifically the Tilliols, Rickerbys, Pickerings, Westons, Musgraves, Studholmes, Gilpins, Richardsons, and Grahams.

In the 19th century it was owned by the banker George Head Head. In 1876, George Head Head died and Miles MacInnes, a justice of the Peace, succeeded to the 940 acres (3.8 km^{2}) of Rickerby where he owned all the land. In 1914 the estate was broken up and sold off up by the trustees of the MacInnes estate.

In 1920 the Citizens League purchased the area known today as Rickerby Park for £11,500. In a joint scheme with the corporation (now Carlisle City Council), Rickerby Park was dedicated as a memorial to the fallen of the Great War of 1914-1918. The Memorial Bridge, incorrectly known as the suspension bridge locally, from St Aidans Road was erected along with the Memorial Cenotaph. On 25 May 1922, Rickerby Park was formally opened and handed over to the City of Carlisle for the benefit of the public.
