= Listed buildings in Cummersdale =

Cummersdale is a civil parish in the Cumberland district of Cumbria, England. It contains six listed buildings that are recorded in the National Heritage List for England. All the listed buildings are designated at Grade II, the lowest of the three grades, which is applied to "buildings of national importance and special interest". The parish contains the village of Cummersdale, and is otherwise rural. The listed buildings consist of houses, a farmhouse and barn, a public house, and a milestone.

== Buildings ==
Name and location	Photograph	Date	Notes
Milestone; 54.86818°N 2.98869°W	—	Late 18th or early 19th century	The milestone was provided for the Carlisle to Cockermouth turnpike. It is in sandstone and has a round top and a curved face. On the face is a cast iron plate showing the distances in miles to Carlisle, Wigton, and Cockermouth.
Caldew Bank; 54.86952°N 2.94847°W	—	Early 19th century	A brick house on a sandstone plinth, with modillions to the gutter and a slate roof. There are two storeys with a cellar, and three bays. On the front is a recessed round-headed doorway with a fanlight. The windows are sashes with slightly round brick heads and stone sills.
Maxwell Cottage; 54.87593°N 2.98642°W	—	Early 19th century	The cottage is in red and yellow sandstone with a slate roof. There are two storeys, three bays, and a lean-to at the right. In the centre is a 20th-century pebbledashed porch with wooden upper parts. The doorway and the sash windows have plain surrounds.
Newby West Farmhouse and barn 54.87550°N 2.98652°W	—	Early 19th century	The farmhouse and attached barn are in brick on a plinth and have slate roofs. The farmhouse has two storeys and three bays. The doorway has a squared pilastered surround, an entablature, a moulded cornice, and a fanlight, and the windows are sashes. The barn is rendered and has corner quoins, a quoined arch, small windows and ventilation slits.
Cummersdale House; 54.86975°N 2.95239°W	—	1830s	A brick house with light headers on a stone plinth, with stone dressings, stone modillions and a cast iron gutter, and a slate roof. There are two storeys and three bays. The doorway has a plain surround, a fanlight, and a moulded cornice, and the sash windows have moulded surrounds.
Spinners Arms; 54.87049°N 2.95310°W		1929–30	The public house was designed by Harry Redfern in Vernacular Revival style. It is in brick with some applied timber-framing and has a tiled roof. There are two storeys and three bays. The right bay projects forward, it is gabled, partly weatherboarded, and contains an oriel window. In the middle bay is a recessed round-headed doorway, and the windows are casements in timber frames. In the roof there are a two dormers, one is gabled and the other is hipped.
