= Etterby =

Suburb of Carlisle, Cumbria, England

Coordinates: 54.907°N 2.955°W

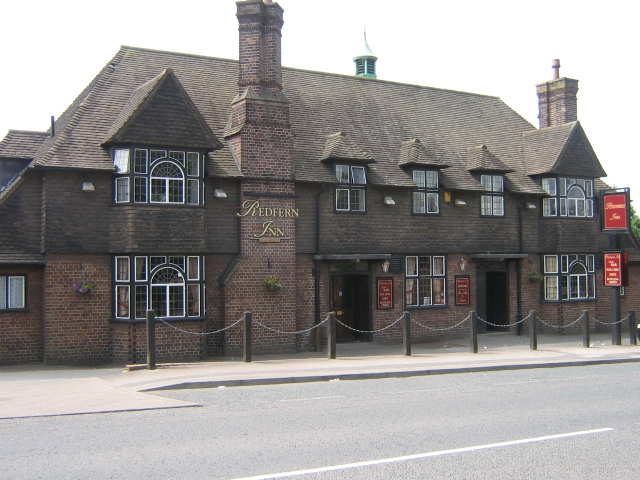
- Redfern Inn, Etterby

- Location in the former Carlisle district, Cumbria Location within Cumbria
- Unitary authority: Cumberland
- Ceremonial county: Cumbria
- Region: North West
- Country: England
- Sovereign state: United Kingdom
- Postcode district: CA
- Police: Cumbria
- Fire: Cumbria
- Ambulance: North West

Etterby is a former village in Cumbria, England. It is now a northwestern suburb of Carlisle, on the northern side of the River Eden. The Redfern Inn (1939–1940) was designed by the architect Harry Redfern in the New Model Inn style. In 1870-72 the township had a population of 319.
