= Crosby-on-Eden =

Village in Cumbria, England

Coordinates: 54.932°N 2.844°W

- Location in the former Carlisle district, Cumbria Location within Cumbria
- OS grid reference: NY459600
- Civil parish: Stanwix Rural
- Unitary authority: Cumberland
- Ceremonial county: Cumbria
- Region: North West
- Country: England
- Sovereign state: United Kingdom
- Post town: CARLISLE
- Postcode district: CA6
- Dialling code: 01228
- Police: Cumbria
- Fire: Cumbria
- Ambulance: North West
- UK Parliament: Carlisle

Crosby-on-Eden is the combined name for two small villages, High Crosby and Low Crosby, within the civil parish of Stanwix Rural near Carlisle, in the Cumberland district, in the ceremonial county of Cumbria, England. It was formerly a parish in its own right under the name Crosby upon Eden. In 1931, the parish had a population of 238. On 1 April 1934, the parish was abolished and merged with Stanwix Rural, and part also went to Wetheral.

The villages are by the River Eden north-east of Carlisle, joined by a road that used to be the line of the Stanegate Roman road. It has been thought on spacing grounds that there might have been a small Roman fort in Crosby-on-Eden, as part of the so-called Stanegate frontier which preceded Hadrian's Wall, but if such a fort exists it has not yet been found. The Stanegate ran in a deep cutting still visible next to the road running west from High Crosby, and it has been suggested that part of the reason for the cutting was to produce stone for building work.

The line of Hadrian's Wall passes a mile or so to the north, and the Hadrian's Wall Path follows the Stanegate through the villages.

In Low Crosby is the Church of St John the Evangelist, a rebuilt church by R.H. Billings in the Gothic style. A grange was built here and named Crosby. High Crosby is a half mile east of Low Crosby, and located in the village is Crosby House, a former mansion that is now a hotel.

The villages are bypassed by the A689 road which used to be numbered as part of the B6264 and follows the route of General Wade's Military Road.

Crosby-on-Eden has a primary school, Crosby-on-Eden C. of E. School, built in 1844.

== RAF Crosby-on-Eden ==
RAF Crosby-on-Eden was a Second World War airfield which was home to No.59 Operational Training Unit providing day training for Hawker Hurricane pilots. It was replaced by No. 9 Operational Training Unit, 17 Group Coastal Command, in August 1942 for training long-range fighter crews on Bristol Beaufort and Bristol Beaufighter conversion squadrons, as well as air firing and night flying. In August 1944, the station came under the command of No. 109 Operational Training Unit, a transport command of Douglas Dakotas. The station was renamed 1383 TCU on 1 August 1945.

After the Second World War, British European Airways commenced flights to Ronaldsway and Belfast. However, the RAF station had no post-war use or need and was closed in 1947. It was reopened in 1960 as Carlisle Airport. Since 2006, the airport has been known as Carlisle Lake District Airport, and since 30 May 2009, the airport lease has been owned by the Stobart Group.

== See also ==
- Listed buildings in Stanwix Rural
