= 2003 Carlisle City Council election =

2003 UK local government election

Map of the results of the 2003 Carlisle City Council election. Conservatives in blue, Labour in red and Liberal Democrats in yellow. Wards in grey were not contested in 2003.

The 2003 Carlisle City Council election took place on 1 May 2003 to elect members of Carlisle District Council in Cumbria, England. One third of the council was up for election and the Conservative Party lost overall control of the council to no overall control.

After the election, the composition of the council was:

- Conservative 24
- Labour 22
- Liberal Democrats 5
- Independent 1

== Election result ==
Overall turnout at the election was 31.4%, slightly down from the 31.7% in 2002.

Carlisle local election result 2003
| Party | Seats | Gains | Losses | Net gain/loss | Seats % | Votes % | Votes | +/− |
|---|---|---|---|---|---|---|---|---|
| Conservative | 9 | 0 | 3 | -3 | 47.4 | 41.1 | 9,317 | -1.8% |
| Labour | 8 | 4 | 0 | +4 | 42.1 | 44.1 | 10,016 | +0.2% |
| Liberal Democrats | 2 | 0 | 0 | 0 | 10.5 | 14.6 | 3,304 | +3.6% |
| Independent | 0 | 0 | 1 | -1 | 0 | 0.3 | 59 | -1.8% |

== Ward results ==
Belah
| Party | Candidate | Votes | % | ±% |
|---|---|---|---|---|
| Conservative | Alan Toole | 948 | 59.3 | −1.0 |
| Labour | Mohammed Harid | 650 | 40.7 | +1.0 |
| Majority | | 298 | 18.6 | −1.9 |
| Turnout | | 1,598 | 34.3 | |
| Conservative hold | | Swing | | |

Belle Vue
| Party | Candidate | Votes | % | ±% |
|---|---|---|---|---|
| Labour | Mary Styth | 570 | 47.2 | −1.2 |
| Conservative | Neville Lishman | 425 | 35.2 | −2.7 |
| Liberal Democrats | James Tootle | 153 | 12.7 | +1.2 |
| Independent | Steven Cochrane | 59 | 4.9 | +4.9 |
| Majority | | 145 | 12.0 | +1.6 |
| Turnout | | 1,207 | 29.2 | |
| Labour hold | | Swing | | |

Botcherby
| Party | Candidate | Votes | % | ±% |
|---|---|---|---|---|
| Labour | Charles Scarborough | 698 | 60.7 | −2.4 |
| Conservative | Gareth Ellis | 452 | 39.3 | +2.4 |
| Majority | | 246 | 21.4 | −4.8 |
| Turnout | | 1,150 | 26.0 | |
| Labour gain from Conservative | | Swing | | |

Burgh
| Party | Candidate | Votes | % | ±% |
|---|---|---|---|---|
| Conservative | John Collier | 391 | 72.5 | |
| Labour | Robin Pearson | 148 | 27.5 | |
| Majority | | 243 | 45.1 | |
| Turnout | | 539 | 34.0 | |
| Conservative hold | | Swing | | |

Castle
| Party | Candidate | Votes | % | ±% |
|---|---|---|---|---|
| Liberal Democrats | Thomas Hodgson | 603 | 57.6 | +8.5 |
| Labour | Raymond Warwick | 443 | 42.4 | +9.0 |
| Majority | | 160 | 15.3 | −0.5 |
| Turnout | | 1,046 | 24.7 | |
| Liberal Democrats hold | | Swing | | |

Currock
| Party | Candidate | Votes | % | ±% |
|---|---|---|---|---|
| Labour | Richard Im Thurn | 719 | 72.6 | −5.1 |
| Conservative | David Blackadder | 272 | 27.4 | +5.1 |
| Majority | | 447 | 45.1 | −10.2 |
| Turnout | | 991 | 23.1 | |
| Labour gain from Independent | | Swing | | |

Dalston
| Party | Candidate | Votes | % | ±% |
|---|---|---|---|---|
| Conservative | Brian Dodd | 780 | 45.5 | −2.9 |
| Liberal Democrats | Trevor Allison | 654 | 38.1 | +4.2 |
| Labour | Ann Warwick | 281 | 16.4 | −1.3 |
| Majority | | 126 | 7.3 | −7.2 |
| Turnout | | 1,715 | 40.4 | |
| Conservative hold | | Swing | | |

Denton Holme
| Party | Candidate | Votes | % | ±% |
|---|---|---|---|---|
| Labour | Hugh McDevitt | 834 | 70.9 | +3.4 |
| Conservative | Stephen Metcalfe | 232 | 19.7 | +2.1 |
| Liberal Democrats | Olwyn Luckley | 111 | 9.4 | −5.5 |
| Majority | | 602 | 51.1 | +1.2 |
| Turnout | | 1,177 | 26.9 | |
| Labour hold | | Swing | | |

Harraby
| Party | Candidate | Votes | % | ±% |
|---|---|---|---|---|
| Labour | Cyril Weber | 851 | 67.3 | +5.2 |
| Conservative | Michele Gwillim | 311 | 24.6 | −13.3 |
| Liberal Democrats | Eileen Aldersey | 102 | 8.1 | +8.1 |
| Majority | | 540 | 42.7 | +18.4 |
| Turnout | | 1,264 | 28.3 | |
| Labour hold | | Swing | | |

Irthing
| Party | Candidate | Votes | % | ±% |
|---|---|---|---|---|
| Conservative | James Knapton | 419 | 76.5 | |
| Labour | Alex Faulds | 129 | 23.5 | |
| Majority | | 290 | 52.9 | |
| Turnout | | 548 | 33.7 | |
| Conservative hold | | Swing | | |

Longtown and Rockliffe
| Party | Candidate | Votes | % | ±% |
|---|---|---|---|---|
| Conservative | John Jefferson | 568 | 62.2 | +3.0 |
| Labour | Robert Dodds | 345 | 37.8 | −3.0 |
| Majority | | 223 | 24.4 | +6.0 |
| Turnout | | 913 | 29.0 | |
| Conservative hold | | Swing | | |

Lyne
| Party | Candidate | Votes | % | ±% |
|---|---|---|---|---|
| Conservative | Cyril Bowman | 421 | 82.7 | |
| Labour | Roger Horne | 88 | 17.3 | |
| Majority | | 333 | 65.4 | |
| Turnout | | 509 | 32.8 | |
| Conservative hold | | Swing | | |

Morton
| Party | Candidate | Votes | % | ±% |
|---|---|---|---|---|
| Liberal Democrats | Ralph Aldersey | 947 | 50.3 | −0.7 |
| Labour | John Bell | 935 | 49.7 | +10.9 |
| Majority | | 12 | 0.6 | −11.5 |
| Turnout | | 1,882 | 39.7 | |
| Liberal Democrats hold | | Swing | | |

St. Aidans
| Party | Candidate | Votes | % | ±% |
|---|---|---|---|---|
| Labour | Reginald Watson | 691 | 49.0 | −10.8 |
| Conservative | Lawrence Fisher | 551 | 39.1 | −1.1 |
| Liberal Democrats | Steven Tweedie | 167 | 11.9 | +11.9 |
| Majority | | 140 | 9.9 | −9.6 |
| Turnout | | 1,409 | 30.8 | |
| Labour gain from Conservative | | Swing | | |

Stanwix Rural
| Party | Candidate | Votes | % | ±% |
|---|---|---|---|---|
| Conservative | Edward Firth | 737 | 74.3 | −3.3 |
| Labour | John Hale | 255 | 25.7 | +3.3 |
| Majority | | 482 | 48.6 | −6.6 |
| Turnout | | 992 | 30.2 | |
| Conservative hold | | Swing | | |

Stanwix Urban
| Party | Candidate | Votes | % | ±% |
|---|---|---|---|---|
| Conservative | Jacquelyne Geddes | 930 | 56.6 | −9.2 |
| Labour | Keith Aitken | 479 | 29.2 | −5.0 |
| Liberal Democrats | Roger O'Brienn | 234 | 14.2 | +14.2 |
| Majority | | 451 | 27.4 | −4.2 |
| Turnout | | 1,643 | 35.3 | |
| Conservative hold | | Swing | | |

Upperby
| Party | Candidate | Votes | % | ±% |
|---|---|---|---|---|
| Labour | Margaret Martlew | 774 | 63.8 | −5.4 |
| Conservative | Richard Hyslop | 273 | 22.5 | −8.3 |
| Liberal Democrats | James Osler | 167 | 13.8 | +13.8 |
| Majority | | 501 | 41.3 | +2.9 |
| Turnout | | 1,214 | 30.2 | |
| Labour hold | | Swing | | |

Wetheral
| Party | Candidate | Votes | % | ±% |
|---|---|---|---|---|
| Conservative | Barry Earp | 983 | 76.9 | +15.3 |
| Labour | Helen Horne | 295 | 23.1 | +23.1 |
| Majority | | 688 | 53.8 | +30.6 |
| Turnout | | 1,278 | 37.4 | |
| Conservative hold | | Swing | | |

Yewdale
| Party | Candidate | Votes | % | ±% |
|---|---|---|---|---|
| Labour | Joseph Hendry | 831 | 51.3 | +5.6 |
| Conservative | Bryan Hodgson | 624 | 38.5 | −5.9 |
| Liberal Democrats | Hannah Farmer | 166 | 10.2 | +0.4 |
| Majority | | 207 | 12.8 | +11.5 |
| Turnout | | 1,621 | 34.0 | |
| Labour gain from Conservative | | Swing | | |
