= Rickerby =

Village in Cumbria, England

Coordinates: 54.904°N 2.915°W

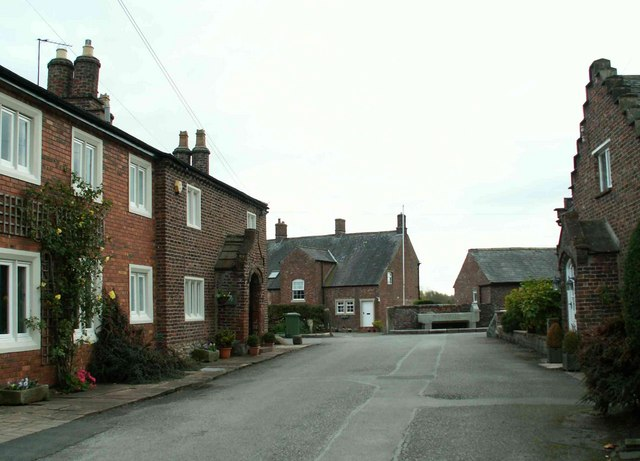
- Rickerby

- Location in the former Carlisle district, Cumbria Location within Cumbria
- OS grid reference: NY414570
- Civil parish: Stanwix Rural
- Unitary authority: Cumberland
- Ceremonial county: Cumbria
- Region: North West
- Country: England
- Sovereign state: United Kingdom
- Post town: CARLISLE
- Postcode district: CA3
- Dialling code: 01228
- Police: Cumbria
- Fire: Cumbria
- Ambulance: North West
- UK Parliament: Carlisle

Rickerby is a village in the civil parish of Stanwix Rural, in the Cumberland district, in the county of Cumbria, England. It is situated near Carlisle, next to the River Eden. In 1870-72 the township had a population of 97. The property belonged to Richard de Tilliol of Scaleby Castle, whose descendant Adam de Rickerby lived in the village in about 1230. Rickerby Park is nearby.

== See also ==
- Listed buildings in Stanwix Rural
