= Scaleby Castle =

Castle in Cumbria, England

- Scaleby, Cumbria, England
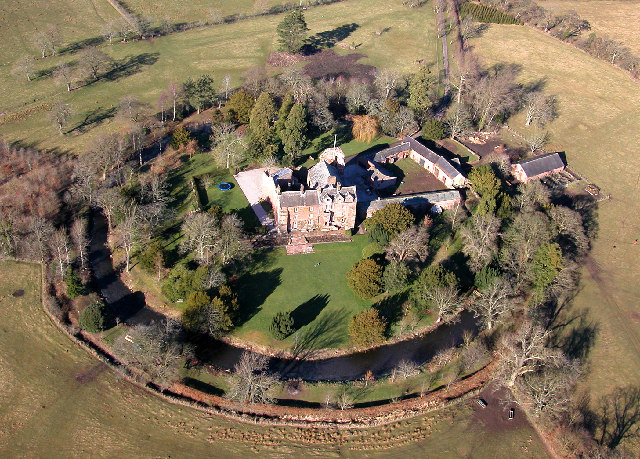
- Aerial photograph of Scaleby Castle

Site information
- Owner: Private

Location
- Location in the former Carlisle district, Cumbria Scaleby Castle (Cumbria)
- Coordinates: 54.9532°N 2.8619°W
- Grid reference: grid reference NY449624

Site history
- Materials: Stone
- Events: English Civil War

Scaleby Castle is in the village of Scaleby, Cumbria, England. The castle was originally built in the early 14th century, and extended in the 15th century to form a substantial fortification. Parliamentary troops attacked the castle twice during the English Civil War, burning it. It was later restored to form a country house.

== Details ==
Robert de Tilliol built Scaleby Castle after 1307, next to the village of Scaleby, 6 miles (9.7 km) from Carlisle. The Tilliols were a well-established family in the region from the reign of Henry I onwards, and Robert was given the land for the castle by Edward I and granted the authority to build a castle by Edward II. The initial castle comprised two sets of buildings, linked by a small courtyard and protected by a curtain wall on both sides, surrounded by a large, circular, water-filled moat approximately 7.4 metres (24 ft) wide, and an inner moat, since largely destroyed.

The male Tilliol line died out in 1435; the castle then passed by marriage to the Colville family. They rebuilt much of the castle in the late 15th century, including remodelling the pele tower, the great hall and the gateway, complete with a polygonal barbican. The pele tower formed a substantial fortification, about 40 feet (12 m) by 30 feet (9.1 m) across, with three floors and thick walls. The Musgrave family acquired the castle and Sir Edward Musgrave rebuilt the south range of the castle in 1596.

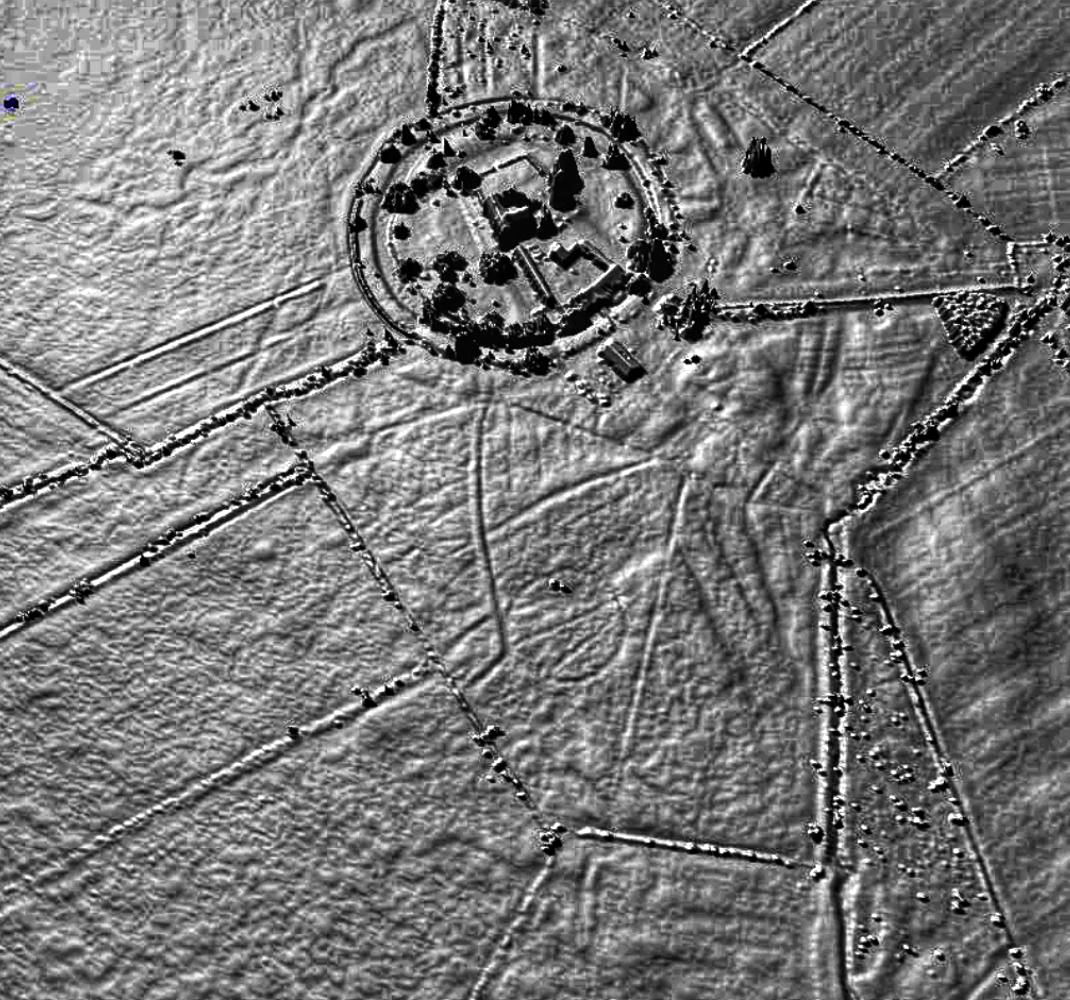
A lidar view of Scaleby Castle

In 1641, the English Civil War broke out between the Royalist supporters of Charles I and Parliament. Sir Edward's grandson, another Sir Edward Musgrave, was a strong Royalist supporter and declared for the king. In February 1645, Parliamentary forces besieging nearby Carlisle also besieged and eventually seized Scaleby Castle, causing considerable damage; Edward recovered the castle, but in at the start of the Second English Civil War in 1648 he again took up arms on behalf of the king. This time the castle immediately fell to Parliamentary forces, who set fire to it.

Sir Edward was heavily in debt so he sold the castle after the war to Richard Gilpin, who restored the property c. 1800. The property remained in the hand of the Gilpins until it fell into disrepair; it was restored once again by Rowland Fawcett. In 1847 James Fawcett was resident there.

Today the castle is a Grade I listed building and a scheduled monument. It is the seat of Oliver Eden, 8th Baron Henley.

== See also ==
- Grade I listed buildings in Cumbria
- Listed buildings in Scaleby
- Castles in Great Britain and Ireland
- List of castles in England

== Bibliography ==
- Mackenzie, James D. (1896). The Castles of England: Their Story and Structure, Vol II. New York: Macmillan. OCLC 504892038. "mackenzie story and structure."
- Pettifer, Adrian (2002). English Castles: A Guide by Counties. Woodbridge, UK: Boydell Press. ISBN 9780851157825.
- Taylor, Michael Waistell (1892). Old Manorial Halls of Westmorland and Cumberland. Kendal, UK: T. Wilson.
