= George Head Head =

English politician and business owner (c.1795-1876)

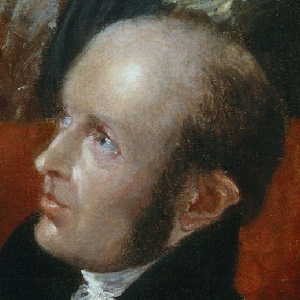
- Head in 1840.
- Born: c.1795
- Died: 12 December 1876 (aged 81)
- Occupation: Banker

George Head Head (c.1795 – 12 December 1876) was a mayor, magistrate, banker and mine owner in Carlisle. The bank was started by his father, but was improved and rebuilt in his lifetime. He attended an important convention in 1840 on Anti-Slavery, where a painting records his involvement.

== Biography ==
George Head Head was born to a successful banker (J .M. Head) who had a private bank called J.M.Head and Co.. His father had started the bank in his grocers shop and it was passed on to George, who continued to run it at its original location on Botchergate in Carlisle. Eventually Head had the first local building built that was intended to be a bank.

From 1835 until his death in 1876 Head was the principal shareholder of the Greenside Mine, a profitable lead mine near Glenridding in Westmorland.

In 1840, Head journeyed to London to attend the World's Anti-Slavery Convention on 12 June 1840. The picture above shows him in a painting made to commemorate the event which attracted delegates from America, France, Haiti, Australia, Ireland, Jamaica and Barbados.

He was the High Sheriff of Cumberland in 1851 and Deputy Lieutenant in 1852.

Head's first wife, Maria Woodrouffe Head, died in 1854. He married Sarah Gurney on 1 May 1858 in West Ham. Sarah's late father was Samuel Gurney ("The Bankers' Banker") of Upton, Essex

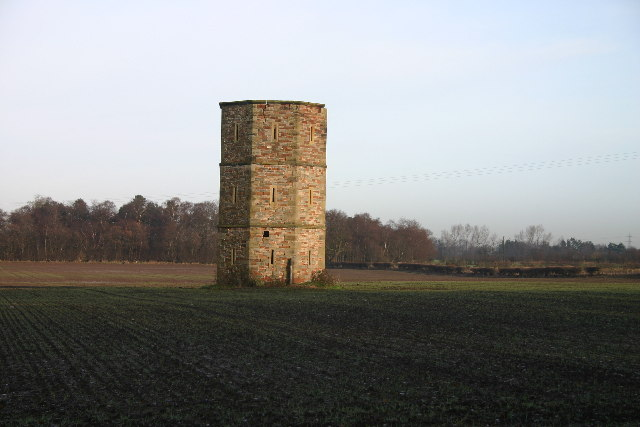
The Octagonal Folly that was built by George Head Head near Rickerby

Head's bank was demolished in 1865, when it was amalgamated with the Cumberland Union Bank.

He owned Rickerby Hall which today stands in the public area called Rickerby Park. He is particularly noted for commissioning a large octagonal tower. This folly is an important local landmark.

Head was interested in book collecting and supported the anti-slavery movement. He died in 1876 and his adopted heir Miles MacInnes, a justice of the Peace, succeeded to the 940 acres (3.8 km^{2}) of Rickerby. MacInnes acquired Rickerby Park at Carlisle. He had been adopted as heir to George Head Head and he was a distant relative of his wives who were both childless. MacInnes was left £160,000 and the estate on the understanding that he would use Head's coat of arms and the surname "Head". Macinness did not take on the surname but did enjoy the inheritance.

Head's monument in Carlisle St Michael's church and the plaques to his two wives are all grade two listed constructions.
