= New Model Inn =

The Redfern Inn at Etterby, Carlisle

The New Model Inn was a style of English public house championed and designed by Harry Redfern under the State Management Scheme which had the aim of reducing drunkenness among munitions workers.

All but one of the scheme's 14 public houses were built in the Carlisle district. Arts and Crafts styles were used throughout. The final example, completed in 1940 at Etterby, Carlisle, was named the Redfern Inn.
