= Listed buildings in Scaleby =

Scaleby is a civil parish in the Cumberland district of Cumbria, England. It contains 16 buildings that are recorded in the National Heritage List for England. Of these, one is listed at Grade I, the highest of the three grades, and the others are at Grade II, the lowest grade. The parish contains the village of Scaleby, and is otherwise rural. The most important building in the parish is Scaleby Castle; this and associated structures are listed. The other listed buildings include houses, farmhouses and farm buildings, a church, a former chapel, a church hall, a war memorial, and a milestone.

== Key ==
Grade	Criteria
I	Buildings of exceptional interest, sometimes considered to be internationally important
II	Buildings of national importance and special interest

== Buildings ==
Name and location	Photograph	Date	Notes	Grade
All Saints Church; 54.95979°N 2.86518°W		Early 13th century	The tower dates from the early 14th century, and the church was restored in 1827–28 and in 1860–62, when the east end was rebuilt. It is built in large blocks of sandstone, probably from the Roman Wall, and has a green slate roof with coped gables and a cross finial. The church consists of a combined nave and chancel, a south porch, and a fortified west tower. The tower has three stages, very thick walls on a chamfered plinth, slit windows, a battlemented parapet, and corner pinnacles. The body of the church has buttresses, a round-headed south doorway, and lancet windows.	II
Scaleby Castle; 54.95367°N 2.86173°W		Late 13th century (probable)	The castle was largely rebuilt in the 15th century, a wing was added in the 16th century, it was altered in the late 17th century and remodelled in about 1838, possibly by Thomas Rickman. The castle is built in sandstone, the earliest parts with stone taken from the Roman Wall. The castle consists of a four-storey tower, largely in ruins, a three-storey three-bay great hall, a two-storey polygonal curtain tower with an open roof, and a two-storey gatehouse. The south range has three storeys and is in two builds, each with three bays, and with a garderobe turret in the middle. The east part has three gabled dormers, sash windows in the main floor and 19th-century windows below. In the west part the windows are in Tudor style. The moated site on which the castle stands is a Scheduled Monument.	I
Bridge over moat, Scaleby Castle; 54.95423°N 2.86110°W	—	17th century (probable)	The bridge carries a road over the moat. It is in sandstone and has been repaired on a number of occasions. The bridge consists of a single segmental arch carrying a single track. Its abutments form the side walls of the moat, and there is a later brick parapet.	II
Gate piers and wall, Scaleby Castle; 54.95397°N 2.86170°W	—	Late 17th century	The square gate piers have brick columns with recessed panels on a chamfered sandstone plinth, hood moulds, chamfered caps and ball finials. There are high brick walls on each side, the wall to the right having been reduced in height and partly demolished.	II
Hitchin's Onset; 54.96114°N 2.86167°W	—	Late 17th or early 18th century (probable)	A cruck-framed cottage that was extended probably in the late 18th century. It has clay walls repaired in brick and sandstone, and the extensions at the ends and the rear are in sandstone. The cottage has a single storey with an attic, the original part in three bays and the extensions each in one bay.	II
High Hill; 54.96000°N 2.85285°W	—	Early 18th century (probable)	The house was extended in the 19th century. It has clay walls, extensions in sandstone with quoins, and a roof of green slate with some Welsh slate and some sandstone slate. There is a single storey, the original house has three bays, and the extensions to the sides are of one bay each. On the front is a wooden porch, and the windows are casements in plain surrounds. The left extension was originally a granary, and has small windows, dove holes, and external steps leading to a loft.	II
Fordsyke and barn 54.96061°N 2.84930°W	—	1765	A brick farmhouse with sandstone dressings and a slate roof. There are two storeys and three bays. The doorway has a chamfered surround, and the sash windows have plain sandstone surrounds. To the left is an L-shaped sandstone barn with a Welsh slate roof; it contains plank doors and ventilation slits.	II
Woodhead and outbuilding 54.95583°N 2.83888°W	—	Late 18th century	The farmhouse is in sandstone with a slate roof, and has two storeys and four bays. The doorway and sash windows have plain surrounds. To the right is a two-storey outbuilding with clay walls.	II
Stables, Scaleby Castle; 54.95406°N 2.86126°W		Late 18th or early 19th century	The stables are in sandstone and brick with sandstone dressings and Welsh slate roofs with some sandstone slate. They are on four sides surrounding a courtyard, they are in a single storey with lofts, and have numerous bays. Some doors have flat heads, others are rounded, and the windows are a mix of sashes, casements and slat vents.	II
Milestone; 54.97157°N 2.84110°W	—	1807 (probable)	The milestone was provided for the Brampton to Longtown Turnpike. It is in sandstone and consists of a square stone set at an angle and inscribed on the faces with the distances in miles to Brampton and to Longtown.	II
Church Close; 54.95968°N 2.86450°W	—	Early 19th century	A sandstone house with a hipped slate roof, in a single storey and with two bays. At the side entrance is a gabled pedimented porch, and a doorway with a pointed arch. The windows are sashes with chamfered stone surrounds and hood moulds.	II
Church Hall; 54.95949°N 2.86552°W		Early 19th century	Originally a school, the church hall is in sandstone on a chamfered plinth, with quoins, shaped eaves modillions, and a Welsh slate roof with coped gables. The hall is in a single storey with two bays, and has a gabled porch, a doorway with a pointed arch, a chamfered surround, and a fanlight, and on the gable is a bellcote. The windows are casements with chamfered surrounds and diamond panes.	II
Wesley Cottage; 54.96395°N 2.87647°W		1828	A former Methodist chapel, to which a porch was added in 1883. The building is in sandstone with quoins and a hipped slate roof. It has a square plan, a single storey, and two bays. The gabled porch has a doorway with a pointed arch and a false keystone. This is flanked by casement windows with pointed arches and false keystones. On the sides of the building are casement windows with flat heads. (Note: Street View in November 2010 shows that the chapel has been converted for residential use)	II
Longpark; 54.94840°N 2.89731°W	—	1831	A brick farmhouse on a chamfered sandstone plinth, with sandstone quoins and a slate roof. There are two storeys and three bays. The doorway has reeded pilaster strips, an open moulded pediment and a radial fanlight, and the windows are sashes with plain stone surrounds.	II
Scaleby Hall; 54.95976°N 2.85632°W	—	1834	A country house in sandstone on a chamfered plinth, with quoins, a plain cornice, a large wooden eaves cornice with modillions forming a gabled pediment, and a green slate roof. There are two storeys with an attic and five bays, a single-storey two-bay extension to the right, and a two-storey four-bay extension to the rear. On the front is a prostyle porch with unfluted Ionic columns, a moulded entablature and cornice, and a cast iron balcony. The doorway has pilaster strips, a moulded architrave, and a fanlight. The windows are sashes.	II
War memorial 54.95967°N 2.86376°W		1920	The war memorial stands in front of the village hall. It is in Scottish grey granite, and is in the form of a wheel-head Celtic cross. On the front of the cross is a central boss surrounded by knotwork carvings. The shaft tapers, and stands on a two-tiered moulded base. On the base is an inscription, the names of those lost in the First World War, and the names of those who served and returned.	II

== Notes and references ==
=== Sources ===
- Historic England, "Church of All Saints, Scaleby (1335573)", National Heritage List for England
- Historic England, "Scaleby Castle, Scaleby (1311782)", National Heritage List for England
- Historic England, "Scaleby Castle moated site, Scaleby (1019762)", National Heritage List for England
- Historic England, "Bridge over moat north-east of Scaleby Castle, Scaleby (1311759)", National Heritage List for England
- Historic England, "Gate piers and wall north of Scaleby Castle, Scaleby (1087602)", National Heritage List for England
- Historic England, "Hitchin's Onset, Scaleby (1087600)", National Heritage List for England
- Historic England, "High Hill, Scaleby (1311803)", National Heritage List for England
- Historic England, "Fordsyke and adjoining barn, Scaleby (1087599)", National Heritage List for England
- Historic England, "Woodhead and outbuilding adjoining to right, Scaleby (1087604)", National Heritage List for England
- Historic England, "Stables east of Scaleby Castle, Scaleby (1087601)", National Heritage List for England
- Historic England, "Milestone at NGR NY 46270 64430, Scaleby (1146389)", National Heritage List for England
- Historic England, "Church Close, Scaleby (1311838)", National Heritage List for England
- Historic England, "Church Hall, Scaleby (1087594)", National Heritage List for England
- Historic England, "Wesley Cottage, Scaleby (1146520)", National Heritage List for England
- Historic England, "Longpark to north-east of Cedar Lodge, Scaleby (1087603)", National Heritage List for England
- Historic England, "Scaleby Hall, Scaleby (1335574)", National Heritage List for England
- Historic England, "Scaleby War Memorial, Scaleby (1463523)", National Heritage List for England
- Historic England, Listed Buildings
- Hyde, Matthew; Pevsner, Nikolaus (2010) [1967], Cumbria, The Buildings of England, New Haven and London: Yale University Press, ISBN 978-0-300-12663-1
