= Walby (surname) =

Walby is a surname. It derives from Walby in Cumbria, England, or Waulby near Kingston upon Hull.

Notable people with the surname include:

- Chris Walby (born 1956), Canadian football player and sportscaster
- Steffon Walby (born 1972), American ice hockey player and coach
- Sylvia Walby, British sociologist
- Tony Walby (born 1973), Canadian judoka

Michael Walby (born 1976), Corporate lawyer, Solicitor of the Supreme Court
