= Cummersdale =

Coordinates: 54.869835°N 2.952033°W

- Village and parish
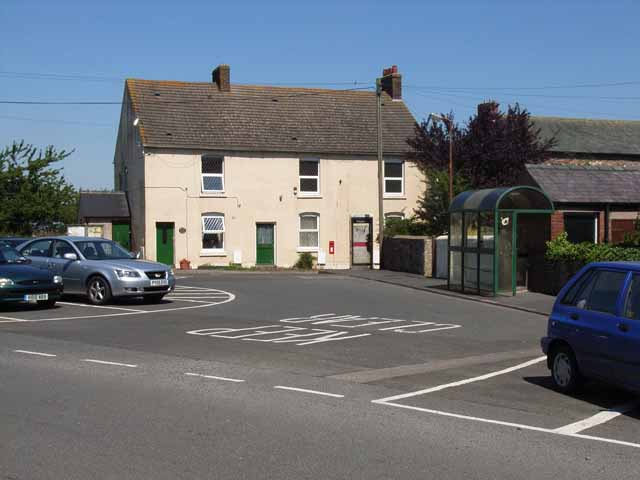
- Village centre, Cummersdale

- Location within Cumbria
- Population: 1,570 (2021)
- OS grid reference: NY390531
- Civil parish: Cummersdale
- Unitary authority: Cumberland
- Ceremonial county: Cumbria
- Region: North West
- Country: England
- Sovereign state: United Kingdom
- Post town: Carlisle
- Postcode district: CA2
- Dialling code: 01228
- Police: Cumbria
- Fire: Cumbria
- Ambulance: North West
- UK Parliament: Carlisle

Cummersdale is a village and civil parish in Cumbria, England, just outside the southern outskirts of Carlisle. Excavations have taken place in Cummersdale. Notable landmarks include the Cummersdale Viaduct and the Spinners Arms. In 2021, the parish had a population of 1,570.

== See also ==
- Listed buildings in Cummersdale
