= State Management Scheme =

British state owned alcohol business

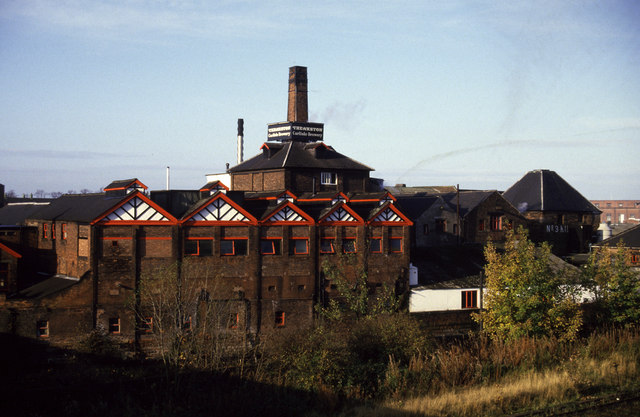
The State Management Scheme brewery, 1916–1971

The State Management Scheme was the nationalisation of the brewing, distribution and sale of liquor in three districts of the United Kingdom from 1916 until 1973.

== History ==
The main focus of the scheme, now commonly known as the Carlisle Experiment, was Carlisle and the surrounding district close to the armament factories at Gretna, founded in 1916 to supply explosives and shells to the British Army in the First World War.

There were three schemes in total: Carlisle and Gretna, Cromarty Firth, and Enfield. In 1921, Carlisle and Gretna was split into two separate areas. Carlisle was the larger part and supplied some beer to Gretna. In 1922 the Enfield scheme ended and its public houses were sold back to private enterprise.

The scheme was privatised by Edward Heath's Conservative Government after the passage of the Licensing (Abolition of State Management) Act 1971. Between 1973 and 1974, the assets of the scheme were sold off.

== Ethos ==
A central pillar of the scheme was the ethos of disinterested management: public house managers did not accept tips and had salaries, so they had no incentive to sell liquor, which supported the aim of reducing drunkenness and its effects on the arms industry. From 1916 to 1919 the scheme had a "no treating" policy, forbidding the buying of rounds of drinks.

The Redfern Inn at Etterby, Carlisle

== Architecture ==
The scheme also involved the refurbishment of public houses, and the demolition and replacement of substandard premises. Most of the new premises were designed by the scheme's chief architect, Harry Redfern in his New Model Inn style, which influenced the design of public houses in the rest of the UK.
