= County Borough of Carlisle =

Former English government district

Coordinates: 54.8951°N 2.9334°W

City of Carlisle
- Area
  - 1901: 2,025 acres (8.19 km^{2})
  - 1931: 4,488 acres (18.16 km^{2})
  - 1961: 6,092 acres (24.65 km^{2})
- Population
  - 1901: 45,840
  - 1931: 57,304
  - 1971: 71,580
- History
  - Created: 1835 (Municipal Corporations Act 1835)
  - Abolished: 1974 (Local Government Act 1972)
  - Succeeded by: City of Carlisle
- Status: Municipal borough (1835–1914); County borough (1914–1974)
- Government
  - HQ: Carlisle
  - Motto: Be Just and Fear Not
- Coat of arms

Carlisle was, from 1835 to 1974, a local government district in the northwest of England, coterminate with Carlisle. In 1835, following the Municipal Corporations Act 1835, Carlisle was constituted a municipal borough of Cumberland, but was promoted to county borough status in 1914, within its boundaries taking over the functions of Cumberland County Council. The district was abolished on 31 March 1974 by the Local Government Act 1972.

== Carlisle corporation prior to 1835 ==
Carlisle was a borough by prescription, and received its first royal charter from Henry II. It enjoyed the title of "city" by virtue of being the see of an Anglican bishop from 1133. The original charter was lost in 1292 when much of the city was destroyed by fire. In 1352 Edward III granted the city a new charter which confirmed the rights previously enjoyed, and created a close corporation consisting of a mayor and bailiffs. Among the privileges granted to the corporation were the holding of a sixteen-day market beginning on the Feast of the Assumption and the right to the King's fishery in the River Eden.

The charter by which the city was governed prior to the 1835 reforms was that granted by Charles I in 1615. This created a corporation by the name of the Mayor, Aldermen, Bailiffs and Citizens of the City of Carlisle. There were twelve aldermen, one of whom was elected mayor, two coroners and twenty-four capital citizens. The right of election to the body was vested in the free burgesses, who consisted of members of eight fraternities or guilds of the city, namely the Merchants, Tanners, Skinners, Butchers, Smiths, Weavers, Tailors and Shoemakers. Burgesses, of which there were estimated to be about a thousand in 1835, did not have to be resident in the city. Elections were held annually at a general meeting on Ascension Day.

== The reformed borough ==
Following the report of a royal commission investigating municipal corporations throughout England and Wales, 178 boroughs were reformed as "municipal boroughs" under the Municipal Corporations Act 1835. The Act introduced a uniform constitution for each borough, which was governed by a town or city council consisting of a mayor, aldermen and councillors. Elections were held annually on 1 November, with one third of councillors retiring each year. There was one alderman for every three councillors, with half of the aldermanic bench being elected by the council itself every three years. The councillors and aldermen elected a mayor from among their number each year. The electorate was widened to include all ten pound householders within the borough. Non-resident freemen no longer had the vote unless they lived within seven miles (11 km) of the city. Later legislation periodically widened the franchise.

The reformed city and municipal borough of Carlisle had an area of 1,800 acres (7.3 km^{2}), as opposed to the old borough which was limited to 80 acres (320,000 m^{2}). The city council consisted of thirty councillors and ten aldermen, with the city divided into ten wards each represented by three councillors and one alderman. The boundaries were enlarged in 1887 and 1912.

Between 1866 and 1906 the borough included the whole or parts of the following civil parishes – Eaglesfield Abbey, Botchergate, Rickergate, Caldewgate, St Cuthberts Within and St Marys Within. In 1906 these were all merged into a single parish called Carlisle whose boundaries were the same as the borough and changed at the same times as the borough's did.

== County borough ==
The Local Government Act 1888 had divided England and Wales into a system of county councils and county boroughs. Under the Act any municipal borough could, on reaching a population of 50,000, apply to become a county borough, independent of the county council. Carlisle made a successful application in 1913, and on 1 April 1914 became a county borough, for its own area taking over the functions of Cumberland County Council. The county borough boundaries were enlarged in 1951.

== Coat of arms ==
The ancient Carlisle Corporation used a coat of arms from at least 1462. This was a gold shield bearing a red cross pattée between four red roses. A fifth rose, gold in colour was placed in the centre of the cross.

The reformed corporation adopted a completely different coat of arms in 1835, blazoned as Vert on a base barry wavy of six argent and azure, a castle between two roses Or, on a chief gules a lion passant guardant Or. This coat of arms was depicted on a 1610 map of the city engraved by John Speed. The arms had apparently never been used by the corporation prior to 1835, and were probably invented by Speed himself.

By 1915 both coats were in use, and were sometimes displayed side by side. The motto "Be Just And Fear Not" had been adopted. Neither coat, however, was on record at the College of Arms. On 7 July 1924 an official grant by letters patent was made. This featured the ancient arms, topped by a castle in place of a crest, and supported by two red wyverns, with gold roses on their wings.

The arms were blazoned as follows:

Or on a Cross patée between four Roses Gules a Rose of the field barbed and seeded proper. The Shield ensigned by a Mural Crown having three Towers Or and lined Gules the centre Tower pierced by a Gateway Gules. And for Supporters Upon a Mount Vert on either side a Wyvern Gules armed and langued Azure the wings semée of Roses Or barbed Vert.

== Abolition ==
The Local Government Act 1972 reorganised administration throughout England and Wales from 1 April 1974. The area of the county borough was merged with the surrounding Border Rural District to form a new City of Carlisle, one of six districts of the non-metropolitan county of Cumbria.
