= Houghton, Cumbria =

Village in Cumbria, England

Coordinates: 54.925°N 2.924°W

Houghton
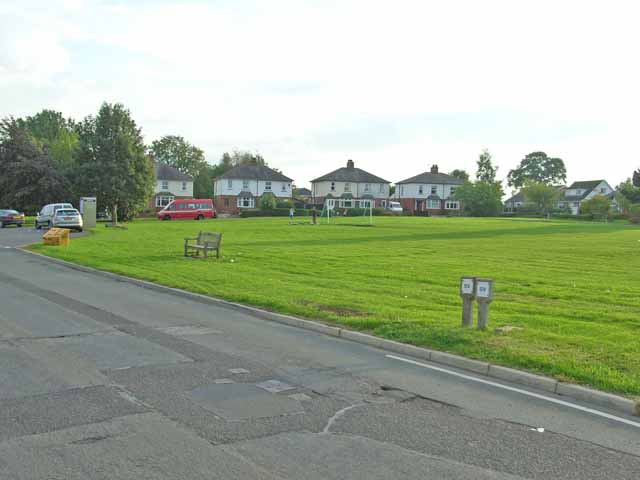
- Houghton village green

- Location in the former Carlisle district, Cumbria Location within Cumbria
- Area: 0.378 km^{2} (0.146 sq mi)
- Population: 1,168 (2018 estimate)
  - Density: 3,090/km^{2} (8,000/sq mi)
- OS grid reference: NY407593
- Civil parish: Stanwix Rural
- Unitary authority: Cumberland
- Ceremonial county: Cumbria
- Region: North West
- Country: England
- Sovereign state: United Kingdom
- Post town: CARLISLE
- Postcode district: CA3
- Dialling code: 01228
- Police: Cumbria
- Fire: Cumbria
- Ambulance: North West
- UK Parliament: Carlisle

Houghton is a village to the north of Carlisle in Cumberland, Cumbria, England. It is the largest settlement in the civil parish of Stanwix Rural. Hadrian's Wall runs past the village to the south along past Whiteclosegate. In 2018, it had an estimated population of 1,168. In the Imperial Gazetteer of England and Wales of 1870-72 the township had a population of 369.

A large garden centre has opened in the grounds of Houghton Hall, a grade II listed structure.

== See also ==
- Listed buildings in Stanwix Rural
