= Harry Redfern =

English architect (1861–1950)

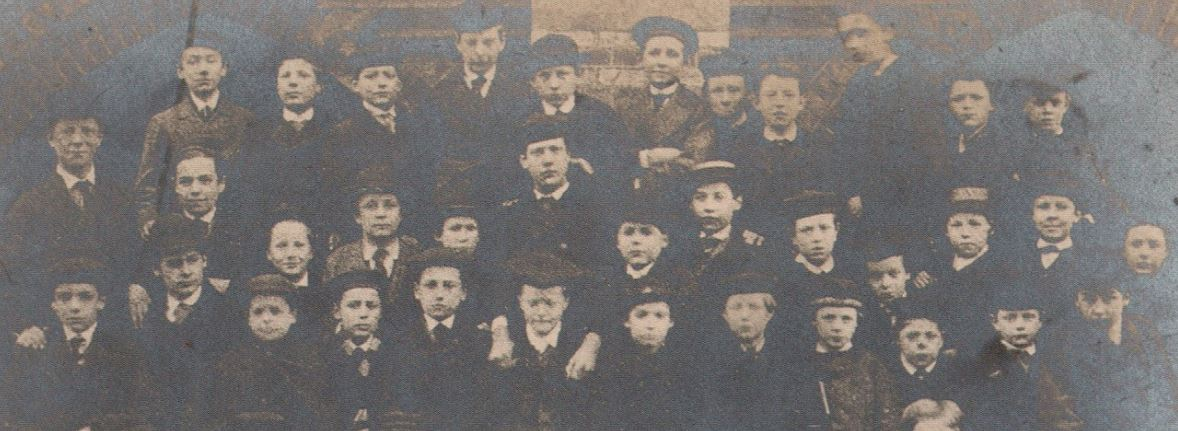
- Harry Redfern, 1873 Abingdon School (bottom row, 4th from left, with scarf)
- Born: Harry Redfern; April 1861; Berwick St John, Wiltshire, England
- Died: 6 March 1950 (aged 88); Ealing, England
- Occupation: Architect
- Projects: State Management Scheme
- Design: New Model Inn

Henry "Harry" Redfern (April 1861 – 6 March 1950) was an English architect.

== Early life ==
Redfern was educated at Abingdon School from 1871 to 1876, and was articled to Henry Woodyer in 1876. He subsequently worked for William Butterfield, Alfred Lawers, Alfred Young Nutt, Peter Dollar, and William Young. He established an independent practice in Derby in 1889, then worked in partnership with J. J. Stevenson from 1896 until Stevenson's death in 1908. He became a Fellow of the Royal Institute of British Architects in 1903.

== Career ==
Redfern designed work in Oxford, Cambridge, Abingdon and Carlisle. At the University of Cambridge he was the architect of the chemical, metallurgical, physical and biological laboratories, and restored portions of Christ's College and Magdalene College. At Oxford he carried out additions and restoration work at Oriel College and St John's College; and was architect of the biochemistry laboratories.

At Abingdon he completed work at St Michael's church, the Malthouse, designed the lodge at Abingdon School (where he was educated) and restored the school's Roysse Room (1911). He was responsible for designing, in an imaginative and varied manner, a number of notable public houses in the Carlisle district, as chief architect of the Home Office State Management Scheme (SMS). The scheme built fourteen New Model Inns to Redfern's designs, with a strong theme of the Arts and Crafts movement. He was particularly interested in restoring and designing churches.

He was commemorated towards the end of his work for the SMS by the naming of the Redfern Inn (1938), one of the distinctive New Model Inn designs, in Etterby, a district of Carlisle. The Redfern was designed by his assistant architect, Joseph Seddon FRIBA (with Redfern's collaboration). It was a tribute to a man who had dedicated his talents to the quest for an improved public house style.

Redfern practised from Porchester Gardens, London, and later lived at St Dunstan's Gardens, Ealing. He was author of the article: Some Recollections of William Butterfield and Henry Woodyer (1950).

His obituary is found in the Journal of the RIBA following his death on 6 March 1950.

== See also ==
- List of Old Abingdonians
