= Stanwix Rural =

Civil parish in Cumbria, England

- Civil parish
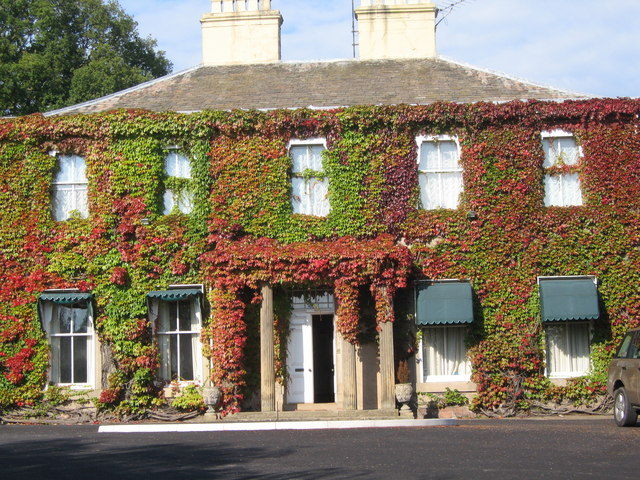
- Houghton Hall
- Interactive map of Stanwix Rural
- Coordinates: 54.933°N 2.884°W
- Country: England
- Primary council: Cumberland
- County: Cumbria
- Region: North West England
- Status: Civil parish
- Main settlements: Brunstock, Houghton, High Crosby, Linstock, Low Crosby, Rickerby, Tarraby and parts of Harker and Whiteclosegate

Government
  - UK Parliament: Carlisle

Population (2011)
  - Total: 2,923
- Postal code: CA6 4QW

Stanwix Rural is a civil parish in the Cumberland district of Cumbria, England, immediately to the north east of Carlisle itself – parts of the Carlisle urban area are in the parish boundaries.

The parish includes the villages and hamlets of Brunstock, Houghton, High Crosby, Linstock, Low Crosby, Rickerby, Tarraby and parts of Harker and Whiteclosegate.

Before 1966 the parish was simply called Stanwix although the village of Stanwix itself had been, in 1912, incorporated into the city, civil parish and municipal borough of Carlisle.

The parish was subject to various boundary changes between 1866 and 1934 when it absorbed the former civil parish of Crosby-on-Eden.

The River Eden forms the southern edge of the parish and the M6 motorway and A689 road both run through the area.

== Governance ==
An electoral ward in the same name exists. This ward includes the parish of Irthington and surrounding areas with a total population taken at the 2011 census of 4,639.

== See also ==
- Listed buildings in Stanwix Rural
