= Carlisle (district, 1974–2023) =

Former district in Cumbria, England

City of Carlisle
- Former non-metropolitan district and city
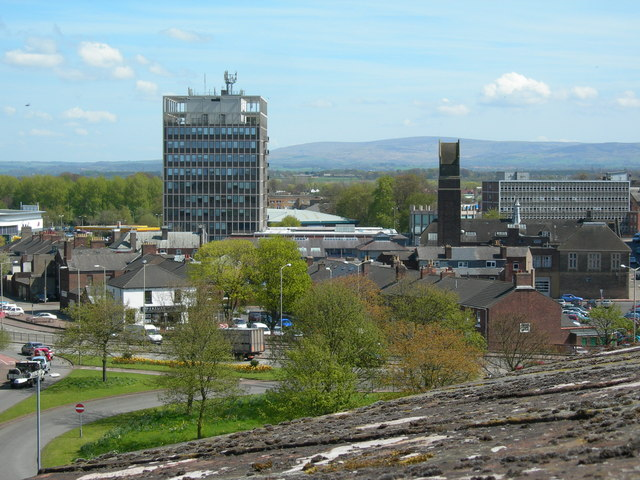
- Carlisle Civic Centre in Rickergate

- Coat of arms Council logo
- Motto: "Be Just and Fear Not"
- Carlisle shown within Cumbria
- Click the map for an interactive fullscreen view
- Coordinates: 54°53′27″N 2°56′38″W
- Sovereign state: United Kingdom
- Country: England
- Ceremonial county: Cumbria
- Historic county: Cumberland
- Admin HQ: Carlisle
- Founded: 1 April 1974
- Abolished: 31 March 2023

Government
  - Type: City
  - Governing body: Carlisle City Council

Area
  - Total: 401.53 sq mi (1,039.97 km^{2})

Population (2021)
  - Total: 110,255
  - Density: 274.584/sq mi (106.017/km^{2})
  - Ethnicity: 97.6% White; 0.9% South Asian; 0.6% Mixed; 0.2% Black; 0.5% Chinese or Other
- Time zone: UTC+0 (Greenwich Mean Time)
- Postcode: CA postcode area
- ONS code: 16UD (ONS); E07000028 (GSS)
- OS grid reference: NY394555
- Website: www.carlisle.gov.uk

The City of Carlisle (/kɑːrˈlaɪl/ kar-LYLE, locally /ˈkɑːrlaɪl/ KAR-lyle) was a local government district of Cumbria, England, with the status of a city. It was named after its largest settlement, Carlisle, but covered a far larger area which included the towns of Brampton and Longtown, as well as outlying villages including Dalston, Scotby and Wetheral. In 2011 the district had a population of 107,524, and an area of 1,039.97 square kilometres (402 sq mi).

The district boundaries were set as part of the provisions of the Local Government Act 1972, and covered an amalgamation of two former local government districts, the City and County Borough of Carlisle and the Border Rural District of Cumberland. The district shared a border with Scotland (to the north), and was bounded on the southwest by the borough of Allerdale, and on the south by the district of Eden. The county of Northumberland was to the east.

Although the district boundaries dated to the 20th century, the city traces its origins to a 1st-century Roman outpost associated with Hadrian's Wall. The Brythonic settlement that expanded from this outpost was destroyed by the Danes in 875. Thereafter the region formed part of the Southern Uplands of Scotland, until colonised under King William II of England in 1092. William II built Carlisle Castle, which houses a military museum. Carlisle Cathedral, founded in the 12th century, is one of the smallest in England.

A border city, and the third most northerly city in England, Carlisle district predominantly spanned the flood plain of the River Eden. Commercially, it was linked to the rest of England via the M6 motorway, and to the Scottish Lowlands via the A74(M) and M74 motorways.

In July 2021 the Ministry of Housing, Communities and Local Government announced that in April 2023, Cumbria would be reorganised into two unitary authorities. On 1 April 2023, Carlisle City Council was abolished and its functions transferred to the new unitary authority of Cumberland, which also incorporates the former districts of Allerdale and Copeland. Charter trustees maintain the historic rights and privileges of Carlisle, including the mayoralty.

== History ==
Following both the Local Government Act 1888 and Local Government Act 1894, local government in England had been administered via a national framework of rural districts, urban districts, municipal boroughs and county boroughs, which (apart from the latter which were independent), shared power with strategic county councils of the administrative counties. The areas that were incorporated into the City of Carlisle district in 1974 had formed part of the Border Rural District from the administrative county of Cumberland, and the politically independent County Borough of Carlisle.

After the exploration of reform during the mid-20th century such as the proposals made by the Redcliffe-Maud Report in the late 1960s, the Local Government Act 1972 restructured local government in England by creating a system of two-tier metropolitan and non-metropolitan counties and districts throughout the country. The act formally established the City of Carlisle as a local government district of the new shire county of Cumbria on 1 April 1974. The new dual local authorities of Carlisle City Council and Cumbria County Council had been running since elections in 1973 however. The leading article in The Times on the day the Local Government Act came into effect claimed that the "new arrangement is a compromise which seeks to reconcile familiar geography which commands a certain amount of affection and loyalty, with the scale of operations on which modern planning methods can work effectively".

== Governance ==
=== Parliamentary constituencies ===
The residents of the City of Carlisle district were represented in the House of Commons of the United Kingdom by members of parliament (MPs) for two parliamentary constituencies. At the 2019 general election, Conservative Party MPs won the seats of Carlisle and Penrith and The Border, John Stevenson and Neil Hudson respectively.

=== Council ===
In 1974, Carlisle City Council was created to administer the newly formed non-metropolitan district, which shared power with the strategic Cumbria County Council. The council offices were in Carlisle, at the Civic Centre. The Labour Party controlled the council for much of the first 25 years and from 1979 to the 1999 election had an overall majority. Until 2003 the Conservative Party then controlled the council with a majority, and from the 2003 elections they ran the council with no majority, but in alliance with the Liberal Democrats. At the 2012 election Labour gained a majority of the seats, which they held until the 2019 local election when the Conservative Party retook the council with the backing of the one Liberal Democrat, one UKIP councillor, and an Independent. In May 2021, three city council by-elections took place, triggered by the departure of three Labour councillors, that resulted in two Conservative gains from Labour.

In November 2021, the former chair of the Labour Party, Jo Ellis-Williams, joined the Conservatives to give overall control of the council to the Conservative Party.

==== Electoral wards ====
There were 39 councillors representing the electoral wards of the City of Carlisle district. Together they formed the Carlisle City Council. Councillors were elected and accountable to the residents of their wards.

Ward names	Population	Councillors' party
Belah & Kingmoor	6,884	2 Conservatives, 1 Green
Botcherby & Harraby North	8,728	3 Independents
Brampton & Fellside	7,877	2 Conservatives, 1 Independent
Cathedral & Castle	9,839	3 Labour
Currock & Upperby	9,447	3 Labour
Dalston & Burgh	6,424	2 Conservatives, 1 Liberal Democrat
Denton Holme & Morton South	8,239	3 Labour
Harraby South & Parklands	8,526	2 Conservative, 1 Labour
Longtown & the Border	7,539	2 Conservatives, 1 Liberal Democrat
Newtown & Morton North	9,437	2 Labour, 1 Conservative
Sandsfield & Morton West	8,679	2 Conservatives, 1 Labour
Stanwix & Houghton	8,632	2 Conservatives, 1 Independent
Wetheral & Corby	7,237	3 Conservatives

==== Parishes ====
Civil parishes form the bottom tier of local government in England; parish councils are consulted on planning applications and commonly manage some local services, such as allotments, burial grounds, bus shelters, car parks, and commons. The City of Carlisle district was almost entirely parished, the exception being the central settlement of Carlisle—an unparished area. As of 2008, there were 36 civil parishes in the district, which were:

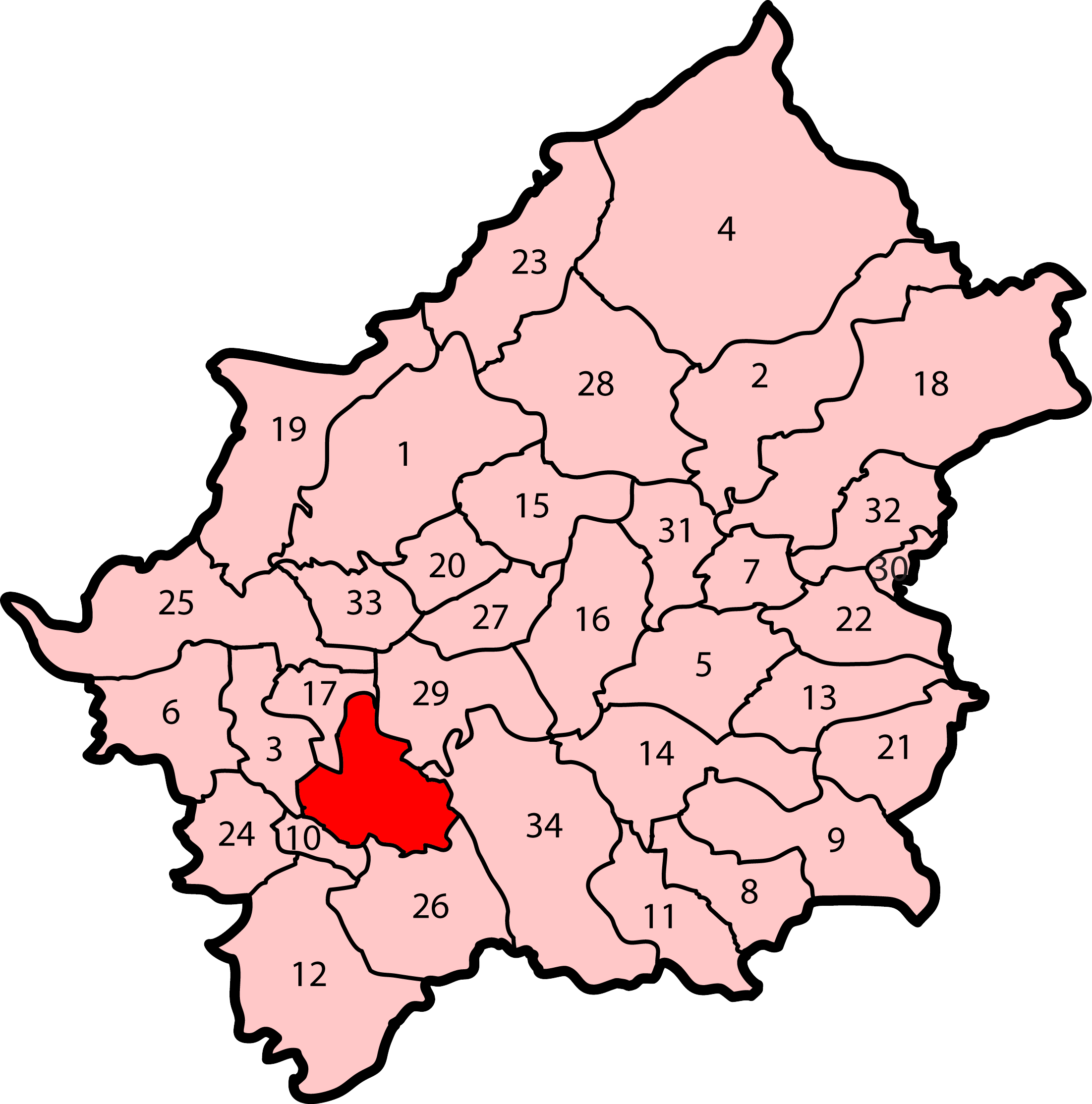
1. Arthuret; 2. Askerton; 3. Beaumont; 4. Bewcastle; 5. Brampton; 6. Burgh by Sands; 7. Burtholme; 8. Carlatton; 9. Cumrew; 10. Castle Carrock and Geltsdale; 11. Cummersdale; 12. Cumwhitton; 13. Dalston; 14. Farlam; 15. Hayton; 16. Hethersgill; 17. Irthington; 18. Kingmoor	18. Kingwater; 19. Kirkandrews-on-Esk; 20. Kirklinton Middle; 21. Midgeholme; 22. Nether Denton; 23. Nicholforest; 24. Orton; 25. Rockcliffe; 26. St Cuthbert Without; 27. Scaleby; 28. Solport and Stapleton; 29. Stanwix Rural; 30. Upper Denton; 31. Walton; 32. Waterhead; 33. Westlinton; 34. Wetheral
Unparished area of Carlisle

==== Coat of arms ====
The coat of arms of Carlisle City Council

The coat of arms of Carlisle City Council were those granted to the city council of the County Borough of Carlisle by the College of Arms on 7 July 1924. These arms were derived from more ancient designs of or relating to Carlisle and its governance.

The city council's coat of arms were emblematic of the city's history. The arms incorporated a golden shield with a red cross, upon a green mount, surmounted by a mural crown, relating to Carlisle's history as an ancient walled city. This was supported by two red wyverns—legendary dragons used in heraldry—their wings strewn with golden roses, with reference to the city's Brythonic history. The motto beneath the arms came from Thomas Wolsey's speech to Thomas Cromwell, in Shakespeare's play, Henry VIII: Be just and fear not.

== Geography ==
Places in the former City of Carlisle district

The City of Carlisle district was at the extreme north of North West England. It encompassed Cumbria's county town, Carlisle, and its surrounding rural hinterland, which together totalled 1,039.97 square kilometres (402 sq mi), making the district the largest in England by area. Although 70% of the district's 100,750 people lived in central Carlisle, 98% of the district's land use was rural. The district was traversed by several major rivers, including the Caldew, Eden, and Petteril, and was bisected by the M6, A74(M) motorways.

Along the City of Carlisle's northern extent was the Solway Firth, which forms the western section of the Anglo-Scottish border, and thus separated the district from Dumfries and Galloway, one of the council areas of Scotland. To the east was the English county of Northumberland; to the south was the former district of Eden and to the west and south-west the former borough of Allerdale, both in the county of Cumbria.

Much of the district spanned the flood plain of the River Eden resulting in large parts of the district being vulnerable to flooding. Two further tributaries, the Petteril and Caldew nearly surround the historic walled centre.

Carlisle experiences an oceanic climate (Köppen climate classification Cfb).

Climate data for Carlisle
Month	Jan	Feb	Mar	Apr	May	Jun	Jul	Aug	Sep	Oct	Nov	Dec	Year
Mean daily maximum °C (°F)	6.7 (44.1)	7.2 (45.0)	9.2 (48.6)	11.9 (53.4)	15.2 (59.4)	17.9 (64.2)	19.4 (66.9)	19.1 (66.4)	16.8 (62.2)	13.5 (56.3)	9.4 (48.9)	7.2 (45.0)	12.8 (55.0)
Mean daily minimum °C (°F)	1.6 (34.9)	1.5 (34.7)	2.9 (37.2)	4.4 (39.9)	6.8 (44.2)	9.7 (49.5)	11.7 (53.1)	11.5 (52.7)	9.5 (49.1)	6.8 (44.2)	3.9 (39.0)	1.4 (34.5)	6.0 (42.8)
Average precipitation mm (inches)	81.0 (3.19)	62.3 (2.45)	65.8 (2.59)	49.5 (1.95)	55.3 (2.18)	66.4 (2.61)	73.3 (2.89)	79.1 (3.11)	75.1 (2.96)	95.4 (3.76)	80.1 (3.15)	88.8 (3.50)	872.1 (34.33)

== Demography ==
Population pyramid of the City of Carlisle district in 2020

Carlisle compared
2001 UK Census	Carlisle	Cumbria	England
Total population	100,739	487,607	49,138,831
White	99.1%	99.3%	90.9%
Asian	0.3%	0.2%	4.6%
Black	0.1%	0.1%	2.3%

At the 2011 UK census, the City of Carlisle district had a total population of 107,524. 46.8% of the residents over the age of 16 were married or in a registered same-sex civil partnership, 11.9% were co-habiting couples, and 41.2% were not living in a couple.

In 1841, 15.7% of Carlisle's population was middle class compared to 14% in England and Wales; this increased to 18.9% in 1931 (15% nationally) and 35.7% in 2001 (48% nationally). Carlisle's proportion of working-class people increased slowly from 1841 to 1931, changing from 33.0% to 37.9 while the national average changed from 37% to 36% in the same period. Since 1931 it has fallen and risen again to 34.0% in 2001 (26% nationally). The rest of the population was made up of clerical workers and skilled manual workers.

=== Population change ===
The table below details the population change since 1801, including the percentage change since the last available census data. Although the City of Carlisle has existed as a district since 1974, figures have been generated by combining data from the towns, villages, and civil parishes that would later be constituent parts of the city.

Population growth in City of Carlisle since 1801

Year	Pop.	±%
1801	32,825	—
1811	37,176	+13.3%
1821	43,500	+17.0%
1831	49,571	+14.0%
1841	51,972	+4.8%
1851	57,378	+10.4%

Year	Pop.	±%
1861	61,857	+7.8%
1871	66,336	+7.2%
1881	70,816	+6.8%
1891	71,950	+1.6%
1901	74,989	+4.2%
1911	78,160	+4.2%

Year	Pop.	±%
1921	80,640	+3.2%
1931	83,200	+3.2%
1941	90,127	+8.3%
1951	97,667	+8.4%
1961	99,124	+1.5%
1971	100,607	+1.5%

Year	Pop.	±%
1981	99,507	−1.1%
1991	101,948	+2.5%
2001	100,798	−1.1%
2011	107,500	+6.6%

Source: 1801–2001: Vision of Britain, 2011: ONS

=== Religion ===
At the 2011 UK census, 69.1% of Carlisle's residents reported themselves as Christian, 22.9% had no religion and 6.8% did not state any religion. Other religions were represented with 0.4% of residents Muslim, 0.3% Buddhist, 0.2% Hindu and 0.3% had an alternative religion. The district was covered by the Roman Catholic Diocese of Lancaster, and the Church of England Diocese of Carlisle.

== Economy ==
Carlisle compared
2001 UK Census	City of Carlisle	Cumbria	England
Population of working age	73,431	354,183	35,532,091
Full-time employment	39.0%	36.9%	40.8%
Part-time employment	14.6%	13.6%	11.8%
Self employed	8.2%	9.9%	8.3%
Unemployed	3.5%	3.4%	3.3%
Retired	15.8%	16.7%	13.5%

At the United Kingdom Census 2001, Carlisle had 73,431 residents aged 16 to 74. Of these people, 2.4% were students with jobs, 3.1% students without jobs, 4.9% looking after home or family, 6.1% permanently sick or disabled and 2.3% economically inactive for other reasons.

In 2001, of 46,858 residents of the City of Carlisle district in employment, the industry of employment was 20.4% retail and wholesale, 15.9% manufacturing, 11.1% health and social work, 8.1% property and business services, 7.7% transport and communications, 7.3% construction, 6.4% education, 5.9% hotels and restaurants, 5.8% public administration and defence, 3.1% agriculture, 2.3% finance, 0.7% energy and water supply, 0.3% mining, and 4.5% other. This was roughly in line with national figures, although the proportion of jobs in agriculture which was more than the national average of 1.5% and the percentage of people working in finance was less than half the national average of 4.8%; the proportion of people working in property was also below the national average of 13.2%.

== Transport ==
=== Railway ===
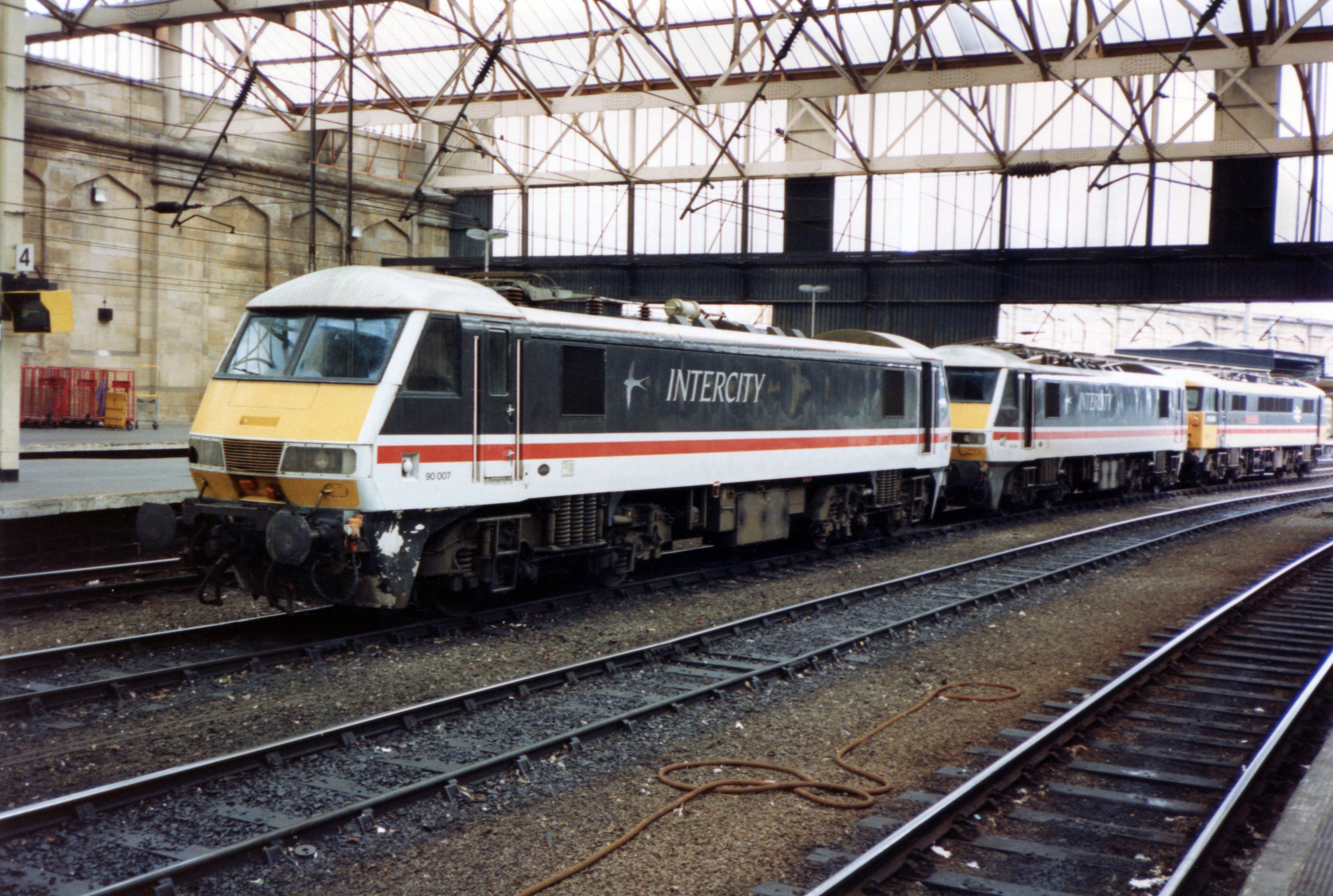
British Rail Class 90s in Carlisle Citadel station in the 1990s under British Rail.

Carlisle railway station is on the West Coast Main Line and serves the Settle and Carlisle Line, Tyne Valley Line, Cumbrian Coast Line and trains to South West Scotland.

=== Air ===
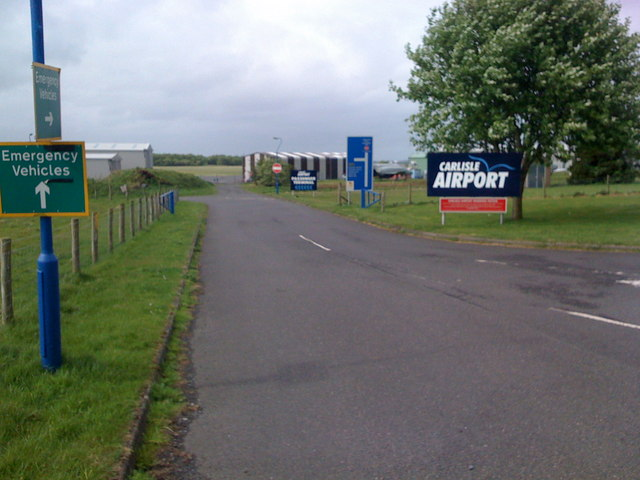
Carlisle Lake District Airport in 2009

The city has an airport, Carlisle Lake District Airport, owned by Ettyl. After a 25-year absence, commercial flights returned to the airport in July 2019 with a single airline, Loganair, providing services to London Southend, Belfast City and Dublin. In March 2020, however, the airline permanently suspended all flights from the airport due to the impact of the COVID-19 pandemic.

=== Buses ===
Carlisle bus station is operated by Stagecoach on Lonsdale Street in the city centre.

== Twin cities ==
Carlisle has formal twinning arrangements with two northern border cities on mainland Europe. They are Flensburg in northern Germany, since 1961, and Słupsk in northern Poland, since 1987. The three cities also have a separate triple agreement.

== Notable people ==
- List of people associated with Carlisle

== Freedom of the City ==
The following people and military units have received the Freedom of the City of Carlisle.

=== Individuals ===
- Prince Christian of Schleswig-Holstein: 7 July 1902.
- Diana, Princess of Wales: 29 January 1986.
- Ivor Broadis: 8 October 2018.

=== Military Units ===
- RAF Spadeadam: 2 June 2018.
