= Cumbria Fire and Rescue Service =

Fire and rescue service in England

Operational area
- Country: England
- County: Cumbria

Agency overview
- Established: 1974
- Chief Fire Officer: Ben Ryder

Facilities and equipment
- Divisions: 2
- Stations: 38
- Engines: 42
- Platforms: 2
- Rescues: 5
- HAZMAT: 2

Website
- www.cumbriafire.gov.uk

Cumbria Fire and Rescue Service is the statutory fire and rescue service for Cumberland and Westmorland and Furness in Cumbria, England. Since 2012, the headquarters for the service's 38 fire stations are at Penrith next to the headquarters of Cumbria Constabulary.

== History ==
Prior to 1947, there was the National Fire Service and before that there were various independent services run by volunteers in villages, towns and cities throughout the country. Cumbria Fire Service was formed in 1974 after local government was reorganised. It took in Cumberland Fire Service, Westmorland Fire Service, Carlisle and Barrow Fire Services and parts of Lancashire and Yorkshire. In 2005, the service changed its name to Cumbria Fire & Rescue service to reflect the new responsibilities it now has.

== Performance ==
Every fire and rescue service in England and Wales is periodically subjected to a statutory inspection by His Majesty's Inspectorate of Constabulary and Fire & Rescue Services (HMICFRS). The inspection investigates how well the service performs in each of three areas. On a scale of outstanding, good, requires improvement and inadequate, Cumbria Fire and Rescue Service was rated as follows:

HMICFRS Inspection Cumbria
Area	Rating 2018/2019	Rating 2021/2022	Description
Effectiveness	Good	Requires improvement	How effective is the fire and rescue service at keeping people safe and secure from fire and other risks?
Efficiency	Good	Inadequate	How efficient is the fire and rescue service at keeping people safe and secure from fire and other risks?
People	Requires improvement	Requires improvement	How well does the fire and rescue service look after its people?

== Fire stations ==
Of the 38 fire stations, there are six wholetime in Barrow-in-Furness, Carlisle East and West, Whitehaven, Workington and Kendal), of which three are supported by retained firefighters; two day-crewed (Ulverston and Penrith); and 30 retained.

The fire stations are split into two areas, reflecting the two unitary authority areas within Cumbria :

- Cumberland
- Westmorland and Furness

== Incidents of note ==
- 8 January 2005 – Carlisle and North Cumbria Floods, the worst flooding in living memory caused massive disruption and damage across the county. More than 3,000 properties were affected, 60,000 homes were without power and some areas of Carlisle were under 7 ft (2.1 m) of water.
- 5 November 2006 – Over 100 firefighters from across South Cumbria fought a major fire which eventually destroyed two of Barrow's largest superstores (MFI and Allied Carpets).
- 2 January 2008 – Dozens of firefighters fight a large blaze in Barrow's Matalan store, just next door to a construction site where MFI once stood.
- 11 January 2017 – Over 50 firefighters fight a large blaze in the old House of Lords building connected to Bar Continental in Barrow-in-Furness. The fire caused the building to at least partially collapse.

== See also ==
- Fire service in the United Kingdom
- Cumbria Constabulary
- List of British firefighters killed in the line of duty
