= Corby Viaduct =

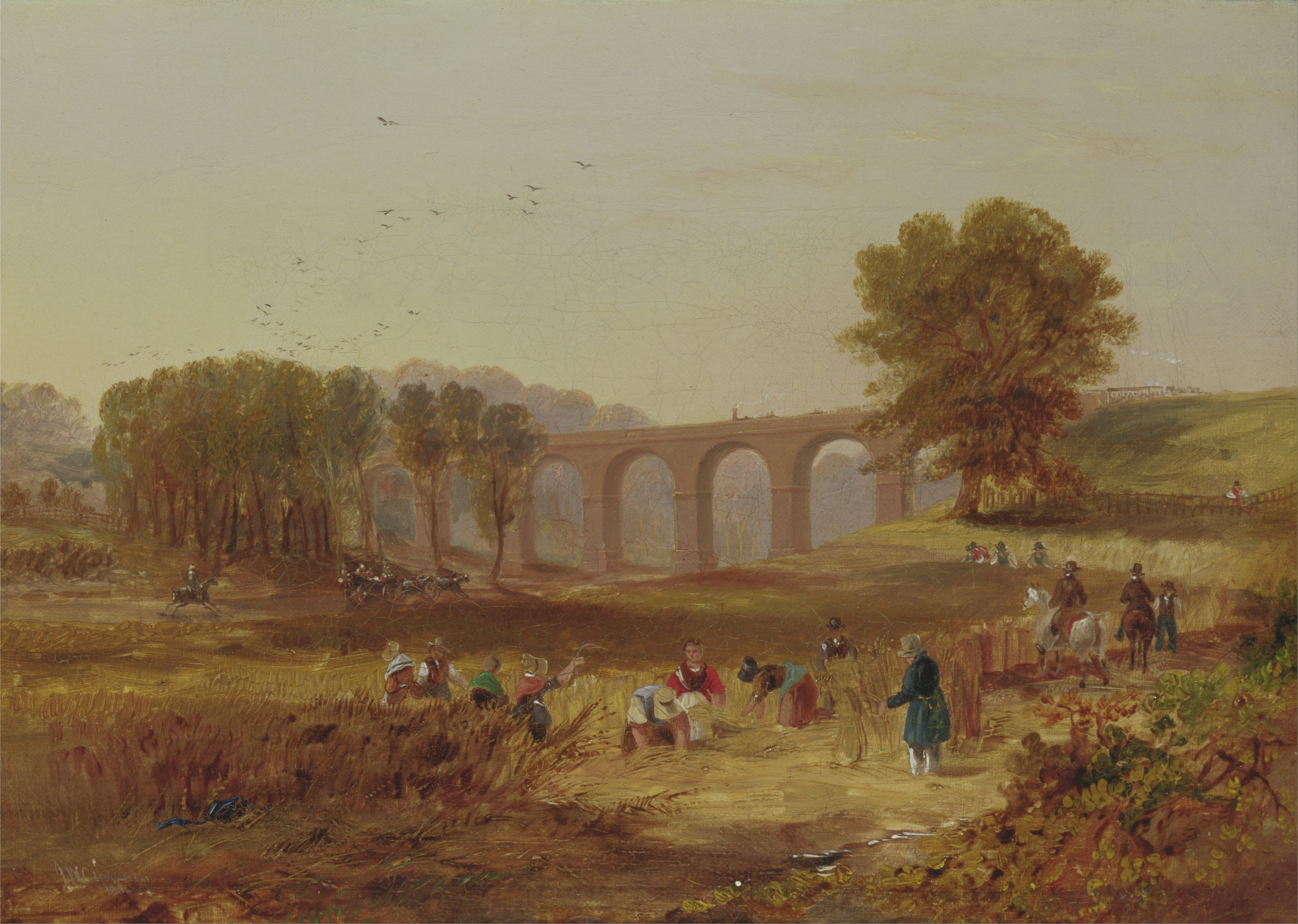
- Painting of the viaduct from 1836
- Coordinates: 54.885534°N 2.823778°W
- Carries: Tyne Valley line
- Crosses: Corby Beck
- Locale: Great Corby, Cumbria, England
- Maintained by: Network Rail
- Heritage status: Grade II listed building

Characteristics
- Material: Red sandstone
- Height: 23 metres (75 ft)
- No. of spans: 7

History
- Constructed by: Francis Giles
- Construction start: 1830
- Construction end: 1834

Corby Viaduct is a railway bridge built to carry the Newcastle and Carlisle Railway over the Corby Beck near Great Corby, in the parish of Wetheral, to the east of Carlisle in north-western England. One of the largest structures on the route, it is a grade II listed building.

== Background ==
The idea of linking Newcastle upon Tyne on England's east coast with Carlisle on the west dates back to at least the 1770s, when proposals were tabled for a canal. The prospectus for the Newcastle and Carlisle Railway was published in 1825 and construction work began in 1829 under the supervision of Francis Giles. The line was one of the earliest mainline railways and Britain's first major east-west line.

Giles was the consulting engineer for the entire line but was also directly responsible for the principal works at the western end, which presented some of the greatest engineering challenges on the route, including Corby Viaduct as well as the next feature on the line, the Corby Bridge (or Wetheral Viaduct, which crosses the River Eden), and the Gelt Bridge further east.

== Description ==
The viaduct crosses Corby Beck on seven red sandstone arches, supported by six piers. The arches have a span of 13 metres (43 feet) each and the whole structure is 160 metres (520 feet) long, carrying the railway 23 metres (75 feet) above the valley floor. The viaduct has similar architectural details to the nearby Corby Bridge (Wetheral Viaduct). It crosses the entrance drive to Corby Castle and was used as an entrance to the castle; the coat of arms of the Howard family are carved into the both faces of the central arch.

== History ==
The bridge was built from 1830 to 1834. The road to Corby Castle is now disused and much overgrown. Vegetation makes the viaduct largely inaccessible at ground level. The viaduct is a grade II listed building. The list entry describes it as "an early and important railway structure, forming an impressive landscape feature".

== See also ==
- Listed buildings in Wetheral
