= Our Lady and St Wilfrid's Church, Warwick Bridge =

Our Lady and St Wilfrid's Church
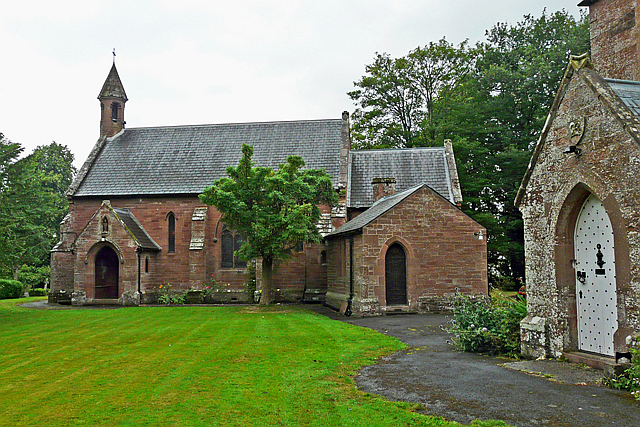
- Our Lady and St Wilfrid's Church
- 54.903257°N 2.81973°W
- OS grid reference: NY 47521 56817
- Location: Warwick Bridge, Cumbria
- Country: England
- Denomination: Roman Catholic

History
- Status: Parish church
- Dedication: St. Wilfrid
- Consecrated: 1841

Architecture
- Functional status: Active
- Heritage designation: Grade II*
- Designated: 1 April 1957
- Architect: Augustus Welby Northmore Pugin
- Style: Gothic Revival
- Completed: 1841
- Construction cost: £2,586

Administration
- Province: Liverpool
- Diocese: Lancaster
- Deanery: Cumbria
- Parish: Our Lady of Perpetual Help

Our Lady and St Wilfrid's Church is a Roman Catholic church designed by Augustus Welby Northmore Pugin, completed in 1841. The church was designed for the Sarum Rite, and contains an Easter Sepulchre.

== History ==
The church, designed by Augustus Pugin was built for a sum total of £2,586. The designs were originally commissioned by Henry Howard of nearby Corby Castle, and included plans for a presbytery and grounds.

The stained glass windows were presented by Philip Howard between 1860–1867 and contain images of St Thomas More and St Oliver Plunkett, amongst others. The glass was completed by John Hardman.

The church contains statues of Our Lady of Lourdes and the Sacred Heart of Jesus, as well as a mounted Infant of Prague. There is also a reliquary containing the relics of Saint Petronia which came to the parish from Cardinal Merry del Val via the Maxwell-Stuart family and the Benedictine nuns of Holme Eden Abbey.

== Parish ==
Previously served by the Benedictines of Ampleforth Abbey, the church was sistered with St Ninian's Chapel in Brampton. Together with Our Lady and St Joseph's in Carlisle and St Ninian's, the church forms part of the parish of Our Lady of Eden. This parish existed between 2014 and 2020. Our Lady of Eden then became part of the enlarged single Catholic parish of Our Lady of Perpetual Help for Carlisle and district. The parish is part of the Diocese of Lancaster.

Presently Mass is offered in the church on Thursday mornings at 10am and a vigil mass at 4pm on Saturdays fulfilling the Sunday obligation and 7pm on holy days. The rosary is also said on Thursday mornings at 9.30.

== Interior ==
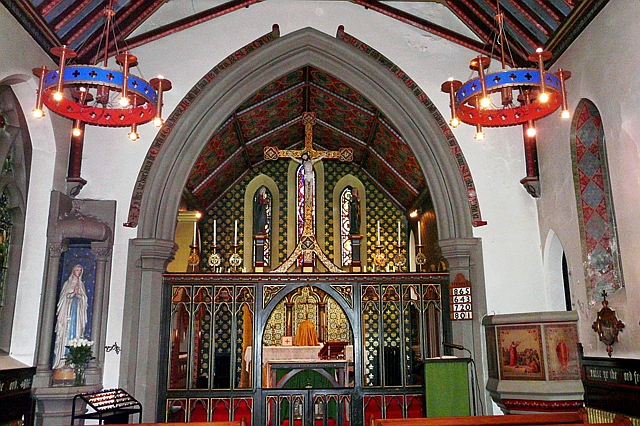
Nave

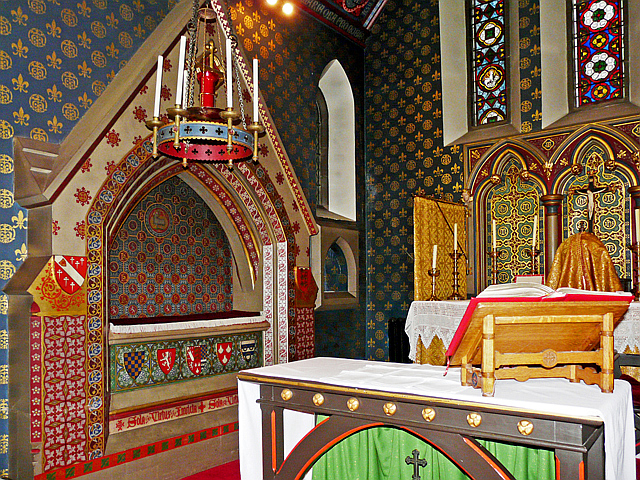
Chancel

== See also ==
- Augustus Welby Northmore Pugin
- Roman Catholic Diocese of Lancaster
