= 1836 in rail transport =

This article lists events related to rail transport that occurred in 1836.

== Events ==
=== January events ===
- January 16 – The Galena and Chicago Union Railroad, the oldest portion of what is to become the Chicago and North Western Railway, is chartered.

=== February events ===
- February 5 – Henry R. Campbell of the Philadelphia, Germantown & Norristown Railroad patents the first 4-4-0, a steam locomotive type that will soon become the most common on all railroads of the United States.
- February 8 - London and Greenwich Railway opens its first section, the first railway in London, England.

=== March events ===
- March - The Syracuse and Utica Railroad, a predecessor of the New York Central Railroad, is chartered to build a railroad between its namesake cities in New York.

=== April events ===
- April – The first railroad car ferry in the U.S., the Susquehanna enters service on the Susquehanna River between Havre de Grace and Perryville, Maryland.

=== May events ===
- May 5 – The Albany and West Stockbridge Railroad is chartered as the successor to the Castleton and West Stockbridge Railroad in Massachusetts and eastern New York.
- May 19 – The Bristol and Exeter Railway receives parliamentary authorization.

=== July events ===
- July 13 – John Ruggles is awarded U.S. patent 1 for his improvements to railroad steam locomotive tires.
- July 21 – The Champlain and St. Lawrence Railroad opens between St. John and La Prairie, Quebec, the first steam-worked passenger railroad in British North America.

=== August events ===
- August 1 – The Utica and Schenectady Railroad, a predecessor of the New York Central Railroad in New York, opens.
- August 8 – Andover and Wilmington Railroad opens its line to Andover, Massachusetts.

=== September events ===
- September 5 – The Lake Wimico and St. Joseph Canal and Railroad, the first steam railroad in Florida, opens.

=== October events ===
- The Louisa Railroad of Louisa County, Virginia, an early predecessor of the Chesapeake and Ohio Railway, begins construction.
- October 25 – Construction begins on the Wilmington and Raleigh Railroad in North Carolina. Due to a lack of support in Raleigh, the route is revised to run from Wilmington to the Petersburg Railroad in Weldon.

=== December events ===
- December 3 – Wetheral train accident: A passenger train on the Newcastle and Carlisle Railway in England is wrongly diverted into a siding at Wetheral railway station, derails and crushes three people to death.
- December 14 – The London and Greenwich Railway opens throughout from London Bridge to Deptford.

=== Unknown date events ===
- The Bangor and Piscataquis Canal and Railroad Company operates the first steam railroad in Maine with two 2-2-0 locomotives manufactured in England.

== Births ==
=== January births ===
- January 2 - Fred T. Perris, Chief Engineer of the California Southern Railroad (d. 1916).

=== February births ===
- February 9 – Franklin B. Gowen, president of the Philadelphia and Reading Railroad 1866–1883 (d. 1889).

=== March births ===
- March 16 – Andrew Smith Hallidie, who developed the first practical cable car system for San Francisco, California (d. 1900).

=== May births ===
- May 21 – Francis William Webb, Chief Mechanical Engineer of the London and North Western Railway (d. 1906).
- May 27 - Jay Gould, American financier who, with Jim Fisk, took control of the Erie Railroad (d. 1892).

=== September births ===
- September 17 - William Jackson Palmer, builder of the Denver and Rio Grande Western Railroad (d. 1909).

== Deaths ==
=== January deaths ===
- January 7 – John Molson, established the Champlain and Saint Lawrence Railroad, the first railway into Canada (b. 1763).
