= Broadwath =

Hamlet in Cumbria, England

Coordinates: 54.889°N 2.804°W

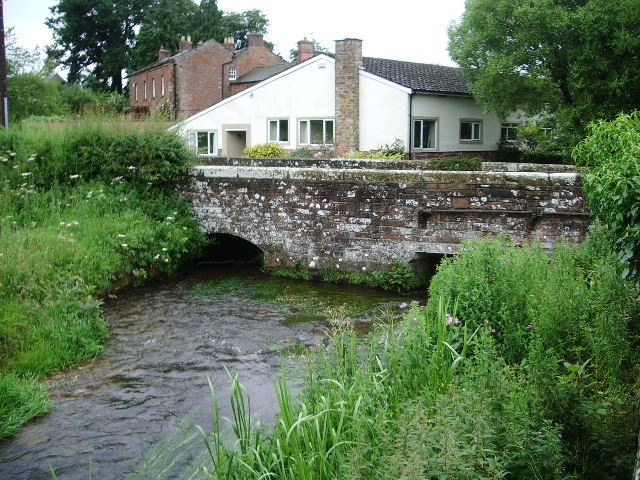
- Bridge over Cairn Beck, Broadwath

- Location in the former Carlisle district, Cumbria Location within Cumbria
- OS grid reference: NY484552
- Civil parish: Wetheral
- Unitary authority: Cumberland
- Ceremonial county: Cumbria
- Region: North West
- Country: England
- Sovereign state: United Kingdom
- Post town: CARLISLE
- Postcode district: CA8
- Dialling code: 01228
- Police: Cumbria
- Fire: Cumbria
- Ambulance: North West
- UK Parliament: Carlisle

Broadwath is a hamlet in the Cumberland district, in the English county of Cumbria. Broadwath is on Cairn Beck. Nearby settlements include the villages of Wetheral, Warwick Bridge, Great Corby and Heads Nook.

== See also ==
- Listed buildings in Wetheral
