= Henry Howard (historian) =

English antiquarian and family historian

Henry Howard FRS
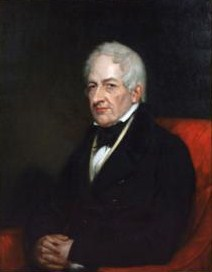
- Posthumous portrait of Howard, by James Ramsay, 1843

High Sheriff of Cumberland
- In office 1832–1833
- Preceded by: John Taylor
- Succeeded by: Henry Curwen

Personal details
- Born: 2 July 1757 Corby Castle, Cumberland
- Died: 1 March 1842 (aged 84) Corby Castle, Cumberland
- Spouse(s): Maria Archer (m. 1788; died 1789) Catherine Mary Neave (m. 1793)
- Relations: Sir Henry Howard (grandson); Francis Howard (grandson)
- Children: 6, including Philip, Henry
- Parent(s): Philip Howard; Anne Witham
- Education: University of Paris; Theresian Academy

Henry Howard FRS (2 July 1757 – 1 March 1842) was an English antiquarian and family historian, best known as the author of Memorials of the Howard Family. He was a member of the Howards of Corby, a branch of the Howard family headed by the Duke of Norfolk.

== Early life ==
Howard was born at Corby Castle in Cumberland on 2 July 1757, into the large and prominent Roman Catholic Howard family. Henry was the eldest son of Philip Howard (1730–1810) of Corby Castle, who wrote Scriptural History of the Earth and of Mankind, first published in London in 1797. His mother was Anne Witham, daughter of Henry Witham of Cliffe, Yorkshire. Among his sisters was Maria Howard, the second wife of Hon. George William Petre (son of Robert Petre, 9th Baron Petre). After his death in 1797, she married Col. Henry William Espinasse in 1802.

His paternal grandparents were Thomas Howard (d. 1740) and, his second wife, Barbara Musgrave, daughter of Philip Musgrave (son of Sir Christopher Musgrave, 4th Baronet) and Hon. Mary Legge (daughter of George Legge, 1st Baron Dartmouth). Before his grandparents married, his grandfather had been married to the Hon. Barbara Lowther (daughter of John Lowther, 1st Viscount Lonsdale). His great-grandfather, William Howard, was a son of Sir Francis Howard (the second son of Lord William Howard, himself the third son of Thomas Howard, 4th Duke of Norfolk).

Howard was educated at the college of the English Benedictines at Douay, and for a short time in 1774 studied at the University of Paris.

== Career ==
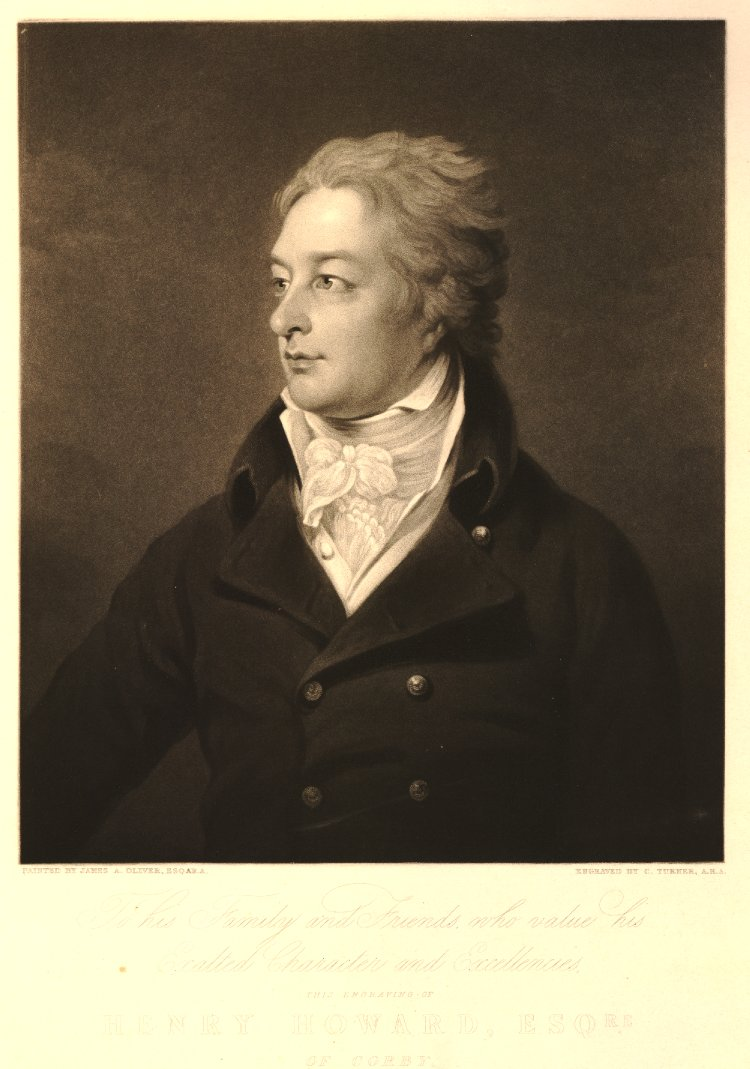
1839 engraving of Howard, by Charles Turner (after Archer James Oliver).

On 17 December 1774, Howard entered the Theresian Academy in Vienna, and there became a friend of Montecuccoli and Marsigli. He left Vienna in September 1777, but failed to obtain permission to serve in the English army. He then travelled for a time with his father and mother. At Strasburg the governor, M. de la Salle, and General Wurmser showed him favour, and during the two or three years that he passed in study there, living with his father and mother, he often visited Cardinal Rohan. General Wurmser tried to induce him to accept a commission in the Austrian service, but he refused, still hoping that he might obtain an English commission. In 1782, however, he went with Prince Christian of Hesse-Darmstadt to the camp before Prague. In 1784 a final attempt on the part of the Earl of Surrey to get him admitted into the German detachment of the Duke of York's forces failed; and the following year he returned to Great Corby.

Howard spent the rest of his life as a country gentleman and antiquary. In politics he was a Whig; he signed the petition in favour of parliamentary reform, and advocated the repeal of the Penal Laws against Catholics. When in 1795 it became possible, Howard was made captain in the 1st York Militia, with which he served for a time in Ireland. In 1802 he raised the Edenside rangers, and in 1803 the Cumberland rangers: for this regiment he wrote a short work on the drill of light infantry (1805). In later life he was a friend and correspondent of Louis-Philippe. He was a Fellow of the Society of Antiquaries of London, and in 1832 high sheriff of Cumberland.

=== Works ===
Howard's major works were:

- Remarks on the Erroneous Opinions entertained respecting the Catholic Religion, Carlisle, 1825; other later editions.
- Indications of Memorials ... of Persons of the Howard Family, 1834, privately printed.

He also contributed to Archæologia, and assisted John Lingard, Agnes Strickland and others (Cuthbert Sharp, Mark Aloysius Tierney, Patrick Fraser Tytler) in historical work. With Charles Butler he helped Charles James Fox in tracking the papers of James II, as far as the Scotch College in Paris.

== Personal life ==
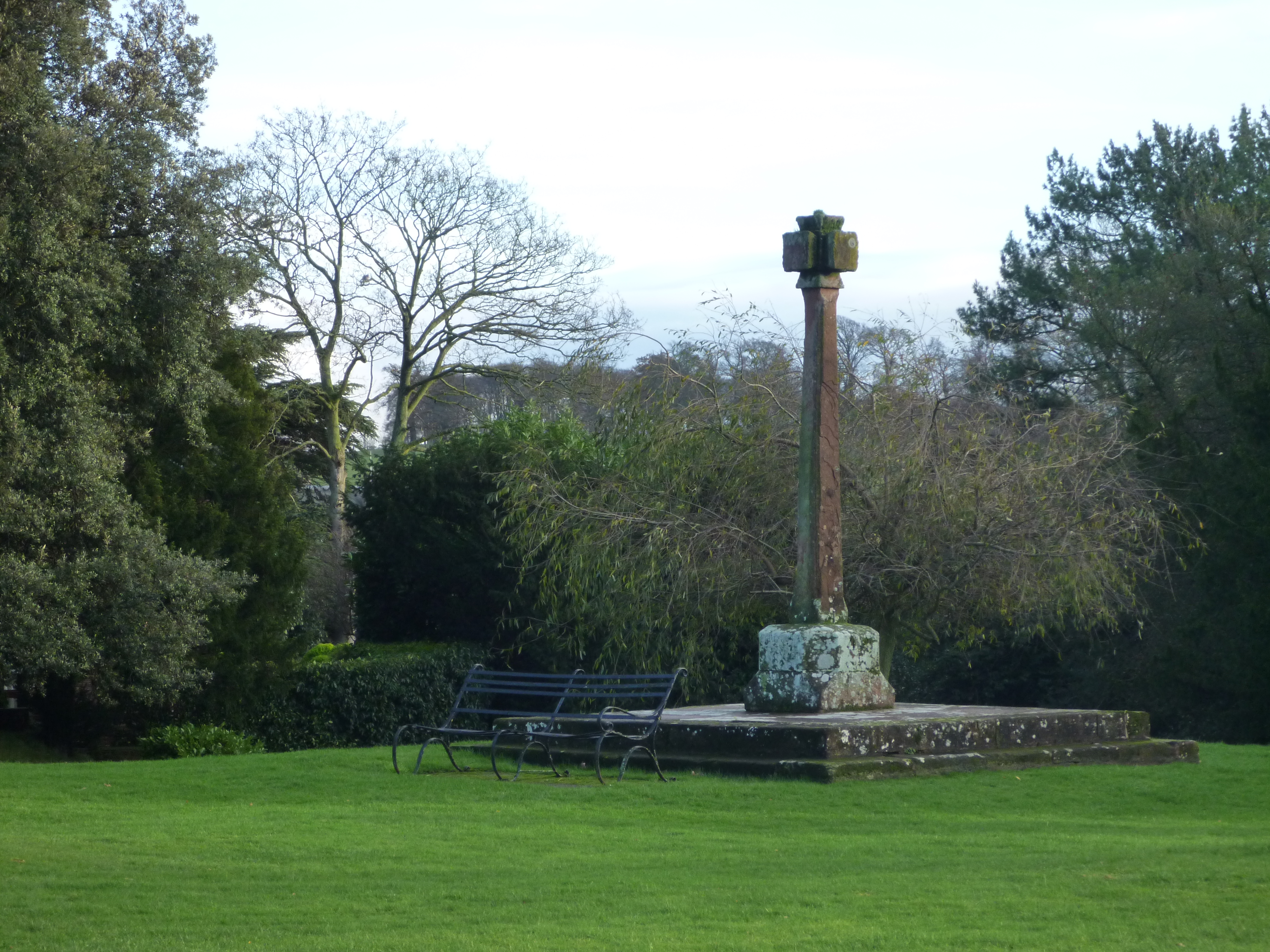
Cross on the village green at Wetheral, originating in a maypole set up in 1814 by Henry Howard

On 4 November 1788, Howard married Maria Archer (d. 1789), third daughter of Andrew Archer, 2nd Baron Archer and the former Sarah West. She died in 1789, leaving one daughter; the monument by Nollekens erected to her memory in Wetheral Church, Cumberland, is the subject of two of William Wordsworth's sonnets.

Howard's second wife, whom he married 18 March 1793, was Catherine Mary Neave (d. 1849), second daughter of Sir Richard Neave, 1st Baronet of Dagnam Park in Essex and the former Frances Bristow. Catherine kept journals, and printed privately four volumes at Carlisle for her children from 1836 to 1838, entitled Reminiscences. Together, they were the parents of two sons and three daughters, including:

- Philip Henry Howard (1801–1883), who became a Member of Parliament for Carlisle who married Elizabeth Canning, daughter of Maj. John Canning.
- Catherine Howard (c. 1802–1861), who married the Hon. Philip Stourton, the youngest son of William Stourton, 16th Baron Stourton.
- Emma Agnes Howard (1803–1861), who married, as his second wife, William Petre, 11th Baron Petre.
- Henry Francis Howard (1809–1898), a diplomat who married the Hon. Sevilla Erskine, daughter of David Erskine, 2nd Baron Erskine. After her death in 1835, he married Marie Ernestine von der Schulenburg in 1841.
- Adeliza Maria Howard (1805–1833), who married Henry William Petre, a son of Hon. George William Petre (and grandson of Robert Petre, 9th Baron Petre).

Howard died at Corby Castle on 1 March 1842.

=== Descendants ===
Through his second son Henry, he was a grandfather of Sir Henry Howard, who also became a diplomat, and Francis Howard, who became a general in the British army.
