= Listed buildings in Wetheral =

Wetheral is a civil parish in the Cumberland district of Cumbria, England. It contains 104 buildings that are recorded in the National Heritage List for England. Of these, eleven are listed at Grade I, the highest of the three grades, five are at Grade II*, the middle grade, and the others are at Grade II, the lowest grade. The parish is to the east of the city of Carlisle, and it contains the villages of Wetheral, Great Corby, Cumwhinton, Scotby, Warwick-on-Eden, Warwick Bridge, Broadwath, Cotehill, and Aglionby, and the surrounding countryside.

Wetheral Priory was in the parish, but all that remains of it is its gatehouse and a length of wall; both are listed buildings and scheduled monuments. Another important building in the parish is Corby Castle, initially a tower house and later expanded; this and associated structures are listed. Most of the other listed buildings are country houses and smaller houses with associated structures, farmhouses and farm buildings. In addition, the listed buildings include churches and associated structures, medieval cave dwellings, former water mills, public houses, a milestone, bridges and viaducts, railway stations and associated buildings, war memorials, and a school.

== Key ==
Grade	Criteria
I	Buildings of exceptional interest, sometimes considered to be internationally important
II*	Particularly important buildings of more than special interest
II	Buildings of national importance and special interest

== Buildings ==
Name and location	Photograph	Date	Notes	Grade
St Constantine's Cells; 54.87381°N 2.83219°W		Early medieval	Three cave dwellings used in the 14th century by the Priory of Wetheral, in the cliff face above the River Eden. They have been cut out of the rock, and measure 20 feet (6.1 m) by 9 feet (2.7 m) by 9 feet (2.7 m). The cells have a front wall in masonry, with three windows, and inside are a fireplace. The cells are also a scheduled monument.	I
Salmon coops 54.87495°N 2.82991°W	—	12th century	The structure was built to provide salmon for Wetheral Priory. It is in sandstone, and consists of three splayed piers and two abutments built into the bed and the bank of River Eden, over which is a catwalk. Between the piers and abutments are pans and sluices to catch the salmon. On the bank is a wooden crane.	II
St Leonard's Church; 54.90307°N 2.83424°W		12th century	Alterations and additions were made in 1869 and in 1908. The church is in sandstone and has a slate roof with decorative ridge tiles and coped gables. It consists of a nave with a west porch, and a chancel with a semicircular apse and a north vestry. On the west gable is a corbelled bellcote, and the windows are lancets. Around the apse is blind arcading. Inside the church is the former Norman tower arch.	II*
Church of the Holy Trinity and St Constantine; 54.88149°N 2.83056°W		13th century	The church has since been altered and extended, including the addition of a tower in 1790, and a restoration in 1882. It is built in sandstone, and has slate roofs with a coped east gable. The church consists of a nave with a clerestory, a vestry, and a south porch, a chancel with a north chapel, and a west tower. At the east end of the nave is a bellcote. The tower is hexagonal, and has a half-octagonal stair tower and a battlemented parapet.	II*
Corby Castle; 54.87969°N 2.82603°W		13th century	A country house that originated as a tower house. A wing was added in the 17th century, giving it an L-shaped plan, and the angle was filled in with a Neoclassical building between 1812 and 1817. The house is in sandstone with a slate roof and has three storeys. The south front has five bays and contains a tetrastyle Greek Doric porch flanked by an arcaded loggia. Above this is a three-light window with pilasters, and in the top floor is a Diocletian window. The west front has seven bays, and contains an open Greek Doric loggia. On both fronts is a cornice surmounted by a heraldic lion.	I
Wetheral Priory Gatehouse; 54.87900°N 2.83053°W		14th century	The gatehouse was provided for the Benedictine priory. It is in sandstone on a chamfered plinth, with moulded dressings and a stone-slate roof. There are three storeys and two bays. Each storey has a string course, and there is a battlemented parapet. The gateway contains a large round-headed moulded arch, a barrel vaulted passage, mullioned windows, and hood moulds. There is an internal spiral staircase. The gate is also a scheduled monument.	I
Walls of east range of Wetheral Priory; 54.87969°N 2.82930°W	—	14th century	The wall is the only remaining part of the priory above the ground, possibly the east wall of the chapter house. It is in sandstone on a chamfered plinth, and has moulded dressings. The wall is about 25 metres (82 ft) long, possibly originally of two storeys, now up to the top of the ground floor windows. It contains two lancet windows and a two-light mullioned window. The wall is also a scheduled monument.	I
Cote House; 54.86384°N 2.81857°W	—	Late 16th or early 17th century	Originally a bastle house, later extended and used as a farmhouse. It is built with thick walls in large blocks of sandstone, rendered at the front, and with a green slate roof. There are two storeys and four bays, with a single-storey extension to the west. Some of the original windows have been filled in, and the current windows and doors date from the 20th century.	II
Folly, Whooff House; 54.89896°N 2.86687°W	—	1610 (or 1650–75)	The structure consists of the former east window of Arthuret Church, erected in the grounds of the house in 1868. It has a brick base, sandstone buttresses, and a freestone surround and tracery. There are six lights with segmental arches, a central mullion, intersecting tracery, and an oval at the apex.	II
Howard Tomb; 54.88157°N 2.83022°W	—	1642	The tomb is in the churchyard of Wetheral Church. It is a chest tomb on a sandstone plinth with a shaped slab of yellow sandstone inscribed with the names of members of the Howard family of Corby Castle.	II
Byre Hill Farmhouse; 54.87653°N 2.82431°W	—	Mid 17th century	Originating as estate cottages for Corby Castle, and incorporating earlier material, they were later converted into a farmhouse with barns and hay lofts to the right. The building has thick sandstone walls, a slate roof, and two storeys. The original windows were small, mullioned, and with chamfered surrounds, and these have been filled and replaced with 19th-century windows and doors.	II
Chapel Farmhouse; 54.84537°N 2.82936°W	—	Late 17th century	The west wall, facing the road, is in sandstone, and the east wall is a mixture of clay, sandstone and straw, on sandstone footings, and the roof is slated. The house has 1 1/2 storeys and four bays. The west wall contains blocked mullioned windows and 20th-century attic windows, and east wall has a 20th-century doorway and windows.	II
Green Farmhouse, Scotby; 54.88744°N 2.87229°W	—	Late 17th century	The farmhouse, later a private house, is in sandstone with quoins and a brick coped gable on the left. There are two storeys and four bays. The doorway has squared pilasters, a moulded cornice, and a fanlight. The original windows are mullioned casements with moulded surrounds, and some have been replaced by 18th-century sashes.	II
Dovecote; 54.87718°N 2.82474°W	—	17th or 18th century	The dovecote is in the grounds of Corby Castle, and is probably a rebuild of an earlier dovecote. It is in sandstone, it has a portico at the front and a square dovecote behind. The portico has a short flight of steps, four Ionic columns, an inscribed frieze, a balustraded balcony, and a pediment surmounted by a carved lion. There are niches at the back of the portico. The entrance to the dovecote is at the rear, and inside is a rotating ladder.	I
Clematis Cottage; 54.88127°N 2.82406°W	—	Late 17th or early 18th century	A sandstone cottage that possibly originated as two cottages, it has a slate roof, and is in a single storey with two bays. The cottages has a plank door, a filled entrance, and horizontally sliding sash windows.	II
Sunny Nook; 54.88116°N 2.82395°W	—	Late 17th or early 18th century	A sandstone cottage with 1 1/2 storeys, two bays, and an extension to the left. The ground floor windows are horizontally sliding sashes, and above are gabled dormers.	II
Cascade; 54.87890°N 2.82614°W		Between 1708 and 1729	The cascade and summer house are in the grounds of Corby Castle, and are in sandstone. The summer house is in Venetian style, and has a portico with niches containing statues, and more statues inside. In the centre of the portico is a water spout consisting of a dragon's head flanked by three-headed animals. The water falls over arched steps, one with a grotto behind, about 10 metres (33 ft) to a semicircular basin, in the centre of which is a statue of Nelson, and then by more steps into the river.	I
Friends Meeting House; 54.88717°N 2.87185°W	—	1710	The Friends' meeting house closed in 1913. It is in brick on a sandstone plinth, with sandstone dressings and a stone-slate roof. The building has one storey and three bays. The doorway and windows have plain surrounds.	II
Orchard House, Scotby; 54.87904°N 2.87138°W	—	1710	Originally a farmhouse, later a private house, it is rendered and has a slate roof. There are two storeys and five bays. Above the original entrance is a dated and initialled lintel. There is a small fire window with a chamfered and moulded surround; the other windows are sashes with plain surrounds.	II
Statue of Polyphemus; 54.87818°N 2.82659°W	—	c. 1720	The statue of the Greek mythological character Polyphemus is in the grounds of Corby Castle. It is in sandstone, about 4 metres (13 ft) high, and depicts the figure holding a staff in one hand and reed-pipes in the other.	II
Tempietto; 54.87399°N 2.83026°W	—	c. 1720	A folly in the grounds of Corby Castle in the form of a Tuscan temple. It is in stuccoed stone with a slate roof. Steps with piers surmounted by carved balls lead up to a portico with four Tuscan columns and a moulded entablature. The pediment contains carved figures. The entrance has a moulded surround, an entablature and a dentilled pediment. Inside the building is a single room with painted walls.	I
Eden Brow Park Cottage; 54.83375°N 2.77928°W	—	Early 18th century	The cottage has been extensively altered. It is in sandstone with a stone-slate roof, in two storeys and three bays. On the front is a gabled porch, and the windows are 20th-century casements.	II
Greystones; 54.88075°N 2.83401°W	—	Early 18th century	The house was altered and extended in the 19th century. It is roughcast with stone dressings, and has a slate roof with a coped gable on the right. There are two storeys and two bays, with a single-bay extension to the left. On the front is a porch, and the doorway and sash windows have plain surrounds.	II
Hawthorn Cottage; 54.88140°N 2.82366°W	—	Early 18th century	A sandstone cottage with a tiled roof, in a single storey and with four bays. On the front is a projecting porch with a pointed arch, casement windows in plain surrounds, and a 20th-century bow window.	II
Howard Cottage; 54.90340°N 2.82101°W	—	Early 18th century	This probably originated as an estate cottage, it was used as a Roman Catholic church in the early 19th century, and was converted back to a house in about 1842. The cottage is roughcast and has an asbestos sheet roof with coped gables. It has one storey and five bays. The doorway has an alternate block surround, and the windows have plain surrounds. The windows in the east gable end have hood moulds, over which is a coat of arms, and the bargeboards are decorated and inscribed.	II
Ivy House; 54.88383°N 2.87013°W	—	Early 18th century	A brick house on a sandstone plinth with a slate roof, two storeys, and four bays. The doorway has a moulded surround, a plain entablature and a moulded cornice. The windows are sashes with flat brick arches and keystones.	II
Wheelbarrow Hall; 54.89791°N 2.87714°W	—	Early 18th century	A brick farmhouse with stone dressings, a string course, a moulded cornice, and a slate roof with coped gables. There are two storeys and five bays. The doorway has a moulded surround, a dentilled pediment, and ornamental console brackets. The windows are sashes with flat arches.	II
Froddle Crook; 54.83365°N 2.77951°W	—	1746	A sandstone cottage with a stone-slate roof. There are two storeys and two bays, with a recessed single bay extension to the left. There are two doorways with plain surrounds, one with a dated lintel. The windows are 20th-century casements.	II
The Shrubbery; 54.88077°N 2.82487°W	—	1750	Originally a farmhouse with an attached barn, in sandstone with slate roofs. There are three bays, a doorway with a chamfered surround and an initialled and dated lintel, and horizontally sliding sash windows. There are external wooden steps to a first floor door.	II
Birkhill Farmhouse and farm buildings 54.87805°N 2.81560°W	—	Mid 18th century	The farmhouse is in brick with sandstone dressings, chamfered quoins, a plain cornice, and a Welsh slate roof. It has two storeys, a symmetrical five-bay front, and a lean-to on the right. The central doorway has a moulded surround and a pulvinated frieze, and the windows, most of which are sashes, have plain surrounds. Above the rear door is an inscribed plaque. The farm buildings are in brick and sandstone with green slate roofs and, with the house, form three sides of the farmyard; these include a stable range, a threshing barn, and a granary.	II
Sundial; 54.88119°N 2.83024°W	—	1751	The sundial is in the churchyard of the Church of the Holy Trinity and St Constantine. It is in sandstone, and consists of a polygonal column on a carved stepped medieval cross socket. On the top is a brass dial inscribed with Roman numerals.	II
Edenside Cottage and The Cottage; 54.88270°N 2.83024°W	—	Late 18th century	A pair of houses, originally with one storey, and a second storey added in the 19th century. They are rendered with sandstone in the ground floor and brick above, and with a slate roof. Each house has two bays, and a gabled dormer with bargeboards in the outer bays. The doorway and sash windows have plain surrounds.	II
Green Farm, Wetheral; 54.88092°N 2.83337°W	—	Late 18th century	Originally a farmhouse, later a private house, it is rendered with angle pilaster strips and a slate roof. There are two storeys and three bays, and lower two-storey one-bay wings on each side. The door has a round-arched head with a keystone, and a fanlight. The windows are sashes with plain surrounds, and in the left wing are garage doors.	II
Moorhouse Hall; 54.89728°N 2.84083°W	—	Late 18th century	Additions were made to the house in the 19th century. It is roughcast with stone dressings and a slate roof. There are two storeys and four bays, and with a two-storey three-bay extension to the right. The doorway has moulded pilasters, and a moulded and ornamented entablature and pediment, and the windows are sashes.	II
Gate piers, railings and wall, Moorhouse Hall; 54.89788°N 2.84119°W	—	Late 18th century	The gate piers and walls are in sandstone. The shafts of the piers consist of alternate large and small blocks, and on them is a moulded cornice surmounted by moulded balls. The walls have plain coping and 19th-century iron railings.	II
Orchard House, Great Corby; 54.88214°N 2.82288°W	—	Late 18th century	The house is in sandstone with a slate roof, two storeys and three bays. The doorway and the windows, which are sashes, have plain surrounds.	II
Warwick Green; 54.90133°N 2.83631°W	—	Late 18th century	A roughcast house with stone quoins, and a slate roof with coped gables. There are two storeys and three bays. The doorway has a quoined surround, a keyed square-headed arch, and a lattice porch. The windows are sashes with cornices and moulded surrounds.	II
Yew Tree House; 54.88398°N 2.81999°W	—	Late 18th century	A sandstone house with a slate roof, two storeys, and two bays. The porch has two Doric columns and a pediment, and the sash windows have plain surrounds.	II
Holme House; 54.86618°N 2.86018°W	—	1778	A sandstone farmhouse on a chamfered plinth, with quoins, string courses, a moulded cornice, a parapet, and a slate roof with coped gables. There are two storeys and five bays. The entrance has a moulded, ornamented and dentilled surround, and a dated pediment. The windows are sashes with plain surrounds.	II
The Mill; 54.90195°N 2.81519°W		1790	Originally a cotton water mill, it was gutted by fire in 1793, and rebuilt. It is in sandstone and has a slate roof. The original part has three storeys with an attic and nine bays. In 1814 a further block was added, in four storeys with an attic and eleven bays, and it was changed to steam power in 1822. The mill ceased production in the 1970s and has since been converted to separate units. At the west end of the original building is a wooden bellcote with a weathervane.	II
Crown Hotel; 54.88313°N 2.83197°W		c. 1800	Originally two houses, it became an inn in about 1838, and was altered, including the addition of a storey, in about 1930 by Harry Redfern. The hotel is rendered with moulded stone dressings, quoins, and a slate roof. There are three storeys and seven bays, with a moulded cornice between the middle and the top floor, and another above the top floor. The entrance has two Roman Ionic columns and a dentilled entablature. The windows are sashes with moulded surrounds.	II
Low House; 54.82565°N 2.75727°W	—	1800–11	The house was extended in the middle of the 19th century. It is in rendered sandstone on a chamfered plinth, and has quoins and slate roofs. There are two storeys, the original part has five bays and coped gables, and the later wings each has one bay and a hipped roof. The porch has Corinthian columns with a moulded and ornamented entablature, and the sash windows have plain surrounds.	II
Kitchen garden walls, Corby Castle; 54.88042°N 2.82608°W	—	1812–17	The walls of the kitchen garden are in brick, and incorporate decorative arches. In the west wall is a sandstone entrance flanked by round-headed stuccoed niches with voussoirs and keystones. Above them is a cornice surmounted by a large re-sited carved coat of arms.	I
Orchard Lodge; 54.88210°N 2.82200°W	—	1812–17 (probable)	A house, originally a lodge to Corby Castle, in sandstone with a slate roof. It has a porch with a segmental plan, Tuscan columns, and a moulded and dentilled cornice that is carried round the rest of the building. There is an L-shaped extension to the right containing a small sash window.	II
Wetheral Cross; 54.88122°N 2.83291°W		1814	The oldest parts are the steps, the rest of the cross dating from about 1844. The structure originated as a maypole on a different site. It is in sandstone and 3.5 metres (11 ft) high. There are two square steps, a chamfered plinth with a socket, and a square chamfered tapering shaft with a head carved to form a cross.	II
1–6 High Buildings; 54.90239°N 2.81478°W	—	1814–16	A row of six houses, originally twelve back-to-back houses. They are in sandstone with surrounds of stuccoed brick and a hipped slate roof. There are two storeys, and each house has two bays. The doors and casement windows are 20th-century replacements. No. 1 has a cellar with steps leading down to it.	II
8–12 High Buildings; 54.90231°N 2.81444°W	—	1814–16	A terrace of five houses, originally workers' cottages, in sandstone with quoins and slate roofs. They have two storeys, and each house has two bays, other than No. 12, which has three bays and a cellar. The doorways and windows have plain surrounds, and between Nos. 11 and 12 is a round-headed cart entrance. Steps lead up to the door of No. 12, which has sash windows. The windows of the other houses are 19th-century casements.	II
East Lodge, Corby Castle; 54.88042°N 2.82307°W	—	1817–18	The lodge is in sandstone with a slate roof, and has two storeys and three bays. In front is a portico with four Tuscan columns, and a dentilled pediment. In the pediment is a circular panel carved with a depiction of Apollo and his chariot. The central doorway has a round arch and a patterned fanlight, and the windows are sashes with plain surrounds.	I
Acorn Bank; 54.88292°N 2.83596°W	—	Early 19th century	A sandstone house with a slate roof, in two storeys and four bays. The left three bays are stuccoed and have a porch with a tented lead hood, and to the right is a bay window, also with a tented hood. The right bay projects, it is taller with a segmental plan, and it contains curved windows. All the windows are sashes in plain surrounds.	II
Cairn House; 54.90331°N 2.81900°W	—	Early 19th century	A sandstone house with quoins, and a tile roof with skylights. There are two storeys and three bays. The doorway has a reeded pilaster surround, a prostyle porch with Corinthian columns, a plain entablature, a dentilled cornice. a blocking course and a fanlight. The windows are sashes with plain surrounds.	II
Cringles; 54.86694°N 2.86649°W	—	Early 19th century	A sandstone farmhouse on a chamfered plinth, with quoins and a slate roof. There are two storeys and three bays. The doorway is flanked by engaged Tuscan columns, and has a moulded entablature and cornice, and a fanlight. The sash windows have moulded surrounds.	II
The Grange; 54.88235°N 2.83275°W	—	Early 19th century	A stuccoed house with corner pilasters and a slate roof. There are two storeys and three bays, and a two-storey one-bay extension on the left. The doorway has a moulded architrave, it is flanked by canted bay windows, and the other windows are sashes.	II
Myrtle Cottage and Holly Cottage; 54.88147°N 2.82344°W	—	Early 19th century	A pair of rendered houses with stone dressings and a slate roof, both in two storeys. Myrtle Cottage has three bays, a round-headed doorway with a moulded surround, a false keystone, and a radial fanlight. Holly Cottage has one bay, and an entrance with a plain surround. Both cottages have sash windows.	II
Oak House; 54.88383°N 2.81928°W	—	Early 19th century	A sandstone house with quoins, a string course, a moulded and dentilled cornice, and a hipped slate roof. There are two storeys and three bays. The doorway and sash windows have plain surrounds, and above the door is a moulded cornice on decorative console brackets.	II
The Plain, The Old Rectory and The Plains; 54.88639°N 2.83716°W	—	Early 19th century	A terrace of three stuccoed houses with stone dressings and a slate roof. There are two storeys, and each house has three bays. In the centre of each house is a doorway flanked by Greek Doric columns, above the doors are fanlights, and the windows are sashes with plain surrounds.	II
Queens Inn; 54.89872°N 2.83774°W		Early 19th century	A public house in sandstone with quoins and a slate roof. There are two storeys and three bays. The doorway and sash windows have plain surrounds, and above the door is a cornice on console brackets. To the left and projecting forward is a two-storey two-bay extension with similar features, and it is joined to the main part by a 20th-century glazed porch.	II
Red Beeches and wall 54.88434°N 2.87165°W	—	Early 19th century	A house in rendered brick, with quoins, a cornice, and a slate roof. There are two storeys and three bays. The doorway has engaged Ionic columns, a moulded and dentilled entablature, and a fanlight. The windows are sashes with moulded stone surrounds. To the right is a brick castellated wall.	II
River House; 54.88303°N 2.83038°W	—	Early 19th century	The house is stuccoed, with rusticated quoins and a slate roof. There are two storeys and two bays, and a two-bay extension to the right. The doorway and the windows, which are sashes, have plain surrounds, and in the extension are garage doors.	II
Wellholme; 54.88588°N 2.87256°W	—	Early 19th century	A stuccoed house with quoins, a moulded cornice, and a hipped slate roof. There are two storeys and three bays. The doorway has two engaged Ionic columns, and a moulded and dentilled entablature. It is flanked by canted bay windows, and the other windows are sashes.	II
Whitegate; 54.88923°N 2.80467°W	—	Early 19th century	A sandstone house with quoins, a moulded cornice carried round to form pedimented gables, and a green slate roof with coped gables. There are two storeys, four bays, and a double depth plan. The porch has squared pilasters, a moulded cornice with ornamental console brackets, and the door has a fanlight and side lights. The sash windows have plain surrounds.	II
The Old Chapel; 54.90171°N 2.83513°W		Before 1828	Originally a Sunday School, it was a Methodist chapel by 1847, and later used as a workshop. The building is in sandstone with brick-arched windows, angle pilasters, and a slate roof. There are two storeys and the central part is flanked by single-storey two-bay cottages. The entrance front is pedimented, the doorway has a moulded surround, and a cornice on ornamental console brackets, and above it is an oculus. The cottages have pedimented gables and sash windows.	II
Stable Block, Warwick Hall; 54.90493°N 2.83498°W	—	1828	The stables have since been used for other purposes. They are in sandstone with a slate roof, and have two storeys and ten bays. In the centre is a large round-headed entrance arch, above which is a circular opening and a pedimented gable. The outer bays are gabled and project forward, they contain round-headed arches and in the upper floor are string courses and quoins. The windows are sashes with plain surrounds.	II
Milestone; 54.90090°N 2.83662°W	—	1830	The milestone was provided for the Carlisle to Brampton turnpike. It is in sandstone, and consists of a squared stone with a pyramidal top set at an angle to the road. On each face is a cast iron plate inscribed with the distances in miles to Carlisle and to Brampton. On the top of the milestone is a bench mark and a metal stud.	II
Corby Bridge; 54.88386°N 2.82965°W		1830–34	Also known as the Wetheral Viaduct, it was built by the Newcastle and Carlisle Railway Company to carry the railway over the River Eden. It is in sandstone, and consists of five wide semicircular arches each spanning 27 metres (89 ft). The viaduct has channelled rustication, voussoirs, and a parapet 1.5 metres (4 ft 11 in) high. It has a total height of 33 metres (108 ft) and is 280 metres (920 ft) long. A cast iron footbridge was added in 1851.	I
Corby Viaduct; 54.88547°N 2.82371°W	—	1830–34	The viaduct was built by the Newcastle and Carlisle Railway Company to carry the railway over the Corby Beck. It is in sandstone, and consists of seven arches each spanning 13 metres (43 ft). The viaduct has channelled rustication, voussoirs, and a parapet. It has a height of 23 metres (75 ft) and is 160 metres (520 ft) long.	II
Blacksmith's Shop; 54.88144°N 2.82442°W		1833	Originating as a blacksmith's shop, later a workshop, with a porch for shoeing horses at the front. It is in sandstone with a slate roof, a single storey with an attic, and one bay. At the front is a large round moulded arch on short columns with capitals. Above the arch is a carved panel, a moulded cornice, and a blocking course. To the sides of the porch are decorative buttresses and short walls ending in moulded piers with stone benches.	II
Lodge, Warwick Hall; 54.90212°N 2.83212°W	—	1833–35	The lodge is in sandstone on a plinth. with angle pilasters, a moulded cornice forming pedimented gables, and a slate roof. The doorway has a pilastered surround, and the sash windows have moulded surrounds.	II
Warwick Bridge; 54.90244°N 2.82914°W		1833–35	The bridge carries the A69 road over the River Eden. It is in sandstone, and consists of three segmental arches on two piers with rounded cutwaters. The bridge has voussoirs, a string course, a solid parapet, and an inscribed stone.	II
Holme Eden Abbey; 54.90488°N 2.82544°W		1833–37	Originally a country house designed by John Dobson, it became an abbey in 1921, and was divided into apartments in the 2000s. The house is in sandstone with moulded dressings, a slate roof, and castellated chimneys and parapets. It has two storeys and three three-storey towers. The towers are joined by bays to surround a courtyard. The entrance tower incorporates a porch with a Gothic doorway, a hood mould, a stained glass window, and a coat of arms. The windows are mixed, some are mullioned and transomed, some are sashes, and others are casements.	II*
Lodge, Holme Eden Abbey; 54.90295°N 2.82798°W	—	1833–37	The lodge is in sandstone with a slate roof. It has one storey, three bays, and a rear extension. The gabled porch has a moulded surround above which is a panel, and over the door is a mullioned fanlight. The windows are casements with chamfered surrounds and hood moulds.	II
Edenbank; 54.88425°N 2.83285°W	—	1834	A house in calciferous sandstone with a string course, overhanging eaves, and a hipped slate roof. There are two storeys and three bays. On the front is a porch with Doric pilasters, and a moulded entablature and cornice. Above the door is a patterned fanlight, and the sash windows have plain surrounds.	II
The Lodge; 54.89581°N 2.88510°W		1834–35	Originally the lodge for Rose Hill, later a private house, it is in sandstone with a slate roof. There is one storey and three bays. In the centre of the front is a projecting gabled porch on four square columns with moulded capitals. The windows are sashes with plain surrounds. On the right side is a canted bay window.	II
Stone House and stable 54.90362°N 2.82130°W	—	1830s	The house and stable are in sandstone with a slate roof. The house has two storeys and three bays, and has a round-headed doorway with a quoined surround, and a hood mould. The stable to the left has two bays, and contains two round-headed entrances. The windows are sashes.	II
Tithe Barn Farmhouse; 54.90137°N 2.83577°W	—	1830s	A sandstone house with a slate roof, in two storeys and three bays. The doorway has pilaster strips, a plain entablature, a moulded cornice, and a fanlight. The windows are sashes with plain surrounds.	II
Warwick House; 54.90099°N 2.83562°W	—	1830s	A brick house on a chamfered plinth, with a moulded and dentilled eaves cornice, and a slate roof. There are two storeys and three bays, flanked by single-storey one-bay wings. On the front is a prostyle Roman Doric porch, and above the door is a fanlight. The windows are sashes with flat brick arches and stone sills.	II
Henry Lonsdale Home; 54.89618°N 2.88296°W		1835	Originally a house named Rose Hill, later used as a nursing home, it is built in stone from Cumwhinton quarry on a chamfered plinth, and has a moulded eaves cornice and a hipped slate roof. The house has two storeys, the central part has three bays, and there are semi-octagonal bays projecting diagonally from the corners. On the front is a curved tetrastyle Roman Doric porch with an ornamental frieze and a cast iron balcony. Above the doorway is a patterned round-headed fanlight with a keystone. The windows are sashes with plain surrounds.	II
Station master's house, offices and platform, Wetheral station 54.88386°N 2.83119°W	—	1835–38	The ticket office, clerk's office, waiting rooms, station master's house, and platform were built for the Newcastle and Carlisle Railway. A platform canopy was built in 1861, part of which remains. In the 1880s additions, including rebuilding and adding an upper storey to the station master's house, were made for the North Eastern Railway. The other buildings have one storey, and all are in Tudor style, in calciferous sandstone, and with slate roofs. The buildings were later used as a private house.	II
Gate piers and walls, Holme Eden Abbey; 54.90291°N 2.82808°W	—	1837	The gate piers and walls are in sandstone. The piers are about 2 metres (6 ft 7 in) high, in Tudor style, and consist of octagonal columns with moulded octagonal castellated heads. The flanking screen walls are about 1.5 metres (4 ft 11 in) high and have moulded coping.	II
Corby Bridge Inn; 54.88497°N 2.82537°W		1838	The inn is stuccoed on a chamfered plinth, and has quoins and a hipped slate roof. There are two storeys and three bays. The fronts facing the road and the railway are identical, and each contains a doorway with a pilastered surround and sash windows with plain surrounds.	II
The Corn Mill; 54.90408°N 2.82155°W		1839	A water mill in sandstone with a hipped slate roof. There are 2 1/2 storeys and a central block of two bays, a three-bay extension to the south, and an extension to the east. The doorways and the sash windows have plain surrounds, and on the ridge is a weathervane incorporating a lion. The southern extension contains a dovecote with multiple openings, and a cart entrance. Inside the mill is an undershot water wheel, and at the entrance is an internal loading platform.	II*
Milford and Grove Cottage; 54.88107°N 2.82380°W	—	1830s to 1840s	A pair of sandstone houses with quoins and a slate roof, in two storeys. Milford has three bays, and Grove Cottage has two. The doorways and sash windows have plain surrounds. Above the doorway of Milford is a cornice on console brackets. and above the entrance to Grove Cottage is a pair of carved dogs.	II
Church of St Mary and St Wilfred; 54.90328°N 2.82001°W		1840–41	A Roman Catholic church designed by A. W. N. Pugin, it is in sandstone and has a slate roof with coped gables. The church consists of a nave with a south porch, and a chancel with a south sacristy. On the west gable is a hexagonal bellcote. The windows are lancets, some with Y-tracery, and the interior is richly decorated.	II*
Priest's House; 54.90315°N 2.81968°W	—	1840–41	A presbytery and attached stable block serving the Church of St Mary and St Wilfred designed by A. W. N. Pugin in Victorian Gothic style. It is in sandstone with a hipped slate roof. There are two storeys and an essentially square plan, with sides of two and three bays. On the entrance is a gabled porch with a pointed entrance, and the windows have pointed heads. To the east is a service wing and a stable block that has been converted into a parish room.	II
Statue of St Constantine; 54.87377°N 2.83102°W	—	1843	The statue stands in the grounds of Corby Castle, opposite St Constantine's Cells, on the other side of the River Eden. It is in sandstone and consists of a full-size figure of St Constantine on a pedestal.	II
Screen walls and gate piers, Corby Castle; 54.88047°N 2.82296°W		1844	The piers and walls are in sandstone. There are two pairs of piers, each pair joined by a curved wall. The piers are square, each has decorative console brackets, a moulded cornice, and a carved Grecian vase. The walls then extend on each side for about 50 metres (160 ft), and have a chamfered plinth and a moulded coping. At the ends of the walls are piers with a dated panel, a coat of arms and initials.	I
Dixon Monument; 54.88162°N 2.83103°W	—	1844	The monument is in the churchyard of Wetheral Parish Church. It is in sandstone, 2 metres (6 ft 7 in) high, and in Grecian style. The monument consists of a squared column with inscribed panels standing on a chamfered base, and it has a cornice carrying an ornate carved vase.	II
Brook Villa; 54.88382°N 2.82042°W	—	1845	Built as a schoolmaster's house, it is in sandstone with a slate roof. There are two storeys and three bays. It has a projecting porch with a Tudor arched entrance, above which is a hood mould and a tablet containing a coat of arms. The windows are sashes with chamfered mullions and surrounds, the upper floor windows in gabled dormers.	II
Great Corby School; 54.88369°N 2.81976°W		1845	The school was extended in 1882, and is in sandstone with slate roofs. The original part has two storeys and three bays. It has a projecting two-storey porch, with a Tudor arched entrance, a corbelled out upper storey containing a lancet window, and crow-stepped gable. The later part has one storey, and four bays separated by buttresses, decorative ridge tiles, and a wooden bellcote. The windows in both parts are sashes.	II
St Paul's Church; 54.89887°N 2.82293°W		1845–46	The church was designed by John Dobson in Norman style. It is in sandstone and has Welsh slate roofs with coped gables. The church consists of a nave, a chancel with a polygonal apse and a vestry, and a west steeple. The steeple has a tower with clasping buttresses, a south porch, a string course, and a broach spire with lucarnes.	II
Brookside; 54.90395°N 2.82178°W	—	1853–54	Originally a miller's house, it is in sandstone on a plinth, with quoins, a shaped string course, and a hipped slate roof. There are two storeys and three bays. The doorway is flanked by pilaster strips, and has a plain entablature, a moulded cornice with console brackets, and a fanlight. The windows are sashes with pilaster strip surrounds. Above the doorway is a gabled dormer, and on the west wall is a projecting chimney stack containing a coat of arms.	II
All Saints Church; 54.89887°N 2.82293°W		1854–55	The church was designed by Anthony Salvin for George Head Head. It is in sandstone with quoins and a slate roof. The church consists of a nave with a south porch, a chancel, and a southeast tower. The tower is on a chamfered plinth, it has two stages, a string course, a moulded cornice, and an embattled parapet. The windows are lancets.	II
Wetheral Abbey Farm; 54.87921°N 2.83038°W		1857	A model farm, adjacent to Wetheral Priory Gatehouse, incorporating material from the medieval priory. The farmhouse and farm buildings are in red sandstone with roofs in Westmorland and Welsh slate. The farmhouse has two storeys and a cellar, and has a T-shaped plan with an additional east range. The farm buildings have two storeys and consist of rectangular ranges around three sides of a yard. Attached to the farmhouse are garden walls containing cast iron gates.	II
Eden Mount; 54.88140°N 2.83453°W	—	1872	A large brick house in Victorian Gothic style, with stone quoins and carvings, and a slate roof. It has two storeys and an attic, and consists of a main block, two wings at the rear and a dormitory block, and a three-storey tower with a metal finial. The entrance has a segmental arch, and it is flanked by bay windows, one canted, the other rectangular. Features include windows of various types, gables with decorated bargeboards, and bracketed eaves.	II
Drybeck Viaduct; 54.82357°N 2.76587°W		1875	The viaduct was built by the Midland Railway for the Settle-Carlisle Line. It is in sandstone with brick soffits, and consists of seven arches carried on tapering piers with imposts. The viaduct has a string course and solid parapets.	II
Cumwhinton Station; 54.86975°N 2.85211°W		1875	A disused railway station built for the Settle-Carlisle Line of the Midland Railway. It is in sandstone with slate roofs, and has one storey. In the centre is the booking office, flanked by gables, with gabled bays outside these. The windows are sashes, and all the gables have elaborate pierced bargeboards. There is a small shelter to the north.	II
Road bridge, Cumwhinton Station; 54.86948°N 2.85159°W	—	1875	The bridge carries the B6263 road over the Settle-Carlisle Line of the former Midland Railway. It is in sandstone with brick soffits to the arch. The bridge consists of a single arch with a band at road level, and cambered wing walls on the sides.	II
Railway Cottages, Cumwhinton Station; 54.86911°N 2.85258°W	—	1875	A row of four sandstone cottages with slate roofs, for the Settle-Carlisle Line of the Midland Railway. They have two storeys, and each cottage has two bays. They have paired gabled porches and casement windows.	II
Stationmaster's House, Cumwhinton Station; 54.86939°N 2.85234°W	—	1875	The house with a slate roof, and has an L-shaped plan, two storeys and two bays. There are gabled projections on both fronts, a gabled porch, and a gabled dormer; all the gables have pierced bargeboards. The windows are casements.	II
Footbridge, Wetheral Station; 54.88372°N 2.83134°W		1880	The footbridge was built for the North Eastern Railway, and is in cast iron with a wooden walkway. Approaching on both sides are L-shaped flights of steps leading to an arched walkway. The bridge is carried on four cast iron columns, and it has a latticed balustrade.	II
Holme Eden War Memorial; 54.89900°N 2.82329°W		1919	The war memorial is in the churchyard of St Paul's Church. It is in grey granite, and consists of a Celtic cross on a bowed shaft on a rough hewn base. The head of the cross has interlace ornament, and there is a carved wreath at the base. On the shaft are inscriptions and the names of those lost in the two World Wars.	II
Cotehill War Memorial; 54.84355°N 2.82791°W	—	1920	The war memorial is in the churchyard of St John's Church, Cotehill, against the west wall of the church. It is in grey granite, and consists of a Latin cross on a tapering shaft, a four-sided plinth, and a single-stepped base. On the front of the cross is inscribed "PEACE", and on the plinth are inscriptions and the names of those lost in the two World Wars.	II
Scotby War Memorial; 54.88828°N 2.87352°W		1920	The memorial is in the churchyard of All Saints Church, Scotby, and is in red sandstone. It consists of a tall Latin cross with an octagonal shaft on an octagonal plinth standing on three octagonal steps. On the plinth is an inscription and the names of those lost in the two World Wars.	II
Cumwhinton War Memorial; 54.86677°N 2.85738°W		1922	The war memorial stands in a semicircular enclosure by the roadside. It is in polished Aberdeen granite, and consists of an infilled wheel-head cross with a tapering shaft. This is on a tapering plinth and is surrounded by a cairn of roughhewn stones. The head of the cross has carved bosses, and the lower part of the shaft and the plinth carry inscriptions and the names of those lost in the two World Wars.	II
Warwick Hall; 54.90440°N 2.83322°W		1934–35	A country house replacing an earlier house of 1828 that was destroyed by fire. The house is in sandstone with a green slate roof. It has two storeys and seven bays, and a two-storey three-bay wing. The central three bays project forward and have pilaster strips and a parapet with an open balustrade. The windows are sashes. On the roof is a polygonal cupola, with stone columns supporting a copper dome.	II

== Notes and references ==
=== Sources ===
- Historic England, "St Constantine's Cells, Wetheral (1087654)", National Heritage List for England
- Historic England, "St Constantine's cells (Wetheral Caves) and rock-cut Roman inscription, Wetheral (1007160)", National Heritage List for England
- Historic England, "Salmon coops to South of Corby Castle, Wetheral (1087677)", National Heritage List for England
- Historic England, "Church of St Leonard, Wetheral (1121876)", National Heritage List for England
- Historic England, "Church of the Holy Trinity and St Constantine, Wetheral (1087692)", National Heritage List for England
- Historic England, "Corby Castle, Wetheral (1087717)", National Heritage List for England
- Historic England, "Wetheral Priory Gatehouse, Wetheral (1087695)", National Heritage List for England
- Historic England, "Wetheral Priory gatehouse and length of medieval wall, Wetheral (1007904)", National Heritage List for England
- Historic England, "Walls of east range of Wetheral Priory, east of Gatehouse, Wetheral (1336985)", National Heritage List for England
- Historic England, "Cote House, Wetheral (1111822)", National Heritage List for England
- Historic England, "Folly east of Whoof House, Wetheral (1323161)", National Heritage List for England
- Historic England, "Howard Tomb in churchyard near east window of Wetheral Church, Wetheral (1335544)", National Heritage List for England
- Historic England, "Byre Hill Farmhouse, Corby Castle Estate, Wetheral (1087676)", National Heritage List for England
- Historic England, "Chapel Farmhouse, Wetheral (1087710)", National Heritage List for England
- Historic England, "Green Farmhouse, Wetheral (1087679)", National Heritage List for England
- Historic England, "Dovecote to south-east of Corby Castle, Wetheral (1335536)", National Heritage List for England
- Historic England, "Clematis Cottage, Wetheral (1087716)", National Heritage List for England
- Historic England, "Sunny Nook, Wetheral (1335517)", National Heritage List for England
- Historic England, "Cascade to west of Corby castle, Wetheral (1335535)", National Heritage List for England
- Historic England, "Friends Meeting House, Wetheral (1335539)", National Heritage List for England
- Historic England, "Orchard House, Wetheral (1087705)", National Heritage List for England
- Historic England, "Statue of Polyphemus, Corby Castle, Wetheral (1087675)", National Heritage List for England
- Historic England, "Tempietto, Corby Castle, Wetheral (1335537)", National Heritage List for England
- Historic England, "Eden Brow Park Cottage, Wetheral (1087652)", National Heritage List for England
- Historic England, "Greystones, Wetheral (1087694)", National Heritage List for England
- Historic England, "Hawthorn Cottage, Wetheral (1121532)", National Heritage List for England
- Historic England, "Howard Cottage, Wetheral (1087688)", National Heritage List for England
- Historic England, "Ivy House, Wetheral (1120898)", National Heritage List for England
- Historic England, "Wheelbarrow Hall, Wetheral (1337013)", National Heritage List for England
- Historic England, "Froddle Crook, Wetheral (1335563)", National Heritage List for England
- Historic England, "The Shrubbery, Wetheral (1087657)", National Heritage List for England
- Historic England, "Birkhill Farmhouse and attached farm buildings to South, Wetheral (1049105)", National Heritage List for England
- Historic England, "Sundial south of Wetheral Church, Wetheral (1087693)", National Heritage List for England
- Historic England, "Edenside Cottage and The Cottage, Wetheral (1335545)", National Heritage List for England
- Historic England, "Green Farm, Wetheral (1335513)", National Heritage List for England
- Historic England, "Moorhouse Hall, Wetheral (1337672)", National Heritage List for England
- Historic England, "Gate piers railings and wall to North of Moorhouse Hall, Wetheral (1087684)", National Heritage List for England
- Historic England, "Orchard House, Wetheral (1323178)", National Heritage List for England
- Historic England, "Warwick Green, Wetheral (1335541)", National Heritage List for England
- Historic England, "Yew Tree House, Wetheral (1087712)", National Heritage List for England
- Historic England, "Holme House, Wetheral (1087709)", National Heritage List for England
- Historic England, "The Mill, Wetheral (1087706)", National Heritage List for England
- Historic England, "Crown Hotel, Wetheral (1087707)", National Heritage List for England
- Historic England, "Low House, Wetheral (1111796)", National Heritage List for England
- Historic England, "Kitchen garden walls to south-east of Corby Castle, Wetheral (1122629)", National Heritage List for England
- Historic England, "Orchard Lodge, Wetheral (1121142)", National Heritage List for England
- Historic England, "Wetheral Cross, Wetheral (1323117)", National Heritage List for England
- Historic England, "Nos. 1 to 6 High Buildings, Wetheral (1335514)", National Heritage List for England
- Historic England, "Nos. 8 to 12 High Buildings, Wetheral (1120913)", National Heritage List for England
- Historic England, "Gate Lodge to east of Corby Castle, Wetheral (1335534)", National Heritage List for England
- Historic England, "Acorn Bank, Wetheral (1322406)", National Heritage List for England
- Historic England, "Cairn House, Wetheral (1087687)", National Heritage List for England
- Historic England, "Cringles, Wetheral (1120818)", National Heritage List for England
- Historic England, "The Grange, Wetheral (1335515)", National Heritage List for England
- Historic England, "Myrtle Cottage, Holly Cottage, Wetheral (1087715)", National Heritage List for England
- Historic England, "Oak House, Wetheral (1120801)", National Heritage List for England
- Historic England, "The Plain, The Old Rectory and The Plains, Wetheral (1323129)", National Heritage List for England
- Historic England, "Queens Inn, Wetheral (1335542)", National Heritage List for England
- Historic England, "Red Beeches and wall to right, Wetheral (1087680)", National Heritage List for England
- Historic England, "River House, Wetheral (1322404)", National Heritage List for England
- Historic England, "Wellholme, Wetheral (1121906)", National Heritage List for England
- Historic England, "Whitegate, Wetheral (1087708)", National Heritage List for England
- Historic England, "The Old Chapel, Wetheral (1087682)", National Heritage List for England
- Historic England, "Stable Block to north west of Warwick Hall, Wetheral (1087681)", National Heritage List for England
- Historic England, "Milestone, Wetheral (1087683)", National Heritage List for England
- Historic England, "Corby Bridge, Wetheral (1087690)", National Heritage List for England
- Historic England, "Corby Viaduct, Wetheral (1087711)", National Heritage List for England
- Historic England, "Blacksmith's Shop, Wetheral (1335516)", National Heritage List for England
- Historic England, "Lodge south of Warwick Hall, Wetheral (1335540)", National Heritage List for England
- Historic England, "Warwick Bridge, Wetheral (1123701)", National Heritage List for England
- Historic England, "Holme Eden Abbey, Wetheral (1087685)", National Heritage List for England
- Historic England, "Lodge to south of Holme Eden, Wetheral (1337663)", National Heritage List for England
- Historic England, "Edenbank, Wetheral (1111858)", National Heritage List for England
- Historic England, "The Lodge, Wetheral (1087653)", National Heritage List for England
- Historic England, "Stone House and stable adjoining, Wetheral (1336974)", National Heritage List for England
- Historic England, "Tithe Barn Farmhouse, Wetheral (1123723)", National Heritage List for England
- Historic England, "Warwick House, Wetheral (1123727)", National Heritage List for England
- Historic England, "Henry Lonsdale Home (Rose Hill), Wetheral (1111831)", National Heritage List for England
- Historic England, "Station Master's House and offices, with stone platform to front, Wetheral (1336960)", National Heritage List for England
- Historic England, "Wall and gate piers to south of Holme Eden Abbey, Wetheral (1335543)", National Heritage List for England
- Historic England, "Corby Bridge Inn, Wetheral (1120829)", National Heritage List for England
- Historic England, "The Corn Mill, Wetheral (1087686)", National Heritage List for England
- Historic England, "Milford and Grove Cottage, Wetheral (1122689)", National Heritage List for England
- Historic England, "Church of St Mary and St Wilfred, Wetheral (1111897)", National Heritage List for England
- Historic England, "The Priests House, adjacent to the Church of St Mary and St Wilfred, Wetheral (1250282)", National Heritage List for England
- Historic England, "Statue of St Constantine, south of Corby Castle, Wetheral (1087678)", National Heritage List for England
- Historic England, "Wall and gate piers to East of Corby Castle, Wetheral (1087674)", National Heritage List for England
- Historic England, "Dixon monument in north-west corner of Wetheral Churchyard, Wetheral (1112550)", National Heritage List for England
- Historic England, "Brook Villa, Wetheral (1087714)", National Heritage List for England
- Historic England, "Great Corby School, Wetheral (1087713)", National Heritage List for England
- Historic England, "Church of St Paul, Wetheral (1087689)", National Heritage List for England
- Historic England, "Brookside, Wetheral (1336942)", National Heritage List for England
- Historic England, "Church of All Saints, Wetheral (1335538)", National Heritage List for England
- Historic England, "Wetheral Abbey Farm, Wetheral (1452573)", National Heritage List for England
- Historic England, "Eden Mount, Wetheral (1329372)", National Heritage List for England
- Historic England, "Drybeck Viaduct At NGR NY 509 479, Wetheral (1087656)", National Heritage List for England
- Historic England, "Cumwhinton Station, Wetheral (1335564)", National Heritage List for England
- Historic England, "Road bridge at Cumwhinton Station, Wetheral (1335565)", National Heritage List for England
- Historic England, "Railway Cottages at Cumwhinton Station, Wetheral (1250244)", National Heritage List for England
- Historic England, "Former Stationmasters House at Cumwhinton Station, Wetheral (1087655)", National Heritage List for England
- Historic England, "Footbridge at east end of Wetheral Station, Wetheral (1087691)", National Heritage List for England
- Historic England, "Holme Eden War Memorial, Wetheral (1457982)", National Heritage List for England
- Historic England, "Cotehill War Memorial, Wetheral (1457967)", National Heritage List for England
- Historic England, "Scotby War Memorial, Wetheral (1463529)", National Heritage List for England
- Historic England, "Cumwhinton War Memorial, Wetheral (1458593)", National Heritage List for England
- Historic England, "Warwick Hall, Wetheral (1121918)", National Heritage List for England
- Historic England, Listed Buildings
- Hyde, Matthew; Pevsner, Nikolaus (2010) [1967], Cumbria, The Buildings of England, New Haven and London: Yale University Press, ISBN 978-0-300-12663-1
