= Warwick-on-Eden =

Coordinates: 54.901°N 2.835°W

- Village
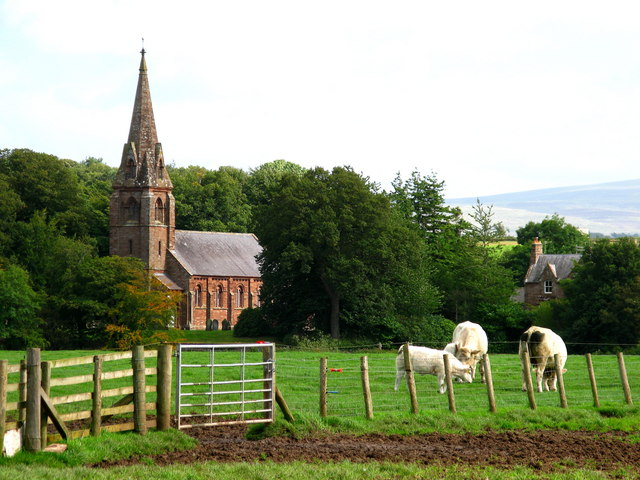
- Warwick-on-Eden looking across farmland near Eden Garth towards St. Paul's Church

- Location in the former Carlisle district Location within Cumbria
- OS grid reference: NY464565
- Civil parish: Wetheral
- Unitary authority: Cumberland
- Ceremonial county: Cumbria
- Region: North West
- Country: England
- Sovereign state: United Kingdom
- Post town: CARLISLE
- Postcode district: CA4
- Dialling code: 01228
- Police: Cumbria
- Fire: Cumbria
- Ambulance: North West
- UK Parliament: Carlisle

Warwick-on-Eden is a small village and (as just Warwick) a former civil parish, now in the parish of Wetheral, in Cumbria, England. In 1931 the parish had a population of 269. On 1 April 1935 the parish was abolished and merged with Wetheral.

== Location ==
It is located on the River Eden and also near the River Irthing and is on the A69 road about seven miles from Carlisle and about seven miles from Brampton.

== Other nearby settlements ==
Other nearby settlements include the villages of Wetheral, Warwick Bridge, Scotby and Aglionby.

== Amenities ==
The community was served by two places of worship: St Leonard's Church and St. Paul's Church. However, St Leonard's Church has closed (with the building up for sale).

== See also ==
- Listed buildings in Wetheral
