= Corby Bridge =

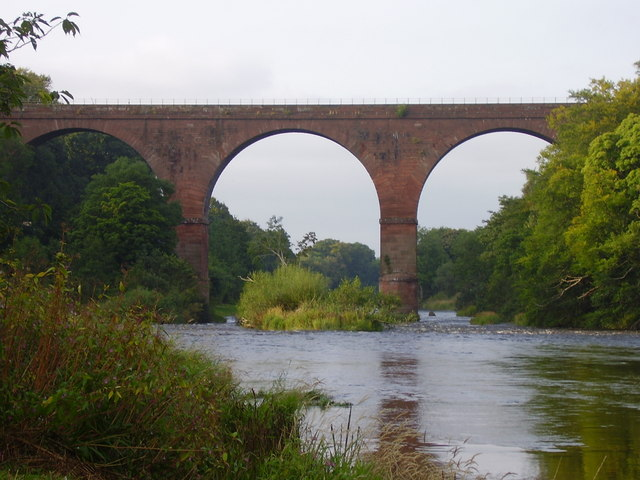
- The south face of the viaduct, from the riverbank
- Coordinates: 54.88393°N 2.82981°W
- Carries: Tyne Valley Line
- Crosses: River Eden
- Locale: Wetheral, Cumbria, England
- Other names: Wetheral Viaduct; Eden Viaduct
- Maintained by: Network Rail
- Heritage status: Grade I listed building

Characteristics
- Material: Red sandstone
- Total length: 660 feet (200 m)
- Height: 100 feet (30 m)
- Longest span: 89 feet (27 m)
- No. of spans: 5
- Piers in water: 2

History
- Constructed by: William S. Denton
- Construction start: 1830
- Construction end: 1834

Corby Bridge (also known as Wetheral Viaduct to distinguish it from the nearby Corby Viaduct) is a railway viaduct adjacent to and immediately east of Wetheral railway station at Wetheral, near Carlisle, in north-western England, begun in 1830 and completed in 1834. It is 920 feet (280 m) long and 100 feet (30 m) high, and has been a Grade I listed building since 1 April 1957.

== Background ==
The idea of linking Newcastle upon Tyne on England's east coast with Carlisle on the west dates back to at least the 1770s, when proposals were tabled for a canal. The prospectus for the Newcastle and Carlisle Railway was published in 1825 and construction work began in 1829 under the supervision of Francis Giles. The line was one of the earliest mainline railways and Britain's first major east-west line.

Giles was the consulting engineer for the entire line but was also directly responsible for the principal works at the western end, which presented some of the greatest engineering challenges on the route, including Corby Bridge and Corby Viaduct immediately to the east, and the Gelt Bridge further along the line. The bridge is named as "Corby Bridge" on Ordnance Survey maps but widely known as "Wetheral Viaduct".

== Description ==
The bridge consists of five semi-circular arches, supported by six piers—two in the river bed and two on each bank. Each arch has a span of 89 feet (27 metres), built from large blocks of stone with decorative channelling to the joints and voussoirs. A parapet extends 1.5 metres (4.9 feet) above the bridge deck, below which is a deep square cornice. The structure, including the parapet, is 33 metres (108 feet) above the summer height of the River Eden, wide enough to carry two tracks, and has a total length of 280 metres (920 feet) The bridge is faced with red sandstone from Newbiggin Quarry near Carlisle and filled with sandstone rubble from Wetheral and Corby Beck Quarries. It still carries the double-track Tyne Valley Line, and includes a footbridge connecting Wetheral with Great Corby. The footbridge is supported on cantilevers attached to the north face of the main bridge, parallel to the parapet. The walkway consists of wooden planks and has Gothic-style iron railings on the far side; it is approached from the road via 93 steps.

At the western end of the parapets is a plaque on each side, one in English and one in Latin, which reads "In testimony of respect for their late colleague Henry Howard Esq., who, on 25 March 1830, laid the foundation stone of this bridge, the directors of the railway place this tablet."

== History ==
Construction of the viaduct began in 1830 and took four years to complete; it opened on 12 August 1834. The works were carried out by the contractor, William S. Denton.

The footbridge was added to the north face in 1851 to provide a route across the river for pedestrians and deter them from trespassing on track bed. Initially, a half-penny toll was charged, having risen to a penny by the time the station closed in 1956 (train services resumed in 1981). Pedestrian passage is now free. The footbridge was designed by P. Tate, engineer, and built by C.D. Richardson, the contractor, whose names are inscribed on foundation stones.

The Corby Bridge Inn was opened nearby in the same year as the viaduct to provide accommodation for railway travellers and named for the viaduct. The inn is mentioned in Scott's Railway Companion, a guide to the Newcastle & Carlisle route, published in 1838. It is a grade II listed building. Gordon Biddle, a railway historian, described the viaduct as "much larger and more imposing" than other structures on the route. It is a grade I listed building.

== See also ==
- Grade I listed buildings in Cumbria
- Listed buildings in Wetheral

== Gallery ==
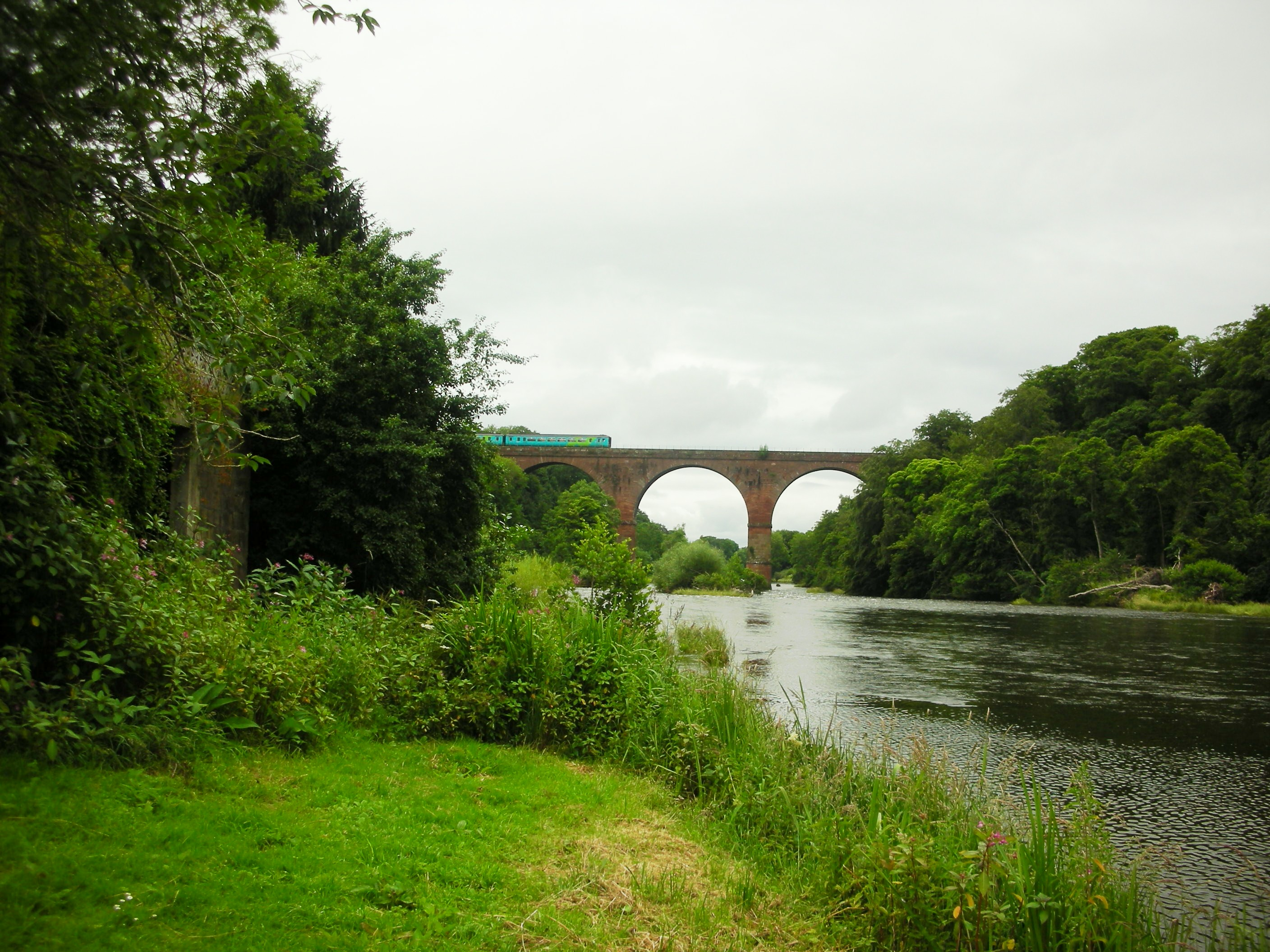
View from the river

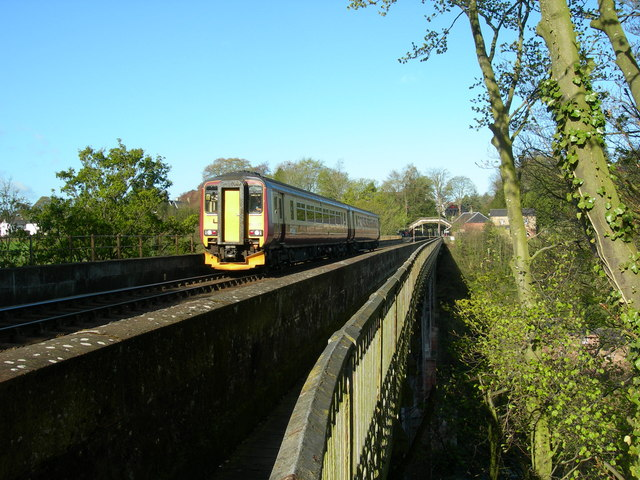
The viaduct's north side, with footpath nearest the camera, and the station footbridge visible in the background

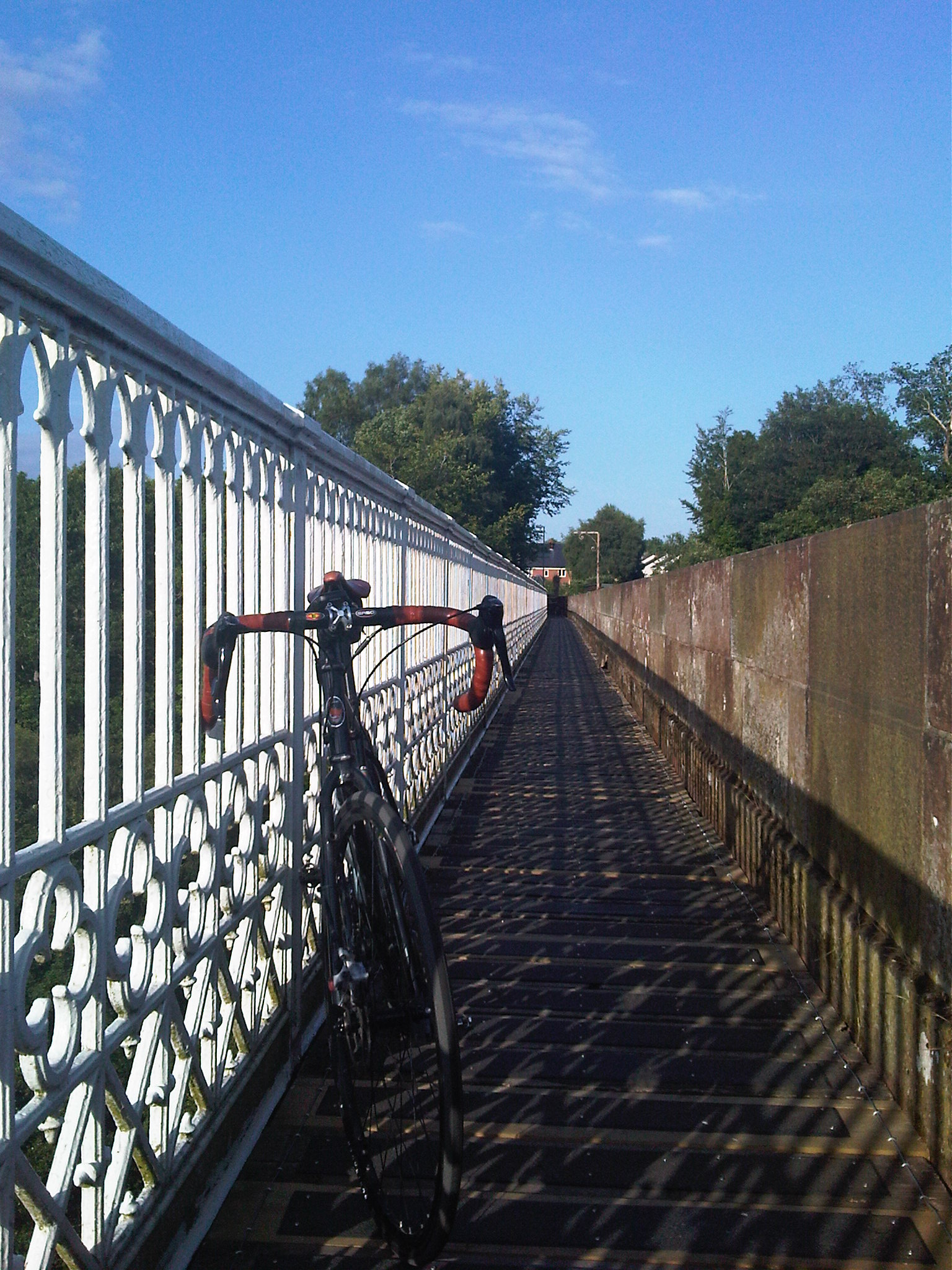
The footpath
