= Francis Giles =

English canal engineer and surveyor

Francis Giles (c. 1787 – 4 March 1847) was an English canal engineer and surveyor who worked under John Rennie and later became a railway engineer.

== Works and appointments ==
- Kent & Sussex Junction Canal 1811 – with Netlam Giles surveyed the route as part of John Rennie's check of Alexander Sutherland's work.
- Stort - Cam Canal 1811 – re-surveyed the route with Netlam Giles under the direction of John Rennie.
- Wey and Arun Junction Canal 1815 – with Netlam Giles surveyed a route from the Croydon Canal to Newbridge in the Arun valley

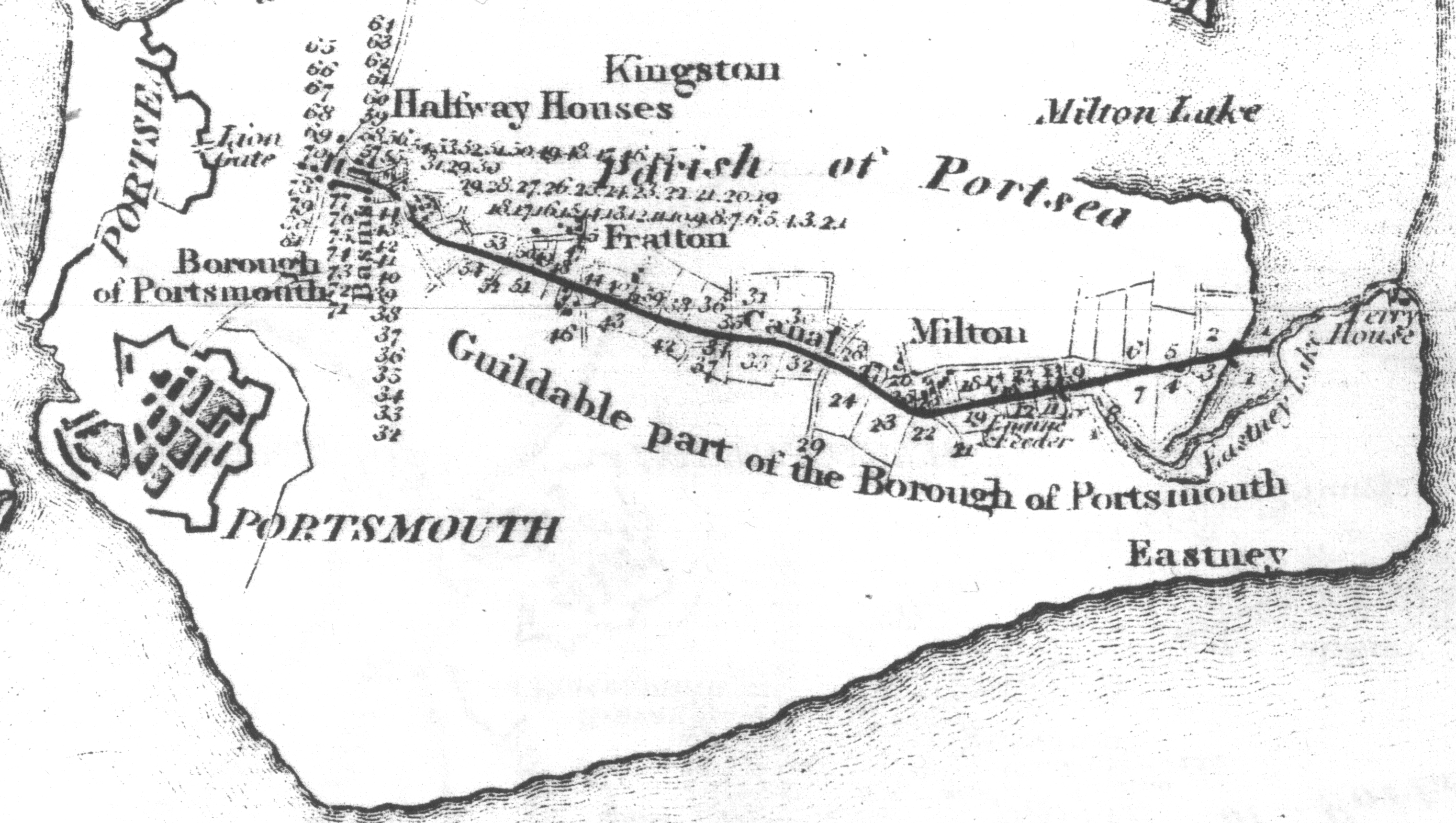
Part of a map of the then proposed route of the Portsmouth & Arundel Canal produced by Netlam & Francis Giles

- Portsmouth & Arundel Canal 1815 – with Netlam Giles surveyed a route for the canal on behalf of John Rennie.
- Western Union Canal project 1819 – plan of the canal for the Kennet & Avon Canal committee.
- River Ivel – 1821 – costed river navigation from Biggleswade to Langford Bridge and to Hitchin and Baldock.
- River Ivel 1822 – costed river navigation to Shefford.
- Aire & Calder Navigation – Wakefield Section 1822 - worked on alternative schemes based on John Rennie's plans for deepening the river to 7 feet and to take 100 ton craft.
- Hertford Union Canal (Grand Union) 1824 – appointed engineer.
- Hants & Berks Junction Canal 1825 – surveyed proposed a 13 mile canal with a half-mile tunnel, one inclined plane and a number of locks.
- London to Portsmouth Ship Canal – 1825 – took levels for the combined scheme of John Rennie, James Elmes and N W Cundy.
- Liverpool Canal project 1830 – proposed route linking the Bridgewater, Sankey and Mersey & Irwell by a Mersey aqueduct.
- Birmingham and Warwick Junction Canal 1830 – appointed engineer.
- Sankey Brook Navigation 1831 – appointed engineer for extension to Widnes.
- River Lee – surveyed the river and recommended that the number of locks be reduced to 17 from the 25 principal locks and 3 half locks.
- Newcastle and Carlisle Railway – appointed engineer; directly responsible for Corby Bridge, Corby Viaduct, and Gelt Bridge at the western end of the route
- London and Southampton Railway 1831 – appointed engineer. (later renamed the London and South Western Railway)
- Southampton Docks 1836 – appointed engineer
- Reading, Guildford and Reigate Railway 1846 – appointed Engineer-in-Chief

== Pupil and assistant to Sir John Rennie ==
Rennie employed Giles, his former pupil, to carry out the detail work for the survey of the London to Portsmouth Ship Canal.

== The Chat Moss debacle ==
Rennie organised the opposition to George Stephenson's route for the Liverpool and Manchester Railway. He made sure Giles was called as a witness. Giles famously stated:

No engineer in his senses would go through Chat Moss if he wanted to make a railway from Liverpool to Manchester. In my judgement a railroad certainly cannot be safely made over Chat Moss without going to the bottom of the Moss.

== Engineer to the London and Southampton Railway ==
Giles was appointed engineer of the London & Southampton Railway in 1831. As a result of overestimate of the costs and difficulty of crossing Chat Moss he was regarded as a cautious and safe man. However he greatly underestimated the cost of building the London and Southampton and soon got into difficulties. Stephenson was highly critical stating that "the whole wealth of the company would be forever buried." in the St George's Hill cutting at Weybridge. There were extensive delays and costs escalated out of hand. Shares slumped.

Giles came in for considerable criticism. At the time he was also surveying the Portsmouth Junction Railway and had become engineer to Southampton Docks. His original estimate of 1834 of £894,874 was amended to £1,507,753 in 1836. Lancashire shareholders, demanded the figures be confirmed by another engineer, but even then should Giles remain in office, they recommend that no further capital should be forthcoming. Giles made an unauthorised approach to influential landowners and shareholders for further money and proposed deferring the bill to borrow further money, suggesting that the central unfinished portion of the line should be left incomplete until revenue from the completed London to Basingstoke and Winchester to Southampton sections were forthcoming. Giles was dismissed and Joseph Locke appointed in his place.
