= Cotehill =

Coordinates: 54.844°N 2.829°W

- Village
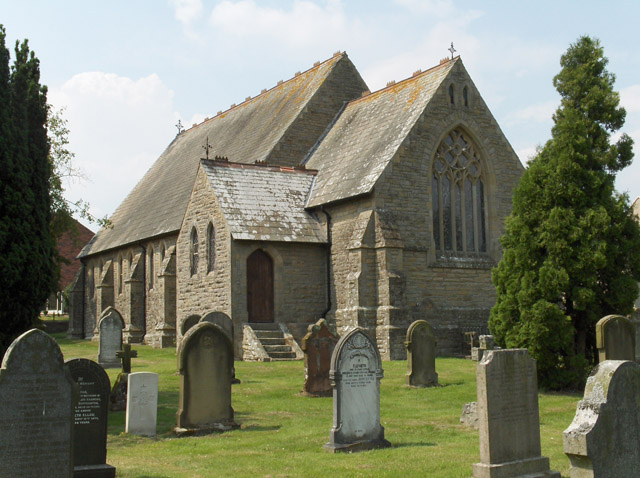
- St. John the Evangelist's Church

- Location in the former Carlisle district, Cumbria Location within Cumbria
- OS grid reference: NY467502
- Civil parish: Wetheral
- Unitary authority: Cumberland
- Ceremonial county: Cumbria
- Region: North West
- Country: England
- Sovereign state: United Kingdom
- Post town: CARLISLE
- Postcode district: CA4
- Dialling code: 01228
- Police: Cumbria
- Fire: Cumbria
- Ambulance: North West
- UK Parliament: Carlisle

Cotehill is a village in Cumbria, England. In 1870-72 the township/chapelry had a population of 333.

== See also ==
- Cotehill railway station
- Listed buildings in Wetheral
