= 1836 Wetheral train accident =

Train acceident on the Newcastle and Carlisle Railway

Coordinates: 54.88373°N 2.83141°W

The Wetheral train accident occurred in England at about 4 p. m. on Saturday 3 December 1836 when a passenger train on the Newcastle and Carlisle Railway was wrongly diverted into a siding at Wetheral, a village close to Carlisle, Cumbria. The train derailed and crushed three people to death.

== Description of the accident ==
=== Background ===
The Newcastle & Carlisle Railway opened in sections from March 1835, with the whole line opening to passengers on 18 June 1838. Lord Carlisle owned extensive coal-mining interests in Cumberland and had built and operated the Brampton Railway connecting his coal mines from the late 18th century. The new Newcastle and Carlisle Railway crossed and connected with the Brampton Railway at Brampton Junction.

=== The site ===
Six or eight miles westwards along the Newcastle and Carlisle Railway from Brampton Junction is the village of Wetheral and a few hundred yards before Wetheral railway station is the hamlet of Great Corby. At Great Corby there was a siding owned by Lord Carlisle that led to coal staithes (where the track was supported above ground level to allow easy transfer of coal from rail wagons into road wagons). The siding was entered from the Brampton Junction (i.e. Newcastle) direction and when travelling from that direction there is quite a steep gradient down to the siding. The operation of the point for the siding was the responsibility of an employee of Lord Carlisle (and not the railway company), and part of the responsibility was to make sure the point was left set for the main line, not the siding, once trains had passed onto and away from the siding. (Note: In the very early days of railways the enormity of the risk of potentially catastrophic accidents was not fully appreciated. At the time, the task of operating a point on the main-line giving access onto a siding was broadly considered equivalent to opening a field gate to allow a horse and cart to pass through – a task that could quite properly be given to an unsupervised and relatively junior person.)

=== Approach of the train ===
At about 4 p.m. on Saturday 3 December 1836, a train was travelling westwards towards Carlisle, drawn by the locomotive SAMSON, with 26 passengers aboard plus a heavy load of goods. About half a mile before the siding the driver shut the locomotive regulator and the train descended the gradient. On reaching a bridge just before the siding, the train driver saw a man upon the line and signalled to him to get out of the way. The driver then saw that the points were set for the siding rather than the main line. He set the locomotive into reverse and he and the fireman leaped off. Because of the downward gradient the train carried on its way unchecked.

=== Collision ===
The train ran onto the siding and onto the staithes. Six empty coal wagons, which were standing there, were struck and driven off the track. The stone pillars of the staithes that supported the track gave way, and the engine fell about eight feet, destroying the whole framework of the staithes. The tender followed. Next to the locomotive was an open horse wagon laden with corn that fell but landed upright. The horse wagon was followed by a laden freight wagon that fell upon the horse wagon.

=== Casualties ===
Although one of the passenger carriages was badly damaged, all the carriages stopped just before falling and stayed upon the tracks. All the passengers escaped without injury except one, who had his hand jammed between broken timbers. Unfortunately, a man named Henry Johnston, a dyer from Warwick on Eden, was on the staithes, and did not have time to get out of the way. He was fatally injured and died the next morning. Two boys, named Matthew Potts and John Kelsay, aged 14 and 16, had apparently stowed away in the horse wagon and were found crushed to death underneath the wagon that had fallen upon it. It was reported that the head of John Kelsay, "...was crushed quite flat, and presented a frightful spectacle".

== Coroner's Inquest ==
An inquest was held on Monday 12 December 1836. It lasted all day and a great number of witnesses were examined. The jury came to the verdict:

We find that Henry Johnston, Matthew Potts and John Kelsay came by their deaths accidentally, by reason of the locomotive steam engine called the Samson, and the carriages by which she was followed, running from the proper line of road, and breaking down a staith at Great Corby, such deviation from the right line being caused by the misplacing of certain points or switches at the west end of Corby-bridge ... This jury cannot separate without expressing its disapprobation of the conduct of the railway company in not placing their own responsible servants at every turn where such switches are placed, or insisting upon Lord Carlisle, and all others having private depots, giving such security for proper attention to the switches leading to such depots as will give the most perfect security attainable in such a mode of travelling to those whose lives are committed to their charge.
