= Gelt Bridge =

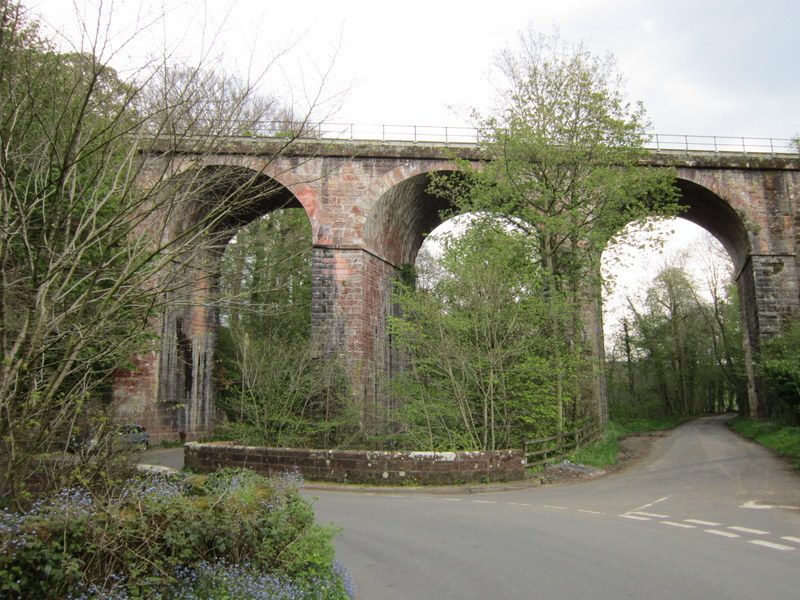
- Coordinates: 54.9085°N 2.731°W
- Carries: Tyne Valley line
- Crosses: River Gelt
- Locale: Carlisle, England
- Maintained by: Network Rail
- Heritage status: Grade II* listed building

Characteristics
- Material: Red sandstone
- Height: 60 ft
- No. of spans: 3

History
- Constructed by: Francis Giles
- Construction start: 1832
- Construction end: 1835

Location
- Interactive map of Gelt Bridge

The Gelt Bridge or Gelt Viaduct (also known as Middle Gelt Bridge) is a skew arch railway viaduct in the parish of Hayton, east of Carlisle in Cumbria, north west England. Built from 1832, it is one of the earliest and largest skew bridges in Britain. It is a Grade II* listed building.

== Background ==
The idea of linking Newcastle upon Tyne on England's east coast with Carlisle on the west dates back to at least the 1770s, when proposals were tabled for a canal. The prospectus for the Newcastle and Carlisle Railway was published in 1825 and construction work began in 1829 under the supervision of Francis Giles. The line was one of the earliest mainline railways and Britain's first major east-west line.

Giles was the consulting engineer for the entire line but was also directly responsible for the principal works at the western end, which presented some of the greatest engineering challenges on the route, including the Gelt Bridge and the Corby Bridge (or Wetheral Viaduct) and Corby Viaduct some five miles closer to Carlisle.

== Design ==
The bridge consists of three skew arches, each with a span of 30 feet (9 metres), standing on two rusticated pillars. It carries the railway 60 feet (18 metres) over the River Gelt in a deep but narrow gorge. The bridge has a skew angle of 27 degrees. It is built from rusticated red sandstone, with smoothed voussoirs and V-shaped joints. An iron railing forms the bridge parapet. A plaque is built into each of the abutments; one reads "Gelt Bridge: Francis Giles Engineer, John McKay Builder, MDCCCXXXII; MDCCCXXXV"; The other has the same inscription in Latin.

== History ==
The bridge was designed by Francis Giles, engineer to the Newcastle and Carlisle Railway, and built by the contractor, John McKay. Construction began in 1832 and the bridge was completed by 1835, making it one of the earliest railway skew bridges and one of the largest of its era. The viaduct is still in use, carrying the modern Tyne Valley line. It is a grade II* listed building.

== See also ==
- Grade II* listed buildings in Cumberland
- Listed buildings in Hayton, Carlisle
