= Holme Eden Abbey =

Building in Cumbria, England

Coordinates: 54.904928°N 2.825383°W

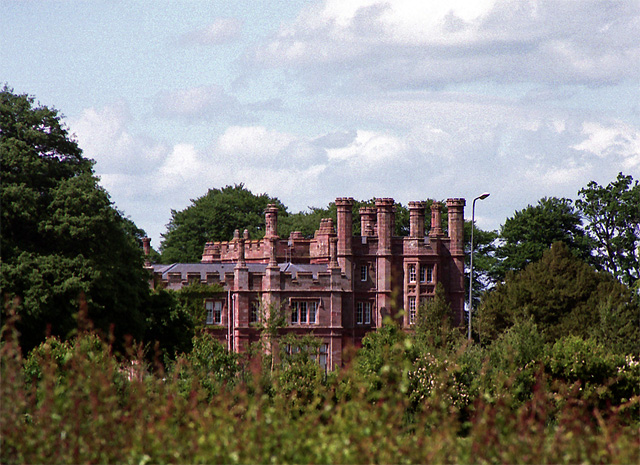
Holme Eden Abbey

Holme Eden Abbey is a house built on the site of an abbey in Cumbria, England. The current building (built 1833–37) is a Grade II* listed building.

== History ==
It was designed in 1833 by John Dobson of Newcastle for a Peter Dixon (a cotton mill owner at Warwick Bridge). It is said to have seven entrances, 52 chimney pots and 365 windows in the manner of a Calendar house. In 1875 it was sold to a Wiliam Watson.

From 1921 until 1983 it served as an abbey to Benedictine nuns. It then served as an exclusive old persons home before being converted into an award-winning development of twelve apartments. The old walled garden was developed with homes built inside it.

Sir Maurice Douglas Warburton Elphinstone died here on 5 December 1995.

== See also ==
- Grade II* listed buildings in Cumberland
- Listed buildings in Wetheral
