= Aglionby, Cumbria =

Village in Cumbria, England

Coordinates: 54.89°N 2.87°W

Aglionby
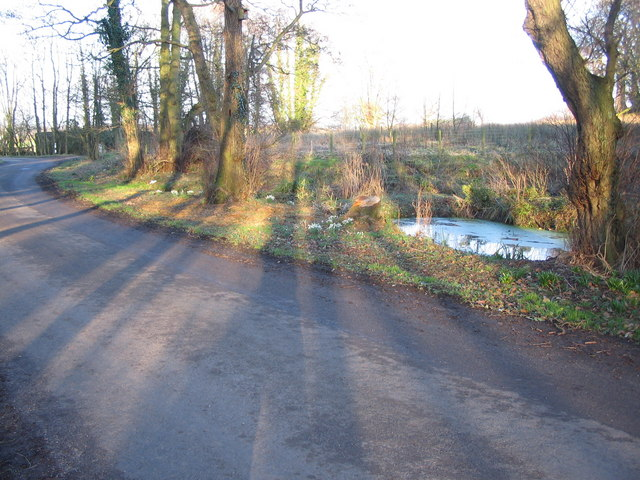
- Pond at Aglionby

- Location in the former Carlisle district, Cumbria Location within Cumbria
- OS grid reference: NY4456
- Civil parish: Wetheral
- Unitary authority: Cumberland
- Ceremonial county: Cumbria
- Region: North West
- Country: England
- Sovereign state: United Kingdom
- Post town: CARLISLE
- Postcode district: CA4
- Dialling code: 01228
- Police: Cumbria
- Fire: Cumbria
- Ambulance: North West
- UK Parliament: Carlisle

Aglionby is a village in Cumbria, England.

Aglionby lies within the civil parish of Wetheral and thus forms part of the district administered as the Cumberland. Aglionby is made up of Rosegate, The Strand, Broomy Hill and Manor Croft. Whooff House resides just off the Aglionby road end. Carlisle Golf Course is a stone's throw across the road. In the Imperial Gazetteer of England and Wales of 1870-72 it had a population of 119.

== See also ==
- Listed buildings in Wetheral
