= Corby Castle =

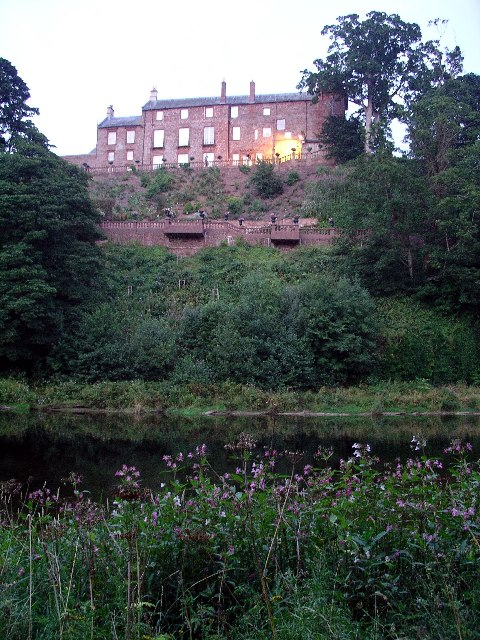
- Corby Castle with the River Eden in the foreground, 2003

- Location within Cumbria
- 54°52′47″N 2°49′35″W
- Type: Tower House, developed into a Country House
- Location: Great Corby

Site notes
- Area: Cumbria
- Architect: Peter Nicholson
- Architectural styles: Medieval and Georgian

Listed Building – Grade I
- Official name: Corby Castle
- Designated: 1 April 1957
- Reference no.: 1087717

Listed Building – Grade I
- Official name: Cascade to West of Corby Castle
- Designated: 1 April 1957
- Reference no.: 1335535

Listed Building – Grade I
- Official name: Salmon Coops to South of Corby Castle
- Designated: 1 April 1957
- Reference no.: 1087677

Listed Building – Grade I
- Official name: Wall and Gatepiers to East of Corby Castle
- Designated: 1 April 1957
- Reference no.: 1087674

National Register of Historic Parks and Gardens
- Official name: Corby Castle
- Designated: 1 July 1985
- Reference no.: 1000662

Corby Castle is a Grade I listed building and ancestral home of a cadet branch of the prominent Howard family situated on the southern edge of the village of Great Corby in northern Cumbria, England.

== History ==
It was originally built in the 13th century, as a red sandstone tower house by the Salkeld Family, who also owned the nearby Salkeld Hall of similar age. It was sold in 1611 to Lord William Howard (1563–1640), the third son of Thomas Howard, 4th Duke of Norfolk, who added a two-storied L-shaped house onto the peel tower. Henry Howard (1757–1842) inherited the estate from Sir Francis Howard, Lord William Howard's second son. The present façade was built for Henry by Peter Nicholson between April 1812 and September 1817.

In 1981 the castle was used as a location for the filming of a five-part BBC dramatisation of Wilkie Collins' The Woman in White. Robert Martin and Ian Yeates started a glassworks in the grounds of Corby Castle in 1986.

Corby Castle was sold by Sir John Howard-Lawson Bt. and Lady Howard-Lawson in 1994 to Edward Haughey, Baron Ballyedmond, a businessman and Ulster Unionist Party life peer. The principal contents of the castle were sold in 1994 through Phillips of Scotland. Lord Ballyedmond carried out a total refurbishment of the castle, using it for both family and corporate entertainment. After his death in a helicopter crash in 2014 the castle was put up for sale by his estate in 2024, with an asking price of £15 million.

== Historic listing designations ==
Corby Castle is a Grade I listed building, the highest grade. The estate has a number of other Grade I listed structures including: the eastern gate lodge and its walls and gate piers; the cascade which descends to the River Eden, a dovecote; a walled kitchen garden; a set of salmon coops; a small garden temple known as The Tempietto. and a set of caves, known as St Constantine's Cells, believed to have been excavated in medieval times by the monks of Wetheral Priory. A statue of St Constantine was added to the grounds to commemorate the cells by Philip Howard in 1843. It is a Grade II listed structure. A statue of Polyphemus is listed at Grade II*. The estate itself is listed at Grade I on the Register of Historic Parks and Gardens of Special Historic Interest in England.

== Gallery ==
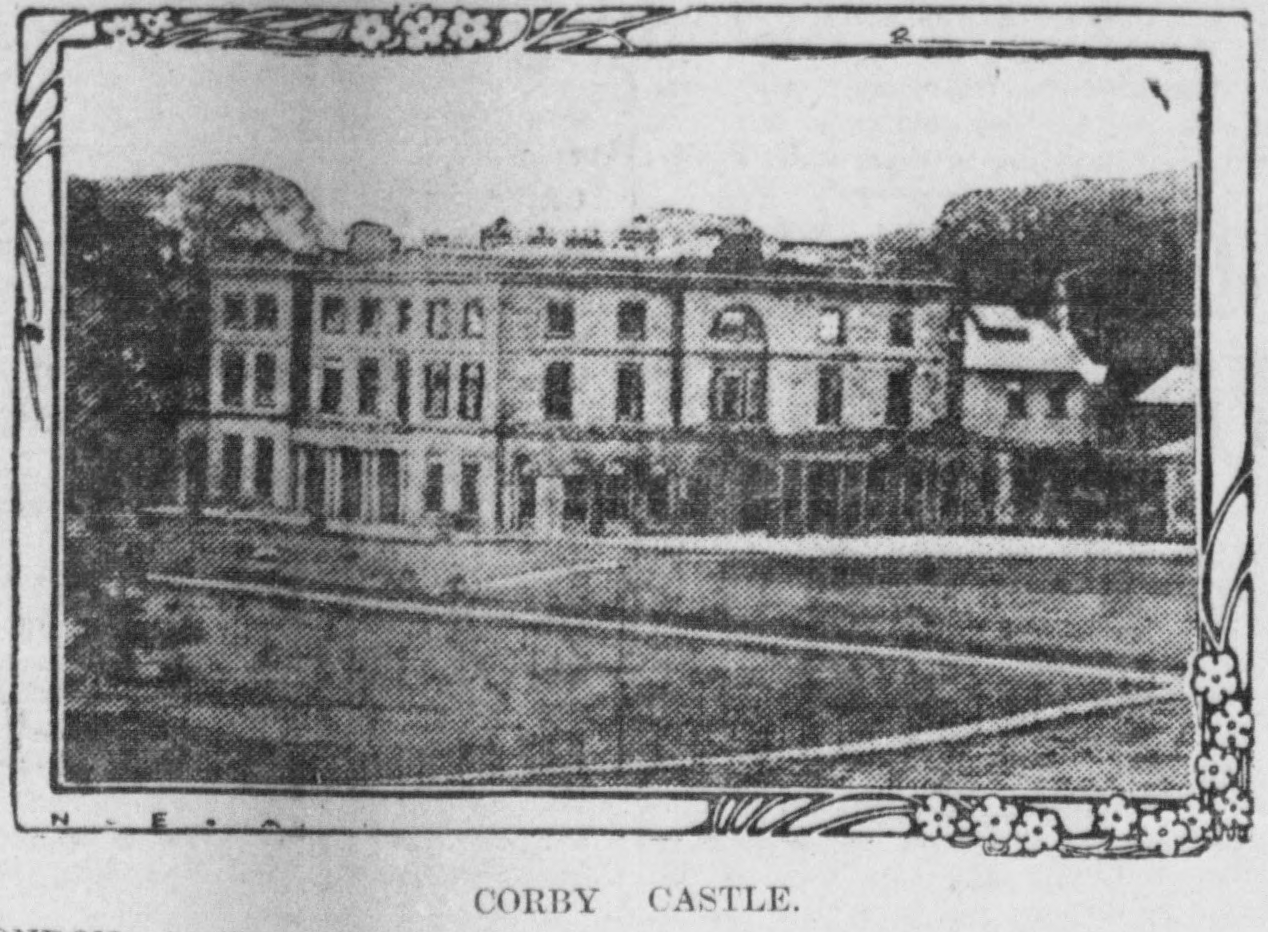
The castle, circa 1904

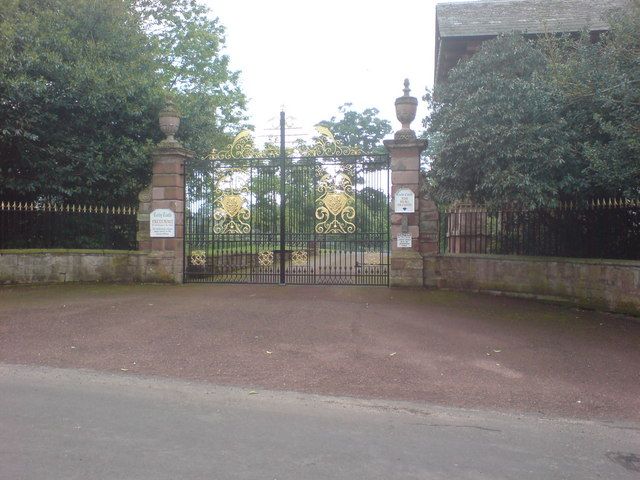
The castle gates, with the lodge visible to the right

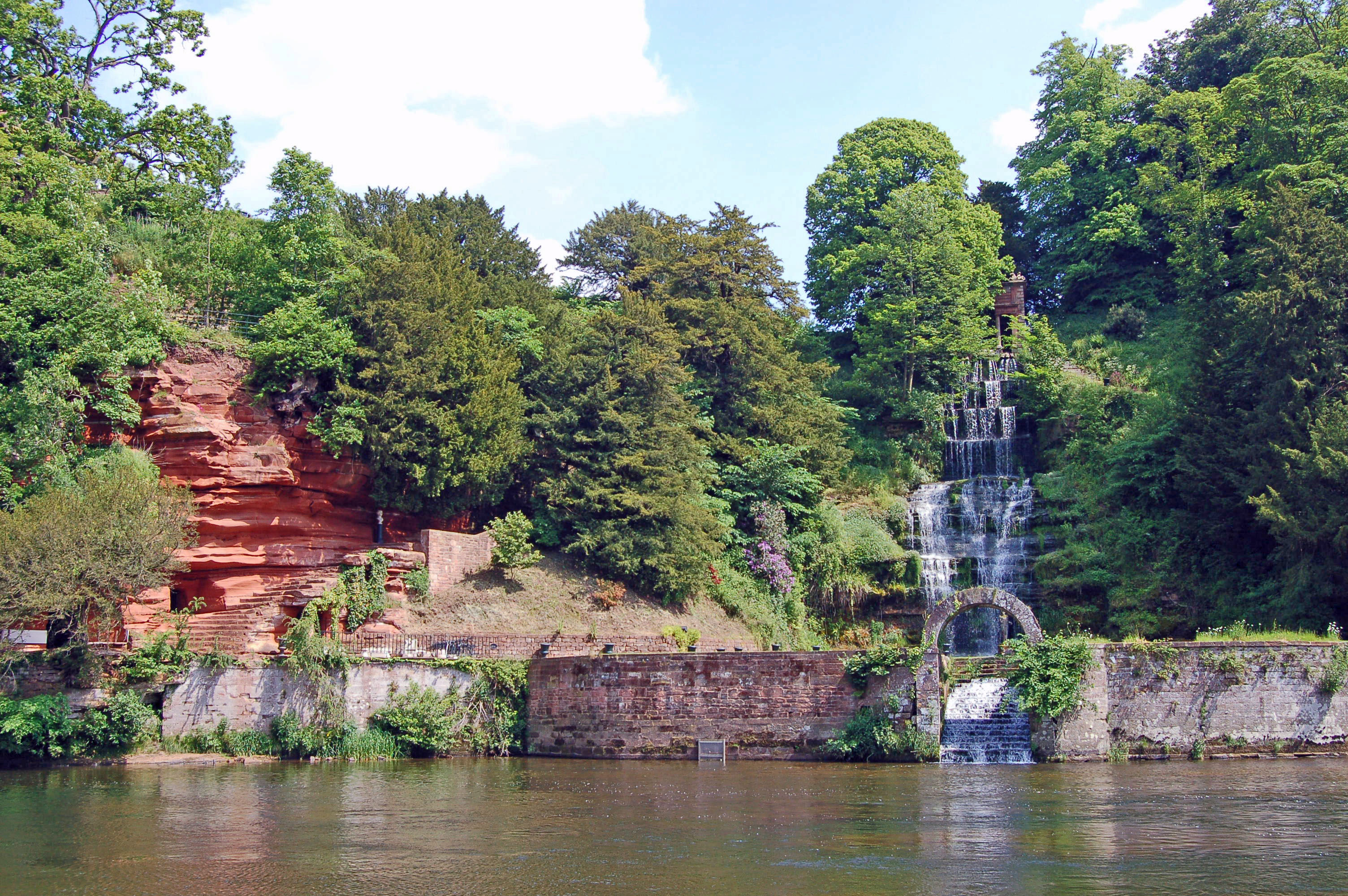
The cascade

== See also ==
- Grade I listed buildings in Cumbria
- Listed buildings in Wetheral
