= Wetheral railway station =

Railway station in Cumbria, England

Wetheral
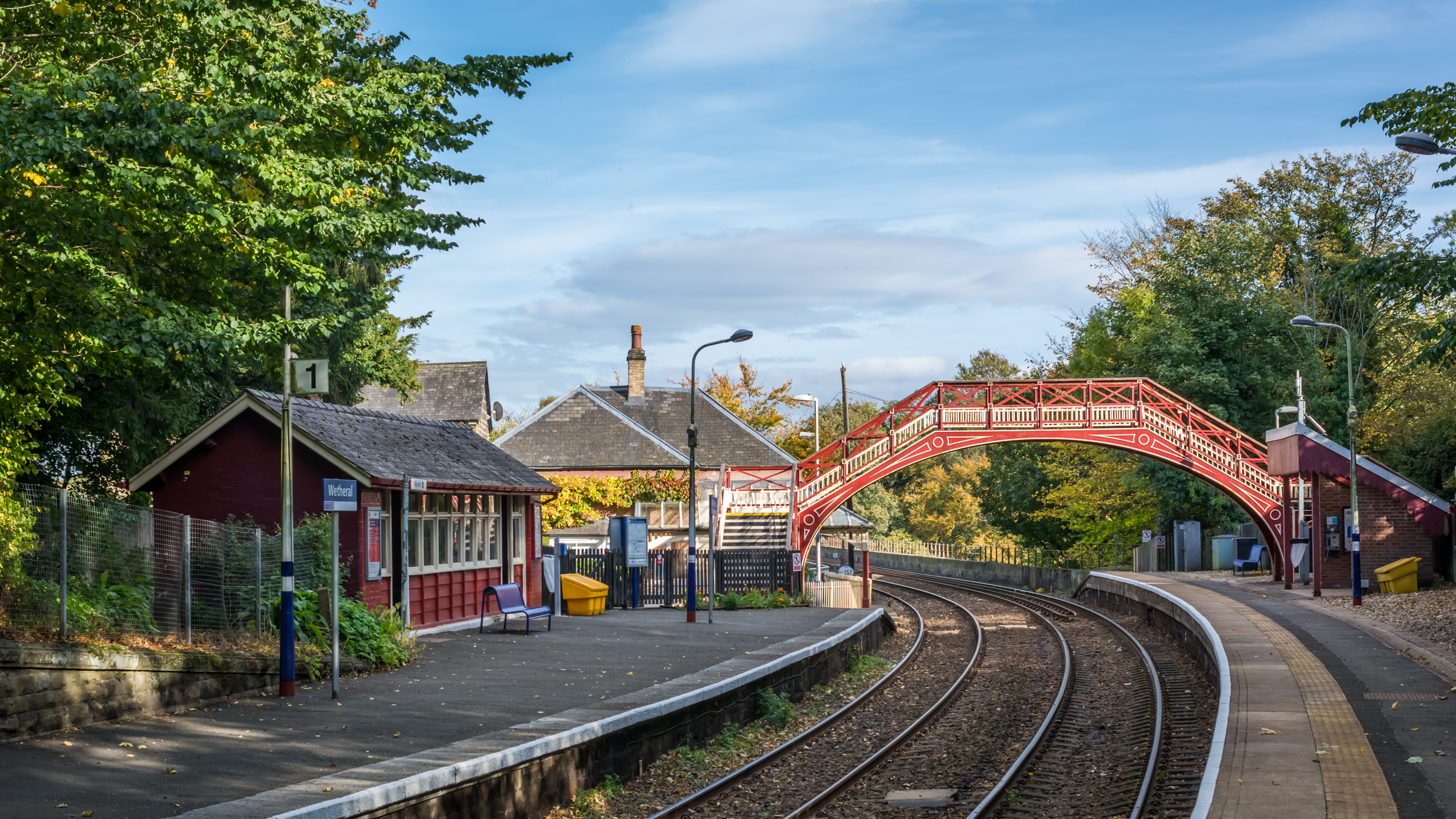

General information
- Location: Wetheral, Cumberland; England
- Coordinates: 54°53′01″N 2°49′55″W
- Grid reference: NY467546
- Owner: Network Rail
- Manager: Northern Trains
- Platforms: 2
- Tracks: 2

Other information
- Station code: WRL
- Classification: DfT category F2

History
- Original company: Newcastle and Carlisle Railway
- Pre-grouping: North Eastern Railway
- Post-grouping: London and North Eastern Railway; British Rail (North Eastern Region)

Key dates
- 19 July 1836: Opened
- 2 January 1967: Closed
- 5 October 1981: Reopened

Passengers
- 2021/22: ▲31,348
- 2022/23: ▼30,666
- 2023/24: ▲44,644
- 2024/25: ▲50,658
- 2025/26: ▲60,836
Location
- Location within the former City of Carlisle district Location within Cumbria
Notes
- Passenger statistics from the Office of Rail and Road

Wetheral is a railway station on the Tyne Valley Line, which runs between Newcastle and Carlisle via Hexham. The station, situated 4 miles 7 chains (4.09 mi; 6.58 km) east of Carlisle, serves the villages of Great Corby and Wetheral in the Cumberland district, Cumbria, England. It is owned by Network Rail and managed by Northern Trains.

== History ==
The Newcastle and Carlisle Railway was formed in 1829, and was opened in stages. The station was opened in July 1836, following the opening of the Newcastle and Carlisle Railway between Greenhead and Carlisle London Road.

Corby Bridge (also known as Wetheral Viaduct) is situated to the east of the station, over which trains pass when travelling towards Newcastle. Construction of the 660-foot (200 m)-long bridge began in 1830, and was completed in 1834. It also carries a cast iron footbridge that links the station with the nearby village of Great Corby, which was added in 1851.

The station was originally staffed, and the old stationmaster's house still stands as a private residence. Following the Beeching Axe, the station was closed in January 1967, along with the neighbouring station at Heads Nook.

Wetheral was formally re-opened by British Rail on 5 October 1981. The reopening followed the construction of new housing estate and lobbying by the local parish council. Although the original platforms were still in situ, the station building had to be made safe and refurbished for passengers. The works were funded by Cumbria County Council which also sponsored a scheme by Manpower Services Commission to complete the work in time for reopening.

== Facilities ==
The station has two platforms, both of which have a ticket machine (which accepts card or contactless payment only), seating, waiting shelter, next train audio and visual displays and an emergency help point. There is step-free access to both platforms, with both platforms also being linked by a pre-grouping metal footbridge, similar to those at Brampton (Cumbria) and Haltwhistle. There is a small car park at the station.

Wetheral is part of the Northern Trains penalty fare network, meaning that a valid ticket or promise to pay notice is required prior to boarding the train.

== Services ==
As of the December 2024 timetable change, there is an hourly service between Newcastle and Carlisle via Hexham, with additional trains at peak times. On Sundays, an hourly service operates, but starts later in the morning. All services are operated by Northern Trains.

Rolling stock used: Class 156 Super Sprinter and Class 158 Express Sprinter

Preceding station	National Rail	Following station
Brampton towards Newcastle	Northern Trains; Tyne Valley Line	Carlisle towards Carlisle
	Historical railways	
Heads Nook	North Eastern Railway; Newcastle and Carlisle Railway	Scotby
