= Wetheral =

Coordinates: 54.88°N 2.83°W

- Village and parish
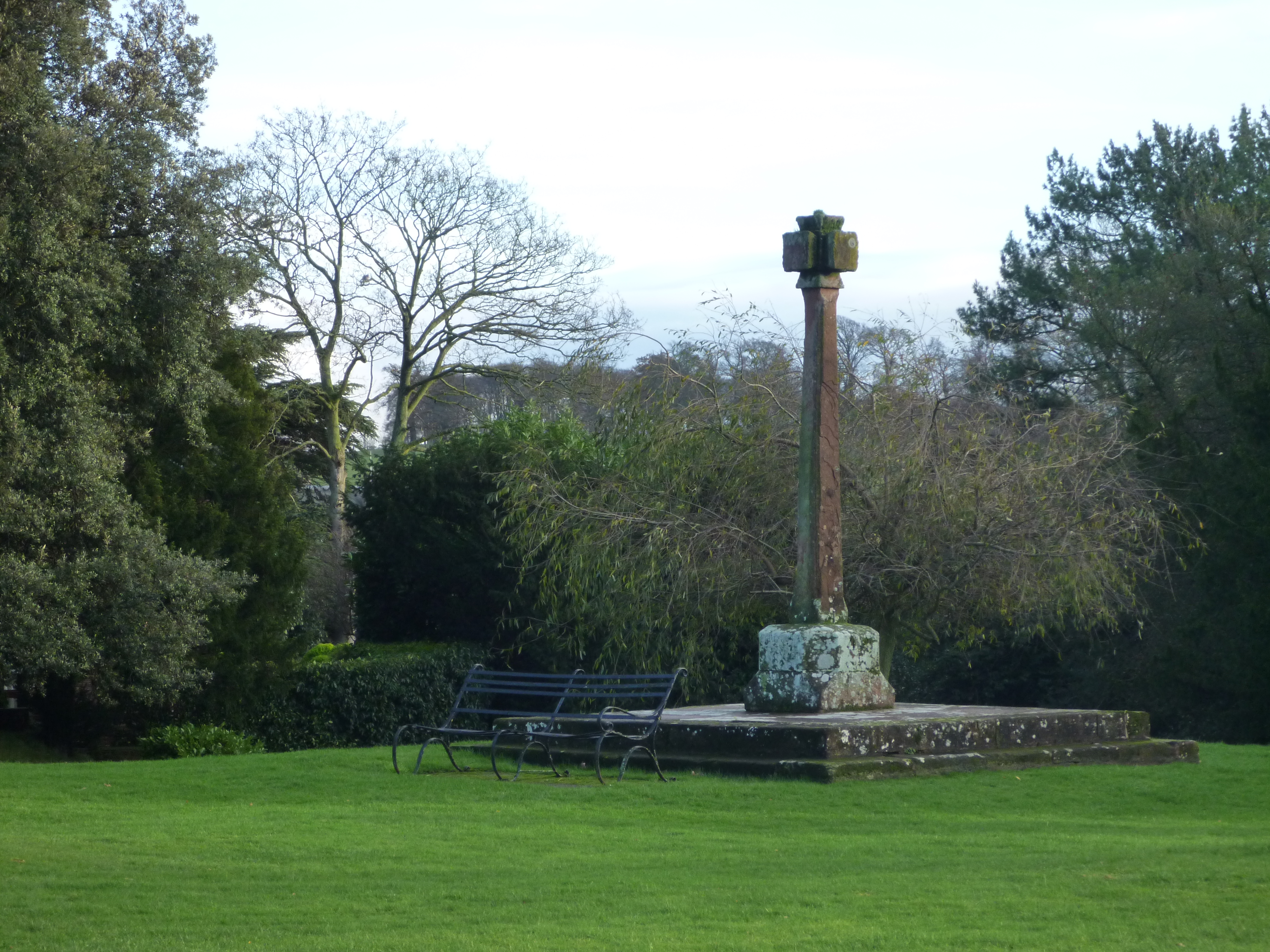
- The Cross, Wetheral Village Green

- Location within Cumbria
- Population: 6,293 (2021 census)
- OS grid reference: NY4654
- Civil parish: Wetheral
- Unitary authority: Cumberland
- Ceremonial county: Cumbria
- Region: North West
- Country: England
- Sovereign state: United Kingdom
- Post town: Carlisle
- Postcode district: CA4
- Dialling code: 01228
- Police: Cumbria
- Fire: Cumbria
- Ambulance: North West
- UK Parliament: Carlisle

Wetheral is a village, civil parish and electoral ward in the Cumberland district of the ceremonial county of Cumbria, England. The parish, which includes the villages and hamlets of Warwick-on-Eden, Aglionby, Scotby, Cotehill, Cumwhinton, Great Corby and Warwick Bridge, had a population of 6,293 people in 2,821 households at the 2021 census.

== History ==
The place-name Wetheral is first attested in the Register of Wetheral Priory circa 1100 AD, where it appears as Wetherhala. The name means 'the haugh (area of flat land by a river) where wethers (castrated male sheep) were kept'.

In the Middle Ages there was a priory at Wetheral. All that is left now is Wetheral Priory Gatehouse, which is in the care of English Heritage, and some low ruined walls behind the farm buildings that now occupy the site.

World war one ambulance driver and nurse Pat Waddell was born near here at Warwick Bridge and Nursing education theorist Nancy Roper was born in Wetheral in 1918. She trained in Cumberland Infirmary, Carlisle, and went on to develop the nursing process based on Activities of Daily Living (Roper -Logan - Tierney method) used across the UK and beyond.

== Geography ==
Wetheral stands high on a bank overlooking a gorge in the River Eden. Parts of the riverbank here are surrounded by ancient woodlands, including Wetheral Woods, owned by the National Trust. Formerly a small ferryboat operated to the village of Great Corby on the opposite bank, and an iron ring can still be found attached to the rocks on the Great Corby side of the river where the ferry would tie up.

The ward of Wetheral includes the villages and hamlets of Warwick-on-Eden, Aglionby, Scotby, Cotehill, Cumwhinton, Wetheral Shield and Wetheral Pasture. The civil parish also includes part of the Great Corby & Geltsdale ward, namely the villages of Great Corby, and Warwick Bridge (but not Corby Hill or Little Corby).

At the historic core of the village lies the village green, in one corner of which stands Wetheral Cross. The steps were the base of a maypole erected in the centre of the green at the expense of Henry Howard in 1814. For some reason, in 1838 to 1844, the steps were moved to the current location and the cross added. It is not a market cross as Wetheral was not a market town. The head of the cross appears much older than the shaft and this may possibly be on the site of a medieval cross. The green is surrounded by large period houses in different styles, and the Fantails restaurant, shop and tea room front the green. The church, hotel (the Crown), village hall, hairdresser and pub (the Wheatsheaf) are not far away. The north-western part of the village is known as Wetheral Plain and consists of a ribbon development along Plains Road and the housing estates of Greenacres and Faustin Hill.

At Wetheral Shield is the Animals' Refuge, operated by the National Equine (and Smaller Animals) Defence League.

== Governance ==
As a civil parish, Wetheral has a parish council of 12 elected members.

For local government purposes, Wetheral is in the Cumberland unitary authority area. For elections to Cumberland Council, Wetheral is an electoral ward, but from 2027 it will be part of the new electoral ward of Wetheral & Scotby. Historically, Wetheral was in Carlisle Rural District from 1894 to 1934, and then Border Rural District until 1974, both in the administrative county of Cumberland. From 1974, it was part of the City of Carlisle district in the new county of Cumbria, until 2023, when the present Cumberland unitary district was created.

== Demographics ==
Census population of Wetheral parish
Census	Population	Female	Male	Households	Source
2001	5,203	2,696	2,507	2,168	
2011	5,771	3,010	2,761	2,564	
2021	6,293	3,250	3,043	2,821	

At the 2001 census, the population of the Wetheral electoral ward was 4,039,

== Landmarks ==
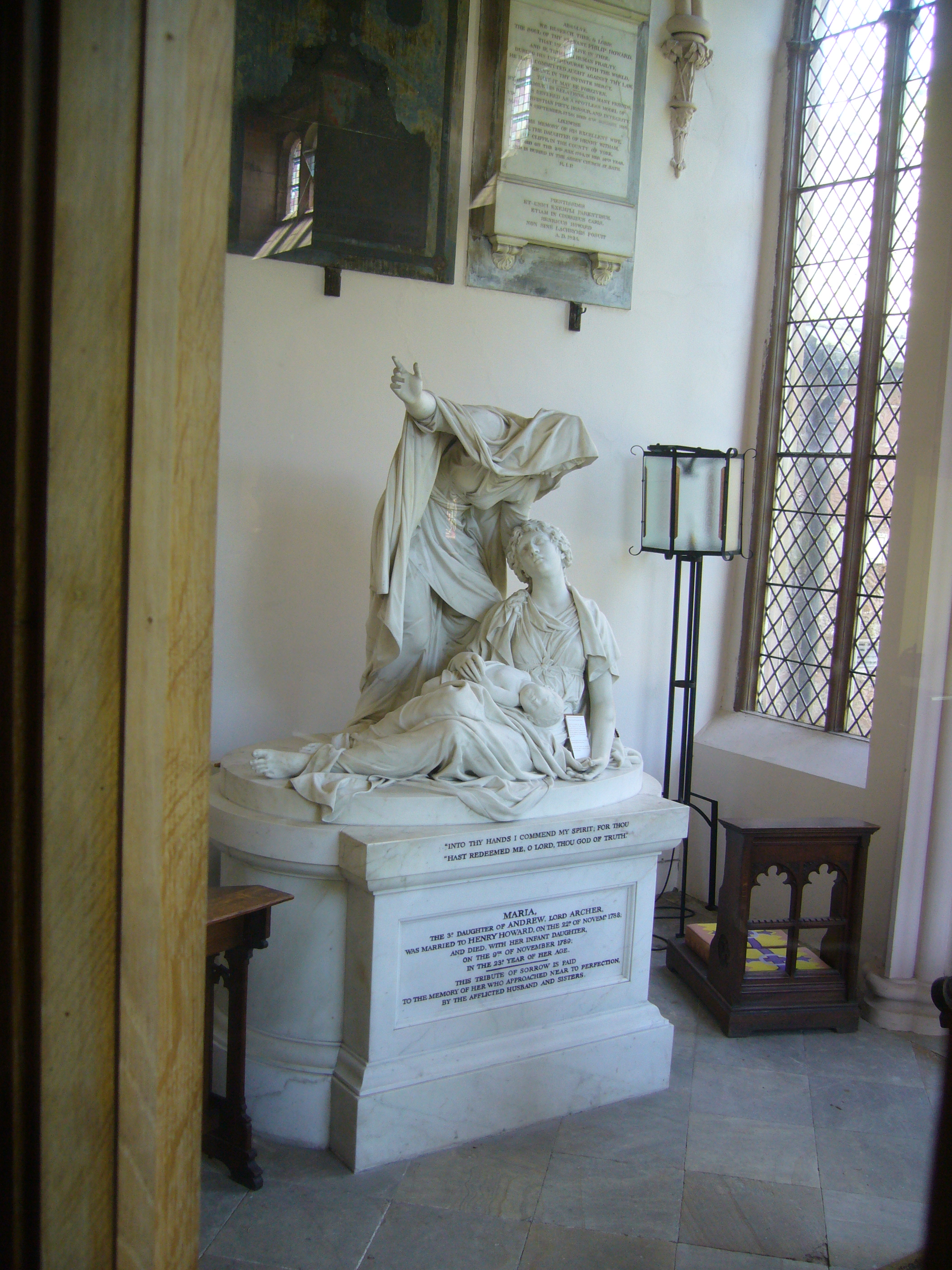
Parish Church: Joseph Nollekens' life-size sculpture of 'Faith' in memory of Henry Howard's wife Maria (who died in childbirth).

Wetheral Parish Church is dedicated to the Holy Trinity and St Constantine. St Constantine was said to be a Scottish king who relinquished his throne to become a monk. Legend has it that he lived as a hermit in a cave at Wetheral., which can be reached by walking down the River Eden. The current rector is based at The Rectory in Warwick Bridge. The church contains a life-size sculpture by Joseph Nollekens of 'Faith'. This was commissioned by Henry Howard after the death, in childbirth, of his wife Maria. The cost of the sculpture was £1,500 in the late eighteenth century, which is estimated to be equivalent to nearly £2 million today.

== Transport ==
Wetheral railway station is on the Tyne Valley Line between Newcastle and Carlisle. It is at the west end of Corby Bridge (popularly known as 'Wetheral Viaduct') over the Eden, which acts also as a footbridge connecting with Great Corby. The station was closed during the Beeching cuts in 1967, but was reopened in 1981. The Wetheral train accident 1836 was one of the very earliest rail accidents, and happened close to the station.

== Education ==
There is no school in the village (it closed many years ago) and most primary school children travel to the school at Scotby, although some go to Great Corby or Warwick Bridge. The village lies in the catchment area of the Richard Rose Central Academy in Carlisle, although the William Howard School in nearby Brampton provides a bus service for pupils who wish to attend school there. This is undertaken by most pupils despite having to pay a fee for the service rather than using the free bus to the catchment school.

== See also ==
- Listed buildings in Wetheral
