= Great Corby =

Village in Cumbria, England

Coordinates: 54.88°N 2.82°W

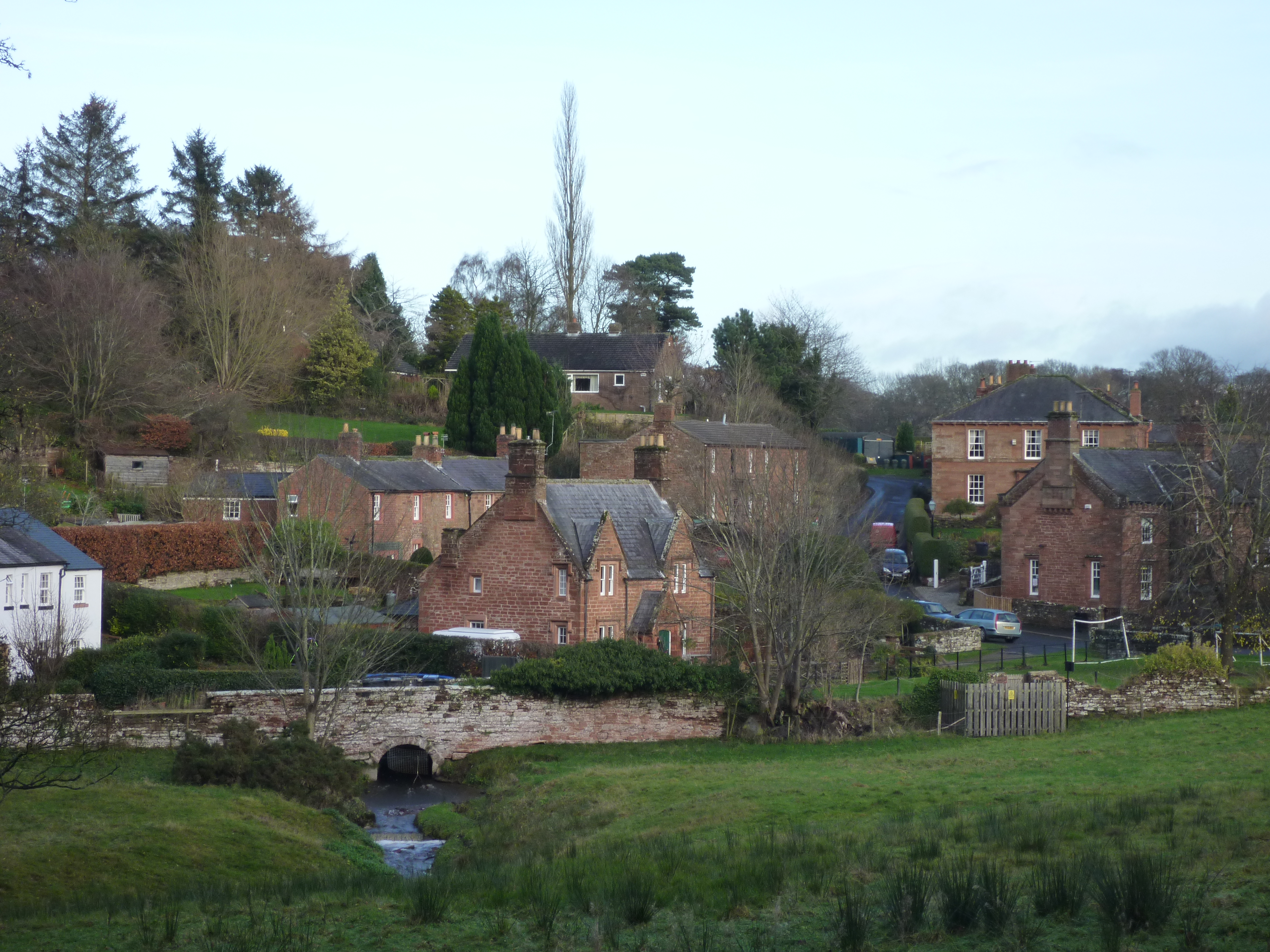
- The lower village green, including primary school, Great Corby

- Location in the formner Carlisle district, Cumbria Location within Cumbria
- Population: 2,157 (2011)
- OS grid reference: NY4754
- Civil parish: Wetheral
- Unitary authority: Cumberland
- Ceremonial county: Cumbria
- Region: North West
- Country: England
- Sovereign state: United Kingdom
- Post town: CARLISLE
- Postcode district: CA4
- Dialling code: 01228
- Police: Cumbria
- Fire: Cumbria
- Ambulance: North West
- UK Parliament: Carlisle

Great Corby is a village in northern Cumbria, England, above the eastern bank of a wooded gorge on the River Eden. Directly across the river from Great Corby is the village of Wetheral. The two villages are linked by a railway viaduct (Corby Bridge, popularly known as "Wetheral Viaduct"). This is on the Tyne Valley Line from Newcastle to Carlisle, which passes to the north of the village. The railway station at Wetheral is accessible to residents of Great Corby by a pedestrian footpath attached to the railway viaduct.

Administratively Great Corby lies within the civil parish of Wetheral and the electoral ward of Great Corby and Geltsdale. It thus forms part of the district administered as Cumberland. Women in the ward had the highest life expectancy at birth, 97.2 years, of any ward in England and Wales in 2016.

Early in 2015, the Corby Bridge Inn, beside the level crossing on the railway at the northern entrance to the village, closed after being sold to a property developer. The pub, a Grade II Listed Building, was built in the 1830s to serve the needs of travellers on the new railway, and was thought to be the oldest 'railway' pub in the world.

There is also a primary school. There is no church, the village forming part of Wetheral parish. The village's Methodist chapel closed in the mid 80's, and the building is now a private house.

Great Corby is notable for Corby Castle, a historic home of the Howard family on the south-western edge of the village overlooking the river. Corby Castle is now owned by the family of Northern Irish businessman Edward Haughey.

In 1836 one of the very earliest railway accidents happened in Corby Bridge, close to the railway viaduct.

Within the village many sporting events occur largely due to the effort of the Great Corby Cricket Club. They recently merged forces with Scotby CC meaning the sides altogether now have two senior teams and two junior sides. There are around 50 junior and 40 senior members within the club which is run by enthusiastic members who are looking to improve facilities and opportunities for the local cricket side.

== See also ==
- Listed buildings in Wetheral
