= Lists of churches in England =

Lists of churches in England include lists of notable current or former church buildings, territories, places of worship, or congregations, and may be discriminated by various criteria, including affiliation, location, or architectural characteristics.

These include:

== By denomination ==
- List of Anglo-Catholic churches in England
- List of Methodist churches in England
- List of Presbyterian churches in England

== By region ==
- List of churches in Allerdale
- List of churches in Bristol
- List of churches in Cambridge
- List of churches in Cambridgeshire
- List of churches in the City of Carlisle
- List of churches in Cheshire
- List of churches preserved by the Churches Conservation Trust in Southeast England
- List of churches preserved by the Churches Conservation Trust in Southwest England
- List of churches preserved by the Churches Conservation Trust in the East of England
- List of churches preserved by the Churches Conservation Trust in the English Midlands
- List of churches in Cornwall
- List of Commissioners' churches in eastern England
- List of Commissioners' churches in London
- List of Commissioners' churches in Northeast and Northwest England
- List of Commissioners' churches in southwest England
- List of Commissioners' churches in the English Midlands
- List of Commissioners' churches in Wales
- List of Commissioners' churches in Yorkshire
- List of churches in Copeland
- List of churches in Cumbria
- List of churches in East Cambridgeshire
- List of churches in Eden District
- List of English abbeys, priories and friaries serving as parish churches
- List of churches in Exeter
- List of churches in Fenland
- Friends of Friendless Churches
- List of churches in Gloucestershire
- List of churches in Greater Manchester
- List of churches in Hampshire
- List of churches in Hartlepool
- List of churches in Huntingdonshire
- List of churches in Kent
- List of churches in Lincolnshire
- List of churches in the Anglican Diocese of Leeds
- List of churches in the Diocese of Carlisle
- List of Roman Catholic churches in Leicester
- List of churches in London
- List of demolished churches in the City of London
- List of churches destroyed in the Great Fire of London and not rebuilt
- List of churches in Luton
- List of churches in Mid Devon
- List of churches in North Devon
- List of churches in Norwich
- List of churches in Oxford
- List of churches in Peterborough
- List of churches in Plymouth
- List of churches in Rutland
- List of parishes in the Diocese of Salford
- List of churches in South Cambridgeshire
- List of churches in South Hams
- List of churches in South Lakeland
- List of churches in Teignbridge
- List of Church of England churches in Thurrock
- List of churches in Torbay
- List of churches in Torridge
- List of churches in West Devon
- List of Christopher Wren churches in London
- Medieval parish churches of York

== By architect or architectural style ==
- List of collegiate churches in England
- List of church restorations, amendments and furniture by John Douglas
- List of new churches by Temple Moore
- List of new churches by Thomas Rickman
- List of new ecclesiastical buildings by J. L. Pearson
- List of new churches by Anthony Salvin
- List of church restorations and alterations by Anthony Salvin
- List of new churches by George Gilbert Scott in London
- List of new churches by George Gilbert Scott in Northern England
- List of new churches by George Gilbert Scott in South East England
- List of new churches by George Gilbert Scott in South West England
- List of new churches by George Gilbert Scott in the East of England
- List of new churches by George Gilbert Scott in the English Midlands
- List of new churches by G. E. Street
- List of ecclesiastical works by Alfred Waterhouse

== Places of worship ==
- List of places of worship in Barrow-in-Furness
- List of places of worship in Brighton and Hove
- List of current places of worship in Chichester District
- List of former places of worship in Chichester District
- List of demolished places of worship in East Sussex
- List of places of worship in Eastbourne
- List of places of worship in Epsom and Ewell
- List of places of worship in the Borough of Guildford
- List of places of worship in Hastings
- List of current places of worship on the Isle of Wight
- List of places of worship in the City of Leeds
- List of places of worship in Lewes District
- Places of worship in the City of Milton Keynes
- List of places of worship in Mole Valley
- List of places of worship in Sevenoaks District
- List of places of worship in Tandridge District
- List of places of worship in Tonbridge and Malling
- List of places of worship in Tunbridge Wells (borough)
- List of places of worship in Waverley (borough)
- List of current places of worship in Wealden
- List of former places of worship in Wealden
- List of demolished places of worship in West Sussex
- List of places of worship in Woking (borough)
- List of places of worship in Worthing
