= List of works by George Gilbert Scott =

George Gilbert Scott (1811–78) was an English architect.

Lists of his works can be found at:

- List of new churches by George Gilbert Scott in the East of England
- List of new churches by George Gilbert Scott in the English Midlands
- List of new churches by George Gilbert Scott in London
- List of new churches by George Gilbert Scott in Northern England
- List of new churches by George Gilbert Scott in South East England
- List of new churches by George Gilbert Scott in South West England
