= List of churches in Exeter =

The following is a list of churches in Exeter, England.

== Active churches ==
The city has an estimated 64 churches for 129,800 inhabitants, a ratio of one church to every 2,028 people.

Name	Ward	Web	Dedication	Founded	Denomination	Benefice	Notes
New Hope Baptist Church	Exwick	https://www.newhopebaptist.co.uk/		1993	Independent Baptist		Formerly "Riverside Baptist Church"
St Andrew, Exeter	Alphington		Andrew		Church of England	West Exe Ministry Team	
St Michael & All Angels, Alphington	Alphington		Michael & Angels	Medieval	Church of England	Shillingford, Alphington, Ide	
Westgate Christian Fellowship	City Centre	http://westgatechristianfellowship.org.uk			Independent Evangelical		
St Sidwell, Exeter	Duryard & St James		Sidwell	Medieval	Church of England	SS Matthew, Mark, Sidwell	
Sidwell Street Methodist Church	Duryard & St James			1830s	Methodist	Exeter, Coast & Country Circ	Current building 1896
Exeter Seventh-Day Adventist Church	Duryard & St James				7th-Day Adventist		
Calvary Exeter	Duryard & St James	https://calvaryexeter.co.uk/	Jesus	2008	Non-Denominational		Recently planted to Plymouth
Beacon Heath Church	Beacon Heath	https://www.beaconheathchurch.org.uk/		1961	Independent Evangelical		
Mary Harris Memorial Chapel, Exeter Uni	Duryard & St James		Trinity	1958			
St Andrew, Exwick	Exwick		Andrew	1841-1842	Church of England		
Exwick Community Church	Exwick			1993	Baptist Union		Plant from St Thomas Baptist, independent 1996. Affiliated to BU
St Michael & All Angels, Heavitree	Heavitree		Michael & Angels	Medieval	Church of England	Heavitree Parish	
Blessed Sacrament, Heavitree	Heavitree		Blessed Sacrament	1931-1932	Roman Catholic		
Heavitree United Reformed Church	Heavitree				URC		
Exeter Independent Evangelical Church	Heavitree			1999	Independent		Reformed and Baptist. Meets in Heavitree Evangelical Church
City Community Church Exeter	Heavitree				Independent		
St Boniface, Exeter	Mincinglake & Whipton		Boniface	1958	Church of England		
Whipton Chapel	Mincinglake & Whipton				Gospel Hall		
Isca Church	Beacon Heath			1960s	Synergy		Meets at the Beacon Community Centre and online
St Matthew, Exeter	Newtown & St Leonard's		Matthew	1882	Church of England	SS Matthew, Mark, Sidwell	
St Leonard, Exeter	Newtown & St Leonard's		Leonard of Noblac	Medieval	Church of England		Conservative evangelical. Rebuilt 1833, 1876
Exeter Network Church	Newtown & St Leonard's			2005	Church of England		2005 plant by Bishop's Mission Order. Meets in Maynard School
Chapel of St Luke, St Luke's College	Newtown & St Leonard's		Luke	1863	Church of England		St Luke's College chapel. Rebuilt 1952 after bombing
Christ Church, Exeter	Newtown & St Leonard's	https://www.facebook.com/Christ-Church-Exeter-UK-104322978008132/	Jesus	1844			
Holy Prophet Elias, Exeter	Newtown & St Leonard's		Elijah	1980s	Greek Orthodox		
Belmont Chapel	Newtown & St Leonard's				Gospel Hall		
Exeter Vineyard Church	Newtown & St Leonard's			1995	Vineyard		Meets in St Leonard's Primary School
Grace Church Exeter	Newtown & St Leonard's			2003	Newfrontiers		Meets in Maynard School. Named Frontiers Church Exeter till 2014
Glory of God Parish Exeter	Newtown & St Leonard's				RCCG		
St James, Exeter	Pennsylvania		James	pre-WW2	Church of England		Rebuilt 1956 after bombing
St Mark, Exeter	Pennsylvania		Mark	1936	Church of England	SS Matthew, Mark, Sidwell	
Pinhoe Road Baptist Church	Pennsylvania			1933	Baptist Union		
Holy Trinity, Beacon Heath	Pinhoe		Trinity		Church of England		Daughter church of St Boniface's
St Michael & All Angels, Pinhoe	Pinhoe		Michael & Angels	Medieval	Church of England	Clyst Mission Community	
Hall Church, Pinhoe	Pinhoe				Church of England	Clyst Mission Community	Services also held in the local school
Pinhoe United Reformed Church	Pinhoe				URC		
Maranatha Church Exeter	Pinhoe				Partners in Harvest		
St Luke, Countess Wear	Priory		Luke	1837	Church of England	Topsham & Wear	
Wonford Methodist Church	Priory				Methodist	Exeter, Coast & Country Circ	
St Peter's Cathedral, Exeter	St David's		Peter	Medieval	Church of England		Cathedral since 1050
St David, Exeter	St David's		David of Wales	Medieval	Church of England	SS David & Michael	Rebuilt 1816, burnt down 1890, rebuilt 1900
St Michael & All Angels, Mount Dinham	St David's		Michael & Angels	1865-1868	Church of England	SS David & Michael	Anglo-Catholic
St Pancras, Exeter	St David's		Pancras of Rome	Medieval	Church of England	Central Exeter	
St Stephen, Exeter	St David's		Stephen	Medieval	Church of England	Central Exeter	
St Mary Arches, Exeter	St David's		Mary	Medieval	Church of England	Central Exeter	
St Petrock, Exeter	St David's		Petroc	Medieval	Church of England	Central Exeter	
St Olave, Exeter	St David's		Olaf II of Norway	Medieval	Church of England	Central Exeter	
St Mary Steps, Exeter	St David's		Mary	Medieval	Church of England	Heavitree Parish	
Unlimited Church Exeter	St David's			2007	Church of England		Meets in St Mary Arches church. Bishop's Mission Order 2012
Sacred Heart, Exeter	St David's		Sacred Heart	1883-1884	Roman Catholic		
South Street Baptist Church Exeter	St David's			pre-1823	Baptist Union		Rebuilt 1823
The Mint Methodist Church	St David's			1813	Methodist	Exeter, Coast & Country Circ	
Southernhay United Reformed Church	St David's			C18th	URC		Current building 1868, rebuilt after WW2 bombing
Exeter Temple Salvation Army	St David's			1881	Salvation Army		
Exeter Quaker Meeting	St David's				Quakers		
Rediscover Church Exeter	St David's			1928	Elim		Renamed 2016. Planted to Plymouth 2011
City Life Church Exeter	St David's			2012	Independent		
St Lawrence, Exeter	St Loyes		Lawrence	post-WW2	Church of England	Heavitree Parish	Named after city centre St Lawrence's destroyed in WW2
Holy Trinity, Exeter	St Loyes		Trinity	2003	Church of England		Conservative evangelical. Plant from St Leonard's
St Thomas the Apostle, Exeter	St Thomas		Thomas	Medieval	Church of England		Anglo-Catholic
St Thomas Baptist Church	St Thomas			1940	Baptist Union		Moved to current site 1963. Plant from Bartholomew Baptist (closed)
St Thomas Methodist Church	St Thomas				Methodist	Exeter, Coast & Country Circ	
Riverside Church Exeter	St Thomas				Assemblies of God		
St Margaret, Topsham	Topsham		Margaret the Virgin	Medieval	Church of England	Topsham & Wear	
Holy Cross, Topsham	Topsham		Cross	1936-1937	Roman Catholic		
St Nicholas Methodist Church, Topsham	Topsham		Nicholas	1867	Methodist	Exeter, Coast & Country Circ	

== Defunct churches ==
Name	Ward	Ref	Dedication	Founded	Redundant	Denomination	Notes
Emmanuel, Exeter	Exwick		Jesus	1887	2014	Church of England	Permanent building 1895-1897. Now empty
St Clare Proprietary Chapel, Exeter	Heavitree		Clare?	Medieval		Church of England	
St Anne's Chapel, Blackboy Road	Newtown & St Leonard's		Anne	Medieval		Church of England	Building now used by an Orthodox church since 1980s
St Paul, Burnthouse Lane	Priory		Paul			Church of England	Demolished, plans afoot for rebuilding
All Hallows-on-the-Wall, Bartholomew Yard	St David's		All Saints	Medieval	C20th	Church of England	Demolished 1770, rebuilt 1845, demolished 1951
All Hallows, Goldsmith Street	St David's		All Saints	Medieval	1905	Church of England	Demolished
Holy Trinity, South Street	St David's		Trinity	Medieval	1969	Church of England	Rebuilt 1820. Now a club house
St Edmund, Exeter	St David's		Edmund the Martyr	Medieval	1956	Church of England	Demolished
St George, South Street	St David's		George	Medieval	1843	Church of England	Demolished
St Mary Major, Exeter	St David's		Mary	Medieval	1971	Church of England	Rebuilt 1866-1867. Demolished, now a lawn
St Martin, Exeter	St David's		Martin of Tours	Medieval		Church of England	Churches Conservation Trust 1995
St Paul de Leon, Exeter	St David's		Paul Aurelian	Medieval	1936	Church of England	Demolished 1936
St John, Fore Street	St David's		John?	Medieval	1937		Demolished
St Lawrence, Exeter	St David's		Lawrence	Medieval	1942	Church of England	Destroyed by WW2 bombing
George's Chapel, Exeter	St David's			1760	1987	Presbyterian	Now a Wetherspoon's pub
St David's Hele Road							?
Buller Road Evangelical Church						Gospel Hall	
