= Torridge =

Torridge may refer to:

- Torridge District, a local government district in the county of Devon, England
- River Torridge, is a river in Devon in England
- Torridge Lass, a company
- Torridge Hospital was a health facility in Meddon Street, Bideford, Devon, England
