= James Ford (cricketer, born 1836) =

English cricketer

Personal information
- Full name: James Edward Ford
- Born: 6 February 1836; Heavitree, Devon, England
- Died: 11 March 1877 (aged 41); Hastings, Sussex, England
- Batting: Unknown

Career statistics
Competition	First-class
Matches	3
Runs scored	21
Batting average	4.20
100s/50s	–/–
Top score	17
Catches/stumpings	2/–
- Source: Cricinfo, 2 August 2019

James Edward Ford (6 February 1836 – 11 March 1877) was an English first-class cricketer.

The son of the Reverend James Ford, he was born at Heavitree near Exeter and was educated at Rugby School. He made his debut in first-class cricket for the Marylebone Cricket Club (MCC) against Kent at Gravesend in 1857. In the same year he made two further first-class appearances, playing for the Gentlemen of England against the Gentlemen of Kent and Sussex at Lord's, and for the MCC against Sussex at St Leonards-on-Sea. He died at Hastings in March 1877.
