= John Taylor & Co =

Bell foundry based in Loughborough

Coordinates: 52°46′23.44″N 1°11′56.10″W

John Taylor Bell Foundry (Loughborough) Limited
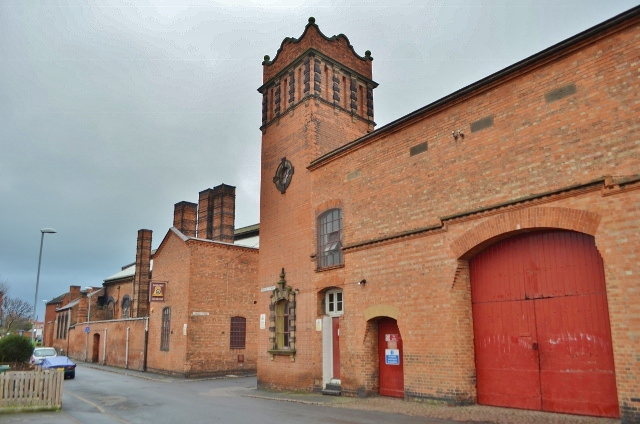
- The foundry premises in Freehold Street, Loughborough
- Trade name: John Taylor & Co
- Formerly: Taylors Eayre & Smith Limited (2005–2009)
- Company type: Subsidiary
- Industry: Bellfounding
- Founded: 1784; 242 years ago
- Founder: John Taylor
- Headquarters: Loughborough, England
- Key people: Michael Wilby 2019-2021 (MD)
- Parent: UK Bell Foundries Ltd
- Subsidiaries: John Taylor International
- Website: taylorbells.co.uk

John Taylor Bell Foundry (Loughborough) Limited, trading as John Taylor & Co and commonly known as Taylor's Bell Foundry, Taylor's of Loughborough, or simply Taylor's, is the world's largest working bell foundry. It is located in Loughborough, in the Charnwood borough of Leicestershire, England. The business originated in the 14th century, and the Taylor family took over in 1784.

The company manufactures bells for use in clock towers, rings of bells for change ringing, chimes, and carillons. In 2005, Taylor's merged with Eayre & Smith Limited (bellhangers) and from 2005 until 2009 was known as Taylors Eayre & Smith Limited.

In September 2009, Taylor's went into administration but was bought out of administration by a consortium named UK Bell Foundries Ltd, led by Andrew Wilby, which re-financed the business. Since then, the company has re-established its presence both in the UK and in export markets.

The foundry has a museum of bells and bellfounding, which is the only one of its kind in the UK. It is one of the few Victorian purpose-built manufacturing sites still being used for its original purpose. Its campanile contains the most-pealed bells in the world.

== History ==
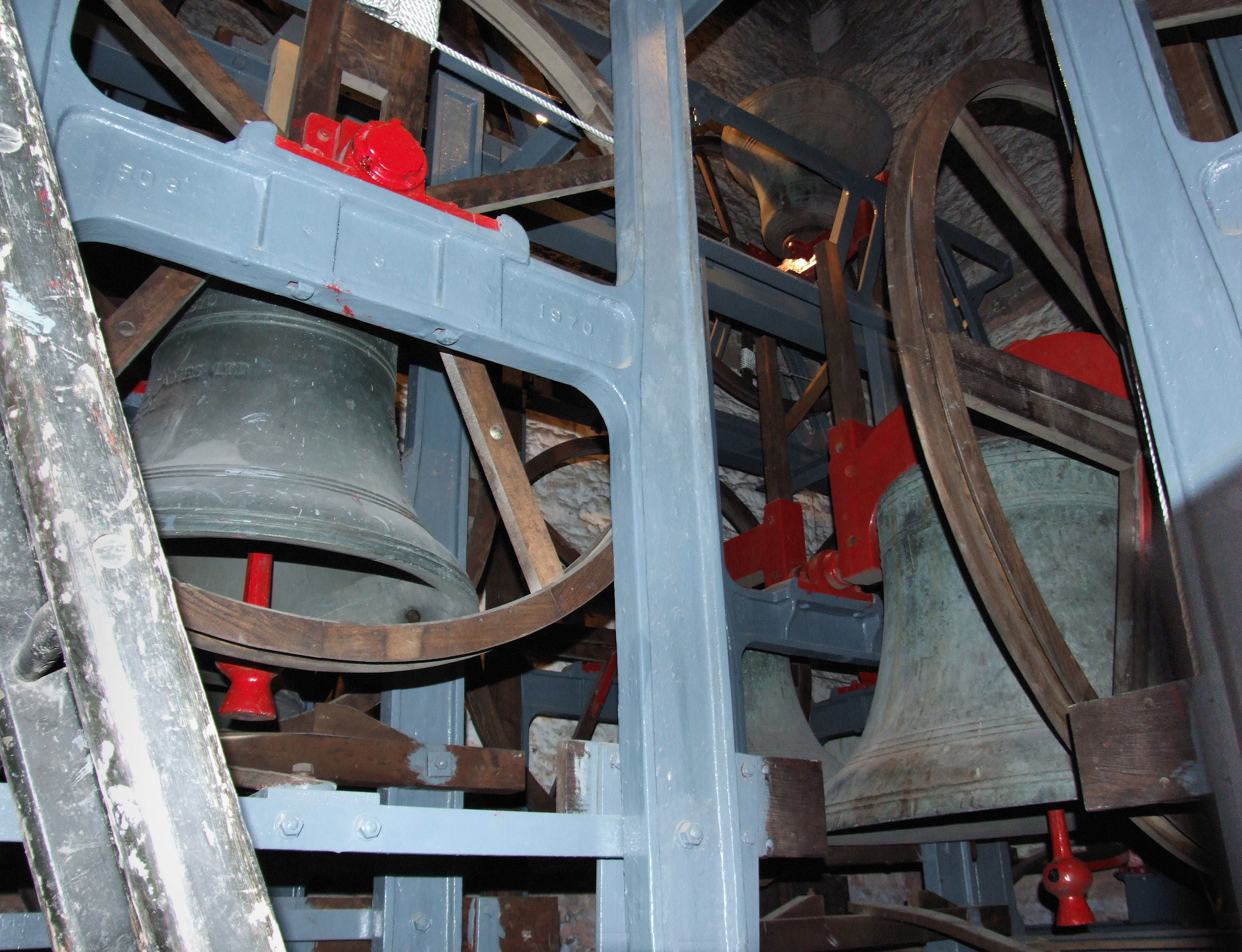
Inside the belfry of St Stephen's Church, Bristol, England. In 1970, Taylor's cast five of the twelve bells and a new frame, in which they re-hung all twelve.

The present company is part of a line of bellfounders dating back to Johannes de Stafford in the 14th century, who was also a mayor of Leicester. The Taylor family became involved in 1784 with Robert Taylor (1759–1830), and a foundry was established in Loughborough in 1839 by his son John Taylor (1797–1858), moving to the current site in 1859. The Taylors also had foundries in Oxford and St Neots between 1786 and 1854.

During much of the later 19th century, the foundry was under the management of John William Taylor (1827–1906). Taylor's was the first bellfounder to adopt "true-harmonic" tuning in the late 19th century. In 1963, Paul Taylor, last of the Taylor family in the business, appeared on the American TV panel show What's My Line?, challenging the panel with his occupation as a bell maker.

The foundry is based in buildings on Freehold Street, which are Grade II* listed. The National Twelve Bell Contest is competed for annually by the leading teams in England for "The Taylor Trophy".

On 18 September 2009, the company went into administration. Mazars, which had previously been acting as advisors to the company during attempts to secure extra funding, were appointed administrators. On 2 October 2009, it was reported that the administrators were "optimistic about its future." On 15 October 2009, in a statement released by UK Bell Foundries Ltd, a consortium of ringers, members of the bell industry and other investors, it was stated that the foundry would reopen on 19 October, reverting to the previous name of John Taylor & Co. Paul Taylor's widow, Mrs Merle Taylor, was honorary president of the new company until her death.

The board from 2015 to 2020 comprised Andrew W R Wilby (chairman and CEO), Laith R Reynolds, David E Potter, Michael J Semken, Simon E Adams, D Paul Mason and Andrew B Mills. In 2016, the directors of UK Bell Foundries Ltd founded the Loughborough Bellfoundry Trust and transferred ownership of the buildings, equipment, intellectual property and the museum to that body in perpetuity to safeguard it for the future. The Trust received emergency grants to restore several parts of the building from Historic England, as it was listed as a Grade II* building at risk. Further restoration was planned.

In 2018, the company established a subsidiary called John Taylor International, based in Australia, to serve the southern hemisphere markets. At the end of 2020, Andrew Wilby resigned as director and CEO; David Potter also resigned as director. Andrew's son Michael Wilby was managing director from October 2019 to August 2021.

== Notable bells and rings ==
In 1881 at Loughborough, Taylor's cast "Great Paul" (the largest British cast bell in Britain) for St Paul's Cathedral in London, weighing 17,002 kilograms (37,483 lb) or more than 17 metric tons. Rock band AC/DC used a 2000-pound cast bronze bell for the song "Hells Bells", which was originally used on the Back in Black Tour in 1980.

Many churches around the world have used bells cast at Taylor's bell foundry, including:

Tower	Location	Details of bells cast	Largest bell cast (kg)	Year(s) of casting	Comments	Image
All Saints' Church, Westbury	Westbury, Wiltshire, UK	8 change ringing bells	1,784	1921	Third heaviest ring of eight bells in the world hung for change ringing. Grade I listed as "an exceptional example" of the founders' work.	
Beverley Minster	Beverley, East Riding of Yorkshire, UK	10 change ringing bells	2,105	1896-1901	Third heaviest ringing peal of ten in the world.	
Beverley Minster	Beverley, East Riding of Yorkshire, UK	bourdon bell "Great John"	7,151	1902		
Buckfast Abbey	Buckfastleigh, Devon, UK	bourdon bell "Hosanna"	7,476	1936	One of the largest bells in the UK still rung by hand.	
Buckfast Abbey	Buckfastleigh, Devon, UK	14 change ringing bells	2,097	1935	Heaviest ring of bells in a Catholic church hung for change ringing.	
Burton Memorial Tower	University of Michigan, Ann Arbor, Michigan, United States	55 bell carilllon	10,695	1936		
Canberra National Carillon	Canberra, Australia	57 bell carillon	6,108	1968-2019	Major overhaul in 2019, Taylor's cast new bass bell, largest bell cast at Taylor's for more than 25 years.	
Church of Our Lady and Saint Nicholas, Liverpool	Liverpool, Merseyside	14 change ringing bells	2,128	1952-2008	New peal of thirteen change ringing bells in 1952, previous peal destroyed in Liverpool Blitz. Fourteenth bell cast in 2008.	
Christ Church Cathedral, Dublin	Dublin, Ireland	9 change ringing bells, including the tenor bell	2,295	1884-1999	Largest change ringing installation in the world by number of bells (19). Taylor's augmented the bells to a ring of sixteen plus three semitones and recast the tenor bell.	
Duke Chapel Carillon	Duke University, Durham, North Carolina, USA	50 bell carillon	5,060	1932		
Evesham Bell Tower	Evesham, Worcestershire	14 change ringing bells	1,813	1951-1992	One of the country's most famous detached bell towers; considered by many to be amongst the finest products of the foundry.	
Exeter Cathedral	Exeter, Devon, UK	5 change ringing bells including tenor bell "Grandisson"	3,684	1902-1922	Second heaviest ring of bells hung for full circle ringing.	
Hull Minster	Kingston upon Hull, East Riding of Yorkshire	15 change ringing bells, 25-bell carillon	1,304	1899-2016	One of the largest bell-installations in the country.	
Inveraray Bell Tower	Inveraray, Argyll & Bute, UK	10 change ringing bells	2,112	1920	Heaviest peal of change ringing bells in Scotland.	
Joseph Chamberlain Memorial Clock Tower	University of Birmingham, Birmingham, UK	bourdon bell "Big Joe"	6,117	1908		
Leeds Minster	Leeds, West Yorkshire	13 change ringing bells	2,057	1932	Second heaviest peal of bells in Yorkshire, after only York Minster.	
Liverpool Anglican Cathedral	Liverpool, Merseyside, UK	bourdon bell "Great George"	14,900	1940	Third largest bell in the UK	
Loughborough Memorial Carillon	Loughborough, Leicestershire, UK	47 bell carillon	4,211	1923		
Malta Siege Bell	Siege Bell Memorial, Valletta, Malta	bourdon bell	10,899	1992		
Manchester Town Hall	Manchester, UK	23 bell carillon, including 13 change ringing bells	2,170	1937		
Manchester Town Hall	Manchester, UK	bourdon bell "Great Abel"	8,279	1882		
Memorial Church of Harvard University	Cambridge, Massachusetts, USA	World War I memorial bell	"more than 7,000 pounds (3,200 kg)"	1926	Restored in 2017	
Nottingham Council House	Nottingham, UK	5 clock bells including bourdon bell "Little John"	10,528	1928	Second deepest clock chime in the UK after York.	
Rainbow Bridge Carillon	Niagara Falls, Ontario, Canada	55 bell carillon	8,909	1947		
Southwark Cathedral	Southwark, Greater London UK	2 change ringing bells	2,477	2016	Recast tenor and 7th bells in 2016, rehung and retuned all other bells.	
St Andrew's Cathedral, Singapore	Singapore, Singapore	13 change ringing bells	1,297	1888-2019	Heaviest peal of change ringing bells in Asia. Original chime of 8 bells retuned or recast to form core of new ring.	
St Chad's Church, Shrewsbury	Shrewsbury, Shropshire	12 change ringing bells	2,010	1914	First complete peal of twelve true-harmonic bells cast by Taylor's.	
St George's Church, Vernet-les-Bains	Vernet-les-Bains, France	10 change ringing bells	261	2018-2019	First and only peal of change ringing bells in France.	
St George's Church, Ypres	Ypres, Belgium	8 change ringing bells	323	2017	First and only peal of change ringing bells in Belgium. Cast to commemorate centenary of the end of the First World War.	
St George-in-the-Pines	Banff, Alberta, Canada	11 bell chime		1926	Shipped to Banff via the Panama Canal. First of only two churches in Canada to possess a set from John Taylor & Co.	
St Mary Redcliffe	Bristol, UK	12+2 change ringing bells	2,575	1903-2012	Heaviest ring of bells hung for full circle ringing in the world not in a Cathedral.	
St Mary's Church, Southampton	Southampton, Hampshire, UK	10 change ringing bells	1,096	1945	Replaced a peal of ten also cast by Taylor's in 1912, destroyed in Southampton Blitz. First ring of church bells in the UK to be restored post war.	
St Michael and All Angels' Church, Heavitree	Heavitree, Exeter, UK	8 change ringing bells	1,309	1897	Bells are listed for preservation for their quality.	
St Patrick's Cathedral, Dublin	Dublin, Ireland	15 change ringing bells	2,307	1896-2007	Heaviest ring of bells in Ireland, and heaviest change ringing peal outside of the UK.	
St Paul's Cathedral, London	City of London, UK	3 clock bells and bourdon bell "Great Paul"	17,002	1878	Great Paul is the heaviest bell ever cast at Taylor's and the second heaviest bell in the UK.	
St Paul's Cathedral, London	City of London, UK	12 change ringing bells	3,125	1878	3rd heaviest peal of bells by tenor weight in the world hung for change ringing	
St Peter's Cathedral, Adelaide	Adelaide, Australia	8 change ringing bells	2,096	1946	Heaviest ring of bells in Australia, and heaviest tenor bell in the Southern Hemisphere.	
The Bok Tower	Lake Wales, Florida, USA	60 bell carillon	10,544	1927		
Trinity Church, Manhattan	New York City, New York, USA	13 change ringing bells	1,214	2006-2016	First and only peal of twelve change ringing bells in the United States. Thirteenth bell cast in 2016.	
Trinity Church, Ossett	Ossett, West Yorkshire, UK	16 change ringing bells	1,396	1934-2016	Originally a peal of ten bells, augmented to twelve (plus one extra semitone) in 1987, to fourteen in 2012 and to fifteen in 2016. Only diatonic peal of fifteen change ringing bells in the world.	
Truro Cathedral	Truro, Cornwall	14 change ringing bells, 4 clock bells	1,719	1904-2011	First and only peal of twelve bells in Cornwall. Original peal of ten augmented in 2011 with four new bells.	
Washington National Cathedral	Washington, D.C., USA	53-bell carillon	10,697	1963		
Wells Cathedral	Wells, Somerset, UK	2 change ringing bells including tenor bell	2,864	1877	Tenor bell is 5th heaviest bell in the world hung for change ringing.	
Wills Memorial Building	University of Bristol, Bristol, UK	bourdon bell "Great George"	9,724	1925	Second heaviest bell rung by hand in the UK.	
Winchester Cathedral	Winchester, Hampshire	12 change ringing bells	1,806	1937	Heaviest peal of bells in Hampshire; one of Europe's largest Cathedrals.	
Worcester Cathedral	Worcester, Worcestershire, UK	15 change ringing bells and bourdon bell	4,215	1868-1928	Ringing peal is 5th heaviest in the world by overall weight.	
Yale Memorial Carillon	Yale University, New Haven, Connecticut, USA	54 bell carillon	6,078	1922		
York Minster	York, North Yorkshire, UK	14 change ringing bells	3,020	1925-1978	4th heaviest peal of bells by tenor weight in the world hung for change ringing.	
York Minster	York, North Yorkshire, UK	35 bell carillon	1,215	1933-2008	Originally a chime of 11 bells from St Mary's Church, Nelson, Lancashire, increased to 35 bells in early 2000s. First UK Cathedral to have both a carillon and change ringing peal.	
York Minster	York, North Yorkshire, UK	bourdon bell "Great Peter"	11,009	1927	Deepest toned hour bell in the UK. Heaviest bell in the UK still rung manually.	
