= Primrose Pitman =

British painter (1902-1998)

Primrose Vera Pitman
- Born: 1902; Exeter, Devon
- Died: 1998 (aged 95–96); Exeter, Devon
- Known for: Painting, drawing

Primrose Vera Pitman (1902 – 13 September 1998) was a British artist known for her detailed paintings, etchings and drawings of her native Exeter and Devon.

== Biography ==
Pitman was born in Exeter and studied art at the local Royal Albert Memorial College. After graduation she continued to live in the Heavitree district of the city and was a member of the Exeter Art Society and the Kenn Group. Drawings by Pitman of war-time Exeter were published in the 1942 book Exeter Blitz. In 1953 she became a member of the Society of Graphic Art and also regularly exhibited with the Royal West of England Academy. The Royal Albert Memorial Museum in Exeter holds several of her drawings of the city. In 1972 a collection of her etchings and drawings were published. Her tinted etchings of the Iron Bridge in Exeter can be seen on the front and back covers of another book. Original etchings by Pitman of other well-known buildings in Exeter such as Mol's Coffee House, The Guildhall and the Washington Singer Laboratories occasionally come up for sale at specialist galleries.
