= List of churches in Cumbria =

Lists of churches in Cumbria may be found in the six lists for each of the ceremonial county's former constituent districts.

Church of England churches in most of Cumbria are in the Diocese of Carlisle, although an area including Alston Moor is in the Diocese of Newcastle.

Places of worship other than Anglican churches are listed in the Places of worship registered for marriage, the register produced under the Places of Worship Registration Act 1855.

== Cumberland ==
- List of churches in Allerdale
- List of churches in the City of Carlisle
- List of churches in Copeland

== Westmorland and Furness ==
- List of places of worship in Barrow-in-Furness
- List of churches in Eden District
- List of churches in South Lakeland

A summary of statistics is given below.

Unitary authority	Cumberland			Westmorland and Furness			
Former district	Carlisle	Allerdale	Copeland	Eden	South Lakeland	Barrow-in-Furness	Total
	List	List	List	List	List	List	
Total churches	98	121	71	121	147	33	591
Population (2016 est.)	108,400	96,422	70,603	53,000	104,000	67,300	508,725
Inhabitants per church	1,106	797	994	438	707	2,039	861
By denomination*
Church of England	54	68	45	72	87	14	340
Methodist	13	18	9	33	28	6	107
Roman Catholic	7	8	8	3	10	7	43
United Reformed	3	4	1	1	5	3	17
Baptist Union			1	4	3	1	9
Others	21	24	7	10	18	4	84

*numbers may not add to total due to some churches counting towards more than one denomination

== Map of medieval parish churches ==
For the purposes of this map medieval is taken to be pre-1485. It is of note that Cumbria, unlike most parts of England, saw a sustained programme of church building during the 16th and 17th centuries as the more remote parts of the district were settled.

Medieval parish churches in Cumbria
