= Torridge Hospital =

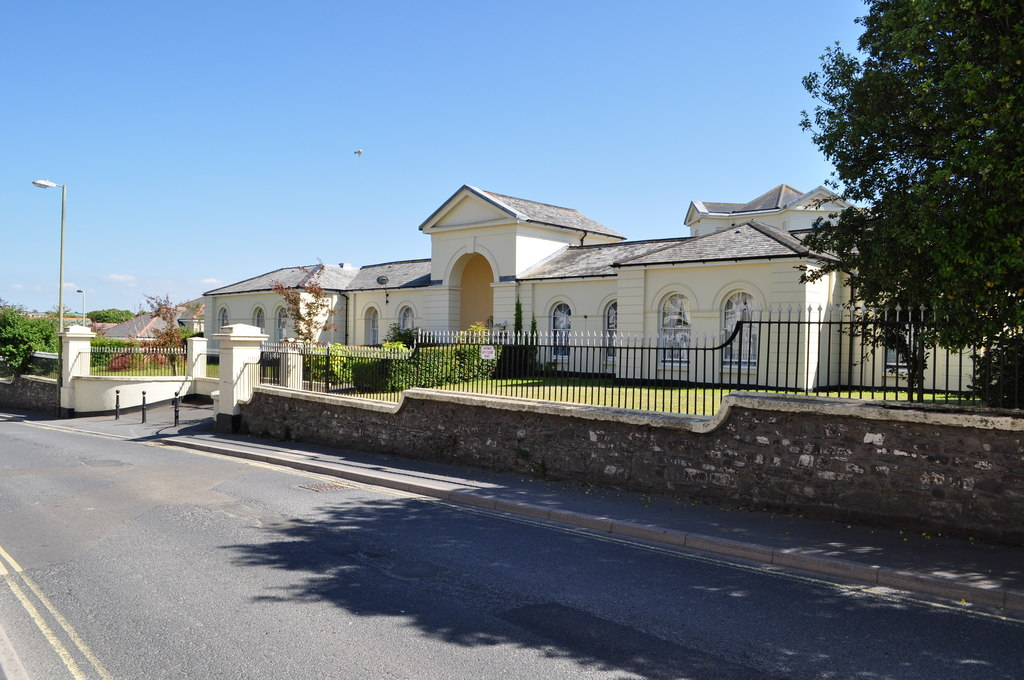
- Torridge Hospital

- Shown in Devon

Geography
- Location: Meddon Street, Bideford, Devon, England
- Coordinates: 51.0152°N 4.2118°W

Organisation
- Care system: NHS
- Type: Geriatric

History
- Founded: 1838
- Closed: c.1993

Links
- Lists: Hospitals in England

Torridge Hospital was a health facility in Meddon Street, Bideford, Devon, England. It has been converted into apartments and remains a Grade II listed building.

== History ==
The facility, which was designed by Sir George Gilbert Scott and William Bonython Moffatt, opened as the Bideford Union Workhouse in 1838. An isolation block was added in the 1880s. A new infirmary was completed in 1903. It became the Whitehouse Public Assistance Institution in 1930 and joined the National Health Service in 1948 before evolving into a geriatric facility. After the hospital closed in around 1993 the main building was converted into apartments as Westcroft Court.
