= List of churches in the City of Carlisle =

The following is a list of churches in the former Carlisle district in Cumbria. This area is now part of the Cumberland unitary authority area.

== Map of medieval parish churches ==
For the purposes of this map medieval is taken to be pre-1485. It is of note that Cumbria, unlike most parts of England, saw a sustained programme of church building during the 16th and 17th centuries as the more remote parts of the district were settled.

Medieval parish churches in the City of Carlisle district

== List ==
=== Active churches ===
The district has an estimated 98 churches for 108,400 inhabitants, a ratio of one church to every 1,106 people.

The following civil parishes have no active churches: Askerton, Carlatton, Kingmoor, Midgeholme, Solport and Upper Denton.

Name	Civil parish (settlement)	Dedication	Web	Founded	Denomination	Benefice	Notes
St Michael, Burgh by Sands	Burgh by Sands	Michael		Medieval	Church of England	East Solway Churches	Benefice also includes two churches in Allerdale
Thurstonfield Methodist Church	Burgh by Sands (Thurstonfield)				Methodist	North Cumbria Circuit	
St Mary, Beaumont	Beaumont	Mary		Medieval	Church of England	East Solway Churches	
Monkhill Methodist Church	Beaumont (Monkhill)			1840s	Methodist	North Cumbria Circuit	Building 1858, rebuilt 1904
St Giles, Great Orton	Orton	Giles		Medieval	Church of England	East Solway Churches	
St Mary the Virgin, Rockcliffe	Rockcliffe	Mary		Medieval	Church of England	Rockcliffe & Blackford	Rebuilt 1848
St John the Baptist, Blackford	Westlinton (Blackford)	John the Baptist		1870	Church of England	Rockcliffe & Blackford	
St Michael, Dalston	Dalston	Michael		Medieval	Church of England	Dalston etc	Rebuilt 1890
Dalston Methodist Church	Dalston				Methodist	North Cumbria Circuit	
St John, Cumdivock	Dalston (Cumdivock)	John ?		1870s	Church of England	Dalston etc	
All Saints, Raughton Head	Dalston (Raughton Head)	All Saints		pre-C17th	Church of England	Dalston etc	Current building and church (prev. chapel) 1678
St Mary, Wreay	St Cuthbert Without (Wreay)	Mary		Medieval	Church of England	Dalston etc	Rebuilt 1840-1842
St John the Evangelist, Houghton	Stanwix Rural (Houghton)	John the Evangelist		1839	Church of England	Houghton with Kingsmoor	
St Peter, Kingmoor	Carlisle (Kingmoor)	Peter		1930	Church of England	Houghton with Kingsmoor	
St Mark, Belah	Carlisle (Belah)	Mark		1951	Church of England	Stanwix	
St Michael, Stanwix	Carlisle (Stanwix)	Michael		1841	Church of England	Stanwix	Grade II listed
Holy Trinity, Carlisle	Carlisle	Trinity		1828	Church of England	Holy Trinity & St Barnabas	Current building 1982
St Barnabas, Carlisle	Carlisle	Barnabas		1899	Church of England	Holy Trinity & St Barnabas	Firstly a mission hall, current building 1935
St Luke, Morton	Carlisle	Luke		1958	Church of England		
St James, Carlisle	Carlisle (Denton Holme)	James		1865-1867	Church of England	Denton Holme	
Carlisle Cathedral	Carlisle	Holy & Undivided Trinity		Medieval	Church of England		
St Cuthbert, Carlisle	Carlisle	Cuthbert		Ancient	Church of England		Rebuilt 1778
St John the Evangelist, Carlisle	Carlisle	John the Evangelist		1864-1867	Church of England	SS John & Andrew	
St Andrew, Botcherby	Carlisle (Botcherby)	Andrew		late C19th	Church of England	SS John & Andrew	
St Aidan, Carlisle	Carlisle	Aidan of Lindisfarne		1899-1902	Church of England		Grade II listed
The Way, Carlisle	Carlisle				Church of England		
St Herbert, Carlisle	Carlisle	Herbert of Derwentwater		1932	Church of England		
St John the Baptist, Upperby	Carlisle (Upperby)	John the Baptist		1840	Church of England		
St Elisabeth, Harraby	Carlisle	Elizabeth		1967	Church of England		
Our Lady & St Joseph, Carlisle	Carlisle	Mary & Joseph		1800s	Roman Catholic	Our Lady of Eden	First building 1820s, current building 1891-1893
Christ the King, Carlisle	Carlisle	Jesus		1954-1955	Roman Catholic	Sacred Heart Parish	
St Margaret Mary, Carlisle	Carlisle	Margaret Mary Alacoque			Roman Catholic	Sacred Heart Parish	
St Augustine, Carlisle	Carlisle	Augustine ?			Roman Catholic		
St Bede, Carlisle	Carlisle	Bede		1866	Roman Catholic	Cumbrian Martyrs Parish	Rebuilt on new site 1959
St Edmund, Carlisle	Carlisle	Edmund Campion		1972-1973	Roman Catholic	Cumbrian Martyrs Parish	Parish formed by merger 2017
Carlisle Baptist Church	Carlisle			pre-1809	FIEC		
Newtown Methodist Church	Carlisle				Methodist	North Cumbria Circuit	
Wigton Road Methodist Church	Carlisle			1928-1929	Methodist	North Cumbria Circuit	
Methodists @ Tithe Barn	Carlisle			1922	Methodist	North Cumbria Circuit	Formed 2006 by remnants of Carlisle Central Methodist
Upperby Methodist Church	Carlisle (Upperby)			1901	Methodist	North Cumbria Circuit	
St George's United Reformed Church	Carlisle	George		1862-1863	URC		Sold old building 2014, meets in smaller building
The Border Kirk	Carlisle			1832	Church of Scotland		2004 union of congregations in Carlisle and Longtown
Lowther Street Congregational Church	Carlisle			1658 (?)	Cong Federation		Met in Annetwell St 1781-1843. Current building 1843
Carlisle Salvation Army	Carlisle				Salvation Army		
Carlisle Quaker Meeting	Carlisle			1693	Quakers	Cumberland Area Quakers	
Carlisle Seventh-Day Adventist Church	Carlisle			1944	7th-Day Adventist		
Carlisle Church of the Nazarene	Carlisle				Nazarene		
Elim Community Church, Carlisle	Carlisle			1927	Elim		From 1979 met in old St Paul's Anglican church
Elim Free Church, Carlisle	Carlisle			1939	Elim Bible Pattern		Formed out of a split in the Elim movement
Revive City Church	Carlisle	Jesus		2004	Newfrontiers		A ChristCentral Church, part of the Newfrontiers family - formerly King's Church Carlisle
Carlisle Vineyard Church	Carlisle			2013	Vineyard		Planted from Causeway Coast Vineyard, Coleraine
Morton Park Hall	Carlisle			1954	Gospel Hall		
Hebron Evangelical Church	Carlisle	Hebron		1895	Gospel Hall		EA
Carlisle City Church	Carlisle				Independent		Meets in Lowther Street Congregational
Carlisle Christian Fellowship	Carlisle			1978	Independent		EA
Church-in-Reach	Carlisle			1939	Independent		Previously Raffles Community Church
Victory Church Carlisle	Carlisle				Independent		
Grace Evangelical Church, Carlisle	Carlisle				Independent		
Lighthouse Baptist Church, Carlisle	Carlisle				Independent		
St James, Cummersdale	Cummersdale	James		1927	Church of England	Denton Holme	
All Saints, Scotby	Wetheral (Scotby)	All Saints		1854	Church of England	Scotby, Cotehill, Cumwhinton	
St John the Evangelist, Cotehill	Wetheral (Cotehill)	John the Evangelist		1868	Church of England	Scotby, Cotehill, Cumwhinton	
Cotehill Methodist Church	Wetheral (Cotehill)				Methodist	North Cumbria Circuit	
Holy Trinity & St Constantine, Wetheral	Wetheral	Trinity & Constantine (?)		Medieval	Church of England	Eden Churches	
Wetheral Methodist Church	Wetheral				Methodist	North Cumbria Circuit	
St Paul, Holme Eden	Wetheral (Warwick Bridge)	Paul		1845	Church of England	Eden Churches	
Our Lady & St Wilfrid, Warwick Bridge	Wetheral (Warwick Bridge)	Mary & Wilfrid		1841	Roman Catholic	Our Lady of Eden	Parish formed by merger 2011 with Our Lady Carlisle
St Mary the Virgin, Cumwhitton	Cumwhitton	Mary		Medieval	Church of England	Eden, Gelt & Irthing Team	
St Mary the Virgin, Cumrew	Cumrew	Mary		Medieval	Church of England	Eden, Gelt & Irthing Team	Rebuilt 1890
St Peter, Castle Carrock	Castle Carrock	Peter		Medieval	Church of England	Eden, Gelt & Irthing Team	Rebuilt 1828
Talkin Chapel	Hayton (Talkin)	Unknown		1842	Church of England	Eden, Gelt & Irthing Team	
St Mary Magdalene, Hayton	Hayton	Mary Magdalene		Medieval	Church of England	Eden, Gelt & Irthing Team	Rebuilt 1780
Corby Hill Methodist Church	Hayton (Corby Hill)				Methodist	North Cumbria Circuit	
St Thomas a Becket, Farlam	Farlam	Thomas Becket		Medieval	Church of England	Eden, Gelt & Irthing Team	Rebuilt 1860
St John the Evangelist, Crosby-on-Eden	Stanwix Rural (Crosby-on-E)	John the Evangelist		Medieval	Church of England	Eden, Gelt & Irthing Team	Rebuilt 1854
All Saints, Scaleby	Scaleby	All Saints		Medieval	Church of England	Eden, Gelt & Irthing Team	
St Kentigern, Irthington	Irthington	Mungo		Medieval	Church of England	Eden, Gelt & Irthing Team	
St Martin, Brampton	Brampton	Martin of Tours		1789	Church of England	Eden, Gelt & Irthing Team	Rebuilt 1878. Replaced old church (see below)
Brampton Methodist Church	Brampton				Methodist	North Cumbria Circuit	
Brampton United Reformed Church	Brampton				URC		
Bethesda Evangelical Church, Brampton	Brampton	Pool of Bethesda			Gospel Hall		
St Michael & All Angels, Arthuret	Arthuret	Michael & Angels		1609	Church of England	Esk Parishes	
Longtown Methodist Church	Arthuret (Longtown)				Methodist	North Cumbria Circuit	
St Andrew, Kirkandrews-on-Esk	Kirkandrews	Andrew		Medieval	Church of England	Esk Parishes	Rebuilt C17th, 1775
St Nicholas, Nicholforest	Nicholforest	Nicholas		1866	Church of England	Esk Parishes	
St Cuthbert, Kirklinton	Kirklinton Middle	Cuthbert		Medieval	Church of England	Bewcastle, Stapleton etc	Current building 1845-1846
St Mary, Hethersgill	Hethersgill	Mary		1876	Church of England	Bewcastle, Stapleton etc	
St Mary, Stapleton	Stapleton	Mary		Medieval	Church of England	Bewcastle, Stapleton etc	Rebuilt 1830
St Cuthbert, Bewcastle	Bewcastle	Cuthbert		Medieval	Church of England	Bewcastle, Stapleton etc	
Bewcastle United Reformed Church	Bewcastle				URC		
St Mary, Walton	Walton	Mary		Medieval	Church of England	Lanercost, Walton, Gilsland	Rebuilt 1811, 1869-1870
St Mary Magdalene, Lanercost	Burtholme (Lanercost)	Mary Magdalene		Medieval	Church of England	Lanercost, Walton, Gilsland	Previously the church of Lanercost Priory
St Cuthbert, Nether Denton	Nether Denton (Low Row)	Cuthbert		Medieval	Church of England	Lanercost, Walton, Gilsland	Rebuilt 1868
Lees Hill Mission Hall	Kingwater				Church of England	Lanercost, Walton, Gilsland	
St Mary Magdalene, Gilsland	Waterhead (Gilsland)	Mary Magdalene		1851-1854	Church of England	Lanercost, Walton, Gilsland	
Gilsland Methodist Church	Waterhead (Gilsland)				Methodist	North Cumbria Circuit	

=== Defunct churches ===
Name	Civil parish (settlement)	Dedication	Web	Founded	Redundant	Denomination	Notes
St Mary, Carlisle	Carlisle	Mary		Medieval		Church of England	Stood in cathedral grounds, now demolished
Christ Church, Carlisle	Carlisle	Jesus		1830	1938	Church of England	Demolished 1953
St Stephen, Carlisle	Carlisle	Stephen		1865	1964	Church of England	
St Paul, Carlisle	Carlisle	Paul			1979	Church of England	Building now home to Elim church (see above)
St Alban's Chapel	Carlisle	Alban		Medieval		Church of England	Long demolished
Union Street Wesleyan Methodist Church	Carlisle					Methodist	
South John Street Wesleyan Methodist Church	Carlisle					Methodist	
Fisher Street Presbyterian Church	Carlisle			1730s	1986	Presbyterian	Rebuilt 1894
Etterby Presbyterian Mission Hall	Carlisle			1881	1947	Presbyterian	Demolished late 1960s
Denton Street Chapel	Carlisle			1872	1910s	Church of Christ	Later used by Unitarians, demolished 1966
Cecil Street Primitive Methodist Chapel	Carlisle			mid-C19th	1965	Methodist	
Milbourne Street Mission	Carlisle						
St James Mission, Blencowe Street	Carlisle						
Willowholme Mission	Carlisle						
Beacon Hall, Beaconsfield Street	Carlisle					Presbyterian	
Cumbria University Chapel	Carlisle			1894			Workhouse chapel
Harraby Methodist Church	Carlisle					Methodist	Demolished 2010
Harraby Family Church	Carlisle						May still be active
Lord Street Reading Room	Carlisle			1851	1950		
Railway Mission Hall	Carlisle			1920			Used by Grace Evangelical for a time
Unitarian Church	Carlisle			1889	1913-1914		
Tindale Mission Church	Farlam (Tindale)					Church of England	
St Kentigern, Askerton	Askerton (Kirkcambeck)	Mungo		Medieval		Church of England	Rebuilt 1885. Presumably defunct
Brampton Old Church	Brampton			Medieval	1978	Church of England	Stood 1.5 miles NW of the current town
St Leonard, Warwick	Wetheral (Warwick-on-Eden)	Leonard of Noblac		Medieval		Church of England	Closed for worship April 2017
Over Denton Parish Church	Upper Denton			Medieval		Church of England	
St John's Hall, Cumwhinton	Wetheral (Cumwhinton)	John ?				Church of England	Closed
Eden Community Church	Carlisle				2020? Pre 2024	Independent	Website last used in 2020, now repurposed in November 2024 for an unrelated church plant commencing in September 2025
