= St George-in-the-Pines =

Coordinates: 51°10′29″N 115°34′09″W

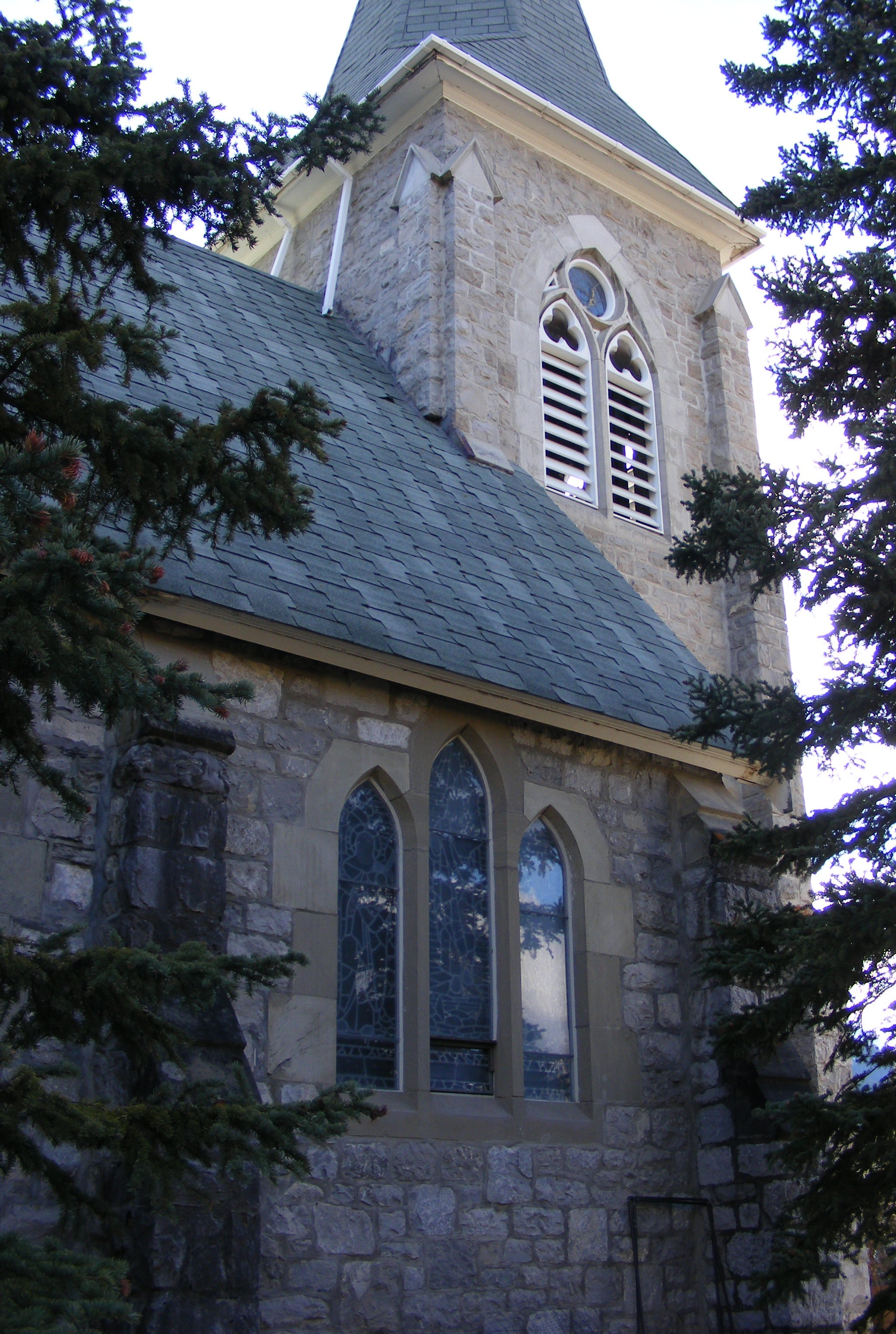
St George-in-the-Pines' steeple viewed from behind

St George-in-the-Pines is an Anglican church in Banff, Alberta, called "one of Banff's oldest places of worship". The building was designed in the Gothic Revival style by English architect FP Oakley and the cornerstone was laid by Governor General the Lord Stanley of Preston in 1889.

== History ==
The first Anglican service in Banff took place in a log cabin on Bear Street in 1887 before holding worship in a tent on the site of the present-day church as it was being built. Clergy also led evening service at the Banff Springs Hotel. The chancel was complete by 1897 and the Bishop of Calgary, the Right Reverend William Pinkham, consecrated St George's in June 1920, before the tower and spire were finished in 1926.

Prince George, Duke of Cornwall and York (laterly King George V), and his wife, Princess Mary, Duchess of Cornwall and York (the future Queen Mary), worshipped at St George-in-the-Pines in 1901. Three of their sons attended service at the church: Prince Edward, Prince of Wales (the future King Edward VIII), together with Prince George in 1927, and King George VI with his consort, Queen Elizabeth, in 1939. The pew in which the latter two sat is marked with a plaque. George and Elizabeth's daughter, Elizabeth II, the former Queen of Canada, also worshipped at St George-in-the-Pines.

In 2012, the church sought designation as a municipal historic resource and received approval on 30 July of the same year. It was also included as a point of interest along the Commonwealth Walkway, which was opened on 17 September 2017.

== Features ==
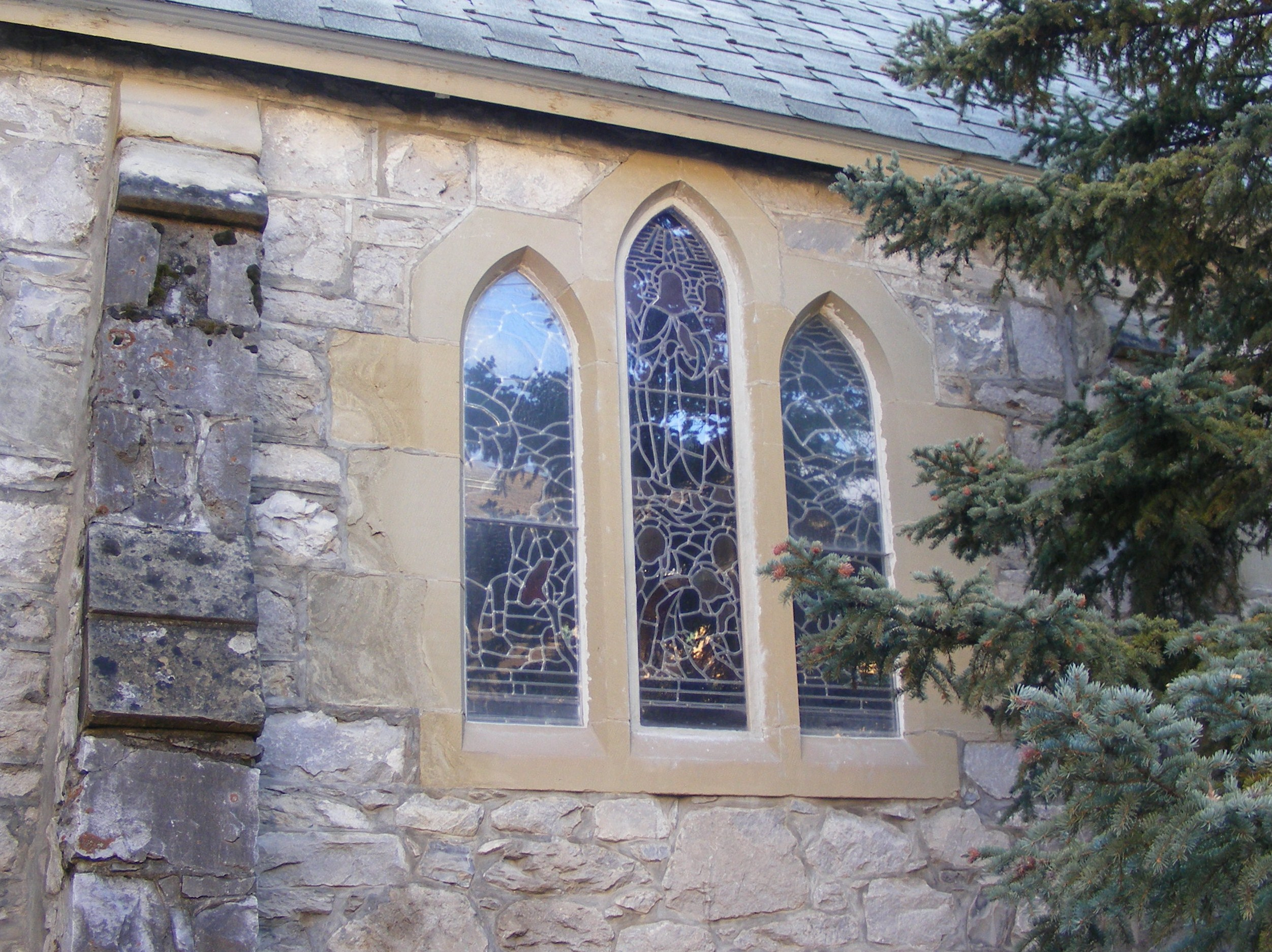
Some of the stained glass windows around St George-in-the-Pines

George-in-the-Pines possesses 50 stained glass windows depicting local flora and fauna, as well as 11 bells by John Taylor & Co, which were shipped from Loughborough, England, to Banff via the Panama Canal. They can be played by one person. St George-in-the-Pines was the first of only two churches in Canada to possess a set from that manufacturer.

== See also ==
- Anglican churches in the Americas

== Further information ==
- Whyte, John (1990), St. George's-in-the-Pines: The Anglican Church in Banff: a Centennial Celebration, Parish of St. George's-In-The-Pines, ASIN B0037V96IQ
