= Listed buildings in Westlinton =

Westlinton is a civil parish in the Cumberland district, Cumbria, England. It contains eight listed buildings that are recorded in the National Heritage List for England. All the listed buildings are designated at Grade II, the lowest of the three grades, which is applied to "buildings of national importance and special interest". The parish include the villages of Westlinton and Blackford, and is otherwise rural. The listed buildings include farmhouses, a house with outbuildings, two milestones, a bridge, and a church.

== Buildings ==
Name and location	Photograph	Date	Notes
Newtown Farmhouse; 54.95392°N 2.95415°W	—	1743	The farmhouse is in rendered brick on a stone plinth, and has a Welsh slate roof with coped gables. There are two storeys and three bays. The doorway has a moulded architrave, an inscribed pulvinated frieze, and a moulded cornice. The windows are sashes with segmental arches and stone sills.
Blackford Farmhouse; 54.94899°N 2.94349°W	—	Late 18th century	A sandstone farmhouse on a chamfered plinth, with quoins and a tiled roof. It has two storeys and three bays. The doorway and sash windows have plain surrounds.
Lyne Bank and outbuildings 54.97171°N 2.95008°W		1793 (probable)	Originally a public house and later a private house, it is in brick on a chamfered stone plinth, and has quoins and a hipped slate roof. There are two storeys and three bays, with a lower two-storey single-bay extension to the right. The doorway has an alternate block surround, and the windows, most of which are sashes, have plain surrounds; there is a casement window in the ground floor of the extension. To the rear is an adjoining brick stable block with an L-shaped plan, and with a tiled roof. (Note: Street View in June 2011 shows that the building was in use as a hotel and restaurant.)
Milestone; 54.96910°N 2.94879°W	—	1793 (probable)	The milestone was provided for the Carlisle to Longtown turnpike. It is in sandstone and has a rounded top. On the front is a circular recess for a cast iron plate, which is missing. The area is inscribed with the distance in miles to Carlisle. On top of the milestone is a bench mark and a stud.
Milestone; 54.95506°N 2.94392°W	—	1793 (probable)	The milestone was provided for the Carlisle to Longtown turnpike. It is in sandstone and has a rounded top. On the front is a circular recess for a cast iron plate, which is missing. The area is inscribed with the distance in miles to Carlisle. On top of the milestone is a bench mark.
Westlinton Bridge; 54.97274°N 2.94999°W	—	1793 (probable)	The bridge carries the A7 road over the River Lyne, and was originally provided for the Carlisle to Longtown turnpike. It is in sandstone, and consists of two segmental arches. The central pier has pointed cutwaters, and the abutments are on chamfered plinths, and at the ends are cylindrical piers. The bridge also has a string course and a chamfered coped parapet.
Firbank; 54.97380°N 2.96780°W	—	Early 19th century	A farmhouse in brick with cream headers, gutter modillions, and a slate roof, it has two storeys and three bays, and flanking single-storey wings with hipped roofs. The doorway has a surround of pilaster strips, a moulded cornice, and a fanlight. The windows, which are sashes, have flat brick arches and stone sills.
Church of St John the Baptist; 54.95326°N 2.94424°W		1870	The church is in sandstone with quoins, and a green slate roof with cross finials. It consists of a nave with a south porch, and a chancel with a north vestry. On the west gable is a bell turret with a slate spire. The porch has a pointed moulded arch, and the windows are mullioned with triform heads.

== Notes and references ==
=== Sources ===
- Historic England, "Newtown Farmhouse, Westlinton (1087609)", National Heritage List for England
- Historic England, "Blackford Farmhouse, Westlinton (1311709)", National Heritage List for England
- Historic England, "Lyne Bank and outbuildings, Westlinton (1335592)", National Heritage List for England
- Historic England, "Milestone at NGR NY 39360 64250, Westlinton (1087565)", National Heritage List for England
- Historic England, "Milestone at NGR NY 39647 62653, Westlinton (1157978)", National Heritage List for England
- Historic England, "Westlinton Bridge, Westlinton (1335593)", National Heritage List for England
- Historic England, "Firbank, Westlinton (1087566)", National Heritage List for England
- Historic England, "Church of St John the Baptist, Westlinton (1335576)", National Heritage List for England
- Historic England, Listed Buildings
- Hyde, Matthew; Pevsner, Nikolaus (2010) [1967], Cumbria, The Buildings of England, New Haven and London: Yale University Press, ISBN 978-0-300-12663-1
