= Ned Sanders =

English cricketer

Personal information
- Full name: Edward James Sanders
- Born: 6 October 1852; Heavitree, Devon, England
- Died: 27 October 1904 (aged 52); Heavitree, Devon, England
- Batting: Unknown
- Bowling: Unknown

Career statistics
Competition	First-class
Matches	1
Runs scored	3
Batting average	1.50
100s/50s	–/–
Top score	2
Balls bowled	8
Wickets	1
Bowling average	4.00
5 wickets in innings	–
10 wickets in match	–
Best bowling	1/4
Catches/stumpings	2/–
- Source: Cricinfo, 27 August 2019

Edward James Sanders (6 October 1852 – 27 October 1904) was an English first-class cricketer.

The son of Edward Andrew Sanders, he was born in October 1852 at Heavitree, Devon. He was educated at Harrow School, before going up to Trinity College, Cambridge. Sanders did not find a place in either of the cricketing elevens at Harrow or Cambridge, but did represent Cambridge in rackets against Oxford in 1872–74. After graduating from Cambridge, he became a banker and was a partner in the Exeter Bank, until it merged with Prescott's in 1902. Sanders was commissioned into the Royal 1st Devon Yeomanry as a cornet in September 1871, and was subsequently promoted to the rank of lieutenant and finally to the rank of captain in October 1881.

A keen amateur cricketer, he led his own personal team on tours to North America in September 1885 and September–October 1886, with the team playing a variety of matches in Canada and the United States, which included first-class matches against the Philadelphian cricket team. Sanders featured in one first-class match against the Philadelphians on the 1885 tour, scoring 3 runs and taking the wicket of Charles Newhall. In his final years he was the honorary secretary and treasurer of Devon County Cricket Club, then in its infancy. Sanders spent the final six years of his life in ill-health, unable to walk long distances. He died at Heavitree in October 1904.
