= List of new churches by George Gilbert Scott in South East England =

George Gilbert Scott (1811–78) was an English architect. Following his training, in 1836 he started working with William Bonython Moffatt, and they entered into partnership, initially specialising in designing workhouses. Scott became increasingly interested in the Gothic style, and the design of churches in this style. The partnership was dissolved in 1846, and Scott then set up his own office. He became "known primarily as a church architect", and as such he designed many new churches, and restored many more. In addition he designed monuments and memorials, public buildings including government offices, educational buildings, commercial buildings, and houses.

This list contains new churches designed by Scott in the South East England region. It is not complete, not least because some of the churches have been demolished.

== Key ==
Grade II*	Particularly important buildings of more than special interest.
Grade II	Buildings of national importance and special interest.

== Churches ==
Name	Location	Photograph	Date	Notes	Grade
St John the Evangelist's Church	West Meon, Hampshire; 51.0129°N 1.0894°W		1843	St John's is constructed in knapped flint with Bath stone dressings and a slate roof. It consists of a nave, aisles, a south porch, a chancel with north and south chapels, and a west tower. The church stands on a plinth, it has stepped buttresses, a corbelled parapet, and hood moulds above the window. The tower has three stages and an embattled parapet.	II
St John the Baptist's Church	Moulsford, South Oxfordshire; 51.5530°N 1.1481°W		c. 1846	The church is built on older foundations and is in Early English style. It is in flint and stone, with stone dressings and a tile roof. The church consists of a nave, a north aisle, a timber framed south porch, and a chancel. At the west end is a wooden bell tower with a splay-footed shingled roof.	II
Christ Church	Ramsgate, Kent; 51.3316°N 1.4106°E	—	1846–47	Christ Church is built in ragstone with slate roofs, and is in Early English style. It consists of a nave, aisles, a chancel with a south chapel, and a northeast steeple. There are gabled porches on the north, west and south sides. The steeple has a three-stage tower with corner buttresses and a shingled broach spire.	II
Holy Trinity Church	Headington Quarry, Oxford; 51.7577°N 1.1980°W		1848–49	The church is in Geometric style, and is built in local limestone with red tile roofs. It consists of a nave, a north aisle, and a chancel. On the west gable is a double bellcote. A Lady Chapel was added at the east end of the aisle in the 1990s.	II
St Gregory the Great's Church	Canterbury, Kent; 51.2818°N 1.0889°E	—	1850–52	The church is in Geometrical style, it closed in 1976, and has been converted into a university music centre. The building is faced with knapped flint, and has limestone dressings and a roof of red tiles. The plan consists of a nave, a north aisle, a south porch, a chancel, and a north vestry and organ chamber. Above the junction of the nave and the chancel is a two-tier triple bellcote.	II
Holy Trinity Church	Westcott, Surrey; 51.2236°N 0.3696°W		1851–52	The vestry was added later. The church is in flint with ashlar quoins and dressings, and with tiled roofs. It consists of a nave with a north porch, a south aisle under a separate roof with a side chapel, a chancel with a north transept, and a vestry under a separate roof. Rising from the west end of the nave is a spire. This has a north clock face, a timber bell stage, and a broached swept spire surmounted by a weathercock.	II*
Holy Trinity Church	Marlow, Buckinghamshire; 51.5750°N 0.7768°W	—	1852	The church is redundant and has been converted into offices. It is in Decorated style, and is built in flint with freestone dressings and a tile roof. The church consists of a nave, a north aisle, a southwest timber framed porch, and a chancel with a northeast chapel and vestry. At the west end is a bell turret with a lead base and a shingled spirelet.	II
St Mary Magdalene's Church	Shippon, St. Helen Without, Vale of White Horse, Oxfordshire; 51.6788°N 1.3061°W		1855	The church is in late Geometric style, and constructed in limestone with a tile roof. It consists of a nave with a timber framed north porch, and a chancel with a vestry. On the east gable of the nave is a belfry with a crocketed spire.	II
St Michael's Church	Leafield, West Oxfordshire; 51.8357°N 1.5391°W		c. 1858	The tower was completed in 1874, but has since been reduced. The church is in stone with imitation stone tiles on the roof, and it consists of a nave with a clerestory, aisles, a south porch, a central steeple, and a chancel. The steeple has a square base, an octagonal second stage, and a spire with gabled lucarnes.	II*
St Bartholomew's Church	Albourne, West Sussex; 50.9313°N 0.2128°W		1859	The church is in Early English style. It consists of a nave, a north aisle, a south porch, and a chancel. On the west gable is a bellcote. Incorporated into the church are the chancel arch and a window in the south chancel wall, both of which are Norman.	II
St Barnabas' Church	Ranmore, Wotton, Surrey; 51.2418°N 0.3601°W		1859	St Barnabas' Church originated as an estate church, it is in Decorated style, and is built in flint on an ashlar plinth, with ashlar dressings and slate roofs. The church has a cruciform plan, and consists of a nave, north and south transepts, a chancel, and a steeple at the crossing. The steeple has an octagonal tower with a corbel table, and a spire with gabled bell openings, a cross, and a weathervane.	II*
All Saints Church	Langton Green, Tunbridge Wells, Kent; 51.1310°N 0.2021°E		1862–63	All Saints is in Early English style, and was later extended and altered, probably according to Scott's plans. The church is built in sandstone and has tiled roofs. The current plan is cruciform, and consists of a nave, aisles, a south porch, transepts, and a chancel with a north vestry. There is a bellcote over the east end of the nave.	II*
Christ Church	Ottershaw, Runnymede, Surrey; 51.3610°N 0.5352°W		1863	Christ Church was built on land given by Sir Thomas Edward Colebrooke, the tower was added in 1885, and parish rooms in the 1990s. The church is built in red brick, with black brick providing polychromy, and has red tiled roofs. It consists of a nave, a chancel with a semicircular apse, a northeast chapel, and a west steeple with a shingled spire.	II
St Mary's Church	Stony Stratford, Milton Keynes, Buckinghamshire; 52.0552°N 0.8493°W	—	1864	St Mary's is in stone with a red tile roof. It consists of a nave, a north aisle (added in 1867), a chancel with an apse, and a southwest porch. Above the junction of the nave and the chancel is a gabled double bellcote.	II
St Michael's Church	Abingdon, Oxfordshire; 51.6713°N 1.2912°W		1864–67	The church is in flint with ashlar dressings. It consists of a nave with a clerestory, aisles, a south porch, north and south transepts, and a chancel with a north vestry and a church room added to the south in 1967. On the west gable is a bellcote.	II
St Mary's Church	Shackleford, Guildford, Surrey; 51.1952°N 0.6552°W		1865	St Mary's is in Early English style, and is built in Bargate stone with tiled roofs. It has a cruciform plan, consisting of a nave with a clerestory, aisles, a timber framed south porch, a chancel with an apse, and a steeple at the crossing. The steeple has an octagonal southeast stair turret and a shingled broach spire.	II
St John the Baptist's Church	Busbridge, Godalming, Surrey; 51.1771°N 0.6016°W		1865–67	The church is in Early English style, and is built in Bargate stone with a tiled roof. It consists of a nave, a south timber-framed porch, a steeple at the crossing, and a chancel with a north organ chamber and vestry. The steeple is shingled and has a broach spire with an iron finial.	II*
St Margaret's Church	Underriver, Seal, Kent; 51.2459°N 0.2293°E		1867	A two-storey vestry and organ chamber by W. D. Caroe were added in 1930. The church is built in Kentish ragstone with sandstone dressings and a red tile roof. It consists of a nave with a north porch, and a chancel with a north vestry and organ chamber. On the west gable of the church is a double bellcote.	II
All Saints Church	Ryde, Isle of Wight; 50.7274°N 1.1669°W		1867–72	An apsed vestry was added to the south of the church in 1891. The church is built in rubble stone, with ashlar dressings. It consists of a nave, aisles, a chancel, and a tall northeast steeple.	II*
St Denys' Church	St Denys, Southampton, Hampshire; 50.9247°N 1.3831°W		1868	The church is in Early English style, and is built in red brick with stone dressings. It consists of a nave, aisles (the south aisle was added in 1889), and a chancel with chapels and an apse. The windows are lancets, and above the east end of the nave is a gabled open bellcote.	II
St Michael's Church	Highclere, Hampshire; 51.3401°N 1.3695°W		1870	St Michael's Church is in Early English style, it is built in flint with stone dressings, and it has a roof of red tile. It consists of a nave, a south aisle, a north porch, a chancel, and a north steeple. The steeple has a tower with stepped buttresses, triple lancets in the bell stage, and a shingled broach spire.	II*
St Lawrence's Church	St Lawrence, Isle of Wight; 50.5865°N 1.2419°W		1878	St Lawrence's Church is in sandstone with a tile roof and terracotta ridge tiles. It consists of a nave, a north aisle with a north porch, and a chancel with a north vestry. On the west gable of the nave is a gabled double bellcote. The east window has five lights, and contains Geometric tracery.	II*
