= St Michael and All Angels' Church, Heavitree, Exeter =

St Michael and All Angels' Church
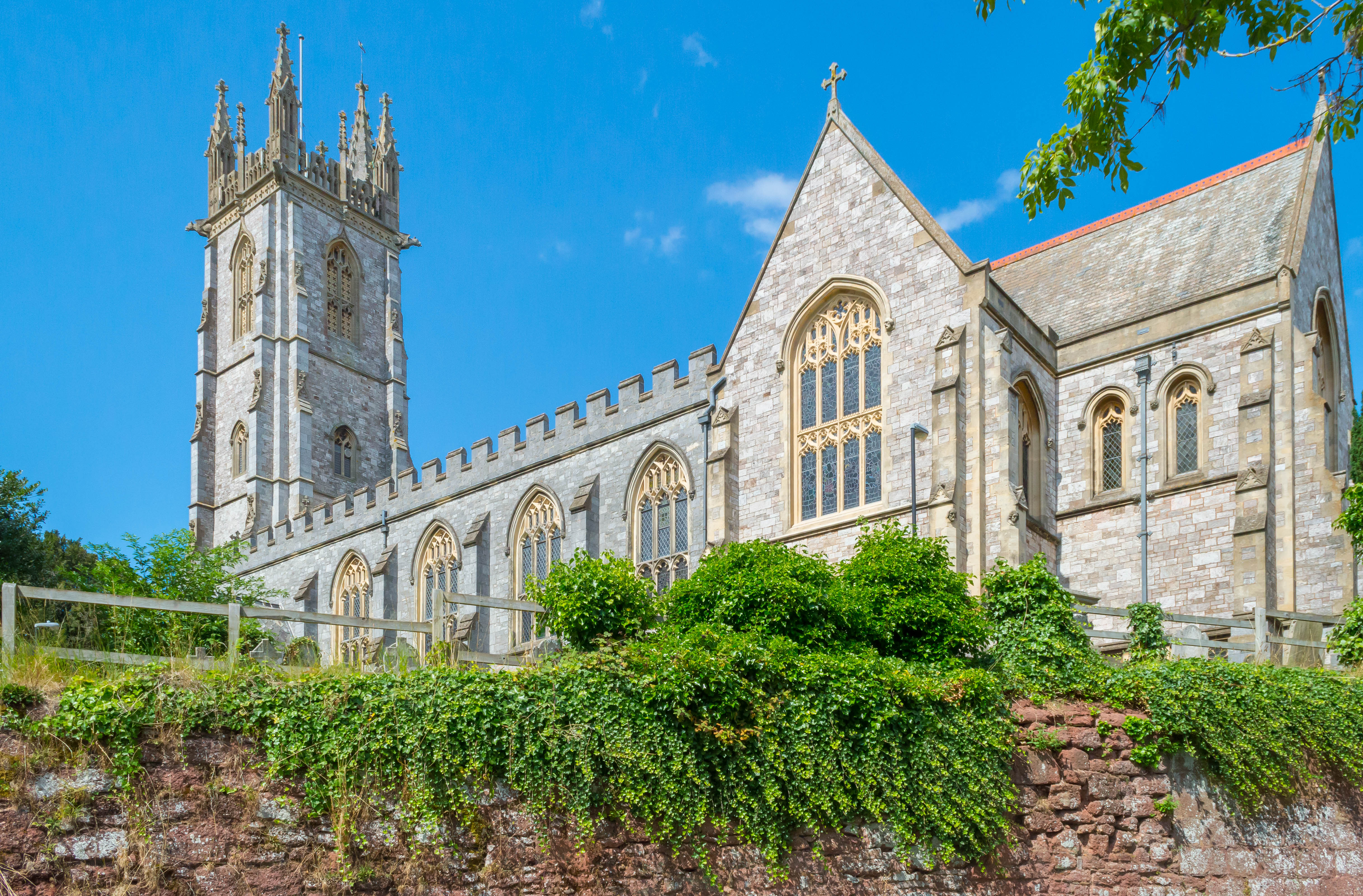
- Church of St Michael & All Angels from the south-east

- Location in Devon
- 50.72025°N 3.50667°W
- Location: Heavitree, Exeter, Devon
- Denomination: Church of England

History
- Dedication: Archangel Michael

Architecture
- Heritage designation: Grade II* listed
- Designated: 29 January 1953
- Architect(s): David Mackintosh and Edward Hall Harbottle
- Style: Gothic Revival
- Years built: 1844-1898
- Construction cost: £6,155 (1887)

Administration
- Province: Canterbury
- Diocese: Exeter
- Archdeaconry: Exeter
- Deanery: Christianity
- Benefice: Heavitree and St Mary Steps
- Parish: Heavitree with St Paul, Exeter

The Church of St Michael and All Angels is the main Church of England parish church for the suburb of Heavitree, located in the city of Exeter, Devon. The present building is a large and imposing Gothic Revival structure dating back to the 19th century but there has been a church on the site since Saxon times. Designated as a Grade II* listed building by Historic England, the church is notable for its Victorian architecture, tall tower and proximity to the 'Heavitree Yew', an ancient common yew tree within the churchyard amongst the oldest in the county.

== History ==
The earliest record of a church on the site is in a grant to Exeter Cathedral in 1152, but a church is likely to have existed on the site since the late Saxon era. The church was extensively rebuilt in the 14th and 15th centuries, the tower following in 1541. This church was built out of local Heavitree stone, a distinctive red sandstone seen in many churches in Devon.

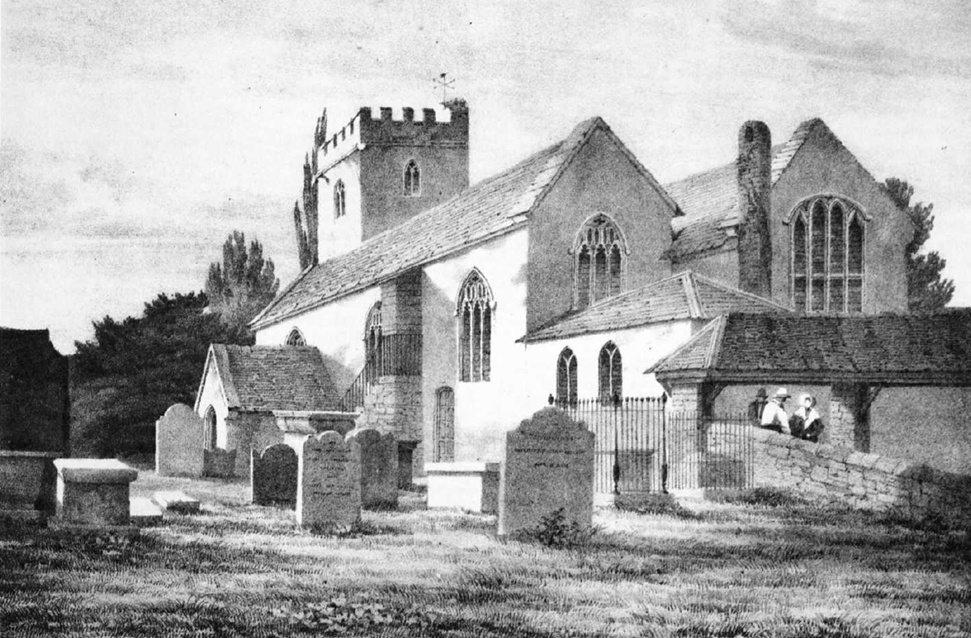
A lithograph of the medieval church in 1842.

No further work is recorded on the church building until the 19th century, when it was found the church building was to small for the growing population. The building, with the exception of the tower, was pulled down and rebuilt from 1844 to 1846. The designer for this new church was David Mackintosh, a Scottish architect then living in Exeter. The new building (the present church), built from grey Devon limestone, cost £3,000 (equivalent to more than £350,000 in 2020), which was largely raised by public subscription and a £500 grant from the Church Building Society. Whilst the majority of the building was newly built, the old nave piers were incorporated into the design of the new church.

This new building was not without problems, for only two years after construction finished, the building had to be closed due to the rotting of the timber floor, which in turn was causing noxious vapours from the bodies in the churchyard to rise up into the building. The timber floor was ripped up and a new concrete floor installed in its place.

Due to a shortage of funds at the time of the construction of the main body of the church, the 16th-century tower of the previous church was for nearly four decades joined to the body of Mackintosh's church. In the late 1880s, funds became available for the competition of the church with the intended tower. Several local architects tendered for the job; the winning entry was by Edward Hall Harbottle. The scheme to build the tower was intended to mark the Golden Jubilee of Queen Victoria in 1887. Harbottle's tower was completed in 1887, with an inscription at its base commemorating her Golden Jubilee. The tower cost more money to construct than the rest of the church combined, some £3,155 (£425,000 in 2020).

Harbottle also returned to the church in 1893 to enlarge the chancel, a scheme which lasted until 1898. The building was constructed with extensive galleries along the nave, though these were removed in 1924 when the roof was restored.

== Architecture ==
The church is a local landmark, situated on a steep hill above much of the suburb, its tall tower is able to be seen from much of the city. The building, designed in the Gothic Revival style with Perpendicular Gothic influences, is formed of six-bay nave, with aisles and western tower, north and south transepts, and a two-story chancel. There is a simple embattled parapet round the nave aisles, the eastern arm being a plain parapet. The church has an area of 821 square metres (8,840 sq ft), which according to the Church of England, makes it a 'large' sized church building.

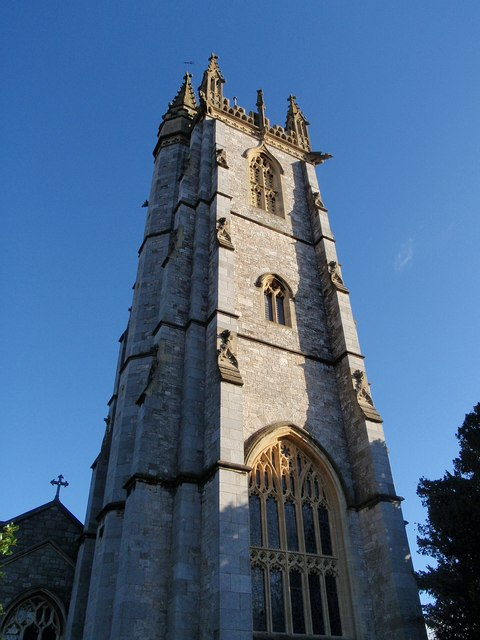
The lofty Somerset-style western tower, showing the stair turret and west window.

Similar to the Perpendicular Gothic style from which Mackintosh took the design, the church features large windows; that of nave aisles being three-light windows divided by transoms. The north and south transept feature similar windows, formed of four-lights rather than three, also divided by transoms. The east window is of five-lights, placed high on the wall near the gable end. The larger west window, situated in the lower two stories of the tower, is formed of five lights, divided by transoms and mullions, with more intricate tracery in its upper section.

The glory of the exterior is its lofty and highly decorative tower, based on the celebrated Gothic towers of Somerset from which it shares many features. The tower is formed of four stories, the lower two open to the church, and topped by an elaborate series of crocketed pinnacles, resembling the design at Chewton Mendip and Glastonbury. The tower's upper stage has two-light belfry windows with pierced stone quatrefoil panels, common in Somerset, rather than the traditional louvres. An octagonal stair turret ascends the centre of the north face, culminating in a short stone spire above the parapet.

The interior, featuring the old Gothic arcade, is light and lofty. Featuring large aisled windows, whitewashed walls and a fine barrel-vaulted ceiling. The arcades between the nave and aisles are decorated with angels and shields, with the piers themselves being lozenge-shaped. There is a fine octagonal font with figures of angels supporting the basin. The pulpit, like the font dating from the 1846 rebuilding, is carved from stone, depicting the Four Evangelists and Saint Michael. There is a decorative screen dating back to the 1870s, brought from Exeter Cathedral in 1939; built from marble and alabaster; and the centrepiece represents the ascension of Christ with twelve apostles. The left panel shows The Transfiguration and on the right is the descent of the Holy Spirit with the apostles and the three Mary's.

== Organ ==
The organ, situated in the north transept, is a large and significant historic instrument originally constructed in 1896 by Hele & Co of Saltash, Cornwall. It was overhauled in 1926 by the same firm, and again in 1955 by John Compton, who converted the instrument to electric action. The instrument was enlarged in 1978 and again in 1990. The organ now has three manuals and 42 speaking stops. It has been heavily modernised in recent years.

== Bells ==
Prior to the building of the present tower in 1887, the church had four bells. This ring of four was formed of one medieval bell and three others cast by the Pennington foundry in 1667. One of the bells was recast in 1869 as it had cracked. These four bells were taken down and recast with additional metal into the present ring of eight by John Taylor & Co of Loughborough in 1897. Some sixteen bell foundries tendered for the job of casting the new bells. The cost of the new octave was £825 17s 5d, and the bells were given by the parishioners to celebrate the Diamond Jubilee of Queen Victoria. The bells were first dedicated on 24 December 1897, by the then Bishop of Crediton, Robert Trefusis.

The bells received major maintenance in 1966, when John Taylor & Co returned to dismantle and restore the fittings before rehanging the peal in the existing cast iron frame on new ball bearings. It had been hoped at the time to augment the bells to a ring of ten but due to lack of funds, this was never achieved.

With the tenor weighing some 25 and three quarter hundredweight (1,309 kg), they are one of the heaviest rings in the county, and second in Exeter only to the cathedral. The bells are considered to be amongst the finest in the country, in part due to the excellent acoustic properties of the tower, which was designed specifically to contain a peal of change ringing bells. They are popular with visiting bands, and the present bells have had more than 100 full peals rung on them since their first in 1898.

The bells and the frame they hang in are listed for preservation as an "exemplary example of the founders' work". Only five other rings of eight or more bells in the country by John Taylor & Co are listed, which are the octaves of Cliffe at Hoo, Kent; Norton, Sheffield; Thrapston, Northamptonshire; Tushingham, Cheshire; and Westbury, Wiltshire.
