= Pinhoe =

Suburb of Exeter, Devon, England

Coordinates: 50.74069°N 3.46717°W

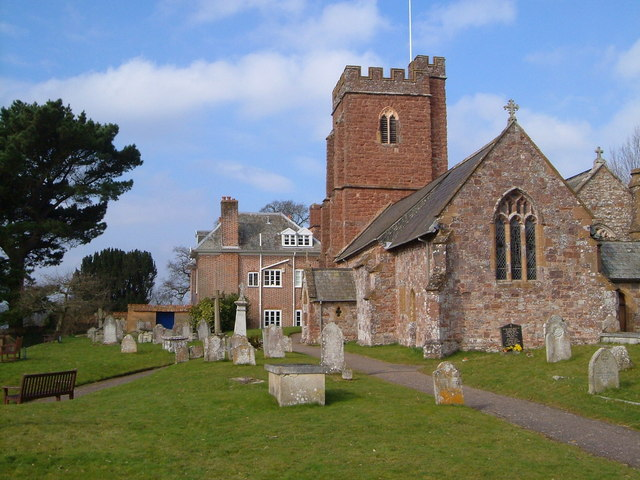
- St Michael's Church

- Pinhoe district ward in Exeter

- Location within Devon
- Population: 6,454
- OS grid reference: SX9594
- District: Exeter
- Shire county: Devon
- Region: South West
- Country: England
- Sovereign state: United Kingdom
- Post town: EXETER
- Postcode district: EX1 and EX4
- Dialling code: 01392
- Police: Devon and Cornwall
- Fire: Devon and Somerset
- Ambulance: South Western
- UK Parliament: Exmouth and Exeter East

Pinhoe is a former village, manor and ecclesiastical parish, now a suburb on the north eastern outskirts of the City of Exeter in the county of Devon, England. The 2001 census recorded a population of 6,108 people resident within Pinhoe Ward, one of 18 wards comprising the City of Exeter. The population increased to 9,588 at the 2021 Census.

== History ==
Historically Pinhoe formed part of Wonford Hundred. It falls within Aylesbeare Deanery for ecclesiastical purposes. A parish history file is held in Pinhoe Library.

Pinhoe is mentioned as 'Pinnoch' in the Great Domesday Book compiled in 1086.

There have been several significant archaeological finds in the village over the past 100 years. These have included Roman coins and what is known as 'the Pinhoe hoard' of Bronze Age metalwork found in 1999.

In 1001, the Danes, having landed at Exmouth, marched to Exeter, which they besieged, but unable to take the settlement, they laid waste to the surrounding country. At Pinhoe, they were confronted by Cola, the Saxon King Ethelred's commander-in-chief, with a hastily assembled force: the Danes were victorious. The actual site of the battle is said to be in or near Mincimore copse. The day after the battle, the invading Vikings burnt Pinhoe, Broad Clyst, and other neighbouring villages. In 2001, the battle was commemorated in the village by a series of military re-enactments, a Viking-themed children's parade and summer fete.

The local community centre – America Hall – is linked to a more recent conflict. It was built with funds donated by the families and friends of American Service persons who were stationed in and around Pinhoe during the Second World War in recognition of the community's hospitality. The National Blood Service used to run blood donor sessions at America Hall several times each year; these ended in Autumn 2013.

The population of the civil parish in 1801 stood at 351, and had increased to 952 by 1901 and 3431 in 1961.

Pinhoe became part of St Thomas Rural District in 1894, on 1 April 1966 the parish was abolished and merged with Exeter and Broad Clyst and became part of the County Borough of Exeter.

== Geography ==
Overlooking the village sits St. Michael and All Angels Church in its current form, largely dating from the 15th Century. It is set in a neat church yard with an attractive 17th Century, thatched lychgate and a good view of Exeter.

The village's other amenities include one pub, a primary/junior school rebuilt in 2006, popular pre-school – in a brand new building from September 2008 but still on the same site at Pinhoe School, doctor's surgery, several shops, an estate agency, sub-Post Office, pharmacy, two Chinese takeaways, an Italian restaurant, and two hairdressers. In November 2013, there was a proposal from a housing developer to destroy the village centre and create a large roundabout rather than the current joined mini-roundabouts. This proposal would have involved the loss of the Po Lee Chinese takeaway and the recently restored historic Poltimore Arms pub and caused a public outcry, however the pub was later demolished anyway to make way for a future retail unit.

For several years, the annual Great West Run (half marathon) has extended out to Pinhoe. The toughest part of the course used to be the uphill section along Chancel Lane, the most easterly part of the course, which competitors had to tackle twice during the race. The change to the route in 2006 retained the 'Pinhoe loop' but only as part of the first lap. To the relief of most runners, the route went down Chancel Lane. In 2013, the Run transferred to new organisers, was rebranded as Exeter's Great West Run and became a single loop event beginning and ending in Exeter City Centre. The closest that the course comes to Pinhoe is a switch-back near Sainsbury's on Pinhoe Road.

== Transport ==
Pinhoe station lies on the main rail route from Exeter St Davids station to London Waterloo. It is unstaffed. During the Autumn of 2007, much of the undergrowth behind platform 1 – Eastbound (Honiton/London) – was cleared to improve station security. In September 2008, a ticket machine was installed on platform 2. New shelters, security cameras and dot matrix departure boards have also been installed. Journey times to London are typically around 3 hours 20 minutes. The service is operated by South Western Railway.

A link road costing £3.9m opened in December 2006; this created a route to the Met Office, Sowton Industrial Estate, and onwards to junction 29 of the M5 motorway and Exeter Airport.

== Recent development ==
The much-delayed new household waste recycling centre off Exhibition Way (near Aldi) was opened by Devon County Council on 21 June 2011. This is known as the Pinbrook recycling centre and cost £3.8m to construct. It is intended to serve the east of Exeter, Pinhoe and communities further east. In 2012, the site was named as Recycling Centre of the Year in the Letsrecycle.com awards.

There are several significant housing development proposals for Pinhoe. These include the redevelopment of the clay pit off Harrington Lane and the former brick works off Chancel Lane. These follow the development of the former coldstore site off Chancel Lane; called 'Chancel Park', this site was developed by Taylor Wimpey for high-density housing.

== Notable people ==
- John Rainolds (1549–1607), English Puritan academic and churchman
- Kevin Brooks (born 1959), British writer
