= List of new churches by George Gilbert Scott in South West England =

George Gilbert Scott (1811–78) was an English architect. Following his training, in 1836 he started working with William Bonython Moffatt, and they entered into partnership, initially specialising in designing workhouses. Scott became increasingly interested in the Gothic style, and the design of churches in this style. The partnership was dissolved in 1846, and Scott then set up his own office. He became "known primarily as a church architect", and as such he designed many new churches, and restored many more. In addition he designed monuments and memorials, public buildings including government offices, educational buildings, commercial buildings, and houses.

This list contains new churches designed by Scott in the South West England region. It is not complete, not least because some of the churches have been demolished.

== Key ==
Grade	Criteria
Grade I	Buildings of exceptional interest, sometimes considered to be internationally important.
Grade II*	Particularly important buildings of more than special interest.
Grade II	Buildings of national importance and special interest.

== Churches ==
Name	Location	Photograph	Date	Notes	Grade
St Paul's Church	Chudleigh Knighton, Devon; 50.5847°N 3.6321°W		1841–42	The church was designed with Moffatt. It is built in flint pebbles with limestone dressings and slate roof. The church consists of a nave, north and south transepts, and a chancel. On the west gable is a gabled bellcote. The windows are lancets, and there are three stepped lancets in the east and the west walls.	II
Holy Trinity Church	Shaftesbury, Dorset; 51.0060°N 2.1990°W		1841–42	Holy Trinity Church was designed with Moffatt, it is in Early English style, and the chancel was later rebuilt. The church is built in greensand and has blue slate roofs. It consists of a nave, aisles, west porches, east transepts, a chancel, and a west tower. The tower has four stages, a polygonal northwest stair turret with a spirelet, pinnacles on the other corners, and an embattled parapet. The church was made redundant in 1977, and has been converted for other uses.	II
St Peter's Church	Swallowcliffe, Wiltshire; 51.0434°N 2.0532°W		1842–43	The church was designed with Moffatt, and is in Neo-Norman style. It is built in limestone with tile roofs, and consists of a nave, aisles, a south transept, a chancel, and a south tower. The tower has angle buttresses and string courses, and at the top is a Lombard frieze, a corbel table, and an embattled parapet. In its east angle is a stair turret with a square base, becoming cylindrical, and with a conical roof.	II*
St Martin's Church	Zeals, Wiltshire; 51.0848°N 2.3145°W		1842–46	The spire was added to the church in 1876, which is in Decorated style, and built in limestone with a tile roof. The church consists of a nave, a south porch, a chancel with a north vestry, and a west steeple. The steeple has a three-stage tower with buttresses, a south polygonal stair turret, and pinnacles on the second stage. The bell stage is octagonal, and has a cornice with gargoyles. On the tower is a recessed spire with gabled lucarnes and a moulded finial.	II*
Christ Church	Nailsea, North Somerset; 51.4336°N 2.7611°W	—	1843	The church was designed with Moffatt and is in Early English style. It is built in sandstone with limestone dressings and slate roofs. The church consists of a nave with a south porch, a north vestry, and a chancel with a north organ chamber. On the west gable is a bellcote.	II
St Mark's Church	Swindon, Wiltshire; 51.5612°N 1.7947°W		1843–45	The church was designed with Moffatt and is in Decorated style. It is built in limestone, the nave roof is tiled and the aisles have lead roofs. In 1897 Temple Moore added a chancel with a south chapel and a north vestry. The rest of the church consists of a nave with a clerestory, aisles, a south porch, and a north steeple. The steeple is 140 feet (43 m) high, it has a four-stage tower with angle buttresses, a north doorway, and a crocketed spire with lucarnes.	II
Holy Trinity Church	Chantry, Somerset; 51.2217°N 2.4035°W		1844–46	Designed with Moffatt, the church is in early Decorated style. It is built in Doulting stone with a roof of lead sheet, and consists of a nave and a chancel, both decorated with gargoyles and angels, and a south porch. At the west end are lancet windows flanking a central buttress that rises to form a polygonal bell turret, with openings having ogee heads, and surmounted by a crocketed spire. The east window has three lights and contains geometric tracery.	I
Holy Trinity Church	Cirencester, Gloucestershire; 51.7111°N 1.9636°W	—	1847–51	The windows were enlarged by Scott in 1878. The church is in limestone with stone slate roofs, and consists of a nave with aisles, a chancel with aisles and a south vestry, and a northwest steeple. The steeple has a tower with buttresses, a ballflower frieze, gargoyles, and a parapet with moulded coping. On the tower is a broach spire with lucarnes.	II*
Woolland Church	Woolland, Dorset; 50.8619°N 2.3195°W		c. 1851	The church does not have a known dedication, and is built in rubble with ashlar dressings and slate roofs. It consists of a nave, a south porch, a south chapel and vestry, and a chancel with an apse. On the west gable is an octagonal three-stage bell turret with lancets in the middle stage, and surmounted by an iron cross.	II
Christ Church	Swindon, Wiltshire; 51.5538°N 1.7744°W		1851	Christ Church is in early Decorated style, and is built in sandstone with Bath stone dressings and slate roofs. It consists of a nave, aisles, transepts, a chancel with an organ chamber and a Lady chapel (added later), and a west steeple. The steeple has a three-stage tower with corner buttresses, a west gabled porch, and a broach spire with lucarnes.	II*
St Paul's Church	Chippenham, Wiltshire; 51.4647°N 2.1176°W		1853–61	The church is in Early English style, the tower is built in limestone, the rest of the church is in rubble with freestone dressings, and the roof is in stone slate. The plan consists of a nave with a clerestory, aisles, a chancel with a north vestry, and a steeple at the southeast end of the south aisle. The steeple is 57 metres (187 ft) high, and consists of a four-stage tower with diagonal buttresses, a south doorway, a clock face in the third stage, a corbel table and a parapet, and a broach spire. Attached to the church are walls, gates and piers that are included in the listing.	II*
St Mary's Church	Flaxley, Forest of Dean, Gloucestershire; 51.8358°N 2.4535°W		1856	The church is in stone with a tiled roof, and consists of a nave, a north aisle, a south timber porch, a chancel with an organ chamber, and a steeple at the west end of the aisle. The steeple has a square three-stage tower, with a stair turret, and a broach spire that has gabled clock faces on the north and south faces.	II*
St John the Evangelist's Church	Taunton. Somerset; 51.0136°N 3.1086°W		1858–63	The exterior is built in a variety of Somerset stones, and inside is Caen stone and Devonshire marble. The roofs are in brown tile with red tile diapering. The church consists of a nave, aisles, a south porch, a north chapel, a chancel, and a steeple at the east end of the south aisle. The steeple is 80 feet (24 m) high and has a tower with buttresses and a broach spire. The spire is decorated with bands of polychrome stone, it has tabernacles containing statues of the apostles hiding the broaches, and higher up the spire is a tier of lucarnes.	I
Holy Trinity Church	Gloucester; 51.8616°N 2.2382°W	—	1874–75	In 1887 a vestry was added to the church, which is in stone with tiled roofs. It consists of a nave with a clerestory, aisles, a south porch, and a chancel with a south chapel and a north vestry and organ chamber. At the west end of the nave is a six-light window with Geometrical tracery, this is flanked by buttresses, and there is a three-light window in west end of the aisles.	II
