= Westlinton =

Village and civil parish in Cumbria, England

Coordinates: 54.971°N 2.948°W

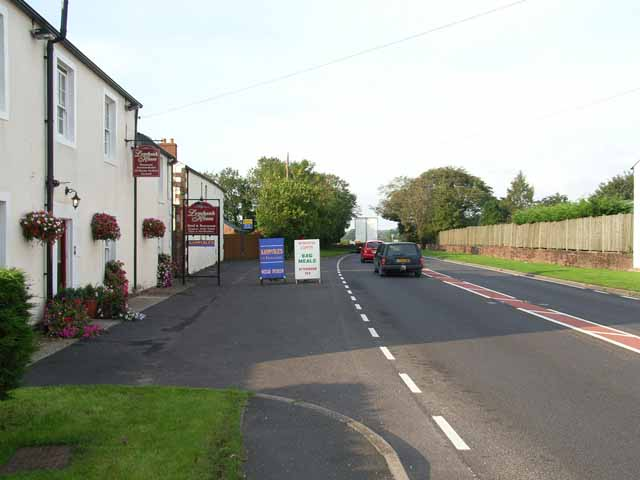
- Lynebank House Hotel, Westlinton

- Location within Cumbria
- Population: 350 (2021)
- OS grid reference: NY393645
- Civil parish: Westlinton
- Unitary authority: Cumberland
- Ceremonial county: Cumbria
- Region: North West
- Country: England
- Sovereign state: United Kingdom
- Post town: CARLISLE
- Postcode district: CA6
- Dialling code: 01228
- Police: Cumbria
- Fire: Cumbria
- Ambulance: North West
- UK Parliament: Carlisle

Westlinton (or West Linton) is a small village and civil parish in Cumbria, England. It is in the Cumberland district, and is located north of Carlisle, on the A7 road between Carlisle and Longtown. In the south of the parish, and also on the A7, is another small village, Blackford. In the 2001 census, the parish had a population of 359, increasing to 380 at the 2011 census. decreasing again to 350 in 2021. North of the village of Westlinton is the River Lyne, which forms the northern boundary of the parish.

== See also ==
- Listed buildings in Westlinton
