= East Sussex Cricket Ground =

Sports venue in St Leonards-on-Sea, England

Coordinates: 50.85256°N 0.53095°E

Ground information
- Location: St Leonards-on-Sea, Sussex
- Establishment: 1857 (first recorded match)

Team information
Sussex	(1857)
- As of 27 August 2010; Source: Ground profile

East Sussex Cricket Ground was a cricket ground in St Leonards-on-Sea, Sussex. The ground was located at the site of a racecourse which had moved after 1826 from the Bulverhythe Salts. It was during its time regarded as one of the finest racecourses in the United Kingdom.

The first recorded match on the ground was in 1857, when Sussex played the Marylebone Cricket Club in the grounds only first-class match. The final recorded match held on the ground came in 1894 when the South Saxons played the Gentlemen of the Netherlands, a Netherlands side which contained the famous Carst Posthuma.
