= List of new churches by George Gilbert Scott in London =

George Gilbert Scott (1811–78) was an English architect. Following his training, in 1836 he started working with William Bonython Moffatt, and they entered into partnership, initially specialising in designing workhouses. Scott became increasingly interested in the Gothic style, and the design of churches in this style. The partnership was dissolved in 1846, and Scott then set up his own office. He became "known primarily as a church architect", and as such he designed many new churches, and restored many more. In addition he designed monuments and memorials, public buildings including government offices, educational buildings, commercial buildings, and houses.

This list contains new churches designed by Scott in the Greater London region. It is not complete, not least because some of the churches have been demolished.

== Key ==
Grade	Criteria
Grade II*	Particularly important buildings of more than special interest.
Grade II	Buildings of national importance and special interest.

== Churches ==
Name	Location	Photograph	Date	Notes	Grade
St John's Church	Shirley, Croydon; 51.3712°N 0.0496°W		1836	St John's Church is in flint with stone dressings. It consists of a nave with a clerestory, aisles, a chancel, and a south chapel that which was added later. At the west end is a bell turret.	II
St Peter's Church	Kingston upon Thames; 51.4108°N 0.2913°W	—	1840–41	A Commissioners' church designed with Moffatt in Norman style. It is built in yellow brick with dressings in white brick. The church consists of a nave, aisles, transepts, and a chancel also with aisles. At the west end of the north aisle is a four-stage square tower, and on top of the tower is a round turret with a conical spirelet. The windows are round-headed.	II
St Mary's Church	Hanwell, Ealing; 51.5138°N 0.3474°W		c. 1841	Designed with Moffatt, the church is in Early English style. It is built in flint with brick dressings. There is a northwest steeple with a broach spire.	II*
Christ Church	Turnham Green, Chiswick, Hounslow; 51.4921°N 0.2651°W		1841–43	The church was designed with Moffatt, and is in Early English style. Later the chancel was replaced and vestries were added. The church has knapped flint facing with limestone dressings, the spire is in red and black brick with ashlar dressings, and the roofs are in Welsh slate. It consists of a nave, aisles, a north porch, transepts, a chancel with a north chapel and vestries, and a west steeple. The steeple has a four-stage tower with angle buttresses, and a broach spire with two tiers of lucarnes.	II
St Giles' Church	Camberwell, Southwark; 51.4731°N 0.0869°W		1842–44	St Giles' Church was designed with Moffatt, and is built in Kentish ragstone with white ashlar dressings and a copper roof. The church has a cruciform plan, consisting of a nave with a clerestory, aisles, north and south porches, a north transept containing an organ chamber, a south transept with a Lady Chapel, and a chancel. At the crossing is a steeple with a two-stage tower and an octagonal spire.	II*
St Michael and All Angels Church	Wood Green, Haringey; 51.5994°N 0.1117°W		1843	The chancel and the steeple were added to the church in 1874. It is built in rubble masonry with freestone dressings, and is in the style of the 13th century. The church consists of a nave, aisles, a south porch, a chancel, and a south steeple.	II
Christ Church	Chipping Barnet, Barnet; 51.6587°N 0.2044°W		c. 1845–52	Christ Church is in Early English style, it is faced with flint, and has stone dressings, quoins and buttresses, and a tile roof. The church consists of a nave, a north aisle, a south timber porch, and a chancel. At the west end of the nave is a timber bellcote with a spirelet.	II
St John's Church	Wembley, Brent; 51.5527°N 0.3016°W	—	1846	Designed with Moffatt, the church in Early English style. Scott added the north aisle in 1859, and the south aisle was added in 1900. The church is built in flint with stone dressings and tiled roofs, and consists of a nave, aisles under separate gabled roofs, and a chancel. On the west gable is a shingled bellcote with a tiled roof.	II
St Peter's Church	South Croydon; 51.3634°N 0.0955°W		1849–51	The church is built with flint facings, stone dressings and tiled roofs. It consists of a nave, aisles, north and south porches, a chancel with a south chapel, and a west steeple. The steeple has a tower with clasping diagonal buttresses, and a shingled broach spire.	II
St Matthew's Church	Westminster; 51.4970°N 0.1308°W		1849–51	The church was built in ragstone with ashlar dressings, but was badly damaged by fire in 1982. The south tower has survived. This was intended to have a spire, but it was never built. The tower contains the main entrance to the former church, and has angle buttresses.	II
Church of Christ the King	Ealing; 51.5135°N 0.3050°W		1852	Additions were made to the church by G. F. Bodley and it was restored after bomb damage. The church is in Early English style, and is built in Kentish ragstone and Bath stone. It consists of a nave with a clerestory, aisles, a chancel, and a west steeple. Inside the church is a hammerbeam roof.	II*
Emmanuel Church	Forest Gate, Newham; 51.5463°N 0.0264°E		1852	Emmanuel Church is in Decorated style, and is built in Kentish ragstone with tiled roofs. It consists of a nave, aisles, a north transept with a turret, and a chancel with a north organ chamber and a south Lady Chapel. Above the chancel arch is a short tiled broach spire. The south aisle was added in 1890.	II
St Stephen's Church	Lewisham; 51.4642°N 0.0104°W	—	1856	St Stephen's Church in Early English style, and is built in rubble with freestone dressings and a tiled roof. The church has a cruciform plan consisting of a nave with a clerestory, aisles, a south transept, a north transept where a tower was planned but not built, and a chancel.	II
St Matthias' Church	Richmond upon Thames; 51.4567°N 0.2957°W		1858	The church is built in ragstone, and it consists of a nave with a clerestory, aisles, a chancel with an apse, and a northwest steeple. The steeple has a tower with buttresses, a traceried bell stage, a traceried parapet, and a tall octagonal broach spire. Above the porch at the west end is a wheel window, and along the clerestory are lancet windows.	II
Christ Church	Wanstead, Redbridge; 51.5776°N 0.0244°E	—	1860–61	The church is built in ragstone with ashlar dressings and slate roofs. It consists of a nave, aisles, a chancel, and a steeple. The steeple has a tower containing the entrance, and a broach spire with lucarnes.	II*
Christ Church	Southgate, Enfield; 51.6247°N 0.1280°W		1861–62	Christ Church is in Early English style, and is built in Kentish ragstone with dressings in Bath stone and slate roofs. It consists of a nave with a clerestory, aisles, a chancel with a northeast chapel and a southeast organ chamber and vestry, and a northwest steeple. The steeple has a tower incorporating a porch with a north doorway, angle buttresses, a northeast stair turret, a north clock face, and a broach spire with lucarnes.	II*
Christ Church	Harrow on the Hill; 51.5680°N 0.3432°W	—	1862	Christ Church is flint, brick and stone, and has slate roof with banding. It consists of transepts, and a chancel. Towards the west end of the nave is a spirelet containing a clock face. The windows in the clerestory are cinquefoils.	II
St Clement's Church	Barnsbury, Islington; 51.5455°N 0.1123°W	—	1864–65	The former church, now redundant, has been converted into flats. It is in brown and yellow brick with dressings of red and yellow brick and stone, and it has a slate roof. The church consists of a nave with a clerestory, aisles, a north porch, and a chancel with a northeast vestry. On the west gable is a gabled double bellcote.	II
St Andrew's Church	Uxbridge, Hillingdon; 51.5430°N 0.4735°W		1864–66	St Andrew's Church is in Decorated style, and is built in red and grey brick with stone dressings. It consists of a nave, aisles, a south porch, a chancel with a chapel, a northeast vestry (added in 1870), and a southeast steeple with a broach spire.	II
St Mary Abbots	Kensington High Street; 51.5024°N 0.1918°W		1869–72	The church was built to replace an earlier church on the site, and is in Geometrical style. It is built in rubble with ashlar dressings. The church consists of a nave with a clerestory, aisles, and a chancel at a lower level. At the east end is a steeple that has a tower with pinnacles, and a broach spire with lucarnes. The railings around the churchyard are included in the listing.	II*
