= Heavitree =

English village

Coordinates: 50.72139°N 3.50543°W

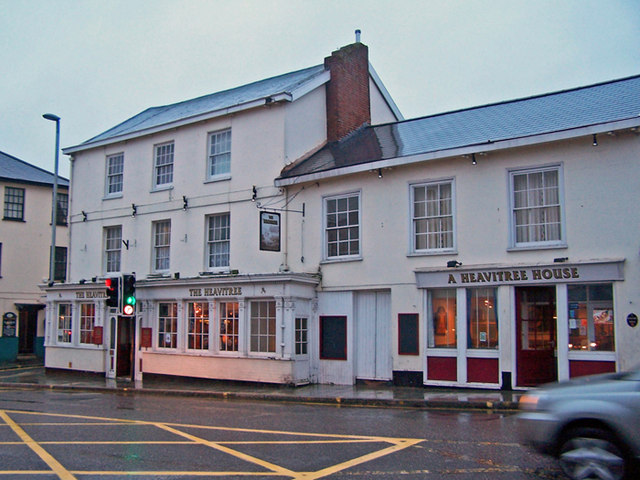
- The Heavitree public house in Fore Street. (The pub has reverted to its former name 'The Horse And Groom' since this photograph was taken.)

- Heavitree district ward in Exeter

- Location within Devon
- District: Exeter
- Shire county: Devon
- Region: South West
- Country: England
- Sovereign state: United Kingdom
- Post town: EXETER
- Postcode district: EX1
- Dialling code: 01392
- UK Parliament: Exeter

Heavitree is a historic village and former civil parish situated formerly outside the walls of the City of Exeter in Devon, England, and is today an eastern district of that city. It was formerly the first significant village outside the city on the road to London. It was the birthplace of the librarian Thomas Bodley, and the theologian Richard Hooker, and from the 16th century to 1818 was a site for executions within what is now the car park of the St Luke's Campus of the University of Exeter.

== History ==
The name appears in the Domesday Book of 1086 as Hevetrowa or Hevetrove, and in a document of c.1130 as Hefatriwe. Its derivation is uncertain, but because of the known execution site at Livery Dole, it is thought most likely to derive from heafod–treow (old English for "head tree"), which refers to a tree on which the heads of criminals were placed, though an alternative explanation put forward by W. G. Hoskins is that it was a meeting place for the hundred court.

The last executions for witchcraft in England took place at Heavitree in 1682, when the "Bideford Witches" Temperance Lloyd, Mary Trembles, and Susanna Edwards were executed. (Local folklore used to associate the name with the aftermath of the Monmouth Rebellion of 1685, when Judge Jeffreys supposedly ran out of gibbets.) The last execution to take place here was in 1818, when Samuel Holmyard was hanged at the Magdalen Drop for passing a forged one pound note.

In the hundred years from 1801 to 1901, the population of Heavitree grew from 833 to 7,529, reflecting its assimilation into the expanding city of Exeter. It first became an independent Urban District, but became a part of the city in 1913. Part of the historic district is still one of the wards for elections to the City Council.

In 1911 the parish had a population of 10,950. On 1 October 1928 the parish was abolished and merged with Exeter, Pinhoe, Topsham and Alphington.

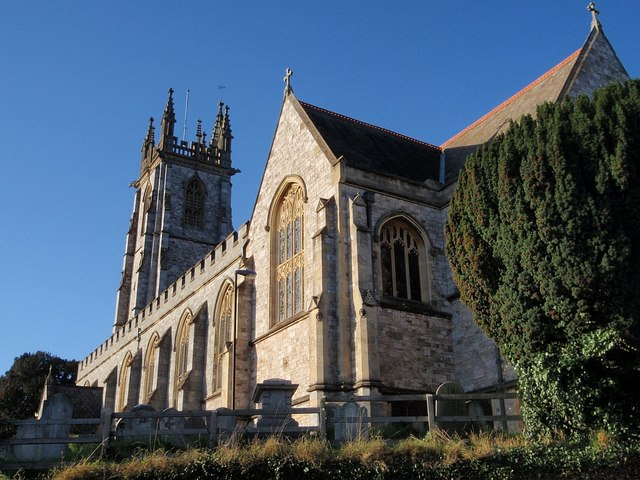
The church of St Michael and All Angels

The expanding population necessitated the rebuilding of the small medieval church and the church of St Michael and All Angels was built in 1844–46 to the design of architect David Mackintosh. Its most imposing feature is the west tower, built in 1890 to the design of E. Harbottle. In 2002, a yew tree in the churchyard was included among the " 50 Great British Trees" to celebrate the Golden Jubilee of Queen Elizabeth II. However, it is unlikely that this is the actual tree from which Heavitree gets its name.

The Heavitree Brewery was a local brewer, located in Heavitree; its history can be traced back to 1790. It was the last brewery in Exeter to cease production, continuing until 1970, the brewery buildings were demolished in 1980. The name continues in use as the owner of a chain of pubs in South West England, and Heavitree Brewery PLC continues as a quoted company with its address in Exeter. There is also a linked charitable trust.

== Recreation ==
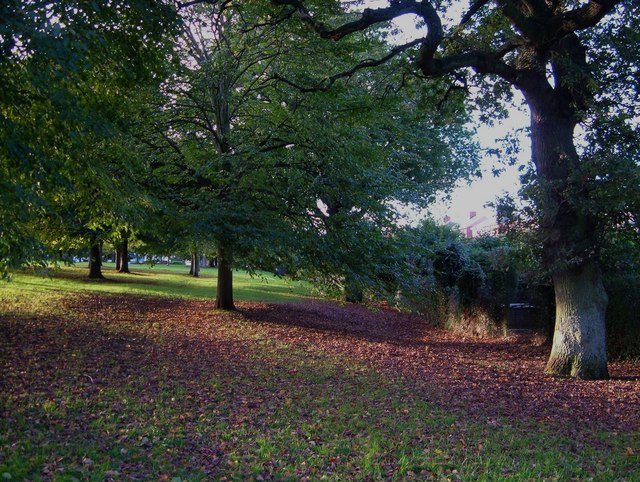
Part of Heavitree Pleasure Ground

By 1905 there was pressure to provide facilities for the youth of the district who were causing problems in Fore Street in the evenings, so at the end of that year the urban district council purchased four fields from a builder for £3,100 and opened a children's playground on 1 May 1906. The rest of the grounds were landscaped by the Veitch family, and a bowling green and tennis courts followed in 1907. Heavitree Pleasure Ground is still open today and contains a number of leisure facilities.

The district's football team, Heavitree Social United (a merger of the previous Heavitree United and Heavitree Social Club), is one of the better known local teams in Exeter, as of 2006 playing in the Devon and Exeter Football League Premier division; the club has previously played in the (more senior) Devon County League.

== Geography ==
Heavitree lies on one of the most convenient routes from the city centre to the northbound M5 motorway and eastbound A30 trunk road ensuring that much traffic continues to pass through the district. Its main thoroughfare is Fore Street, a shopping street which rises sharply to the former execution site of Livery Dole, now marked by almshouses and a small medieval chapel built of red Heavitree stone. From here, Heavitree Road runs downhill to Exeter city centre, passing the former main city Police Station on the right and St Luke's Hall, part of the University of Exeter, left. Heavitree is also the location of the Royal Devon and Exeter Heavitree Hospital.

Heavitree stone is a type of red sandstone that was formerly quarried in the area and was used to construct many of Exeter's older buildings, including Exeter Guildhall.

The Heavitree Gap, a pass through the MacDonnell Ranges in Australia, was named after Heavitree by the surveyor William Mills, who had attended Heavitree School in England. The Heavitree Gap adjoins the city of Alice Springs in Australia's Northern Territory.

== Climate ==
Climate data for Heavitree
Month	Jan	Feb	Mar	Apr	May	Jun	Jul	Aug	Sep	Oct	Nov	Dec	Year
Mean daily maximum °C (°F)	8.8 (47.8)	8.7 (47.7)	10.9 (51.6)	13.3 (55.9)	16.4 (61.5)	19.5 (67.1)	21.4 (70.5)	21.2 (70.2)	19.0 (66.2)	15.8 (60.4)	11.8 (53.2)	9.9 (49.8)	14.7 (58.5)
Mean daily minimum °C (°F)	3.2 (37.8)	3.1 (37.6)	4.1 (39.4)	5.6 (42.1)	8.3 (46.9)	11.2 (52.2)	13.0 (55.4)	13.0 (55.4)	11.2 (52.2)	9.1 (48.4)	5.5 (41.9)	4.2 (39.6)	7.6 (45.7)
Average precipitation mm (inches)	100 (3.9)	77 (3.0)	68 (2.7)	54 (2.1)	58 (2.3)	50 (2.0)	48 (1.9)	59 (2.3)	64 (2.5)	81 (3.2)	81 (3.2)	97 (3.8)	882.2 (34.73)
Average precipitation days (≥ 1.0 mm)	19	14	16	14	14	12	10	12	13	16	17	18	175
Mean monthly sunshine hours	58.3	74.4	116.6	160.8	195.3	200.3	204.0	186.5	143.9	99.1	76.2	58.3	1,573.6

== Politics ==
The area falls within the 'Heavitree and Whipton Barton' division for elections to Devon County Council, with the area named for the Whipton Barton house demolished in the 1950s.

For Exeter City Council, there is a specific Heavitree Ward.

== Notable people ==
- Sir Thomas Bodley, the founder of the Bodleian Library at Oxford University, was born in Heavitree.
- Samuel James Bouverie Haydon (1815–1891), sculptor
- Richard Hooker (1554–1600), whose writings were very influential in the Church of England in his own time and later, was born in Heavitree. There is a statue to Hooker in the grounds of Exeter Cathedral.
- James Ford (1836–1877), cricketer
- Ned Sanders (1852–1904), cricketer
- Primrose Pitman (1902–1998), artist
