= List of new churches by George Gilbert Scott in the English Midlands =

George Gilbert Scott (1811–78) was an English architect. Following his training, in 1836 he started working with William Bonython Moffatt, and they entered into partnership, initially specialising in designing workhouses. Scott became increasingly interested in the Gothic style, and the design of churches in this style. The partnership was dissolved in 1846, and Scott then set up his own office. He became "known primarily as a church architect", and as such he designed many new churches, and restored many more. In addition he designed monuments and memorials, public buildings including government offices, educational buildings, commercial buildings, and houses.

This list contains new churches designed by Scott in the English Midlands, more specifically in the West Midlands, and the East Midlands regions. It is not complete, not least because some of the churches have been demolished.

== Key ==
Grade	Criteria
Grade I	Buildings of exceptional interest, sometimes considered to be internationally important.
Grade II*	Particularly important buildings of more than special interest.
Grade II	Buildings of national importance and special interest.

== Churches ==
Name	Location	Photograph	Date	Notes	Grade
St Nicholas' Church	Lincoln, Lincolnshire; 53.2402°N 0.5376°W		1839	Designed with Moffatt, the church is in a mixture of Early English and Decorated styles. The baptistry and north aisle were added later. The church is built in stone and brick and the roof is slated. It consists of a nave and chancel with clerestories under a continuous roof, aisles, transepts, vestries, and a southwest steeple. The steeple has a three-stage tower with angle buttresses, a west doorway, and an octagonal spire with two tiers of lucarnes and a weathervane.	II
St John's Church	Wall, Staffordshire; 52.6577°N 1.8554°W		1839	The church was designed with Moffatt. It is in sandstone, and has tiled roofs with corbelled eaves. The church consists of a nave and chancel with a west steeple. The steeple has a three-stage tower on a plinth with diagonal buttresses. The top stage of the tower is chamfered to form the octagonal base for a spire that contains lucarnes.	II
Holy Trinity Church	Hartshill, Stoke-on-Trent, Staffordshire; 53.0097°N 2.2020°W		1842	Holy Trinity Church is in Decorated style, and was designed in conjunction with Moffatt. It is in stone with a tile roof, and consists of a nave with a clerestory, aisles, a chancel, and a west steeple. The steeple has four stages, clasping buttresses that rise to pinnacles, a west doorway, and a trefoil frieze below the parapet. It is surmounted by a spire with two tiers of lucarnes.	II*
St John the Baptist's Church	Westwood Heath, Coventry, West Midlands; 52.3840°N 1.5716°W		1842–43	The church was designed with Moffatt in Decorated style. It is built in freestone from a local quarry, and has a patterned tile roof. The church consists of a nave, a northwest porch, a chancel, and a southeast vestry. On the west gable is a brick bell turret. At the west end of the church is an attached church hall complex in sandstone that provides access to the church.	II
St Thomas the Apostle's Church	Penkhull, Stoke-on-Trent, Staffordshire; 53.0004°N 2.1964°W		1843	The church was designed with Moffatt, and the aisles were added in 1892. It is in sandstone with tile roofs and, as originally designed, consisted of a nave, transepts, a short chancel, and a west steeple. The steeple has a three-stage tower, and a broach spire with lucarnes. The windows in the transepts are paired lancets, and the east window has three lights containing Decorated tracery.	II
St Matthew's Church	Donnington Wood, Telford, Shropshire; 52.7148°N 2.4309°W	—	1843–44	The church is in Early English style, and built in Grinshill stone with tile roofs. It consists of a nave a south porch, north and south transepts, and a chancel. On the west gable of the nave is a gabled bellcote. The windows are lancets, and inside the church is a west gallery. A vestry and baptistry were added in 1965–66.	II
St Matthias' Church	Malvern, Worcestershire; 52.1290°N 2.3174°W	—	1844–46	The church was extended and altered in 1880–81, and the tower was added in 1899. It is built in local stone, and has tile roofs containing triangular lights. The church is in the style of about 1300 and its windows are lancets.	II
Holy Evangelists' Church	Normacot, Stoke-on-Trent, Staffordshire; 52.9789°N 2.1205°W		1846–47	The church was paid for by the Duke of Sutherland, and the north aisle was added in 1891–92. It is in early Decorated style, and is built in stone with tiled roofs. The church consists of a nave, aisles with a north porch, and a chancel with a south aisle chapel and a north vestry. There is a bellcote at the east end of the nave.	II
Holy Trinity Church	Boston, Lincolnshire; 52.9838°N 0.0151°W	—	1846–48	Holy Trinity Church is in Decorated style, and built in limestone with a Westmorland slate roof. It consists of a nave with a clerestory, aisles, a southwest porch, transepts, and a chancel. On the west gable is a bellcote with angel corbels.	II
St Peter's Church	Hixon, Staffordshire; 52.8274°N 2.0002°W		1848	St Peter's is built in stone, and is in Early English style. It consists of a nave and a chancel at a lower level. On the north side is a steeple with a broach spire.	II
Church of the Resurrection	Dresden, Staffordshire; 52.9782°N 2.1318°W		1853–63	The church was extended in 1873, 1903 and 1921, and is in Decorated style. It is built in red brick with blue brick diapering, and has a tiled roof. The church consists of a nave, aisles, and a chancel with a polygonal apse. At the western end of the chancel is a bellcote with a flèche.	II
St John's Church	Leicester, Leicestershire; 52.6303°N 1.1266°W		1854–55	St John's is in granite with limestone dressings, sandstone bands, and a slate roof. It consists of a nave with aisles, a south transept, a chancel with aisles and a polygonal apse, and a north tower. The tower is in three stages, and has angle buttresses, a northeast polygonal stair turret, and a plain parapet. At the west end is a doorway, above which is a row of five lancet windows and a rose window. The spire was removed in the 1950s, and the church converted into apartments in the late 1980s.	II
St Mary's Church	Hales, Staffordshire; 52.9024°N 2.4273°W		1856	St Mary's is in sandstone with tile roofs, and is in Decorated style. It consists of a nave with a south porch, a chancel, a north organ chamber, and a west tower. The tower is in three stages and has stepped angle buttresses, a southeast hexagonal stair turret, a cornice with gargoyles, and an embattled parapet.	II
St Mary's Church	Edvin Loach, Herefordshire; 52.2230°N 2.4958°W		1858–60	The church is in Early English style, and built in sandstone with limestone dressings and a tile roof. It consists of a nave and a chancel under a single roof, an apsidal east end, a south porch, a north vestry, and a west steeple embraced by the nave. The steeple has a tower with a west window, two-light bell openings, a corbel table, and a broach spire with lucarnes. The previous church stands to the east and is in ruins.	II
St Andrew's Church	Leicester, Leicestershire; 52.6282°N 1.1377°W		1860–62	St Andrew's is in red brick with patterning in blue brick and freestone, and it has slate roofs. The church is in Early English style, and has a cruciform plan, consisting of a nave with a south porch, transepts, and a chancel with an apse. Over the east end of the nave is a gabled bellcote. Inside the church the windows and arches are in buff brick with patterning in red and black brick. Attached to the north of the church is a former schoolroom later used as parish offices.	II*
All Saints Church	Nocton, North Kesteven, Lincolnshire; 53.1638°N 0.4150°W		1862	The church was designed for the Countess of Ripon. It is built in Ancaster stone, and has polychromatic dressings and a tile roof. The church consists of a nave, a south aisle, a south porch, a chancel, a vestry, and a northwest steeple. The steeple has a square three-stage tower with angle buttresses, an octagonal bell chamber, and an octagonal spire.	II*
All Saints Church	Sherbourne, Warwickshire; 52.2482°N 1.6173°W		1862–64	All Saints originated as an estate church. It is in stone with tile roofs, and consists of a nave with a clerestory, aisles, a chancel with a north organ chamber (added in about 1882 by John Oldrid Scott), a south chapel and vestry, and a northwest steeple. The steeple has buttresses that rise to polygonal pinnacles, a gabled belfry, and a tall thin spire.	II*
St Michael's Church	Welshampton, Shropshire; 52.9099°N 2.8423°W		1863	The church is in late Early English style, and is in sandstone with a patterned slate roof. It consists of a nave with a lean-to south aisle, a north porch, a chancel with a lean-to south vestry and an apsidal sanctuary. At the junction of the nave and the chancel is a bellcote.	II
St Peter's Church	Edensor, Derbyshire; 53.2256°N 1.6260°W		1867	St Peter's was built to replace an earlier church on the site. It is in sandstone and has Westmorland slate roofs with coped gables and ridges with cross finials. The church consists of a nave, aisles, north and south porches, a chancel with a north vestry and a southeast chapel, and a west steeple. The steeple has a four-stage tower with angle buttresses, a southeast stair turret, a north clock face, an arched corbel table, and a broach spire with canopied niches in the broaches, and with gabled and pinnacled lucarnes.	I
St Gabriel's Church	Hanley Swan, Worcestershire; 52.0830°N 2.2785°W		1872–74	St Gabriel's is a stone church with a slate roof, and is in the style of the late 13th century. It consists of a nave with a clerestory, aisles, a north timber porch, a chancel, and a northwest steeple. The steeple has a three-stage tower, with angle buttresses, and a broach spire with three tiers of lucarnes.	II
St Leonard's Church	Ludlow, Shropshire; 52.3715°N 2.7197°W		1873	A stone church, it has tiled roofs and coped gables. The church consists of a nave with a south porch, and a chancel, and is in Early English style. On the junction of the nave and the chancel is a double bellcote. At the east end is a triple lancet window above which is a rose window. The church is now redundant and is used for other purposes.	II
St Saviour's Church	Leicester, Leicestershire; 52.6381°N 1.1090°W		1875–77	St Saviour's Church is in red brick with stone dressings, a stone spire, and a slate roof with pierced ridge tiles. It consists of a nave with a clerestory, aisles, transepts, a chancel with an apse, a southeast chapel, a northeast vestry and organ chamber, and a steeple at the southwest. The steeple has a tower incorporating a porch, it has four stages, and is surmounted by a broach spire with two tiers of lucarnes.	II*
St Paul's Church	Spalding, Lincolnshire; 52.7971°N 0.1304°W		1877–79	The church and attached schoolroom, which are in Early English style, were completed after Scott's death by his son John Oldrid Scott. The building is in red brick with dressings, banding and a spire in Ancaster stone. The church has a lead roof and the roof of the schoolroom is tiled. The church consists of a nave with a clerestory, aisles, a southwest porch, a chancel with a northeast organ chamber and a southeast chapel, and a free-standing west steeple joined to the church by an arcaded walk. The church is linked to the former schoolroom by a corridor and a loggia. The steeple has a four-stage tower with angle buttresses rising to pinnacles with finials, and a tall spire with three tiers of lucarnes.	I
St Michael's Church	Stourport-on-Severn, Worcestershire; 52.34345°N 2.27348°W		1881	Building of the church was continued after Scott's death by John Oldrid Scott, but it was never completed, and was largely demolished in 1980. It is in brick with sandstone facing, and the remains consist of parts of the south and north walls, and the footings for the west wall. The south porch is gabled and flanked by crocketed niches. The north doorway is surrounded by Decorated tracery, and there are polygonal stair turrets to the northeast and southeast.	II
