= Letsrecycle.com =

UK-based website

letsrecycle.com
- Website type: News; waste management; recycling
- Owner: Roar B2B Ltd
- Website: letsrecycle.com
- Current status: Online

letsrecycle.com is a UK-based website reporting news and information related to the waste management and recycling industries. The website produces daily news and information and is one of the key providers of news in the UK waste industry.

== Overview ==
Letsrecycle carries a range of pricing information for recyclable materials including waste paper, scrap metal, plastics, glass, organics and wood. It is the UK's only independent dedicated website for businesses, local authorities and community groups involved in recycling and waste management. The site also welcomes comments on individual stories.

== Activities ==
The company is involved in a number of other dynamics in the waste industry, including the annual Local Authority Recycling Advisory Committee (LARAC) conference for local authorities and the Awards for Excellence in Recycling and Waste Management. It is widely cited as a place of reference by industry organisations, government and local authorities.

Its main event, previously held every two years at Stoneleigh Park near Coventry, is the RWM / Letsrecycle Live exhibition and conference, which will next be held in September 2024 at the NEC in Solihull.

As of February 2024, the editorial team consists of Joshua Doherty and Hayley Guest. Previous journalists include Will Date, Tom Goulding and Beth Slow. In 2010, letsrecycle.com added a YouTube account and Twitter account @letsrecycle. The website is published by The Environment Media Group Ltd.
