= Blackford, Cumbria =

Village in Cumbria, England

Coordinates: 54.950°N 2.942°W

Blackford
- Village
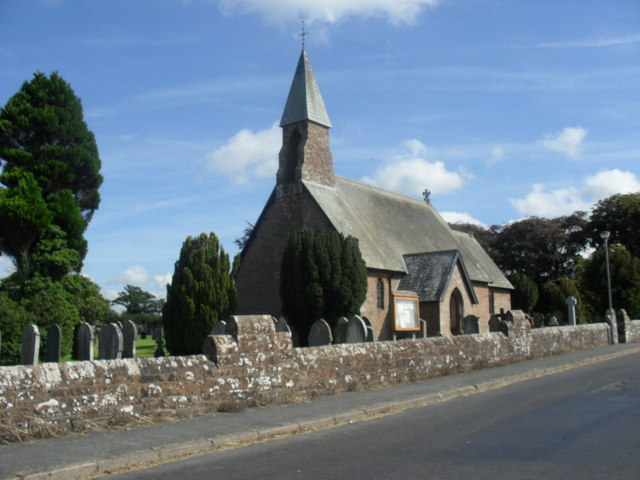
- St. John the Baptist's church, Blackford

- Location in the former City of Carlisle district Location within Cumbria
- OS grid reference: NY396621
- Civil parish: Westlinton
- Unitary authority: Cumberland
- Ceremonial county: Cumbria
- Region: North West
- Country: England
- Sovereign state: United Kingdom
- Post town: CARLISLE
- Postcode district: CA6
- Dialling code: 01228
- Police: Cumbria
- Fire: Cumbria
- Ambulance: North West
- UK Parliament: Carlisle

Blackford is a village in Cumbria, England, close to Gretna, Scotland.

== Toponymy ==
Blackford means what it says, a black ford or river-crossing. However, unlike other places of the name, it is a mix of Old English and Old Norse: the first element is Old English blǣc "black", while the second element is Old Norse vathr / vaőr, ford, river crossing, which usually occurs as -wath in place-names with this element (e.g. Wath upon Dearne). The name was recorded as Blakiwaith in 1165.

== See also ==
- Listed buildings in Westlinton
