= List of new churches by George Gilbert Scott in the East of England =

George Gilbert Scott (1811–78) was an English architect. Following his training, he started working with William Bonython Moffatt in 1836, and they entered into partnership, initially specialising in designing workhouses. Scott became increasingly interested in the Gothic style, and the design of churches in this style. The partnership was dissolved in 1846, and Scott then set up his own office. He became "known primarily as a church architect", and as such he designed many new churches, and restored many more. In addition he designed monuments and memorials, public buildings including government offices, educational buildings, commercial buildings, and houses.

This list contains new churches designed by Scott in the East of England region. It is not complete, not least because some of the churches have been demolished.

== Key ==
Grade	Criteria
Grade II*	Particularly important buildings of more than special interest.
Grade II	Buildings of national importance and special interest.

== Churches ==
Name	Location	Photograph	Date	Notes	Grade
St Mary Magdalene's Church	Flaunden, Hertfordshire; 51.6968°N 0.5350°W		1838	Scott's first church, it is in Early English style. The church is built in coursed flint with dressings in red brick and limestone. The copings are in sandstone, and the roof is in blue slate. The church is in a single cell, with a gabled south porch and a north vestry. At the west end is a wooden bell turret with a single-handed clock face, and a lead spire with a weathervane.	II
Holy Trinity Church	Halstead, Essex; 51.9435°N 0.6296°E		1843–44	The church was designed with Moffatt, and is in Early English style. The spire was rebuilt in 1846 following a collapse. The church is in brick, faced with coursed flint and with dressings in gault brick and limestone, and with roofs in slatewith ridge tiles. It consists of a nave with a clerestory, aisles, a chancel with a northeast organ chamber and vestry, and a southwest steeple. The steeple has a four-stage tower with clasping buttresses, a south doorway, and a broach spire with two tiers of lucarnes.	II*
St James' Church	Greenstead Green, Essex; 51.9249°N 0.6488°E	—	1845	St James' Church is in Decorated style. It is in flint and pebbles with limestone dressings and has a tiled roof. The church consists of a nave with a south timber framed porch, a chancel with a north vestry, and a west steeple. The steeple has a two-stage tower with angle buttresses, a southeast stair turret, an octagonal bell stage with crocketed pinnacles, miniature flying buttresses, and an octagonal spire in gault brick.	II
All Saints Church	Leavesden, Hertfordshire; 51.6955°N 0.3884°W	—	1853	The church is in Decorated style and built in flint and stone with tile roofs. It consists of a nave, a lean-to south aisle, a south porch, a chancel, and a west steeple. The steeple has a tower that rises through the roof of the nave, and has a bell stage with gabled bell openings and a broach spire; both the bell stage and the spire are shingled.	II
St John the Evangelist's Church	Bourne End, Hertfordshire; 51.7482°N 0.5296°W	—	1853	St John's is in Decorated style and built in flint with limestone dressings and a roof of scalloped red tiles. It consists of a nave and a chancel with a polygonal east end under one roof, a gabled north vestry and a timber framed south porch. Over the east end of the nave is a shingled flèche. On the flèche, porch and chancel are wrought iron crosses.	II
All Saints Church	Ridgmont, Bedfordshire; 52.0144°N 0.5794°W		1854–55	All Saints is a stone church with decorative bands of ironstone and clay tile roofs. It consists of a nave with a clerestory, aisles, a north porch, a chancel with a north organ chamber and vestry, and a west steeple. The steeple has a three-stage tower, a northeast octagonal stair turret, and a broach spire with lucarnes.	II*
All Saints Church	Debach, Suffolk; 52.1419°N 1.2759°E	—	1854–56	The church is redundant and has been converted into a house. It is built in rubble flint with ashlar dressings and a tile roof. The former church consisted of a nave and a chancel under a continuous roof.	II
St Stephen's Church	Higham, Forest Heath, Suffolk; 52.2608°N 0.5581°E		1861	St Stephen's is built in flint rubble with bands and dressings in limestone, and it has a tiled roof. The church consists of a nave, a north aisle, a chancel with a north organ chamber and vestry, and a west tower incorporating a baptistry. The tower is circular, it has arcading in the belfry stage, and a short shingled spire. The ceiling of the baptistry is vaulted.	II
St Mary's Church	Childwick Green, Hertfordshire; 51.7838°N 0.3476°W		1867	St Mary's is in red brick with some stone dressings and a tile roof. It consists of a nave and a chancel with one aisle, a south porch, and partly timbered gables. At the junction of the nave and the chancel is a shingled bellcote surmounted by a spike. To the rear of the church is a school hall linked to the church by a corridor.	II
St Mary Magdalene's Church	Guyhirn, Cambridgeshire; 52.6095°N 0.0625°E		1878	The church is in Early English style, and is built in gault brick with a tile roof. It consists of a nave with a south porch, and a chancel. At the west end is a gabled bellcote below which is a vesica-shaped window, and at the east end is a round window and three lancet windows.	II
