= William Bonython Moffatt =

British architect (1812–1887)

William Bonython Moffatt (1812 – 24 May 1887) was an architect, who for many years was a partner with Sir George Gilbert Scott at Spring Gardens, London.

Moffatt was the son of a small builder and pupil of James Edmeston. He was originally taken on by Scott to assist with drawings, and then as site architect on four Northamptonshire workhouses.

Moffatt died in 1887 at Summercourt, Cornwall aged 75. He was buried at St Enoder Church, Cornwall.
