= Grade II* listed buildings in Cumberland =

There are over 20,000 Grade II* listed buildings in England. This page is a list of these buildings in the district of Cumberland in Cumbria.

It is split by the three former districts which make up the unitary authority area, Allerdale, the Borough of Copeland and the City of Carlisle.

== Former Allerdale District ==
Name	Location	Type	Completed (Note: The date given is the date used by Historic England as significant for the initial building or that of an important part in the structure's description.)	Date designated	Grid ref. (Note: The grid reference is based on the British national grid reference system, sometimes known as OSGB36, used by the Ordnance Survey.) Geo-coordinates	Entry number (Note: The "List Entry Number" is a unique number assigned to each listed building and scheduled monument by Historic England.)	Image
Church of St Kentigern	Aspatria	Church	1846–48	11 April 1967	NY1471041916; 54°45′54″N 3°19′38″W	1234861	Church of St Kentigern More images
Church of St Bega	Bassenthwaite	Church	12th century	3 March 1967	NY2266228748; 54°38′52″N 3°12′00″W	1332957	Church of St Bega More images
Mirehouse	Bassenthwaite	House	Late 17th century	3 March 1967	NY2317828378; 54°38′41″N 3°11′31″W	1326263	Mirehouse More images
Table tomb south of chancel of Church of St Michael	Isel, Blindcrake	Table tomb	Late 15th century	5 September 1986	NY1625433303; 54°41′16″N 3°18′02″W	1312018	Upload Photo
Weary Hall	Mealsgate, Boltons	Farmhouse	Mid-16th century	11 April 1967	NY2178141836; 54°45′55″N 3°13′02″W	1137761	Upload Photo
Church of St Michael	Bowness-on-Solway	Church	12th century	11 April 1967	NY2237662646; 54°57′09″N 3°12′49″W	1137007	Church of St Michael More images
Fingland Farmhouse and adjoining barn	Fingland, Bowness	Farmhouse	Late 17th century	11 April 1967	NY2547157119; 54°54′12″N 3°09′50″W	1327125	Upload Photo
Parsonage Farmhouse	Brigham	Farmhouse	13th or 14th century	3 March 1967	NY0858430987; 54°39′56″N 3°25′08″W	1145197	Upload Photo
Hesket Hall Farmhouse	Hesket Newmarket, Caldbeck	Farmhouse	Mid- or late 17th century	11 April 1967	NY3397338646; 54°44′18″N 3°01′37″W	1144444	Hesket Hall Farmhouse More images
Castlegate House	Cockermouth	Detached house	Mid-18th century	28 August 1951	NY1234430839; 54°39′54″N 3°21′38″W	1327097	Upload Photo
Church of All Saints	Cockermouth	Church	1852–54	28 August 1951	NY1236430640; 54°39′47″N 3°21′37″W	1144744	Church of All Saints More images
Cobbled forecourt to Nos 45 and 47, Kirkgate	Cockermouth	House	Late 18th century	28 August 1951	NY1243830584; 54°39′46″N 3°21′32″W	1327064	Cobbled forecourt to Nos 45 and 47, Kirkgate
Norham House	Cockermouth	House	18th century	18 December 1969	NY1193830671; 54°39′48″N 3°22′00″W	1144717	Norham House
6 Castlegate	Cockermouth	House	Late 18th century	28 August 1951	NY1231330789; 54°39′52″N 3°21′40″W	1327096	6 Castlegate More images
5, 7 Castlegate	Cockermouth	House	Mid-18th century	28 August 1951	NY1228930787; 54°39′52″N 3°21′41″W	1373837	5, 7 Castlegate
38, 40 and 42 Market Place	Cockermouth	Cross passage house	Early–mid-16th century	26 July 1974	NY1225930745; 54°39′51″N 3°21′43″W	1327092	38, 40 and 42 Market Place
Crakeplace Hall	Ullock, Dean	Farmhouse	Mid-16th century	3 March 1967	NY0700424032; 54°36′10″N 3°26′28″W	1326884	Upload Photo
Church of St Mary	Gilcrux	Church	1836	3 March 1967	NY1173438176; 54°43′51″N 3°22′20″W	1275717	Church of St Mary More images
Mill Grove	Abbeytown, Holme Abbey	Former infirmary	Before 1472	1 April 1967	NY1774650693; 54°50′39″N 3°16′57″W	1212550	Upload Photo
Aisle columns west of Ireby Old Church	Ireby	Gate pier	13th century	3 January 1986	NY2237239311; 54°44′34″N 3°12′26″W	1146404	Upload Photo
Orthwaite Hall and adjoining barn	Orthwaite, Ireby and Uldale	Farmhouse	Late 16th or early 17th century	11 April 1967	NY2527234183; 54°41′50″N 3°09′40″W	1144419	Orthwaite Hall and adjoining barn More images
Church of St John	Keswick	Church	1838	2 October 1951	NY2678823181; 54°35′55″N 3°08′05″W	1144666	Church of St John More images
Church of St Kentigern	Great Crosthwaite, Keswick	Church	14th century	2 October 1951	NY2574124285; 54°36′30″N 3°09′04″W	1327118	Church of St Kentigern More images
The Moot Hall	Keswick	Moot hall	1571	2 October 1951	NY2663223436; 54°36′03″N 3°08′14″W	1137345	The Moot Hall More images
Church of St Bride	Kirkbride	Church	12th century	1 April 1967	NY2296057329; 54°54′17″N 3°12′11″W	1144617	Church of St Bride More images
Lilac House	Kirkbride	House	17th century	6 January 2011	NY2293656944; 54°54′05″N 3°12′12″W	1396397	Lilac House
Allanby House	Flimby, Maryport	House	1731	29 July 1950	NY0239433468; 54°41′12″N 3°30′56″W	1137677	Upload Photo
Flimby Hall	Flimby, Maryport	House	1766	29 July 1950	NY0239633503; 54°41′13″N 3°30′56″W	1137687	Upload Photo
Netherhall	Maryport	Country house	Mid- and late Georgian	29 July 1950	NY0432536908; 54°43′05″N 3°29′12″W	1137621	Upload Photo
Dovecote south of Church of St Cuthbert	Parsonby, Plumbland	Dovecote	16th century	13 August 1985	NY1417939159; 54°44′24″N 3°20′04″W	1217363	Dovecote south of Church of St Cuthbert
Church of St Mary	Churchtown, Sebergham	Church	Medieval	11 April 1967	NY3640841853; 54°46′03″N 2°59′24″W	1327246	Church of St Mary More images
Sebergham Hall	Sebergham	House	Late 17th century	3 January 1986	NY3636642442; 54°46′22″N 2°59′27″W	1144392	Upload Photo
Warnell Hall	Sebergham	Farmhouse	Early or mid-16th century	11 April 1967	NY3505241339; 54°45′46″N 3°00′39″W	1311727	Warnell Hall More images
Courtyard range and gatehouse with barn adjoining, Warnell Hall	Sebergham	Courtyard	Early 16th century	3 January 1986	NY3506741323; 54°45′45″N 3°00′38″W	1144400	Upload Photo
Hewthwaite Hall	Setmurthy	Farmhouse	1581	3 March 1967	NY1523832836; 54°41′00″N 3°18′58″W	1145129	Hewthwaite Hall More images
Millbeck Hall and adjoining barn	Millbeck, Underskiddaw	Farmhouse	1592	3 March 1967	NY2559526082; 54°37′28″N 3°09′14″W	1121974	Upload Photo
Fiddleback	West Woodside, Westward	Farmhouse	1709	11 April 1967	NY3073049170; 54°49′57″N 3°04′48″W	1311657	Fiddleback More images
Islekirk Hall	Westward	House	Mid-16th century	11 April 1967	NY2594344526; 54°47′24″N 3°09′12″W	1274096	Upload Photo
Jenkin's Cross	Westward	Farmhouse	Early 19th century	11 April 1967	NY2894447915; 54°49′16″N 3°06′27″W	1238648	Jenkin's Cross More images
Meadow Bank Farmhouse	West Curthwaite, Westward	Farmhouse	1666	11 April 1967	NY3238548926; 54°49′50″N 3°03′15″W	1144410	Upload Photo
Church of St Mary	Wigton	Church	1788	1 April 1967	NY2559948273; 54°49′26″N 3°09′34″W	1144590	Church of St Mary More images
Byres to north of Schoose Farm House	Schoose, Workington	Cow house	Early 19th century	13 December 1985	NY0146028044; 54°38′16″N 3°31′42″W	1138196	Upload Photo
Church of St John and adjoining community hall	Workington	Church	1822–23	6 June 1951	NY0043228499; 54°38′30″N 3°32′40″W	1138257	Church of St John and adjoining community hall More images
Church of St Michael	Workington	Church	12th century	6 June 1951	NX9973428956; 54°38′45″N 3°33′19″W	1144492	Church of St Michael More images
Granary east of Schoose Farmhouse	Schoose, Workington	Granary	c. 1800	13 December 1985	NY0150228002; 54°38′15″N 3°31′39″W	1144490	Upload Photo
Helena Thompson Museum and former stables	Workington	House	Late 18th century	6 June 1951	NY0087828563; 54°38′33″N 3°32′15″W	1311987	Upload Photo
Schoose Farmhouse and adjoining barns	Schoose, Workington	Farmhouse	c. 1800	13 December 1985	NY0142828018; 54°38′15″N 3°31′43″W	1144489	Upload Photo
St Michael's House	Workington	House	15th century	13 December 1985	NX9980728963; 54°38′45″N 3°33′15″W	1144478	Upload Photo
Windmill, adjoining barns, gatehouse and curtain wall	Schoose, Workington	Farm buildings	c. 1800	13 December 1985	NY0140427985; 54°38′14″N 3°31′45″W	1327213	Windmill, adjoining barns, gatehouse and curtain wall More images

== Former Borough of Copeland ==
Name	Location	Type	Completed	Date designated	Grid ref. Geo-coordinates	Entry number	Image
Cross Lacon in garden to south of Dower House	Arlecdon and Frizington	Cross	Possibly 13th century	9 August 1984	NY0246616680; 54°32′09″N 3°30′32″W	1086720	Upload Photo
Seaton Hall with attached ruins	Bootle	House	16th century	8 September 1967	SD1074789923; 54°17′50″N 3°22′22″W	1086649	Upload Photo
United Reformed Church and 2 attached houses to east	Bootle	House	1780	14 July 1989	SD1077688176; 54°16′53″N 3°22′19″W	1252005	Upload Photo
Eskdale Corn Mill	Boot, Eskdale	Corn mill	1578	21 January 1985	NY1764201146; 54°23′57″N 3°16′12″W	1086655	Eskdale Corn Mill More images
Gatepiers to South of Gosforth Hall	Gosforth	Gate pier	c.1658	9 March 1967	NY0716503621; 54°25′10″N 3°25′56″W	1063743	Gatepiers to South of Gosforth Hall
Gosforth Hall	Gosforth	House	c.1658	9 March 1967	NY0715803652; 54°25′11″N 3°25′56″W	1086661	Gosforth Hall More images
Library and that part of Village Hall which originally constituted Denton Hill	Gosforth	House	1628	9 March 1967	NY0688403523; 54°25′07″N 3°26′11″W	1336018	Upload Photo
Gatehouse range to south of Haile Hall	Haile	House	16th century or 17th century	9 March 1967	NY0355009096; 54°28′05″N 3°29′23″W	1086615	Upload Photo
Haile Hall	Haile	House	1591	9 March 1967	NY0357009146; 54°28′07″N 3°29′22″W	1084317	Haile Hall More images
Church of St Paul	Irton with Santon	Parish church	1857	8 September 1967	NY0916200470; 54°23′30″N 3°24′02″W	1086671	Church of St Paul More images
Medieval tower incorporated into Irton Hall	Irton with Santon	Fortified house	14th century	21 January 1985	NY1048600579; 54°23′34″N 3°22′48″W	1067822	Medieval tower incorporated into Irton Hall More images
Church of St Michael	Lamplugh	Parish church	1870	9 March 1967	NY0885720797; 54°34′27″N 3°24′41″W	1086674	Church of St Michael More images
Duddon Iron Furnace	Millom Without	Metal production furnace	c.1737	8 September 1967	SD1966288303; 54°17′02″N 3°14′08″W	1068577	Duddon Iron Furnace More images
Rosehill, house and adjoining wall	Moresby	House	Late 18th century	9 March 1967	NX9909820298; 54°34′04″N 3°33′44″W	1086712	Upload Photo
Farm building immediately west of Cropple How Farmhouse	Muncaster	Farmhouse	Mid- to late 15th century	27 February 2009	SD1285497743; 54°22′04″N 3°20′34″W	1393157	Upload Photo
Pelham House	Ponsonby	House	c.1780	14 July 1989	NY0378105753; 54°26′17″N 3°29′06″W	1356190	Upload Photo
Manor Stead and house adjoining to north	St Bees	House	Pre-1517	9 March 1967	NX9714311875; 54°29′30″N 3°35′22″W	1086684	Manor Stead and house adjoining to north More images
Pow Bridge over Pow Beck	St Bees	Road bridge	1585	9 August 1984	NX9701312028; 54°29′35″N 3°35′29″W	1137347	Pow Bridge over Pow Beck More images
Church of St Bridget	St Bridget Beckermet	Church	Medieval	9 March 1967	NY0149406066; 54°26′26″N 3°31′13″W	1086588	Church of St Bridget More images
Gatehouse to Calder Abbey	Calder Abbey, St. Bridget Beckermet	Abbey	Probably 14th century	14 July 1989	NY0496006396; 54°26′39″N 3°28′01″W	1086629	Upload Photo
The Monks Oven	Calder Abbey, St. Bridget Beckermet	Abbey	Uncertain	14 July 1989	NY0520506468; 54°26′41″N 3°27′48″W	1068656	The Monks Oven
Church of St John	Ulpha	Parish church	17th century	8 September 1967	SD1980493246; 54°19′42″N 3°14′05″W	1068873	Church of St John More images
Church of St John	Waberthwaite	Parish church	13th century	8 September 1967	SD1002695116; 54°20′37″N 3°23′08″W	1086644	Church of St John More images
Church of St Michael and All Angels	Nether Wasdale, Wasdale	Parish church	15th century	21 January 1985	NY1248404074; 54°25′28″N 3°21′01″W	1343668	Church of St Michael and All Angels More images
Nether End Farmhouse	Weddicar	Farmhouse	1624	9 March 1967	NX9954416071; 54°31′48″N 3°33′14″W	1137431	Upload Photo
Barracks Mill	Whitehaven	Fireproof factory	1809	13 September 1972	NX9736417813; 54°32′42″N 3°35′17″W	1038943	Barracks Mill More images
No 151 Queen Street (including Area Railings)	Whitehaven	House	Georgian	20 July 1949	NX9729417972; 54°32′48″N 3°35′21″W	1086737	No 151 Queen Street (including Area Railings) More images
Somerset House	Whitehaven	House	18th century	20 July 1949	NX9768418125; 54°32′53″N 3°35′00″W	1086776	Somerset House More images
44, 45 Roper Street	Whitehaven	House	Georgian Gothic	13 September 1972	NX9731618002; 54°32′49″N 3°35′20″W	1336017	44, 45 Roper Street More images
14 Scotch Street	Whitehaven	House	Mid-18th century	20 July 1949	NX9747117949; 54°32′47″N 3°35′11″W	1335979	14 Scotch Street More images

== Former City of Carlisle district ==
Name	Location	Type	Completed	Date designated	Grid ref. Geo-coordinates	Entry number	Image
Brackenhill Tower	Arthuret	House	1586	1 April 1957	NY4458169480; 55°01′00″N 2°52′06″W	1087521	Brackenhill Tower More images
Church of St Michael	Arthuret	Church	1609	1 April 1957	NY3793967666; 54°59′59″N 2°58′18″W	1087523	Church of St Michael More images
Churchyard cross west of Church of St Michael	Arthuret	Cross	12th or 13th century	15 June 1984	NY3788967655; 54°59′58″N 2°58′21″W	1087524	Upload Photo
Coop House, north-west of Netherby Hall	Netherby, Arthuret	Estate cottage	Mid-18th century	15 June 1984	NY3866971474; 55°02′02″N 2°57′40″W	1204976	Coop House, north-west of Netherby Hall More images
Netherby Hall	Netherby, Arthuret	House	15th century and later	1 April 1957	NY3966371613; 55°02′07″N 2°56′44″W	1204948	Netherby Hall More images
Church of St Mary	Beaumont	Church	Late 12th century	1 May 1957	NY3481159298; 54°55′27″N 3°01′07″W	1335624	Church of St Mary More images
Church of St Cuthbert	Bewcastle	Church	13th century	1 April 1957	NY5654274561; 55°03′49″N 2°40′55″W	1087539	Church of St Cuthbert More images
Church of St Martin (Brampton Old Church)	Brampton	Church	12th century	1 April 1951	NY5101461557; 54°56′47″N 2°45′59″W	1087645	Church of St Martin (Brampton Old Church) More images
Four Gables	Brampton	House	1879	13 February 1963	NY5434661632; 54°56′50″N 2°42′51″W	1087651	Upload Photo
Moot Hall	Brampton, Brampton	Moot hall	1817	1 April 1957	NY5307461088; 54°56′32″N 2°44′03″W	1137330	Moot Hall More images
Old Church Farmhouse	Brampton	Farmhouse	Early 14th century	16 January 1984	NY5102861598; 54°56′48″N 2°45′58″W	1087646	Upload Photo
Barn adjoining to north of Moorhouse Farmhouse	Moorhouse, Burgh By Sands	Barn	Late 17th century	22 November 1973	NY3298856826; 54°54′06″N 3°02′48″W	1335655	Upload Photo
King Edward I Monument	Sandsfield, Burgh By Sands	Commemorative monument	1685	1 April 1957	NY3257460920; 54°56′18″N 3°03′14″W	1087463	King Edward I Monument More images
Lamonby Farmhouse and adjoining barn	Burgh By Sands	Farmhouse	Mid-17th century	19 September 1984	NY3270859170; 54°55′22″N 3°03′05″W	1039874	Lamonby Farmhouse and adjoining barn More images
Church of St Michael and All Angels	Dalston	Church	12th century	19 September 1984	NY3694450162; 54°50′32″N 2°59′00″W	1374153	Church of St Michael and All Angels More images
Dalston Hall	Dalston	Fortified house	1433–99	19 September 1984	NY3765851566; 54°51′18″N 2°58′21″W	1087441	Dalston Hall More images
Dovecote to north-east of Rose Castle	Dalston	Dovecote	1700	19 September 1984	NY3712546348; 54°48′29″N 2°58′47″W	1087474	Upload Photo
Hawkesdale Hall	Hawkesdale, Dalston	House	Late 17th century	19 September 1984	NY3746447710; 54°49′13″N 2°58′29″W	1335649	Upload Photo
Church of St Mary Magdalen	Hayton	Church	1780	1 April 1957	NY5078657692; 54°54′41″N 2°46′09″W	1335622	Church of St Mary Magdalen More images
Gelt Bridge	Hayton	Railway bridge	1832–35	1 April 1957	NY5324757324; 54°54′30″N 2°43′51″W	1335587	Gelt Bridge More images
Church of St Kentigern	Irthington	Church	12th century	1 April 1957	NY4987661634; 54°56′49″N 2°47′03″W	1335584	Church of St Kentigern More images
Church of St Andrew	Kirkandrews on Esk	Church	1776	1 April 1957	NY3911071982; 55°02′19″N 2°57′16″W	1087506	Church of St Andrew More images
Kirkandrews Tower	Kirkandrews on Esk	House	18th century	1 April 1957	NY3891471928; 55°02′17″N 2°57′27″W	1205396	Kirkandrews Tower More images
Riddings Junction Viaduct	Kirkandrews on Esk	Railway viaduct	1864	31 October 1996	NY4107275585; 55°04′16″N 2°55′28″W	1268307	Riddings Junction Viaduct More images
Church of St Cuthbert	Kirklinton	Church	1845	16 January 1984	NY4326667038; 54°59′41″N 2°53′18″W	1335549	Church of St Cuthbert More images
Tarn House	Midgeholme	Farmhouse	Late 15th century	1 April 1957	NY6061358486; 54°55′10″N 2°36′58″W	1051067	Tarn House More images
Stonegarthside Hall	Nicholforest	House	1682	15 June 1984	NY4803981860; 55°07′42″N 2°48′59″W	1335605	Stonegarthside Hall More images
Church of St Giles	Great Orton, Orton	Church	12th century	19 September 1984	NY3289454287; 54°52′44″N 3°02′51″W	1087417	Church of St Giles More images
Castletown	Rockcliffe	House	1811	1 April 1957	NY3480662098; 54°56′57″N 3°01′10″W	1087596	Castletown
Church of St Mary	Rockcliffe	Church	1848	1 April 1957	NY3588061643; 54°56′43″N 3°00′09″W	1087594	Church of St Mary More images
Church of St Mary	Wreay, St. Cuthbert Without	Church	1840–42	1 April 1957	NY4352548921; 54°49′55″N 2°52′51″W	1087758	Church of St Mary More images
Newbiggin Hall	St. Cuthbert Without	House	Early 19th century	14 September 1954	NY4330350858; 54°50′57″N 2°53′04″W	1087720	Newbiggin Hall More images
Brunstock House	Brunstock, Stanwix Rural	House	1827–33	22 September 1983	NY4188159419; 54°55′34″N 2°54′30″W	1087726	Upload Photo
Drawdykes Castle	Drawdykes, Stanwix Rural	Farmhouse	c.1764	1 April 1957	NY4190758549; 54°55′06″N 2°54′28″W	1087728	Upload Photo
Linstock Castle	Linstock, Stanwix Rural	Farmhouse, former tower house	12th or early 13th century	1 April 1957	NY4289758484; 54°55′04″N 2°53′33″W	1119608	Linstock Castle More images
Temon and adjoining outbuilding	Upper Denton	Farmhouse	Late 17th century	1 April 1957	NY6169963825; 54°58′03″N 2°35′59″W	1087520	Temon and adjoining outbuilding More images
Upper Denton Church	Upper Denton	Church	Early 12th century	1 April 1957	NY6156065514; 54°58′58″N 2°36′08″W	1087564	Upper Denton Church More images
Church of St Mary	Walton	Church	1869–70	16 January 1984	NY5221664490; 54°58′22″N 2°44′53″W	1157868	Church of St Mary More images
Church of St Leonard	Warwick, Wetheral	Church	12th century	1 April 1957	NY4660056800; 54°54′11″N 2°50′03″W	1121876	Church of St Leonard More images
Church of St Mary and St Wilfred	Warwick Bridge, Wetheral	Roman Catholic church	1841	1 April 1957	NY4752156817; 54°54′12″N 2°49′12″W	1111897	Church of St Mary and St Wilfred More images
Church of the Holy Trinity and St Constantine	Wetheral	Church	13th century	1 April 1957	NY4681754401; 54°52′53″N 2°49′50″W	1087692	Church of the Holy Trinity and St Constantine More images
Holme Eden Abbey	Warwick Bridge, Wetheral	Abbey	1833–37	3 September 1973	NY4717957001; 54°54′18″N 2°49′31″W	1087685	Holme Eden Abbey More images
Statue of Polyphemus, Corby Castle	Great Corby, Wetheral	Statue	Early 18th century	22 September 1983	NY4706654039; 54°52′42″N 2°49′35″W	1087675	Upload Photo
The Corn Mill	Warwick Bridge, Wetheral	Watermill	1839	22 September 1983	NY4741656908; 54°54′15″N 2°49′18″W	1087686	The Corn Mill More images
Bishop's Registry	The Abbey	Library	1699	1 June 1949	NY3981255942; 54°53′40″N 2°56′24″W	1197012	Bishop's Registry More images
Church of St Cuthbert with St Mary	Carlisle	Church	1778	1 June 1949	NY3996455843; 54°53′37″N 2°56′15″W	1218565	Church of St Cuthbert with St Mary More images
Citadel Station	Carlisle	Railway station	1847–48	13 November 1972	NY4023655540; 54°53′28″N 2°56′00″W	1196969	Citadel Station More images
Coledale Hall	Carlisle	House	1810	1 June 1949	NY3836755999; 54°53′42″N 2°57′45″W	1196932	Coledale Hall More images
Congregational Church	Carlisle	Church	1842–43	22 March 1974	NY4026755752; 54°53′35″N 2°55′58″W	1196929	Congregational Church More images
Cumberland Infirmary	Carlisle	Hospital	1830–32	13 November 1972	NY3883156084; 54°53′45″N 2°57′19″W	1218237	Cumberland Infirmary More images
Dixons Chimney at Shaddon Mill	Carlisle	Cotton mill	1836	13 November 1972	NY3946255644; 54°53′31″N 2°56′43″W	1196919	Dixons Chimney at Shaddon Mill More images
Monument to Peter Nicholson, north-west of cemetery chapel	Carlisle	Commemorative monument	1855–56	11 April 1994	NY3911354377; 54°52′50″N 2°57′02″W	1218406	Upload Photo
Mulcaster House	Carlisle	House	Late 18th century	1 June 1949	NY4022057035; 54°54′16″N 2°56′02″W	1196986	Upload Photo
No 32 Abbey Street and railings to front	Carlisle	House	c.1817	1 June 1949	NY3974255984; 54°53′42″N 2°56′28″W	1293020	No 32 Abbey Street and railings to front More images
Nos 26, 28 and 30 Castle Street and railings to front	Carlisle	Apartment	1823	1 June 1949	NY3981956047; 54°53′44″N 2°56′24″W	1355058	Nos 26, 28 and 30 Castle Street and railings to front More images
Petteril Bank (now Cumbria Archives)	Carlisle	House	1829	11 April 1994	NY4160153628; 54°52′26″N 2°54′42″W	1297373	Petteril Bank (now Cumbria Archives) More images
Shaddon Mill	Carlisle	Cotton mill	1835–36	1 June 1949	NY3951455628; 54°53′30″N 2°56′40″W	1297383	Shaddon Mill More images
Trustee Savings (now Lloyds) Bank and attached railings	Carlisle	Bank	1874	1 June 1949	NY4026355779; 54°53′35″N 2°55′58″W	1196930	Trustee Savings (now Lloyds) Bank and attached railings More images
18 Fisher Street	Carlisle	House	Late 18th century	1 June 1949	NY3993456094; 54°53′45″N 2°56′17″W	1196951	18 Fisher Street
26 Abbey Street	Carlisle	House	Late 18th century	1 June 1949	NY3972255993; 54°53′42″N 2°56′29″W	1196981	26 Abbey Street More images
2 The Abbey	Carlisle	Clergy house	Late 17th century	1 June 1949	NY3982955956; 54°53′41″N 2°56′23″W	1197013	2 The Abbey More images
21 Castle Street	Carlisle	House	Late 18th century	1 June 1949	NY3988356044; 54°53′44″N 2°56′20″W	1297358	21 Castle Street More images
24 Abbey Street	Carlisle	House	Early 19th century	1 June 1949	NY3971656002; 54°53′42″N 2°56′29″W	1297355	24 Abbey Street More images
19, 21 and 23 Victoria Place	Carlisle	House	Early 1870s	13 November 1972	NY4035356001; 54°53′43″N 2°55′54″W	1197137	Upload Photo
2 Albert Street	Carlisle	Terrace	1852–54	1 June 1949	NY4031856035; 54°53′44″N 2°55′56″W	1297274	Upload Photo
3 and 6 The Abbey	Carlisle	Clergy house	Late 17th century	1 June 1949	NY3994355915; 54°53′40″N 2°56′16″W	1293105	3 and 6 The Abbey More images
3–17 Victoria Place	Carlisle	Terrace	Late 1840s	1 June 1949	NY4028255981; 54°53′42″N 2°55′57″W	1197136	Upload Photo
2 Victoria Place	Carlisle	House	1830s	13 November 1972	NY4025256022; 54°53′43″N 2°55′59″W	1218796	Upload Photo
1 Victoria Place	Carlisle	House	1830s	13 November 1972	NY4026855981; 54°53′42″N 2°55′58″W	1196918	Upload Photo
Cumberland and Westmorland Joint Counties’ War Memorial	Rickerby Park, Carlisle	War memorial	1922	11 April 1994	NY4090956844; 54°54′10″N 2°55′23″W	1291971	Cumberland and Westmorland Joint Counties’ War Memorial More images
