= Robert McQuillin =

Robert McQuillin FGS FRSE is a scientist and author.

As an author, he has been collected by libraries. He is from Brampton, Cumberland.

== Societies ==
- 1986 Elected Fellow or the Royal Society of Edinburgh
- Fellow of the Geological Society of London (past Vice-President); awarded the Lyell Fund in 1970
- Fellow of the Geological Society of Edinburgh (past Vice-President)

== Published scientific articles ==
- An Introduction To Seismic Interpretation
- Explaining the North Sea's lunar floor
- Footwall uplift in the Inner Moray Firth basin, offshore Scotland
