= Brampton Old Church =

- Church of St Martin, Brampton
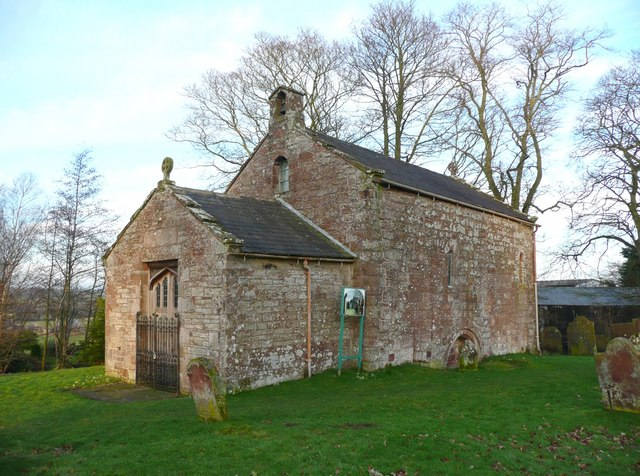
- Brampton Old Church from the southwest

- Location in the former Carlisle district, Cumbria Location in Cumbria, England
- 54.9463°N 2.7663°W
- OS grid reference: NY 510 615
- Location: Near Brampton, Cumbria
- Country: England
- Denomination: Anglican

Architecture
- Functional status: Redundant
- Heritage designation: Grade II*
- Designated: 1 April 1951
- Architectural type: Church
- Style: Norman

Specifications
- Materials: Sandstone rubble Slate roofs

Brampton Old Church stands about 1 mile (2 km) to the west of the town of Brampton, Cumbria, England. It was originally the parish church of Brampton but is now redundant. The church is recorded in the National Heritage List for England as a designated Grade II* listed building.

== History ==
The church was built on the site of a Roman fort situated on the Stanegate Roman road some 1.5 miles (2 km) south of Hadrian's Wall. The church building dates from the 12th century, with later alterations and additions. It formerly consisted of a tower, nave and chancel. The tower and nave were demolished between 1787 and 1789, although a porch was added in 1861. It was possibly re-roofed in 1891. It was replaced as the parish church in 1878 by St Martin's Church in the town of Brampton. The church was declared redundant in 1978 and the internal furnishings were removed.

== Architecture ==
The church is constructed of red sandstone rubble, some of the stone having been obtained from Hadrian's Wall, with slate roofs. It consists of the former chancel and the porch. On the north side is the former sexton's lean-to shed. The porch has iron gates and oak doors, and on its gable is a cross finial. The chancel has a Norman window; the other windows date from 1891. In the chancel is a piscina and aumbry dating possibly from the 12th century. On its east gable is a cross finial and on the west gable is a bellcote.

== See also ==
- Grade II* listed buildings in Cumberland
- Listed buildings in Brampton, Carlisle
