= List of listed buildings in Canonbie, Dumfries and Galloway =

This is a list of listed buildings in the parish of Canonbie in Dumfries and Galloway, Scotland.

== List ==
Name	Location	Date listed	Geo-coordinates	Notes	Category	LB number	Image
Canonbie Village, Canonbie War Memorial			55°04′40″N 2°57′13″W		C(S)	3502	Upload another image
Tarrasfoot Tile Works			55°07′09″N 2°58′22″W		A	3535	Upload Photo
Barnglieshead Farm Steading			55°05′51″N 3°03′40″W		C(S)	3536	Upload Photo
Claygate Village, Claygate House and Gatepiers			55°06′11″N 2°57′00″W		C(S)	3503	Upload Photo
Byreburnfoot Bridge and Embankment (A7 over Byre Burn)			55°05′33″N 2°57′25″W		A	3520	Upload Photo
Canonbie Village, Schoolhouse			55°04′51″N 2°56′50″W		C(S)	3501	Upload Photo
Byreburn Bridge, (B6318 over Byre Burn)			55°06′15″N 2°56′44″W		C(S)	3519	Upload Photo
Penton Bridge (B6318 over the Liddel Water)			55°05′17″N 2°53′25″W		B	3530	Upload another image
Sark Bridge, (B6357 over River Sark)			55°04′02″N 3°02′47″W		B	3534	Upload another image
Canonbie Village School, Playground Walls and Railings			55°04′49″N 2°56′49″W		C(S)	3500	Upload Photo
Canonbie Free Church			55°05′04″N 2°57′36″W		B	3521	Upload another image
Harelaw Limekilns			55°06′02″N 2°53′59″W		B	3524	Upload Photo
Hollows or Gilnockie Tower			55°05′51″N 2°58′10″W		A	3527	Upload another image
Riddings Junction Viaduct over Liddel Water			55°04′18″N 2°55′27″W		A	3533	Upload another image
Canonbie Village, Canonbie Parish Churchyard and Donaldson Monument (Priory Sedilia)			55°04′40″N 2°56′57″W		B	3498	Upload another image
Morton Churchyard (Sark Tower Churchyard)			55°03′55″N 3°02′49″W		B	3528	Upload another image
Canonbie Village, Canonbie Bridge (A7 over River Esk)			55°04′47″N 2°56′55″W		B	3522	Upload another image
Canonbie Village, Canonbie Parish Church			55°04′40″N 2°56′57″W		B	3523	Upload another image
Old Tollbooth			55°03′14″N 2°57′43″W		B	3529	Upload Photo
Priorslynn, Cruck-framed Building			55°04′24″N 2°57′04″W		A	3531	Upload Photo
Brockwoodlees Farmhouse and Steading			55°05′35″N 2°58′10″W		B	3537	Upload Photo
Canonbie Free Church Manse			55°05′03″N 2°57′37″W		B	3538	Upload Photo
Uppermillsteads Farm Steading with Farmhouse and Well			55°07′18″N 2°54′24″W		C(S)	49580	Upload Photo
Glencartholm Farmhouse			55°06′13″N 2°58′31″W		B	3505	Upload Photo
Woodslee House			55°03′33″N 2°57′18″W		B	3518	Upload Photo
Priorslynn Farmhouse and Steading			55°04′27″N 2°57′00″W		B	3532	Upload Photo
Canonbie Village, Riverside Inn			55°04′48″N 2°57′01″W		B	3499	Upload Photo
Gilnockie Bridge (A7 over River Esk)			55°05′39″N 2°57′50″W		A	3504	Upload another image
Hollows Mill			55°05′42″N 2°57′53″W		B	3525	Upload Photo
Hollows Mill, Farm Steading			55°05′43″N 2°57′55″W		B	3526	Upload Photo

== Key ==
The scheme for classifying buildings in Scotland is:

- Category A: "buildings of national or international importance, either architectural or historic; or fine, little-altered examples of some particular period, style or building type."
- Category B: "buildings of regional or more than local importance; or major examples of some particular period, style or building type, which may have been altered."
- Category C: "buildings of local importance; lesser examples of any period, style, or building type, as originally constructed or moderately altered; and simple traditional buildings which group well with other listed buildings."

In March 2016 there were 47,288 listed buildings in Scotland. Of these, 8% were Category A, and 50% were Category B, with the remaining 42% being Category C.
