= St Mary's Church, Walton =

Coordinates: 54.9727°N 2.7480°W

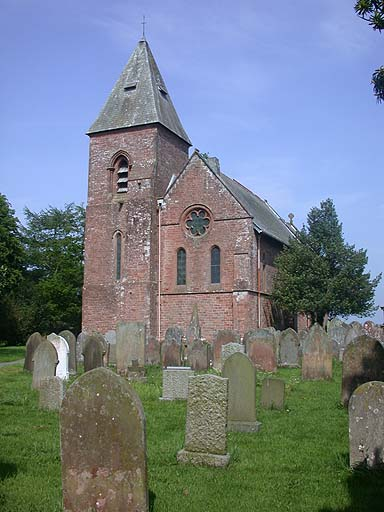
- St Mary's Church, Walton, from the west

- Location Cumbria
- OS grid reference: NY 522,645
- Location: Walton, Cumbria
- Country: England
- Denomination: Anglican
- Website: St Mary, Walton

History
- Status: Parish church

Architecture
- Functional status: Active
- Heritage designation: Grade II*
- Designated: 16 January 1984
- Architect: Paley and Austin
- Architectural type: Church
- Style: Gothic Revival
- Completed: 1870

Specifications
- Materials: Sandstone, slate roofs

Administration
- Province: York
- Diocese: Carlisle
- Archdeaconry: Carlisle
- Deanery: Brampton
- Parish: Lanercost with Kirkambeck and Walton

Clergy
- Vicar: Revd Roderick David Allon-Smith

St Mary's Church is in the village of Walton, Cumbria, England. It is an active Anglican parish church in the deanery of Brampton, the archdeaconry of Carlisle, and the diocese of Carlisle. Its benefice is united with those of four nearby parishes. The church is recorded in the National Heritage List for England as a designated Grade II* listed building.

== History ==
The present church was built in 1869–70 on the site of a previous medieval church, which had itself been rebuilt in 1811 and extended in 1843. The architects were the Lancaster partnership of Paley and Austin. The church cost about £2,000 (equivalent to £210,000 as of 2025).

== Architecture ==
=== Exterior ===
St Mary's is constructed in red sandstone on an ashlar chamfered plinth. It has quoins, a string course, and slate roofs with coped gables, a cross finial, and decorative ridge tiles. The plan consists of a four-bay nave, a north aisle, a three-bay chancel, and a tower incorporating a porch at the northwest. On the west wall of the tower is a stair turret. The entrance to the porch is through a pointed doorway on the north side. The bell openings are also pointed, they contain louvres, and are Early English in style. On top of the tower is a pyramidal roof with small louvres. The sides of the church differ. The south side contains tall lancet windows and one quatrefoil. The north side has a catslide roof extending from the ridge to the edge of the aisle. It contains smaller lancet windows. At the west end are a pair of lancet windows and a rose window. At the east end are three equal-sized lancet windows with a quatrefoil above.

=== Interior ===
The pews and all the furnishings date from the 19th or early 20th century. At the base of the font is a fragment of a cross from the 10th or 11th century. On the walls are marble memorial plaques moved from the earlier church. The reredos dates from 1899 and consists of a mosaic framed in alabaster. The stained glass in the east window is by William Wailes and is dated 1869. In the north aisle is a window by Heaton, Butler and Bayne from about 1912. The age of the single-manual organ is not known, but it thought to have been built by Samuel Renn of Manchester.

== External features ==
In the churchyard is a hearse house dating from the early 19th century. It is constructed in calciferous sandstone and has a slate roof. It has been listed at Grade II. It is probable that its round-arched window comes from the 1813 church.

== See also ==
- Grade II* listed buildings in Cumberland
- Listed buildings in Walton, Cumbria
- List of ecclesiastical works by Paley and Austin
