= Listed buildings in Walton, Cumbria =

Walton is a civil parish in the Cumberland district, Cumbria, England. It contains nine listed buildings that are recorded in the National Heritage List for England. Of these, one is listed at Grade II*, the middle of the three grades, and the others are at Grade II, the lowest grade. The parish contains the village of Walton, and is otherwise rural. The listed buildings comprise houses and associated structures, and a church with a hearse house in the churchyard.

== Key ==
Grade	Criteria
II*	Particularly important buildings of more than special interest
II	Buildings of national importance and special interest

== Buildings ==
Name and location	Photograph	Date	Notes	Grade
White Hill; 54.98573°N 2.72506°W	—	1611	The house was extended in the 19th century. The original wall at the rear is in sandstone, and the side and front walls are in brick; the roof is in Welsh slate. There are two storeys and two bays, with a single-storey two-bay extension to the right. The doorway has a stone surround and a lintel containing the date flanked by coats of arms. The windows are sashes with flat brick arches and stone sills, and there is a fire window.	II
Orchard House; 54.97269°N 2.75049°W	—	Late 17th century (probable)	This originated as a single-storey cottage, and in the 19th century a storey was added and it became a public house; it has since been a private house. The house is rendered, and has stone dressings and a Welsh slate roof. There are two storeys and four bays. The doorway has a 20th-century wooden surround, the original doorway having been converted into a window. The windows are sashes with stone surrounds.	II
Sandysike; 54.96866°N 2.75771°W	—	1760	The house was extended in about 1820. It is stuccoed on a chamfered plinth, and has quoins, a plain cornice, and a slate roof with coped gables. There are two storeys and three bays, with a two-storey, two-bay extension to the left, and a single-bay single-storey bay with a hipped roof to the right. The doorway has a moulded architrave, an ornamental frieze, and a dentilled moulded triangular pediment on consoles. The windows are sashes with plain surrounds.	II
Walls and gardener's house, Castlesteads; 54.96346°N 2.76295°W	—	Late 18th century	The walls enclose a garden, and are built directly on top of and on the same alignment as a Roman fort. Incorporated in the southeast wall is a sandstone house that has two storeys and one bays and a pyramidal roof.	II
Walton High Rigg; 54.98317°N 2.74073°W		Late 18th century	A sandstone farmhouse with quoins, a dentilled cornice, and a green slate roof with coped gables. There are two storeys and four bays. The doorway has an alternate block surround, and the sash windows have plain surrounds.	II
Castlesteads; 54.96185°N 2.76457°W	—	Between 1789 and 1794	A country house in sandstone on a chamfered plinth, with pilaster angle strips, a string course, a modillioned and dentilled cornice, a parapet, and a slate roof. The house has two storeys, a central bock of seven bays that is flanked by L-shaped wings, with two bays to the front and five bays on the sides. The doorway has engaged Doric columns, a plain entablature and a dentilled triangular pediment. The windows are sashes. In the main block they have plain surrounds. In the ground floor of the wings, they are round-headed with decorated friezes, and in the upper floor they have surrounds of pilaster strips and rusticated blocks, moulded triangular pediments, and sills on consoles. At the rear (now the entrance front), are apsidal staircase projections.	II
Hearse house 54.97285°N 2.74779°W	—	Early 19th century	The hearse house is in the churchyard of St Mary's Church. It is in calciferous sandstone, with quoins and a slate roof. The building has one storey and one bay. Above the door is a large stone lintel, and there is a round-headed window on the left side with impost blocks and a keystone.	II
Vicarage; 54.97317°N 2.74730°W	—	1838	The vicarage is in brick and has a slate roof with coped gables. There are two storeys and three bays. The doorway has a moulded stone architrave, and the sash windows have flat brick arches and stone sills.	II
St Mary's Church; 54.97271°N 2.74795°W		1869–70	The church, designed by Paley and Austin, stands on the site of an earlier medieval church. It is in sandstone on a chamfered plinth, with quoins, string courses, and a slate roof with coped gables and a cross finial. The church consists of a nave, a north aisle, a chancel, and a northwest tower incorporating a porch. The tower has three stages, a north entrance with a pointed arch, a west stair tower, and a pyramidal roof. The windows are lancets.	II*
