= Dixon's Chimney and Shaddon Mill =

Former cotton mill in Carlisle, England

Coordinates: 54°53′31″N 2°56′43″W

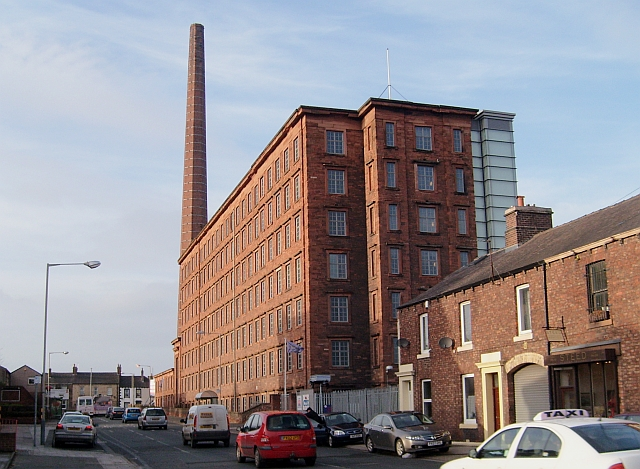
Shaddon Mill and Dixon's Chimney, Carlisle

Shaddon Mill is a former cotton mill in Carlisle, Cumbria, England. Both the mill and its 290 feet (88 m) tall chimney, named Dixon's Chimney after its builder, Peter Dixon, are Grade II* listed buildings. In 2019, a man died after slipping from the chimney and hanging suspended from it for several hours.

== History ==
The mill and chimney were constructed in 1836 by Peter Dixon and designed by the Manchester architect Richard Tattersall. The chimney was built to be tall enough to prevent the large amounts of smoke generated by the factory becoming noxious to the rest of the city. In its day, Shaddon Mill was the largest cotton mill in England and had the 8th largest chimney in the world. Shaddon Mill became an Historic Listed Building in 1949 and the chimney became an Historic Listed Structure in 1972. Peter Dixon and Sons Ltd. provided work for 8000 people in their four mills in the area.

In 1883 Peter Dixon and Sons Ltd. went into liquidation and the mill was taken over by Robert Todd and Sons Ltd., who then used the mill for wool production rather than cotton. The chimney was restored by Carlisle City Council in 1999. Originally it was 305 feet (93 m) tall, but in 1950 it was shortened to 290 feet (88 m). The internal diameter of the chimney remains 17 feet 6 inches (5.33 m) and 10 feet (3.0 m) walls at the base. In 2005 part of the mill was converted into apartments by Story Homes and the other part is used by the University of Cumbria.

=== 2019 death ===
During the early hours of 27 October 2019, a 53-year-old man, Phil Longcake, climbed the hundreds of steps to the top of the chimney. He slipped and his foot became trapped between the chimney and its ladder. He spent more than 14 hours dangling upside down, shirtless and suspended by one foot.

Emergency services were alerted at 2:22 am. Two initial rescue plans, the first involving a coastguard helicopter and the second to send rescuers up the ladder, were dismissed as either could have led to Longcake being dislodged and falling. A specialist cherry picker platform was brought in from Glasgow, but Longcake had died by the time rescuers reached him. He was confirmed deceased at the scene at 4:46 pm. An inquest recorded his cause of death as hypothermia and cerebral swelling.

Longcake's family said he had struggled with mental health problems. He had recently told them he had been sexually abused as a child, and told health workers he planned to kill himself. His son said he believed Longcake planned to jump from the tower to send a message to his alleged abuser.

== See also ==
- Grade II* listed buildings in Cumberland
- Listed buildings in Carlisle, Cumbria
