= Walton, Cumbria =

Village and civil parish in Cumbria, England

Coordinates: 54.9719°N 2.7498°W

Walton
- Village and parish
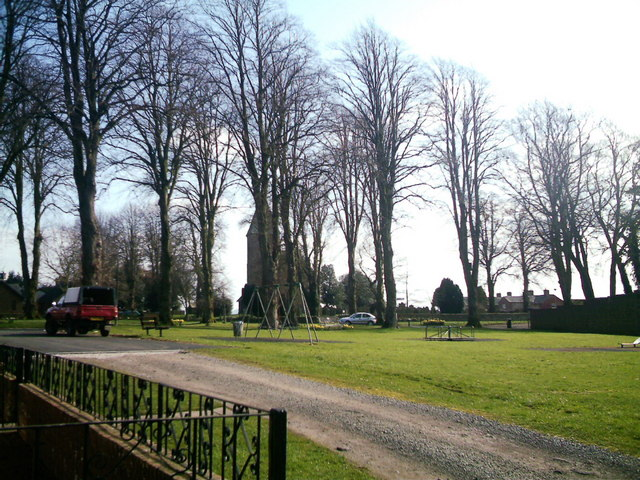
- Walton Village Green

- Location within Cumbria
- Population: 282 (2021 census)
- OS grid reference: NY5200764408
- Civil parish: Walton
- Unitary authority: Cumberland
- Ceremonial county: Cumbria
- Region: North West
- Country: England
- Sovereign state: United Kingdom
- Post town: BRAMPTON
- Postcode district: CA8
- Dialling code: 016977
- Police: Cumbria
- Fire: Cumbria
- Ambulance: North West
- UK Parliament: Carlisle

Walton is a village and civil parish in the far north of Cumbria, England. It is located 10 miles (16 km) from Carlisle and is about 2 miles (3 km) north of Brampton, on the north bank of the River Irthing. Nearby villages include Newtown, Banks and Lanercost. In 2021 the parish had a population of 282.

== Description ==
Walton remains an unspoiled part of England and has a historic background as the course of Hadrian's Wall skirts the village to its south. In the past, Walton comprised two separate townships; Low Walton and High Walton. However Low Walton and High Walton have now combined to create a single area.

William Ford mentions Walton in his writing when travelling around the Lake District. He writes "the village of Walton, on the line of the wall, as its name denominates..." It is now believed that the name Walton comes from the settlement/farmstead of Wealas – native Celts described by the Anglo-Saxon speaking peoples. There is strong evidence that in many areas of England taken over by Germanic speaking settlers, the native British (Wealas) remained undisturbed, farming the same land they did when the Romans left.

== Historical Maps ==
Many historical maps exist, which have been produced by various different Cartographers which show Walton. The majority of these maps refer to Walton as "Waleton." These historical maps include;

- Morden's Map – produced by Robert Morden in 1695.
- Jansson's Map – made in 1646 by Jan Jansson, who was from the Netherlands.
- Saxton's map – dates back to 1576 and was produced by Christopher Saxton and was engraved by Augustine Ryther.

Saxton Map of 1576

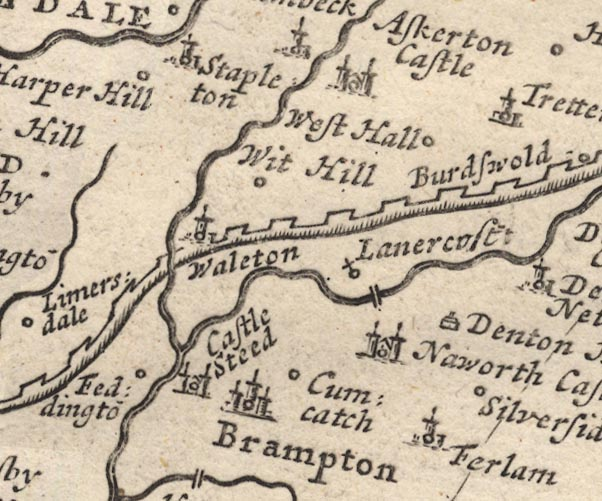
Morden Map of 1695, with a sketch of Hadrian's Wall from west to east

== The Community ==
Walton's Total Population Change

Walton Resident's Occupation 1881

According to the Census, in 2001 278 people lived in Walton. 140 of these were male and 138 female. The average age of the village's residents in 2001 was 43.61, with the majority of residents aged between 45 and 64 years old. As the village is surrounded by countryside, the main occupation for the majority of the community has always been focused on agriculture. For example, in 1881, agriculture was by far the largest industry, with 483 men worked in the agriculture sector.

== The Village ==
Walton has a church and a village hall. The village hall was used as a school, in the National Gazetteer in 1868 it says that the village hall was also used for a Sunday school. However, in the present day, the village hall is no longer used as a school and its main purpose is to provide the village with a post office. The closest school to Walton is William Howard School in Brampton, 2 miles away from the parish. The village has no shops, the nearest shop for residents in Walton to use is in Brampton, which is 2 1/2 miles from the village. The residents of Walton depend greatly on Brampton for their health. The nearest doctor's surgery and dentist are both in Brampton. There used to be a pub named The Centurion in Walton, however it is now closed.

The area of Walton rapidly increased between 1851 and 1911. In 1851, the area was 9,642 acres, whereas in 1911, the area had expanded to 48,576 acres.

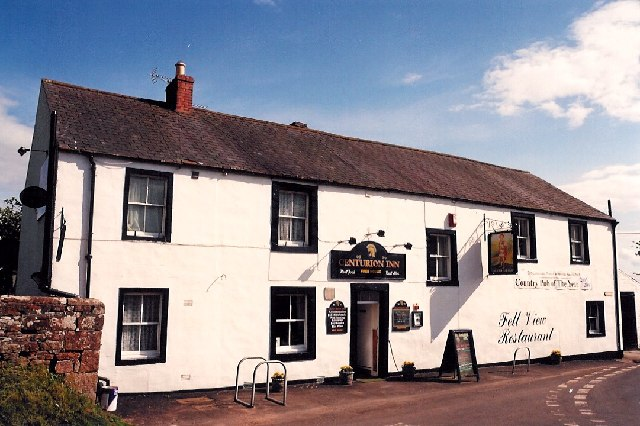
The Centurion at Walton

== St Mary's Church ==
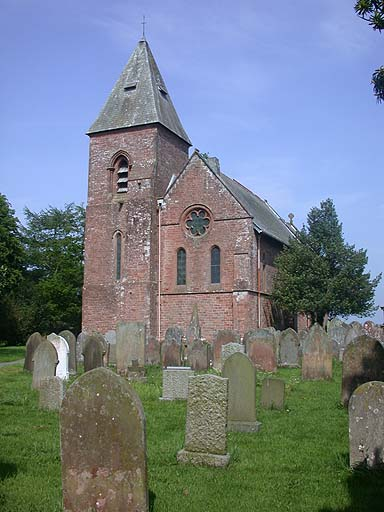
St Mary's Church

The church in Walton is St Mary's Church. It is an active Anglican Parish Church. The church was built in 1869 on the site of a medieval church, it is believed to have cost at least £2000. The church was designed in a Gothic style by the architects Paley and Austin who were based in Lancaster, Lancashire. The church consists of a chancel, nave, north aisle, a tower and a porch. Within the church there are brass plaques set into the floor, commemorating the Johnson family, who occupied the Castlesteads mansion on the site of the Hadrian's Wall fort of Camboglanna. The brass plaques date from 1821 to 1865.

== Castlesteads Mansion ==
Castlesteads Mansion is one of the most important buildings in Walton. It is listed as a grade II building. It was built at the end of the 18th century by the Johnson family. It is believed that the estate was previously owned by the Dacre family who built "Walton House" using stones from the nearby Hadrian's Wall. The Johnson family purchased the estate in 1789 and replaced "Walton House" with a larger mansion, known as Castlesteads. It is located on the site of the Roman fort of Camboglanna. The mansion is south east of Walton and is surrounded by 75 acres (30 ha) of woods, it also looks over the River Irthing. In 1839, William Ford described Castlesteads in his journal as being "an elegant and modern residence." At the time of this description Castlesteads was known as "Walton House" and was occupied by William Johnson. Ford also states that many "Roman remains" were dug up and are preserved at Castelesteads.

== Hadrian's Wall ==
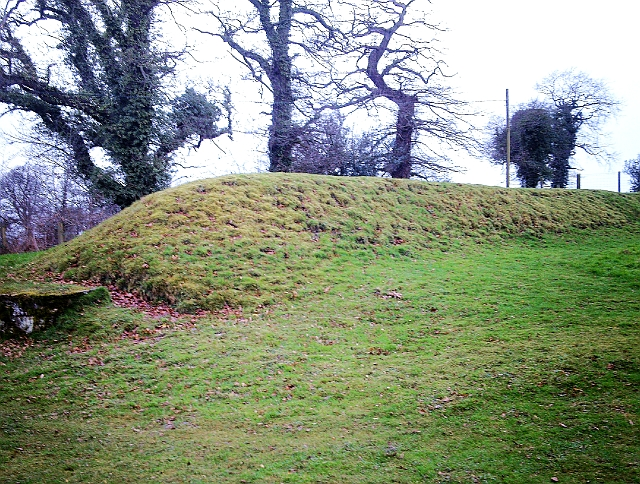
Hadrian's Wall to the east of the village, currently buried to preserve the fragile stonework

One of the main features which draws people to the village is its historical past. The parish stands on the route of Hadrian's Wall. The remains of the Roman wall can still be seen near Walton today, and it is thought that the village is situated at the site of one of the milecastles of Hadrian's Wall, Milecastle 56. It is said that many of the old cottages and buildings are made from the stones taken from the Roman wall. A National Trail named Hadrian's Wall Path was opened in May 2003 in Walton. However, the section of Hadrian's wall closest to Walton has been covered to protect it. The public can view an exposed section of the wall near the hamlet of Banks, about 5 miles east of Walton.

In the 19th century, James Steele of Walton wrote a poem regarding Walton and the presence of Hadrian's Wall. James Steele was a blind poet, as well as a social reformer, teacher and a musician. An abstract of his poem includes; "Walton on the Roman Wall, fairest village of them all, rivers three around thee flow, clearest streams a man may know."

== Transport ==
The closest airport to Walton is Carlisle Airport, which is situated 3.4 miles away from the village. To travel to or from Walton via train, Carlisle Railway Station is the closest train station, which is 9.2 miles away from the parish. The nearest main bus station is situated 9.1 miles away in Carlisle also.

== See also ==
- Listed buildings in Walton, Cumbria
