= Riddings Junction Viaduct =

Disused viaduct on English Scottish border

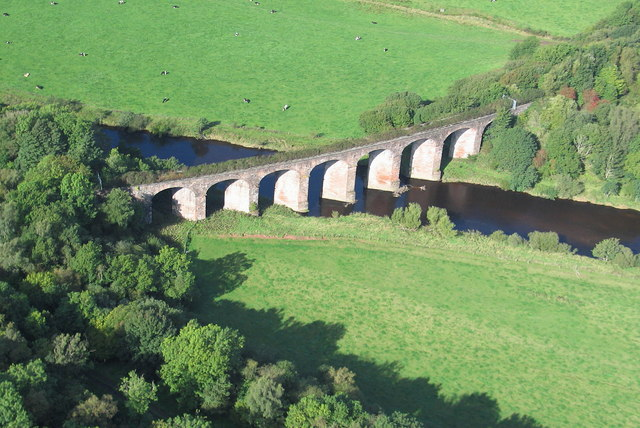
- Bridge across the River Liddel
- Coordinates: 55.0714°N 2.9242°W
- Crosses: Liddel Water
- Locale: Cumbria, Dumfries and Galloway

Characteristics
- Design: Arch
- Material: Red sandstone
- Height: 23 metres (75 ft)
- No. of spans: 9

History
- Opened: 1864
- Closed: 1967

Listed Building – Category A
- Official name: Riddings Junction Viaduct, Over Liddel Water
- Designated: 2 August 1971
- Reference no.: LB3533

Listed Building – Grade II*
- Official name: Riddings Junction Viaduct
- Designated: 31 October 1996
- Reference no.: 1268307

Location
- Interactive map of Riddings Junction Viaduct

Riddings Junction Viaduct (or Riddings Viaduct) is a disused cross-border railway bridge over Liddel Water between Kirkandrews, in Cumbria, north-western England, and Canonbie in Dumfries and Galloway, south-western Scotland. It is a listed building in both countries; the Scottish section is category A listed, and the English section is Grade II*.

== Description ==
The viaduct consists of nine semi-elliptical, depressed arches on an unusually sharp skew, crossing the river in a sweeping curve. It is built from local red sandstone and faced in bullnosed (rounded) ashlar. The arches have channelled voussoirs, a pattern which continues along the soffits, and spring from prominent impost bands. They are supported on tapering rectangular piers at the base of which are narrow cutwaters. The stonework has decorative channelling which continues diagonally through the soffits. A brick parapet and iron handrail were added in the late 20th century. The viaduct is 60 feet (18 metres) high and 160 yards (150 metres) long, each arch having a span of 44 feet (13 metres).

== History ==
The viaduct was built for the North British Railway at the very beginning of its branch from Riddings Junction on the outskirts of Carlisle to Langholm in Scotland, part of the Waverley Route. The viaduct runs from the south bank of Liddel Water in Kirkandrews-on-Esk in Cumbria to the north bank near Rowanburn, in the parish of Canonbie, Dumfries and Galloway. It opened on 18 March 1864 and closed, with the rest of the line, on 18 September 1967 as part of the Beeching cuts; the viaduct has been disused ever since. It carried a single track for its entire operational life; the rails were removed when the line closed.

The viaduct is now part of the Historical Railways Estate and maintained by National Highways. Restoration works were undertaken in 2024 and completed in 2025, the bridge having fallen into disrepair since closure. Work included repairs to the railings and stonework, using materials matched to the originals to preserve the bridge's appearance and ensure its stability, though it remained disused.

== See also ==
- List of Category A listed buildings in Dumfries and Galloway
- Grade II* listed buildings in Cumberland
- List of listed buildings in Canonbie
- Listed buildings in Kirkandrews-on-Esk
- List of bridges in Scotland
