= St Michael's Church, Workington =

Church in Workington, Cumbria, England

Coordinates: 54.6457°N 3.5553°W

Workington Parish Church
- The Parish Church of St Michael, Workington
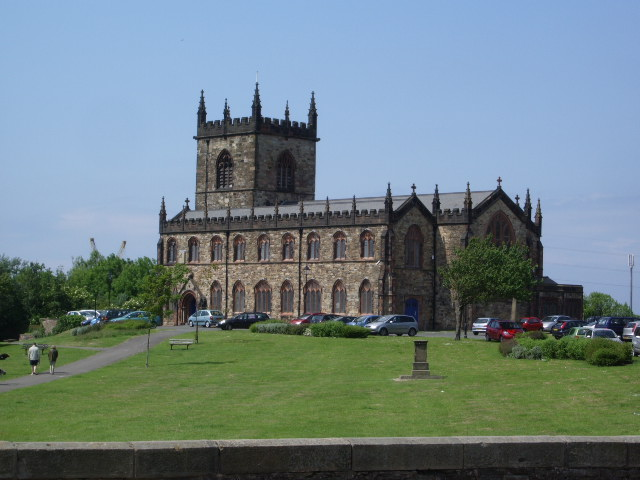
- View of St Michael's Church from the southeast

- Location in Allerdale, Cumbria Location in Cumbria, England
- OS grid reference: NX 99734 28956
- Location: Workington, Cumbria
- Country: England
- Denomination: Anglican
- Churchmanship: Liberal Catholic
- Website: https://workingtonbenefice.org.uk

History
- Status: Parish Church
- Dedication: St Michael

Architecture
- Functional status: Active
- Heritage designation: Grade II*
- Designated: 6 June 1951
- Architectural type: Church

Administration
- Province: York
- Diocese: Carlisle
- Archdeaconry: West Cumberland
- Deanery: Solway
- Parish: Workington

Clergy
- Rector: The Reverend Ben Thompson SMMS

St Michael's Church, Workington is the parish church of the town of Workington, Cumbria, England. It is part of the deanery of Solway, in the archdeaconry of West Cumberland.

== History ==
The oldest part of the church dates from around 1150, as evidenced by a marble plaque located at the rear of the church bearing that date and naming Walter as the first rector. However, there is evidence that an earlier seventh-century monastery was located on the same site. Nearby Viking Age finds confirm settlement well before the 12th century in the area surrounding the mouth of the river Derwent. 11th-century texts describe the arrival of monks from Lindisfarne, carrying the bones of St Cuthbert, in Workington (then called Derwentmouth) following the destruction of the kingdom of Northumbria by the Vikings in 875. It is presumed the monks stayed at the monastery on the site currently occupied by St Michael's Church before leaving Derwentmouth by boat.

The 12th-century church was typical of many border churches, being constructed for both worship and protection. It originally consisted of a simple nave and chancel, with a fortified tower only accessible through the nave. The original tower constitutes the base of the current one. The church served a local population composed mostly of fishermen and farmers, as well as the Curwen family, the local lords of the manor. Effigies of Sir Christopher Curwen and his wife, dated 1450, are located within the church.

Much of the church was rebuilt in 1770, but in 1887 a large part was destroyed by fire. The church was rebuilt over the course of three years, and was heavily redecorated in 1938. Fire once more destroyed much of the church in 1994, this time closing it for seven years, before it was reopened and rededicated in 2001.

== See also ==
- Grade II* listed buildings in Cumberland
- Listed buildings in Workington
