= Milecastle 56 =

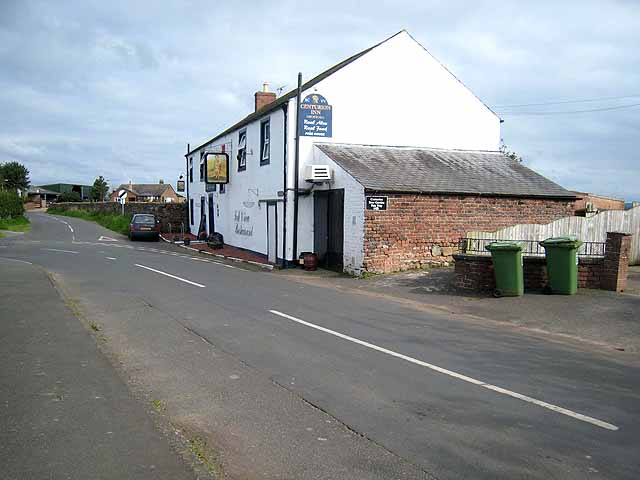
- Milecastle 56 is thought to lie northeast of the former village inn at Walton

- Location within Cumbria
- 54.971466°N 2.747448°W
- Type: Milecastle
- Location: Cumbria, England

Milecastle 56 (Walton) was a milecastle on Hadrian's Wall (grid reference NY522643).

== Description ==
Milecastle 56 is thought to lie northeast of the former inn (the Centurion Inn) at Walton, Cumbria. The general course of Hadrian's Wall passes under the village of Walton, and Milecastle 56 is wholly obliterated. Slight marks of the milecastle were said to be detectable in 1858, but a survey conducted in 1900 found no trace.

== Associated turrets ==
Each milecastle on Hadrian's Wall had two associated turret structures. These turrets were positioned approximately one-third and two-thirds of a Roman mile to the west of the Milecastle, and would probably have been manned by part of the milecastle's garrison. The turrets associated with Milecastle 56 are known as Turret 56A and Turret 56B.

=== Turret 56A ===
Turret 56A (Sandyside) (grid reference NY51766414) is thought to lie just to the east of Sandysike farm. It has never been located on the ground and its approximate position has been calculated from neighbouring structures on Hadrian's Wall. There was a failed attempt to find it in 1933.

In the woodland on the east and west sides of Sandysike, Hadrian's Wall is visible as an earth covered bank, 5.6 metres wide and up to 0.5 metres high. Nearby is a Roman altar built into an outbuilding of Sandysike farm, 0.7 metres above ground level.

=== Turret 56B ===
Turret 56B (Cambeck) (grid reference NY51236394) is situated about 140 metres east of the Cam Beck on a river terrace. It was located in 1933 and measured 6.2 metres across. It projected 0.8 metres in front of the line of Hadrian's Wall, and is assumed to have originally belonged to the Turf Wall. There are no traces of the turret visible above ground.

The site of the Roman fort at Castlesteads (Camboglanna) is situated 440 metres south of Turret 56B.
