= Listed buildings in Kirkandrews-on-Esk =

Kirkandrews-on-Esk is a civil parish in the Cumberland district of Cumbria, England. It contains 13 listed buildings that are recorded in the National Heritage List for England. Of these, three are listed at Grade II*, the middle of the three grades, and the others are at Grade II, the lowest grade. The parish is almost completely rural. The listed buildings consist of two farmhouses, a former tower house with associated structures, a former toll house, a church, a railway viaduct, and six milestones.

== Key ==
Grade	Criteria
II*	Particularly important buildings of more than special interest
II	Buildings of national importance and special interest

== Buildings ==
Name and location	Photograph	Date	Notes	Grade
Kirkandrews Tower; 55.03813°N 2.95734°W		16th century	Originally a tower house, it is a peel tower built in the sixteenth century and was altered in the 18th and 20th centuries. The house is built with thick sandstone walls on a chamfered plinth, and has quoins, a corbelled parapet-walk, and a steeply pitched gabled slate roof. There are three storeys and two bays. The main entrance is on the first floor, it has a roll moulded architrave, and is approached by external stone steps. The ground floor formed a vaulted undercroft, and has a doorway with a similar surround. Some window openings are blocked, others contain casements. It is on the west bank of the River Esk.	II*
St Andrew's Church; 55.03863°N 2.95428°W		1776	The interior of the church was restored in 1892–93 by Temple Moore. The church is built in sandstone on a plinth, and has string courses, dentilled triangular gable pediments, and a slate roof with coped gables. It consists of a nave and a chancel, and has a bell-tower rising from the west end. The tower is square, with a sundial, and is surmounted by an open rotunda of columns on which is a dome and a weathervane. The entrance is flanked by engaged Tuscan columns, and above it is a triangular moulded pediment. At its sides are round-headed windows, with square windows above, and there are round-headed windows along the sides of the church. Inside the church is a rood screen with fluted Corinthian columns.	II*
Low Moat; 55.05084°N 2.94500°W	—	Early 19th century	A sandstone farmhouse with quoins and a hipped green slate roof. There are two storeys and three bays, an H-shaped plan, and a single-storey extension to the right. The central bay is recessed with Tuscan columns. The outer bays contain entrances, the left is blocked, the right has a doorway with flanking blocked side lights, all with moulded cornices. The windows are sashes with plain surrounds.	II
Milestone; 55.00239°N 3.01298°W	—	Early 19th century	The milestone was provided for the Longtown to Gretna road. It is in sandstone, and consists of a square stone with a round top carrying a circular cast iron plate indicating the distance in miles to Carlisle. On the top is a bench mark.	II
Milestone; 55.00941°N 2.98954°W	—	Early 19th century	The milestone was provided for the Longtown to Gretna road. It is in sandstone, and consists of a square stone with a round top carrying a circular cast iron plate indicating the distance in miles to Carlisle.	II
Milestone; 54.99091°N 3.04957°W	—	Early 19th century	The milestone was provided for the Carlisle to Glasgow Turnpike. It is in sandstone, and consists of a stone with curved face and a round top carrying a cast iron plate indicating the distance in miles to Carlisle and to Glasgow. On the top is a bench mark.	II
Milestone; 55.04121°N 2.96113°W	—	Early 19th century	The milestone was provided for the Edinburgh to Longtown Turnpike. It is in sandstone, and consists of a square stone with a round top carrying a circular cast iron plate indicating the distance in miles to Carlisle.	II
Milestone; 55.01679°N 2.98375°W	—	Early 19th century	The milestone was provided for the Longtown to Edinburgh Turnpike. It is in sandstone, and consists of a square stone with a round top carrying a circular cast iron plate indicating the distance in miles to Carlisle.	II
Milestone; 55.05357°N 2.92565°W	—	Early 19th century	The milestone was provided for the Longtown to Penton road. It is in sandstone, and consists of a square stone with a round top carrying a circular cast iron plate indicating the distance in miles to Carlisle.	II
Toll Bar Cottage; 55.01150°N 2.98093°W	—	Early 19th century	Originally a toll house, later a private house, it was provided for the Edinburgh to Longtown Turnpike. The house is stuccoed with stone dressings and a hipped slate roof. There is a single storey and two bays. The doorway has a pointed Tudor-style arch. There is a central bay window with a segmental head containing sash windows with chamfered surrounds, and with hood moulds.	II
Screen walls, Kirkandrews Tower; 55.03801°N 2.95761°W	—	1827	The walls project from the west and north walls of the tower, and are partly in brick and partly in sandstone. They are 3 metres (9.8 ft) high and have higher entrances. The walls contains archways and mullioned windows, some of which are blocked, and have battlemented parapets.	II
Farmhouse and barn, Kirkandrews Tower; 55.03784°N 2.95822°W	—	1827 (probable)	The farmhouse and barn are in sandstone and river cobbles, and have green slate roofs. The house has two storeys and four bays, and the barn at right angles has two bays, forming an L-shaped plan. There are two doorways with fanlights, and the doorways and sash windows have plain surrounds. In the barn are plank doors and a casement window.	II
Riddings Junction Viaduct; 55.07122°N 2.92437°W		1864	The viaduct was built for the North British Railway to carry the railway over Liddel Water. It is in sandstone and consists of nine skewed arches carried on tapering piers. The viaduct has channelled voussoirs, and a 20th-century brick parapet with concrete copings.	II*
