= Rowanburn =

Coordinates: 55.086°N 2.926°W

- Location within Dumfries and Galloway
- Council area: Dumfries and Galloway
- Country: Scotland
- Sovereign state: United Kingdom
- Police: Scotland
- Fire: Scottish
- Ambulance: Scottish

Rowanburn is a hamlet in Eskdale, Dumfries and Galloway, Scotland. Located near Canonbie, it sits around 5 miles south-east of Langholm and about a mile from the Anglo-Scottish border.

Rowanburn was founded as a coal mining community to house miners from the Canonbie Coalfield in the late 19th century. There is a memorial to the now-closed coal mines in the hamlet. To the south, there is the Riddings Viaduct, a nine-span railway viaduct built in 1864 for the Border Union Railway.

Several farms in the area were devastated by the 2001 foot and mouth crisis which spread rapidly via the local livestock market at Longtown.

The only village shop, and garden centre, closed in 2003.
