= Moot Hall, Brampton =

Judicial building in Brampton, Cumbria, England

The Moot Hall
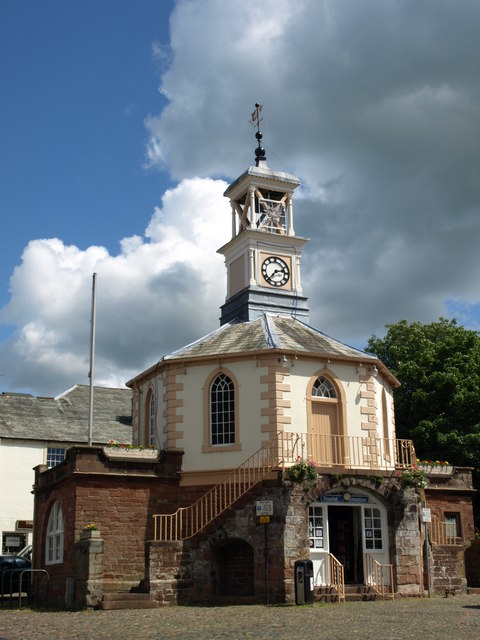
- The Moot Hall

- Shown in Cumbria
- 54.9422°N 2.7341°W
- Location: The Market Place, Brampton

History
- Built: 1817

Site notes
- Architectural style: Vernacular style

Listed Building – Grade II*
- Official name: Moot Hall
- Designated: 1 April 1957
- Reference no.: 1137330

The Moot Hall is a municipal building in The Market Place in Brampton, Cumbria, England. The building, which is used as a local tourist information office and as a meeting place for Brampton Parish Council, is a Grade II* listed building.

== History ==
The first moot hall in the Market Place in Brampton dated back at least to the mid-17th century. The Parliamentary forces of Oliver Cromwell, led by Major-General John Lambert, held 48 prisoners in the building in 1648 during the Second English Civil War. Then, in November 1745, the area in front of the moot hall hosted the Army of the Young Pretender, Charles Edward Stuart, as he laid siege to Carlisle Castle during the Jacobite rising.

The present building was commissioned by the lord of the manor, Frederick Howard, 5th Earl of Carlisle, whose seat was at Naworth Castle. It was designed in the Vernacular style, built in rubble masonry with a stucco finish and was completed in 1817. The design involved an octagonal structure facing west onto the Market Place. The first floor was faced with a stucco finish and there were quoins at the corners. There was a segmental-shaped opening with voussoirs on the ground floor flanked, on both sides, by a stone staircase with wrought iron railings which gave access to the first floor. On the first floor there was an arched doorway with an architrave at the front, and arched windows with architraves on the other sides. At roof level there was a clock tower with a belfry surmounted by an ogee-shaped roof, a ball finial and a weather vane. Internally, the principal rooms were the market hall on the ground floor and an assembly hall on the first floor. The ground floor was originally open and was used to sell poultry and dairy products. A ring to tether bulls for the purpose of bull-baiting was installed in the cobbles in front of the building, although this practice was outlawed by the Cruelty to Animals Act 1835.

George Howard, 9th Earl of Carlisle presented the building to Brampton Parish Council on 25 January 1896; work was initiated at that time to enclose the ground floor, and a plaque to commemorate the work of the local poet, Peter Burn, was installed on the staircase after he died in 1902.

The ground floor room subsequently became the home of the local tourist information office, while the assembly room on the first floor became the meeting place of Brampton Parish Council, and farmers' markets continued to be held on the last Saturday of every month in front of the moot hall.

== See also ==
- Grade II* listed buildings in Cumberland
- Listed buildings in Brampton, Carlisle
