= St Martin's Church, Brampton =

Coordinates: 54.9417°N 2.7379°W

St Martin's Church
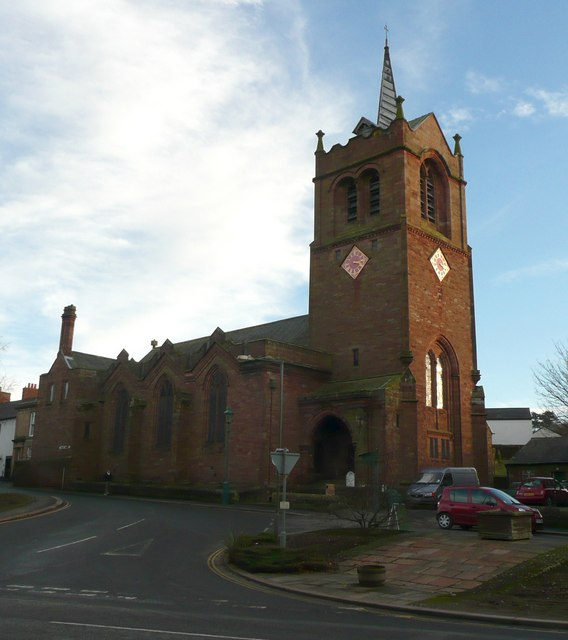
- St Martin's Church from the northwest

- Location in the former Carlisle district, Cumbria Location in Cumbria, England
- OS grid reference: NY 528 610
- Location: Front Street, Brampton, Cumbria
- Country: England
- Denomination: Anglican
- Website: St Martin, Brampton

History
- Status: Parish church
- Dedication: St Martin
- Consecrated: 11 November 1878

Architecture
- Functional status: Active
- Heritage designation: Grade I
- Designated: 16 January 1984
- Architect: Philip Webb
- Architectural type: Church
- Style: Gothic Revival
- Groundbreaking: 1874
- Completed: 1906

Administration
- Province: York
- Diocese: Carlisle
- Archdeaconry: Carlisle
- Deanery: Brampton

Clergy
- Vicar: Revd Stephen Robertson

St Martin's Church is in Front Street, Brampton, Cumbria, England. It is an active Anglican parish church in the deanery of Brampton, the archdeaconry of Carlisle and the diocese of Carlisle. It is recorded in the National Heritage List for England as a designated Grade I listed building and is the only church designed by the Pre-Raphaelite architect Philip Webb. The architectural historian Nikolaus Pevsner described it as "a very remarkable building".

== History ==
The church was built on the site of a former late 17th-century hospital that had been converted into a chapel in 1789. It was built for George Howard, who later became the 9th Earl of Carlisle, together with other contributors, and was constructed between 1874 and 1878; the tower was added in 1906. The architect was Philip Webb who was closely connected with the Pre-Raphaelite Brotherhood; it is the only church designed by Webb. It was the successor to Brampton Old Church, situated about 1 mile (2 km) to the west of the town centre.

== Architecture ==
=== Exterior ===
St Martin's is built in red sandstone from Wetheral quarry; it has green slate roofs and a lead spire. Its plan consists of a square west tower, a four-bay nave with north and south aisles, and a single-bay chancel with a two-storey vestry to the north and an organ chamber to the south; the body of the church is almost square. On the north side of the tower is an open arched porch with a lean-to roof. The west face contains two small two-light windows over which is a larger two-light window; all these windows are recessed within an arch. Above these are clock faces on all sides of the tower over which are two-light louvred bell-openings. At the top of the tower are gables to the west and east, and shaped parapets to the north and south. On the tower is a short pointed spire with extensions to the north and south. On the north side of the church are three two-light windows separated by buttresses, and over each window is a battlemented gable. The south aisle has a round west window, and on the south side are small rectangular windows and three gabled dormers in the clerestory. On the south wall of the organ chamber is a three-light Perpendicular style window. The east window has five lights.

=== Interior ===
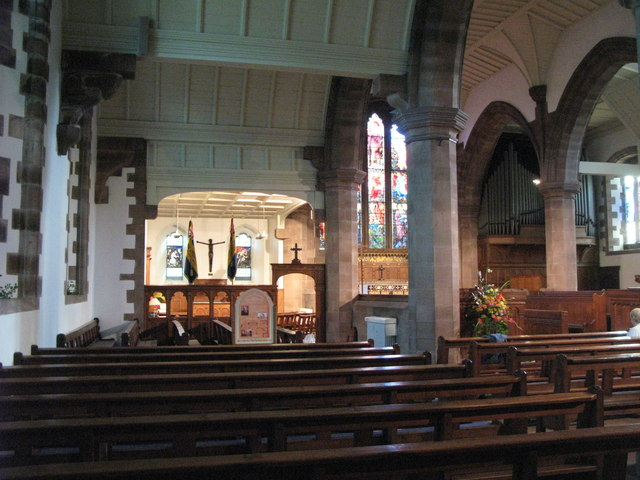
Interior of St Martin's Church

The entrance leads into the base of the tower that acts as a porch and a baptistry; this leads in turn through two arches into the nave. Above the arches is a clear four-light window that is lit by the window in the west wall of the tower. All the ceilings are of painted wood; that of the north aisle is a tunnel vault, the south aisle ceiling is sloping, and the ceiling of the nave and chancel is flat. On each side of the nave is a four-bay arcade supported by octagonal piers; there is no chancel arch. All the stained glass was made in 1878–80 by Morris & Co. and designed by Edward Burne-Jones and William Morris. The five-light east window contains three tiers of figures. The central figure at the top is the Good Shepherd, and on each side are angels, the middle tier consists of angels, the central image in the lowest tier is a pelican, bounded on each sides by saints. The east window was a memorial to Charles Howard, MP, brother of the 8th Earl of Carlisle. The font dates from the 13th century.

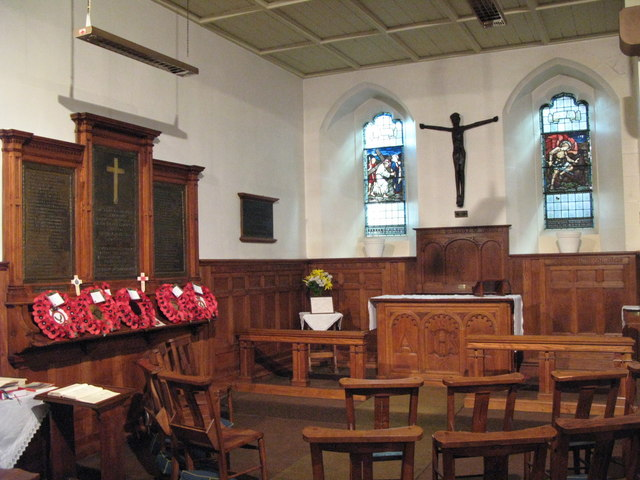
Soldiers' Chapel

To the north of the chancel is a war memorial chapel, with the vestry on the floor above. The chapel contains an altar panel by Byam Shaw, and a carpet with a William Morris design. The three-manual organ was built about 1920 by Jardine & Co. of Manchester. It was rebuilt in 2008 by Nicholson & Co. of Malvern. There is a ring of six bells that were cast in 1826 by Thomas Mears II of the Whitechapel Bell Foundry.

== External features ==
To the west of the church is St Martin's Hall, built in 1895 and designed by C. J. Ferguson. It is constructed in red sandstone with green slate roofs. The building is in two ranges, with three-bay meeting rooms in front and a five-bay hall behind. The hall is listed at Grade II. It now houses an antiques centre. Between the church and the hall is Church Cottage. This is also constructed in red sandstone with a slate roof, and pre-dates the church, being built in the early 19th century. It is a small building in one storey and two bays. In about 2000 it was being used as a chiropodist's surgery and a probation office. It is also listed Grade II.

== Present day ==
The church holds services on Sundays and during the week and works in the local community. In the summer, a series of concerts is organised in the church. During 2009 the church was damaged by vandals, which led to a decision to lock it during the day.

In 2025, the church applied for a faculty to install a lift alongside the main staircase, to provide access to elderly and disabled parishioners and visitors. The chancellor refused the application was declined because it would damage the historic interest of the church, and because he considered that an alternative proposal from The Victorian Society had not been adequately explored.

== See also ==
- Grade I listed churches in Cumbria
- Grade I listed buildings in Cumbria
- Listed buildings in Brampton, Carlisle
