= Listed buildings in Brampton, Cumberland =

Brampton is a civil parish in Cumbria, England. It contains 84 listed buildings that are recorded in the National Heritage List for England. Of these, four are listed at Grade I, the highest of the three grades, four are at Grade II*, the middle grade, and the others are at Grade II, the lowest grade. The parish contains the town of Brampton, the village of Milton, and the surrounding countryside. The largest building in the parish is Naworth Castle; this and associated structures are listed. Being near the Scottish border, many of the buildings were fortified, and some bastle houses (fortified farmhouses) have survived, usually much altered. Most of the listed buildings are in or near the centre of the town of Brampton, and include houses, shops, public houses, hotels, offices and banks, a police station, a church, and the moot hall. In the countryside there are listed farmhouses and farm buildings. The other listed buildings include milestones provided for the turnpikes in the parish, bridges, monuments, and a shelter.

== Key ==
Grade	Criteria
I	Buildings of exceptional interest, sometimes considered to be internationally important
II*	Particularly important buildings of more than special interest
II	Buildings of national importance and special interest

== Buildings ==
Name and location	Photograph	Date	Notes	Grade
St Martin's Church; 54.94625°N 2.76632°W		12th century	The church was extended in the late 12th or early 13th century, but was mainly demolished in 1788, the porch was added in 1861, and alterations were carried out in 1891. It is in sandstone and has a roof of slate with coped gables and a cross finial. Only the chancel and the west porch have survived, and there is a belfry on the west gable. There is a narrow Norman lancet window in the north wall, the other windows dating from 1891.	II*
Naworth Castle; 54.95601°N 2.68873°W		Late 13th century (probable)	The castle originated as a fortified house and was extended during the following centuries. Part of it was damaged by fire in 1844, and it was restored by Anthony Salvin. The castle is built in red sandstone and calciferous sandstone, it has roofs of slate and lead, and it forms an irregular quadrilateral plan. The east range contains the residential quarters, it has two storeys and nine bays, and is flanked by three-storey one-bay towers. The north range contains a two-storey two-bay tower and a two-storey nine-bay hall. The west range has three storeys and six bays; originally the servants' quarters, it has been converted into flats, and on the south side is a curtain wall.	I
Old Church Farmhouse; 54.94665°N 2.76607°W	—	Early 14th century (probable)	This originated as a vicar's tower house, and was extended in the 18th and 19th centuries. The tower is in sandstone on a chamfered plinth with a slate roof, the 18th-century extension is in brick, and the 19th-century additions are in sandstone with a slate roof. The tower has three storeys and one bay, with angle buttresses, and windows of varying types. The extension has two storeys and three bays, some windows are sashes, and others are casements. On the front is a single-storey single-bay extension containing a doorway.	II*
Boat House, Naworth Castle; 54.95599°N 2.68836°W	—	c. 1520	Originally a fuel store, it was converted into a studio by Philip Webb in the 1870s, and later used as a garage. It is free-standing in front of the east wing of the castle, and is built in red sandstone and calciferous sandstone. The building is in the form of a roughly square tower in 1 1/2 storeys with a battlemented parapet. It contains garage doors and small windows.	I
Gatehouse, Naworth Castle; 54.95578°N 2.68865°W	—	c. 1520	The gatehouse was built as part of the inner bailey of the castle, and was extended in about 1602. It has two storeys and two bays. The lower part is in calciferous sandstone, and the upper parts are in red sandstone with a battlemented parapet. The gatehouse has a round-headed entrance, over which is a carved coat of arms. The entrance is flanked by small casement windows with chamfered surrounds.	I
Byre, Cumcatch; 54.94322°N 2.70748°W	—	Late 16th century	Originally a bastle house, it was altered and extended in the 19th century. The only surviving part is the northeast wall, which is very thick, built in rubble, and with a Welsh slate roof. It probably had two storeys and three bays, and is now surrounded by later additions.	II
Scarrow Hill; 54.94955°N 2.67375°W	—	1601	Originally a house, then used as a coaching inn, after which it was divided into two cottages before reverting to a single dwelling. It is in calciferous sandstone with red sandstone window surrounds, and has quoins and a slate roof. There are two storeys, four bays, and single-storey porches. Most of the windows are sashes, and there is a two-light mullioned window. The building has relatively thin walls compared with the houses that were being built locally at the time.	II
Breconhill; 54.95490°N 2.73832°W	—	1663	The farmhouse was extended in the late 18th century. It is stuccoed with stone dressings and has a Welsh slate roof. There are two storeys and five bays. The doorway has a chamfered surround, a pointed head, and an inscribed and dated lintel. The windows have been enlarged, and contain sashes.	II
23, 23A and 25 Front Street; 54.94185°N 2.73600°W	—	Late 17th century	Originally a house, later shops with accommodation above, the building is stuccoed with stone dressings, eaves modillions, and it has a Welsh slate roof with a coped gable. There are two storeys with attics, and four bays. No. 23 has a 20th-century shop front, No. 25 has a 19th-century shop window, the windows in the upper floor are sashes, and in the attic they are casements.	II
10 Longtown Road; 54.94211°N 2.73943°W	—	Late 17th century	A stuccoed house with stone dressings and a Welsh slate roof. There are two storeys and three bays, and the windows are sashes.	II
Nag's Head Public House; 54.94204°N 2.73446°W		Late 17th century	This probably originated as two houses that were converted into one building in the early 19th century. The public house is stuccoed with stone dressings, and it has a green slate roof with ridge tiles. There are two storeys and four bays. The left two bays project forward and contain an entrance with a moulded and chamfered surround, over which is a casement window. The other windows are sashes with varying surrounds.	II
Oulton House; 54.94156°N 2.74141°W	—	Late 17th century	The house is stuccoed on a chamfered plinth, with quoins and a tiled roof with coped gables. There are three storeys, three bays, and a rear extension. The entrance has a chamfered surround, the windows in the lower two floors are sashes in plain surrounds, and in the top floor they are casements in chamfered surrounds. In the rear extension is a round-headed stair window.	II
Prince Charlie's House; 54.94271°N 2.73436°W		Late 17th century	A shop with living accommodation above, stuccoed with stone dressings, quoins, and a Welsh slate roof with coped gables. It has two storeys and three bays with a two-storey two-bay extension to the left. The doorway is round-headed and has a quoined surround. In the ground floor are shop windows and in the upper floor the windows are sashes with stone surrounds. On the front is a plaque stating that the building was used as headquarters by Bonnie Prince Charlie in 1745.	II
Crooked Holme Farmhouse; 54.94968°N 2.76534°W	—	Early 18th century	A sandstone farmhouse that has a slate roof with stepped coped gables. There are two storeys, three bays, and two-bay outbuildings to the right. The windows are sashes in plain surrounds.	II
Cumcatch; 54.94296°N 2.70790°W	—	Early 18th century	A rendered farmhouse with stone dressings and a Welsh slate roof. There are two storeys and five bays. On the front is a 19th-century sandstone porch with a hipped slate roof and a doorway with a shaped head. The windows are sashes with stone surrounds.	II
Hollinstone Farmhouse; 54.93264°N 2.78332°W	—	Early 18th century	The farmhouse is in sandstone with quoins, and has a slate roof with coped gables. There are two storeys and three bays. The doorway has a plain surround and a fanlight, and the windows, which are sashes, also have plain surrounds. There is an extension to the left in rubble without any windows.	II
Middle Farmhouse; 54.93783°N 2.76423°W	—	Early 18th century	The farmhouse is in sandstone with a slate roof, and has two storeys and four bays. The doorway has a quoined surround, and the windows are sashes with plain surrounds.	II
Scotch Arms Hotel; 54.94270°N 2.73577°W		Early 18th century	A stuccoed public house with quoins, a moulded cornice, and a slate roof. It has three storeys and three bays, with a two-storey two-bay extension to the left. Above the entrance is a flattened elliptical hood on console brackets, with reeded pilaster strips and decorated capitals. The doorway has a pilaster strip surround with a scalloped keystone, and the windows are sashes in plain stone surrounds.	II
White Lion Hotel; 54.94263°N 2.73468°W		Early 18th century	Possibly originally two houses, the hotel was altered and extended in the 19th century. It is stuccoed with stone dressings, and has a Welsh slate roof with a tile ridge, and gables with finials. There are three storeys and five bays. The doorway has a plain surround and a moulded cornice, and the windows, which are casements, also have plain surrounds.	II
Irthing Bridge; 54.95312°N 2.76228°W		1729 (probable)	The bridge carries the A6077 road over the River Irthing. It is in sandstone, and consists of three arches on two piers with splayed cutwaters. The bridge is hump-backed and has a single carriageway.	II
The Barracks; 54.94250°N 2.73442°W	—	Mid-18th century	Originally two houses at right angles to each other, later shops. In 1745 they were used as quarters for troops supporting Bonnie Prince Charlie. They are in brick with quoins and Welsh slate roofs. The shops have three storeys, and fronts of three, three and two bays. In the ground floor are shop windows and doors, and above are sash windows with moulded sills and round arches with keystones.	II
Walled garden, Naworth Castle; 54.95540°N 2.68738°W	—	18th century (probable)	The garden wall occupies three, and partly four, of the sides of the previous moat. It is in red sandstone and calciferous sandstone, and is 2 metres (6 ft 7 in) high. At the southeast corner is a semicircular projection.	II
Milestone; 54.95067°N 2.67807°W	—	1758 (probable)	The milestone was provided for the Carlisle to Newcastle Military Road, later the Carlisle to Temon Turnpike. It is in sandstone, chamfered to give two faces. On the faces are cast iron plates inscribed with the distances in miles to Carlisle and to Newcastle.	II
Milestone; 54.94722°N 2.70191°W	—	1758 (probable)	The milestone was provided for the Carlisle to Newcastle Military Road, later the Carlisle to Temon Turnpike. It is in sandstone, chamfered to give two faces. On the faces are cast iron plates inscribed with the distances in miles to Carlisle and to Newcastle.	II
Milestone; 54.94343°N 2.72506°W	—	1758 (probable)	The milestone was provided for the Carlisle to Newcastle Military Road, later the Carlisle to Temon Turnpike. It is in sandstone, chamfered to give two faces. On the faces are cast iron plates inscribed with the distances in miles to Carlisle and to Newcastle.	II
Milestone; 54.93962°N 2.74880°W	—	1758 (probable)	The milestone was provided for the Carlisle to Newcastle Military Road, later the Carlisle to Temon Turnpike. It is in sandstone, chamfered to give two faces. On the faces are cast iron plates inscribed with the distances in miles to Carlisle and to Newcastle.	II
Milestone; 54.93578°N 2.77258°W	—	1758 (probable)	The milestone was provided for the Carlisle to Newcastle Military Road, later the Carlisle to Temon Turnpike. It is in sandstone, chamfered to give two faces. On the faces are cast iron plates inscribed with the distances in miles to Carlisle and to Newcastle.	II
7, 9 and 11 Front Street; 54.94189°N 2.73522°W	—	Late 18th century	Originally the Eden Hotel, later used as a shop with living accommodation above. It is stuccoed with stone dressings and a slate roof. There are three storeys and two bays. In the ground floor are 20th-century shop windows and doors, and above are three-light sash windows.	II
27 Front Street; 54.94183°N 2.73615°W	—	Late 18th century	Originally a house, later used as a café, it is stuccoed with stone dressings and a slate roof. It has three storeys, one bay, a shop entrance and window in the ground floor and sash windows with plain surrounds in the upper floors.	II
45 and 47 Front Street; 54.94168°N 2.73734°W	—	Late 18th century	A shop with rendered walls on a stone plinth, with stone dressings and a Welsh slate roof. There are two storeys and three bays. The shop doorway is flanked by shop windows with panelled surrounds, and to the right is another doorway. The windows in the upper floor are sashes in stone surrounds.	II
5, 7 and 9 High Cross Street; 54.94247°N 2.73469°W	—	Late 18th century	Originally houses and later two shops, they have a stuccoed front, and the right side has sandstone in the ground floor and brick above. There are quoins on the right corner and a Welsh slate roof. The shops have 3 1/2 storeys and one bay each. Both have shop windows in the ground floor, and sash windows above, other than the attic window in No. 7, which is a casement window.	II
Bank House; 54.94251°N 2.73676°W	—	Late 18th century	A pair of stuccoed houses with a slate roof, in two storeys and with sash windows. No. 56 has one bay, and the door and windows have plain surrounds. No. 58 has two bays, its door has an alternate block surround, a keyed entablature and a moulded cornice, and the windows have moulded surrounds.	II
Howard Arms Hotel; 54.94188°N 2.73530°W		Late 18th century	Originally a coaching inn, the hotel is stuccoed on a chamfered plinth, and has quoins, stone dressings, and a slate roof. There are two storeys and three bays. The entrance has a plain surround and a wooden hood porch, and the windows are three-light sashes. At the rear is a three-storey three-bay extension.	II
Lorne Terrace; 54.94175°N 2.73643°W	—	Late 18th century	A row of five buildings, two shops, two cafés, and a house, stuccoed or rendered, with quoins and a green slate roof. There are three storeys, and each building has two bays. The building on the right is the house, it has a former shop window in the ground floor, and the other buildings have shop fronts and entrances in the ground floor. In the upper floors are sash windows.	II
Tree House; 54.94079°N 2.72523°W	—	Late 18th century	A sandstone house with quoins, a plain cornice, and a slate roof. It has two storeys and three bays. The doorway has a plain surround with a radial fanlight, imposts, and a false keystone. The windows are sashes with plain surrounds.	II
Milestone; 54.95137°N 2.74978°W	—	1807	The milestone was provided for the Longtown to Brampton turnpike. It is in sandstone and consists of a square stone set at an angle. The stone is incised on the two sides with numbers indicating the distances in miles to Longtown and to Brampton.	II
Moot Hall; 54.94224°N 2.73411°W		1817	The Moot Hall replaced a 17th-century town hall, and was originally open until wings were added in 1896. It has an octagonal plan with two storeys, the lower storey is in sandstone, the upper storey is stuccoed with quoins, there is a green slate roof, and a wooden tower with a lead latticed cupola. In the ground floor is a round-headed porch and an external staircase. The extensions contain round-headed windows. In the upper floor are windows and a doorway with pointed heads, and above the door is a fanlight. The tower has engaged columns and a clock, and the cupola is surmounted by a weathervane. Other features are iron stocks and a bench mark, and nearby in the cobbles is a bull ring.	II*
Thompson Brothers Meals; 54.94286°N 2.73376°W	—	1818	Originally Zion Chapel, later a warehouse, the building is in sandstone with quoins, and a Welsh slate roof with a coped gable. On the north side is a projecting gabled porch that has an entrance with a pilaster strip surround and a moulded cornice, above which is a casement window. To the left is an extension with a sash window. Some of the windows on the sides of the building are round-headed with keystones.	II
12–22 Market Place; 54.94228°N 2.73370°W	—	1819	A row of shops and a restaurant, with living accommodation above, they are stuccoed on a plinth with stone dressings, quoins, a cornice, and a green slate roof. The buildings have two storeys and nine bays. On the ground floor are 20th-century doors and shop windows, and in the upper floor the windows are sashes.	II
Lawson Masonic Hall; 54.94220°N 2.73361°W	—	1819	The hall is in brick on a stone plinth with a string course and a green slate roof. There are two storeys and six bays. On the front is a stepped Tuscan portico, with four columns, a moulded entablature and a cornice. The door has a fanlight and side window in a Venetian-style surround. The bays to the left of the portico are original and have sash windows with stone lintels and sills; to the right they are in 20th-century brick with re-used windows, sills and lintels.	II
13, 15 and 17 Carlisle Road; 54.94170°N 2.73971°W	—	Early 19th century	A row of three sandstone houses on a chamfered plinth, with a Welsh slate roof. There are two storeys, and each house has three bays. The windows are sashes in plain surrounds. The doorways to Nos. 13 and 17 have radial fanlights and round heads with false keystones.	II
52 Front Street; 54.94184°N 2.73731°W	—	Early 19th century	A house on a corner site, in sandstone with quoins, with a Welsh slate roof that has a tiled ridge. The building has an L-shaped plan, there are two storeys, and two bays on Front Street. The main entrance is on the corner; it has a quoined surround and a chamfered lintel. There is another entrance on the right return, approached by steps, with a fanlight. Most of the windows are sashes, with a former shop window in the ground floor.	II
54 and 56 Front Street; 54.94186°N 2.73750°W	—	Early 19th century	A pair of sandstone houses on a rusticated plinth, with eaves modillions and a Welsh slate roof. They have two storeys, No. 56 has two bays and No. 54 has one. The doors have fanlights, and most of the windows are sashes.	II
58 Front Street; 54.94186°N 2.73763°W	—	Early 19th century	A stuccoed house with quoins and a slate roof, in two storeys and three bays. The doorway has a quoined surround, and the sash windows have plain surrounds.	II
2 High Cross Street; 54.94239°N 2.73454°W		Early 19th century	Originally a house, later a shop, it is stuccoed with quoins, a moulded cornice, and a slate roof. There are three storeys and two bays. In the ground floor is a late 19th-century shop front, with decorated wooden surrounds to the door and windows, and a shaped and dentilled cornice. In the upper floors are sash windows in moulded surrounds.	II
31 and 33 Main Street; 54.94280°N 2.73546°W	—	Early 19th century	A shop and a house in two storeys, the ground floor being stuccoed, and the upper floor in sandstone. There are quoins to the right, the roof is slated, and each building has two bays. The door of No. 31 is flanked by shop windows, and the other windows are sashes in stone surrounds.	II
63 Main Street; 54.94235°N 2.73672°W	—	Early 19th century	A sandstone house on an ashlar plinth with a Welsh slate roof, it has two storeys and two bays. There are two doorways with patterned fanlights and reeded surrounds. Between the doorways is a large window, and in the upper floor the windows are sashes.	II
15 and 16 Milton Village; 54.93763°N 2.69596°W	—	Early 19th century	Originally three houses, now two, they are in sandstone, and No. 15 is rendered. They have Welsh slate roofs, and are in two storeys. No. 15 has two bays, and No.16 has three. They both have doorways with rusticated surrounds, and sash windows.	II
Bank Court; 54.94265°N 2.73662°W	—	Early 19th century	Originally a bank with three houses behind, later four houses. The former bank is in calciferous sandstone with rusticated quoins, and the houses are in red sandstone, and are partly rendered. All have a slate roof, and are in two storeys. The bank has two bays facing Main Street, and the houses have one or two bays. On the front is a projecting porch with an architrave and a moulded cornice, and above it is a pedimented gable. The windows are sashes in plain surrounds.	II
Barley Stack Inn; 54.94174°N 2.73945°W	—	Early 19th century	The building is in stone on a chamferde plinth, with quoins and a slate roof. There are two storeys and two bays. The doorway has a radial fanlight with a false keystone.	II
Cambeck Bridge; 54.95631°N 2.76743°W	—	Early 19th century	The bridge carries the A5071 road over the Cam Beck. It is in rusticated sandstone, and consists of two round arches on a single pier with rounded cutwaters. The bridge has pilastered abutments with a string course and a shaped parapet.	II
Cartmell Mawson and Main, Solicitor's office 54.94230°N 2.73683°W	—	Early 19th century	Originally two houses, later used as offices, in sandstone on a rusticated plinth, with eaves modillions and a slate roof. There are two storeys and four bays. The two doorways and the sash windows have plain stone surrounds, and above the doorways are cornices on console brackets.	II
Gatepiers and walls, Castlesteads; 54.95630°N 2.76660°W	—	Early 19th century	The gate piers and walls are in calciferous sandstone. The six piers have alternate blocks and pointed caps, the low walls are in a serpentine shape, and they have chamfered coping. The gate and railings are in cast iron.	II
Lodge, Castlesteads; 54.95635°N 2.76648°W	—	Early 19th century	The lodge is rendered on brick with a slate roof. It is in a single storey and has three bays. The lodge has a projecting porch, a round-headed doorway, and casement windows with round heads in flat arch surrounds.	II
Church Cottage; 54.94167°N 2.73812°W	—	Early 19th century	A sandstone cottage with a slate roof, in one storey and two bays. The doorway has a chamfered surround, and the casement windows have trefoil heads and quatrefoil openings.	II
Church House; 54.94170°N 2.73748°W	—	Early 19th century	The house is in calciferous sandstone on the front and red sandstone on the side. It has angle pilaster strips, a moulded cornice, and a slate roof. There are two storeys, with a single bay and the front and two bays at the side. Steps lead up to the doorway that has angle pilasters, moulded capitals, an entablature and a cornice. The windows are sashes in plain surrounds.	II
Cotehill Farmhouse; 54.95464°N 2.72879°W	—	Early 19th century	A brick farmhouse with sandstone quoins and dressings and a slate roof. It has two storeys and three bays. The door has a pilastered strip surround, a moulded cornice, and a patterned fanlight. The sash windows have plain surrounds.	II
Croft House; 54.94334°N 2.73863°W	—	Early 19th century	This originated as the Croft House Academy for boys, and it was extended in about 1840. The house is stuccoed with quoins and slate roofs. It has a recessed centre of two storeys and three bays, flanked by gabled extensions, on the left with two storeys and one bay, and on the right with 2 1/2 storeys and two bays. All the windows are sashes in moulded stone surrounds.	II
Mark Terrace; 54.94292°N 2.73570°W	—	Early 19th century	A row of three stuccoed houses with quoins, stone dressings, and a green slate roof. There are two storeys, and each house has a single bay. The doorways to the houses and to the yard entrance at the far right are round-headed with fanlights that have pilastered surrounds, moulded capitals, and decorated false keystones. The windows are sashes.	II
Gate piers and walls, Milton Lodge; 54.93441°N 2.70329°W	—	Early 19th century	The gate piers and walls are in calciferous sandstone. There are four octagonal piers with battlemented capitals joined by walls in serpentine shape. The railings and gate are in wrought iron.	II
Lodge, Milton Hall; 54.93452°N 2.70338°W	—	Early 19th century	The lodge is in stone, and has a Welsh slate roof with coped gables and finials. It has one storey and one bay. There is a gabled porch and gabled bay windows containing sashes, and a 20th-century extension to the north.	II
Post Office; 54.94192°N 2.73507°W		Early 19th century	Originally a house, later a post office, the building is in red and yellow sandstone, with quoins on the left and a Welsh slate roof. There are three storeys and two bays. In the ground floor are modern shop windows and doors, and above are casement windows with stone surrounds.	II
Solway Bakery and Dental Surgery; 54.94241°N 2.73435°W		Early 19th century	The building is stuccoed and has angle pilaster strips, stone dressings, a moulded cornice, and a slate roof. There are three storeys and two bays. In the ground floor is a modern shop window, the middle floor contains a large sash window with a moulded surround and a projecting cornice on console brackets, and in the top floor are two sash windows with moulded surrounds.	II
Trustee Savings Bank; 54.94239°N 2.73446°W	—	Early 19th century	Originally a house, later used for other purposes, it is stuccoed, with angle pilaster strips, a moulded and dentilled eaves cornice, and a Welsh slate roof. There are three storeys and three bays. Around the doorway is a moulded architrave, and the windows, which are sashes, have moulded stone surrounds.	II
Milestone; 54.92773°N 2.75176°W	—	1830	The milestone was provided for the Carlisle to Brampton turnpike. It is in sandstone, and consists of a square stone with a pyramidal top, and is set at an angle to the road. On each face is a cast iron plate inscribed with the distances in miles to Carlisle and to Brampton.	II
New Bridge Hotel; 54.96183°N 2.69926°W	—	1831	The hotel was extended in the late 19th century. It is in red sandstone with quoins and dressings in calciferous sandstone and with a slate roof. It has two storeys, the original part has three bays, and there is a single-bay gabled extension to the left in calciferous sandstone. The round-headed doorway has a fanlight, and pilasters with moulded capitals and a false keystone. The windows in the original part are sashes, and in the extension they are casements.	II
Ridge House; 54.94419°N 2.72628°W	—	1835	Formerly an inn, the house is in sandstone with a cornice and a hipped slate roof. It has two storeys and three bays. There is a prostyle Tuscan porch with a moulded entablature and a cornice. Above the door is a fanlight with a pilastered surround, and the windows are sashes in plain surrounds.	II
Garth House; 54.94575°N 2.74082°W	—	1830s	A sandstone house with rusticated quoins, a dentilled cornice, and a slate roof. It is mainly in two storeys, and has three bays. On the garden front are two canted bay windows with a moulded cornice. The entrance front is in 2 1/2 storeys, and it has a prostyle Ionic porch, a door with a fanlight, and a pedimented gable. The windows are sashes, the central windows having hoods on consoles brackets. There is a single storey extension to the right.	II
Prospect House; 54.94350°N 2.73517°W	—	1830s	A house in calciferous sandstone with angle pilasters, a string course, a moulded cornice, a parapet, and a slate roof with coped gables. There are two storeys and three bays. The porch has square columns, pointed arches on the sides and front, a moulded entablature and cornice, and above it is a balcony with cast iron balusters. The windows are sashes in plain surrounds, and above the central upper floor window is a cornice on consoles.	II
The Hollies; 54.94234°N 2.73728°W		1830s	Originally a house, later used as an old people's home, with a front of calciferous sandstone and sides of red sandstone, it has quoins, a moulded cornice, and a hipped slate roof. There are two storeys and three bays. The door has a fanlight with a pilaster strip surround, and a moulded entablature and cornice. The windows are sashes in moulded surrounds.	II
Laurel House; 54.94316°N 2.73474°W		1830s–1840s	The house, later used as a club, is in calciferous sandstone with stucco on the left side, and it has a moulded cornice and a slate roof. There are two storeys and three bays. On the front is a prostyle Ionic porch with a moulded entablature and a dentilled cornice. Above the door is a patterned fanlight with a pilastered surround, and the sash windows have moulded surrounds.	II
4 Market Place; 54.94233°N 2.73485°W		Mid-19th century	Offices in calciferous sandstone with dressings in polished Shap granite, a moulded and dentilled cornice, and a slate roof with coped gables and decorative ridge tiles. There are two storeys with attics, and four bays. The entrance has a moulded surround with granite columns and a shaped hood mould. The windows in the ground floor are casements with chamfered and moulded surrounds, central granite columns, and square hood moulds. In the upper floor the windows are sashes with central granite columns, in niches with pointed arches. Above is a gabled dormer with three lancet windows.	II
Barclays Bank; 54.94221°N 2.73561°W	—	Mid-19th century	The bank is in sandstone on a rusticated plinth, with a dentilled moulded cornice, a parapet, and a green slate roof. The windows in the ground floor are casements, and in the upper floor they are sashes with panels above.	II
Police Station and Magistrates Court; 54.94192°N 2.73947°W		Late 1860s	The building, which is on a corner site, was extended in 1902. It is in sandstone on a rusticated plinth, and has a Welsh slate roof with coped gables. There are two storeys, with four bays on Carlisle Road and a two-bay extension, and two bays on Longtown Road. The entrance on the corner has a projecting porch that has double pilaster strips with moulded capitals, an entablature with triglyphs, and a moulded cornice. The windows are sashes. There is a further building in Longtown Road with a lintel inscribed "POLICE STATION 1902" that has casement windows and two hipped dormers.	II
Monument, Brampton Mote; 54.94395°N 2.72997°W		1870	The monument is to the 7th Earl of Carlisle. It has a stepped plinth in calciferous sandstone and a square shaft, on which is a bronze figure dressed in the robes of a Knight of the Garter.	II
Mote Cottage; 54.94365°N 2.72772°W	—	c. 1870	An estate house in calciferous sandstone with bands of red sandstone, and a green slate roof with decorative ridge tiles and coped gables. There are two storeys and three bays. The doorway has side lights, a mullioned fanlight with a moulded surround and a pointed arch, and a shaped hood mould. On each side of it is a canted bay window. On the right side this continues up to a gabled dormer, and on left side it is in a single storey, and above it is a separate gabled dormer. All the windows are casements.	II
Greenlane House; 54.93939°N 2.74158°W	—	1877	Designed by Philip Webb as the vicarage for St Martin's Church, it is in sandstone with a slate roof. There are two storeys and five bays. The doorway has a chamfered surround, it is flanked by mullioned windows, and above is a flat-roofed dormer. On the right is a two-storey gabled bay with sash windows, and to the left is a bay in 1 1/2 storeys, with dentilled eaves and bargeboards, and it has sash and casement windows. On the garden front at the rear is a projecting central gabled canted bay, also with dentilled eaves and bargeboards, and with sash windows. Included in the listing are adjoining single-storey outbuildings.	II
St Martin's Church; 54.94166°N 2.73777°W		1877–78	This is the only church designed by Philip Webb, and the tower was completed by him in 1906. It is built in sandstone with a green slate roof and a lead spire. The church consists of a nave with aisles, a chancel with a north vestry and a south organ chamber, and a west tower incorporating a porch. The tower has a north entrance, a two-light west window, clock faces on three sides, a gabled roof with a shaped parapet, and a short pointed spire. Along the north side of the church are battlemented gables, in the south aisle is a round west window, and on the south side of the church are three gabled clerestory dormers.	I
Four Gables; 54.94722°N 2.71423°W	—	1879	A house designed by Philip Webb in sandstone with stone quoins, modillions, and dressings, and with a green slate roof with coped gables. It has 2 1/2 storeys and two bays, an extension with 1 1/2 storeys and three bays, and a single-storey stable block. On the front is a porch with a round-headed recess and a square-headed door. The windows vary; they include sash windows with chamfered surrounds and segmental pediments, casement windows with hood moulds, and mullioned windows, some of them being in dormers.	II*
Chemist's shop and bank 54.94208°N 2.73483°W		1883	Designed by C. J. Ferguson for a banking company, it was later divided into two units. They are in sandstone with a Welsh slate roof, and both have three storeys and three bays, one being used as a chemist's shop and the other as a bank. Both have sash windows and shaped gables. The shop has large round-headed shop windows. The bank has an entrance with pilasters, a rounded head, a moulded entablature, a cornice, and a wrought iron balcony. On its gable are ball finials.	II
St Martin's Hall; 54.94179°N 2.73843°W	—	1895	Designed by C. J. Ferguson, this consists of a three-bay meeting room, and a five-bay hall behind it, both in a single storey. They are in sandstone and have green slate roofs. The entrance to the meeting room has a moulded arched surround with reeded pilaster strips, a dentilled and decorated triangular pediment, and an entablature inscribed with the name and date. The windows are mullioned. In the hall, the windows are large and round-headed.	II
Capon Tree Monument; 54.93070°N 2.74180°W		1904	The monument is in sandstone, and consists of a tapering column on octagonal steps, surmounted by a circular head carved with a Celtic cross. It carries an inscription stating that it stands on the site of an ancient capon tree under which judges of the assize rested, and from which six supporters of the Stuart cause were executed in 1746.	II
Howard Memorial Shelter; 54.94348°N 2.72622°W		c.1930	The shelter is in calciferous sandstone with a stone slate roof, it has a single storey and an octagonal plan. The shelter is partly open, and has square columns that rise to form a vaulted roof. There is a central circular column surrounded by seats, and more seats are inside the closed parts of the sides. Around the shelter are stepped flags, and inside there is a brick herringbone floor.	II
Brackenfell; 54.93115°N 2.73721°W	—	1936–37	A house designed by Leslie Martin and Sadie Speight in Modernist style. It is in red brick with stone dressings and concrete lintels and roofs, and has two storeys. Features include a curved porte-cochère and a porch with a glass brick wall and an iron column.	II
