= Duddon furnace =

Blast furnace in Millom Without, Cumbria, England

Coordinates: 54.2840°N 3.2355°W

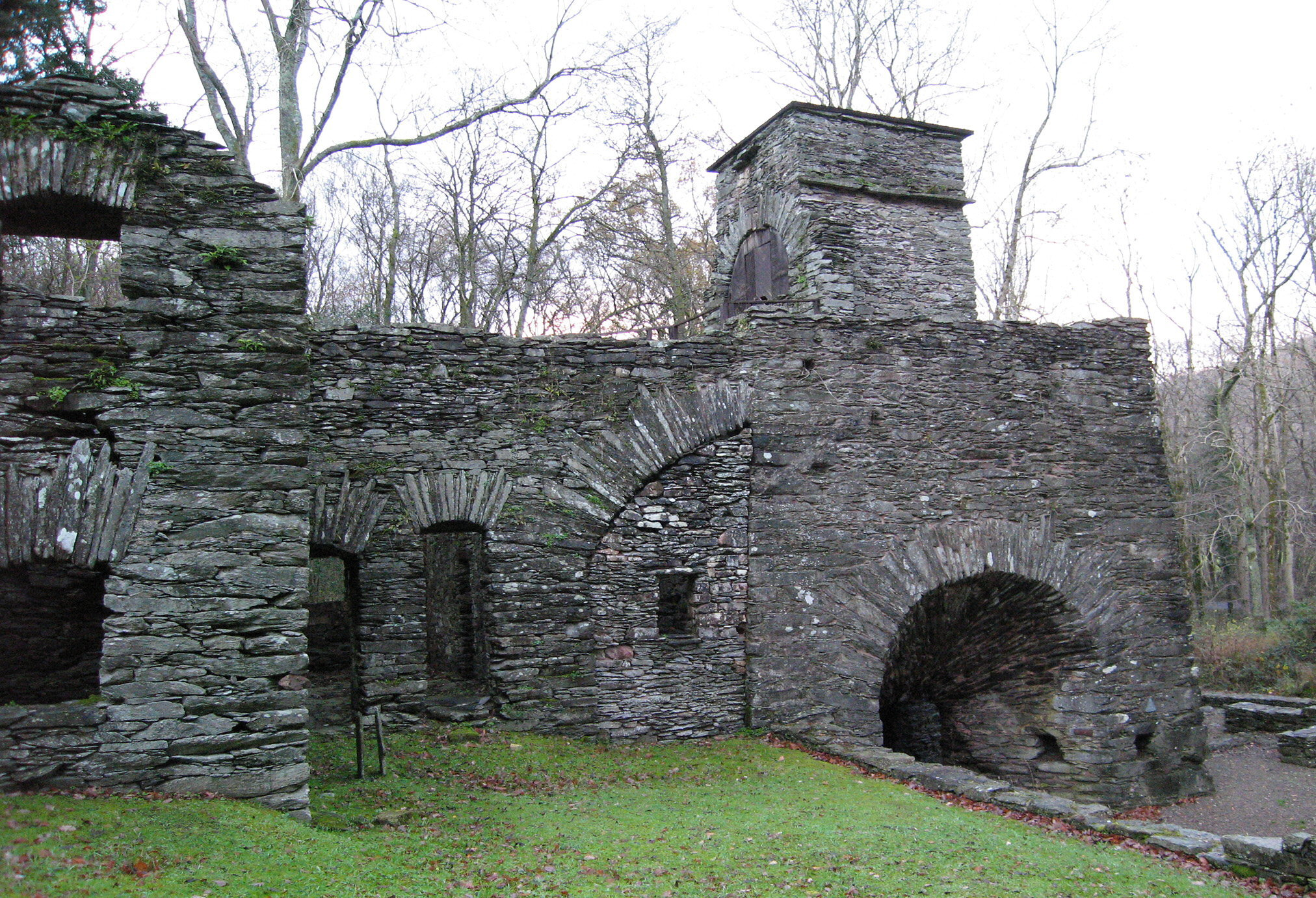
Duddon Furnace.

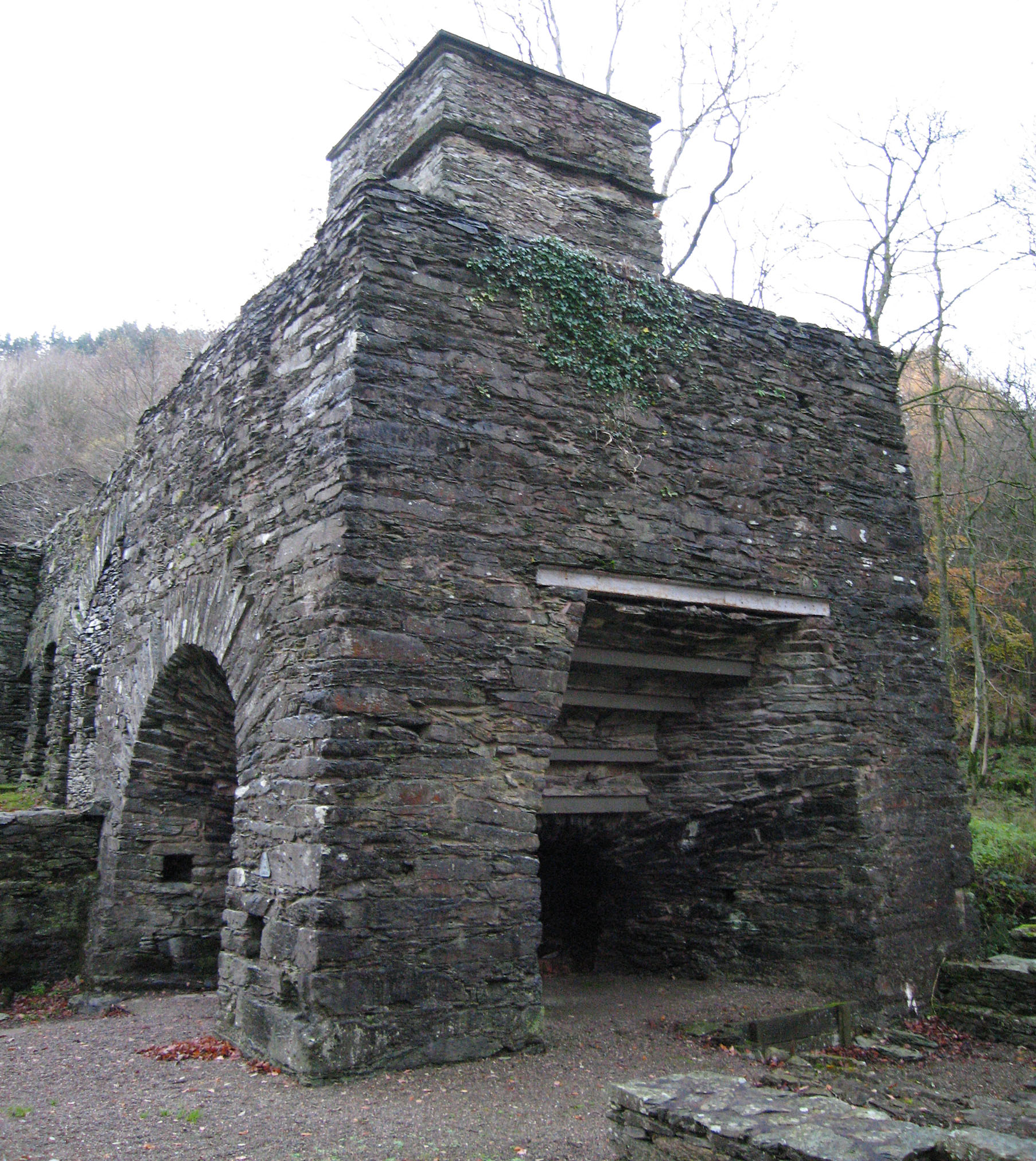
Close up of the furnace with the blowing arch on the right and the casting arch on the left.

The Duddon furnace (Grid Reference SD 197883) is a surviving charcoal-fuelled blast furnace near Broughton-in-Furness in Cumbria. It is on the west side of the River Duddon in the parish of Millom and formerly in Cumberland.

== History ==
The furnace was originally established as a joint venture of the Cunsey Company and the Backbarrow Company in 1736, but the Backbarrow Company sold their share to the Cunsey Company in 1741. The Cunsey Company already owned Cunsey Furnace and Spark Forge, but they closed Cunsey Furnace in 1750, thus becoming the Duddon Company. The partners in the Cunsey Company in 1737 were Edward Hall of Cranage, Warine Falkner of Rugeley, Thomas Cotton of Eardley (Cheshire) and Edward Kendall of Stourbridge. Following the deaths of several partners, the firm became Jonathan Kendall & Co. They also built Argyll Furnace (also called Craleckan or Goatfield) in 1755. The ironworks was managed by William Latham, who between 1772 and 1775 was shipping pig iron to Warren Sayes of Chepstow, but the sales were managed by Jonathan Kendall. Henry Kendall (a partner) died at Ulverston in 1787. William Latham's sons Richard and Joseph renewed the lease in 1790. They continued the works until 1828, when they sold it to Harrison Ainslie and Co., who operated it until 1867.

== Remains ==
The furnace stack, of local stone, is intact to its full height of 29 feet, but the hearth has been removed. It was powered from a leat from the River Duddon and was blown (at least latterly) by blowing cylinders, described by Morton. The bridge, leading to the charging platform, has rooms under it used for workers' housing. The charcoal barn is 100 feet long, and the iron ore store also survives. The site was investigated archaeologically in the 1980s, but only interim reports from this have been published.
