= Brampton, Cumberland =

Town and civil parish in Cumbria, England

Coordinates: 54.9409°N 2.7329°W

Brampton
- Town and parish
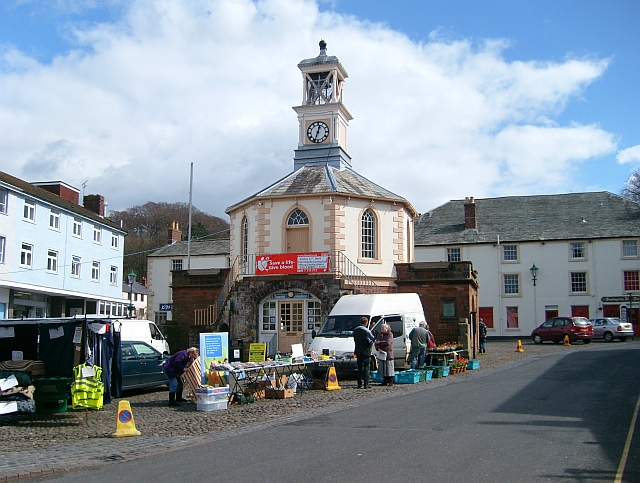
- The Moot Hall in the market place in Brampton in 2008

- Location within Cumbria
- Population: 4,545 (2021)
- OS grid reference: NY530609
- Civil parish: Brampton
- Unitary authority: Cumberland
- Ceremonial county: Cumbria
- Region: North West
- Country: England
- Sovereign state: United Kingdom
- Post town: BRAMPTON
- Postcode district: CA8
- Dialling code: 016977 (4&5 fig.) / 01697 (6 fig.)
- Police: Cumbria
- Fire: Cumbria
- Ambulance: North West
- UK Parliament: Carlisle

Brampton is a market town and civil parish in the Cumberland unitary authority area of Cumbria, England. It is 9 miles (14 km) east of Carlisle and 2 miles (3.2 km) south of Hadrian's Wall. Historically part of Cumberland, it is situated off the A69 road which bypasses it. In 2021 the parish had a population of 4,545. The parish of Brampton also covers the nearby hamlets of Milton and Naworth.

St Martin's Church is famous as the only church designed by the Pre-Raphaelite architect Philip Webb, and contains one of the most exquisite sets of stained glass windows designed by Sir Edward Burne-Jones, and executed in the William Morris studio.

== History ==
The town is thought to have been founded in the 7th century as an Anglian settlement.

The place-name 'Brampton' is first attested in Charter Rolls of 1252, where it appears as Braunton. In the Taxatio Ecclesiastica of 1291 it appears as Brampton. The name derives from the Old English 'Brōm-tūn', meaning "town or settlement where broom grew".

Its original church survives a couple of miles away to the west as Brampton Old Church, on the site of a Stanegate Roman fort.

The town is overlooked by the large medieval motte known as The Mote, which is surmounted by a statue of George Howard, 7th Earl of Carlisle.

Brampton was granted a Market Charter in 1252 by King Henry III, and became a market town as a result.

During the Jacobite rising of 1745, Charles Edward Stuart ('Bonnie Prince Charlie') stayed in the town for one night, marked by a plaque on the wall of the building (an antique shop) currently occupying the location; here he received the Mayor of Carlisle who had been summoned to Brampton to surrender the city to the Young Pretender. The Capon Tree Monument, to the south of the town centre, commemorates the 1746 hanging of six Jacobites from the branches of the Capon Tree, Brampton's hitherto traditional trysting place.

The octagonal Moot Hall, which is in the centre of Brampton and houses the tourist information office, was commissioned by Frederick Howard, 5th Earl of Carlisle in 1817. It replaced a 1648 building which was once used by Oliver Cromwell to house prisoners. To the right of its door can be seen the old town iron stocks affixed to the pavement.

The population in 1841 was 2,754 inhabitants.

Brampton was granted Fairtrade status on 6 January 2005, becoming one of the first hundred towns in the UK to be recognised in this way.

In 2011, Brampton became the 66th town in the United Kingdom and the second in Cumbria to gain Walkers are Welcome status.

== Transport ==
=== Bus ===
Service 685, operated jointly by Stagecoach Cumbria & North Lancashire and Stagecoach North East, provides an hourly service between Newcastle and Brampton via Corbridge, Hexham and Haltwhistle, with a twice-hourly service between Brampton and Carlisle via Warwick Bridge.

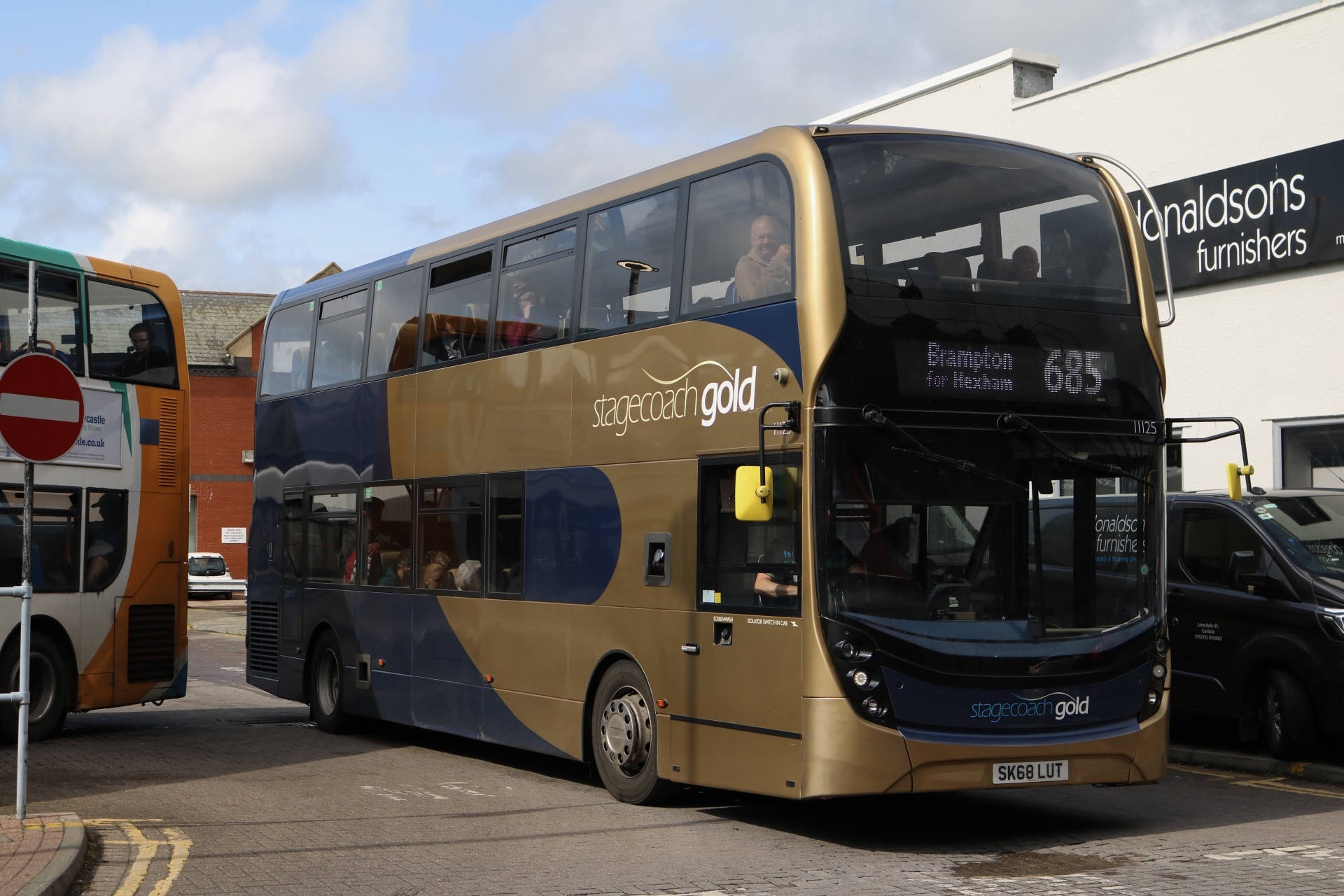
An Alexander Dennis Enviro400 MMC, operated by Stagecoach Cumbria & North Lancashire.

=== Rail ===
The town is served by Brampton (Cumbria) railway station, which is located around 1 mile (1.6 km) outside the town, in the nearby hamlet of Milton. The station, which opened in July 1836, is situated on the Tyne Valley Line, which runs between Newcastle and Carlisle via Hexham. There is an hourly service operating daily (with additional services operating at peak times). All services are operated by Northern Trains.

=== Road ===
The town is primarily served by the A69 trunk road, which runs between Denton Burn (around 4 miles (6.4 km) west of Newcastle) and Carlisle, serving a number of towns and villages along the route, including Heddon-on-the-Wall, Corbridge, Hexham, Haydon Bridge, Bardon Mill, Haltwhistle, Brampton and Warwick Bridge.

Other road connections include the A689, which runs between Carlisle and Teesside via Alston, and the A6071, which runs from the town to Gretna via Longtown.

== Governance ==
Brampton is in the parliamentary constituency of Carlisle. Currently Mark Green (former mayor) is running to reclaim his mayoral title after he stepped down in 2023 and the position was taken over by acting mayor Rodney Peart.

== Education ==
Brampton's secondary school is the William Howard School, known as Irthing Valley School until 1980 when it was amalgamated with Brampton's White House School and took on a larger catchment area, with pupils from as far away as Alston and Penrith.

== Culture ==
William Howard School was host to 'Brampton Live' every summer, an ever-growing music festival that, after its first appearance in 1995, became the largest folk/roots/world music festival in the North of England. Major artists included the Levellers, the Waterboys, Egudo Embako, Richard Thompson, Suzanne Vega, Loudon Wainwright III, Altan, Tommy Emmanuel, Seth Lakeman and many others. The last 'Brampton Live' took place in 2009 and has been, to a certain extent, replaced in 2012 by the 'Stepping Stones Festival' organised by Maddy Prior (of Steeleye Span) held in early May at the Brampton Community Centre.

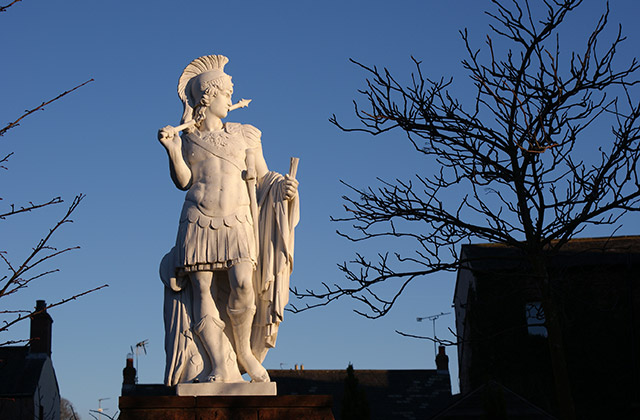
Located near the church, a modern statue of the Emperor Hadrian, whose Wall passed to the north of Brampton, though little survives locally

== Media ==
Local news and television programmes are provided by BBC North East and Cumbria and ITV Border. Television signals are received from the Caldbeck TV transmitter. Local radio stations are BBC Radio Cumbria, CRFM - Community Radio Station and Greatest Hits Radio Cumbria & South West Scotland. The town is served by the local newspaper, News and Star.

== Sport ==
The Brampton to Carlisle 10 Mile Road Race organised by Border Harriers & Athletic Club is the oldest 10 mile road race in the United Kingdom and is held in November. The first race was completed in 1952. Previous winners include Steve Cram and Ron Hill.

== Weather ==
Brampton has a Met Office Weather Station, established in 1999. It records weather data on a daily basis, which is forwarded to the Met Office.

Between 2001 and 2023, the highest temperature recorded was 35.4 °C (95.7 °F) on 19 July 2022 and the lowest was −12.1 °C (10.2 °F) on 3 December 2010.

Climate data for Brampton, 117m asl, 1991-2020, extremes 2001-2023
Month	Jan	Feb	Mar	Apr	May	Jun	Jul	Aug	Sep	Oct	Nov	Dec	Year
Record high °C (°F)	14.1 (57.4)	17.0 (62.6)	19.5 (67.1)	25.7 (78.3)	27.2 (81.0)	29.1 (84.4)	35.4 (95.7)	31.6 (88.9)	28.8 (83.8)	22.5 (72.5)	18.4 (65.1)	15.0 (59.0)	35.4 (95.7)
Mean daily maximum °C (°F)	4.8 (40.6)	5.3 (41.5)	7.3 (45.1)	10.4 (50.7)	13.7 (56.7)	16.2 (61.2)	18.0 (64.4)	17.4 (63.3)	15.1 (59.2)	11.3 (52.3)	7.6 (45.7)	5.2 (41.4)	11.0 (51.8)
Mean daily minimum °C (°F)	0.0 (32.0)	-0.0 (32.0)	0.9 (33.6)	2.4 (36.3)	4.9 (40.8)	7.9 (46.2)	9.8 (49.6)	9.8 (49.6)	7.8 (46.0)	5.1 (41.2)	2.4 (36.3)	0.2 (32.4)	4.3 (39.7)
Record low °C (°F)	−10.7 (12.7)	−6.4 (20.5)	−8.0 (17.6)	−4.1 (24.6)	−2.2 (28.0)	1.8 (35.2)	5.4 (41.7)	2.5 (36.5)	0.3 (32.5)	−3.2 (26.2)	−6.1 (21.0)	−12.1 (10.2)	−12.1 (10.2)
Average precipitation mm (inches)	123.6 (4.87)	99.6 (3.92)	91.5 (3.60)	75.7 (2.98)	78.5 (3.09)	95.7 (3.77)	115.0 (4.53)	127.8 (5.03)	105.5 (4.15)	126.9 (5.00)	125.7 (4.95)	136.9 (5.39)	1,302.4 (51.28)
Mean monthly sunshine hours	34.6	61.1	96.0	156.9	187.1	155.3	161.7	164.2	125.1	74.2	53.8	25.5	1,226.2
Source 1: Met Office
Source 2: Starlings Roost Weather

== Notable residents ==
Geoff Twentyman, a footballer who made over 150 appearances each for both Carlisle United and Liverpool, was born and brought up in Brampton; as a scout for Liverpool he recommended the likes of Kevin Keegan, John Toshack, Peter Beardsley and John Barnes, amongst others, to the managers he worked under. Altogether he spent twenty years as head scout of Liverpool F.C.

Li Yuan-chia (1929–1994) was a notable Chinese artist, poet and curator, and a significant influence on contemporary Chinese art. Born in Guangxi province, he lived the last twenty-six years of his life in Brampton, Cumbria, where he founded the LYC Gallery and Museum, which exhibited his own works and those of other notable artists.

== Brampton and Beyond Community Trust ==
Brampton and Beyond Community Trust is a community-based development trust serving Brampton and the surrounding area in north east Cumbria. The Trust is a registered company and a registered charity. The Trust aims to provide accessible, affordable and responsive services for local people and seeks to be self-financing. In 2011, Brampton and Beyond Community Trust formally took over the assets of the former Brampton Community Association, together with responsibility for the operation of the Brampton Community Centre. Subsequently, in 2015 the Trust negotiated the asset transfer of site which Brampton Community Centre occupies from Cumbria County Council making the Trust both the owners and operators of Brampton Community Centre.

== See also ==
- Listed buildings in Brampton, Cumberland
- Brampton, Ontario
