= Philip Day (businessman) =

British businessman (born 1965)

- Born: Philip Edward Day; October 1965 (age 60)
- Occupation: Businessman
- Title: Owner and CEO of Peacocks and The Edinburgh Woollen Mill
- Spouse: Debra Day (m. 1990)
- Children: 3

Philip Edward Day (born October 1965) is a Dubai-based British billionaire businessman. He is the CEO and owner of Peacocks and The Edinburgh Woollen Mill (which owns Bonmarché and Ponden Home).

As of May 2020, his net worth was £1.1 billion, according to the Sunday Times Rich List.

== Early life ==
Philip Edward Day was born in October 1965. He grew up on a council estate in Stockport and while at school he held down a number of part-time jobs, including working at his parents' newsagents shop.

Turning down a place at university, Day started his career at clothing manufacturers Coats Viyella and Wensum before being headhunted to join Aquascutum at the age of 28. He remained at the brand for 5 years, becoming Joint Managing Director.

== Career ==
In 2001, Day left Aquascutum and joined Edinburgh Woollen Mill, where he led a buyout of the company backed by Rutland Fund Management, a private equity firm. In 2002, he acquired the company for £67.5 million with the backing of Bank of Scotland. At the time, the company employed 3,140 people.

In 2008, EWM bought home furnishing company Ponden Mill and soft furnishings company Rosebys. The stores were rebranded as Ponden Home across the UK.

In 2009, Day bought Scottish golfing brand ProQuip for a reported £750,000. In 2011, Day acquired women's fashion retailer Jane Norman, which had fallen into administration.

In 2016, Day bought outfitters Austin Reed and Country Casuals from administration. Day said he planned to open 50 new Austin Reed stores by 2018.

In 2017, Day acquired British fashion brand Jaeger, again from administration. Day said the acquisition was part of EWM's plan to open a new department store.

In July 2019, Day's company, Spectre Holdings, had acquired 93% of the women's fashion chain Bonmarche.

=== Peacocks ===
In 2012, Day acquired fashion retailer Peacocks out of administration. Day is reported have put £200 million of his own money on the line for the acquisition. EWM bought 338 of the chain's stores and said that they would open another 50 stores. According to Forbes, the turnaround of Peacocks played a significant role in Day's success.

=== Days Department Store in Carmarthen ===
In May 2017, Day announced the Days Department Store, opening in the former BHS store in Guildhall Square, Carmarthen. The department store stocks products from a number of brands, including Peacocks, The Edinburgh Woollen Mill, Ponden Home, Jane Norman and Austin Reed.

According to Drapers in January 2018, Day plans to open more than 50 of the stores and has plans to open shops in Crawley and Bedford. However, the chain would only have the Carmarthen shop, with the planned Bedford location becoming divided into Peacocks and The Edinburgh Woollen Mill with a Ponden Home concession, and the Crawley shop becoming a Peacocks.

In November 2020, it was announced that the department store was closing, however this was U-turned with the rescue of The Edinburgh Woollen Mill in January 2021.

== Philanthropy ==
Day owns a wildlife sanctuary in Scotland which undertakes research into the preservation and reintroduction of endangered Scottish wildlife, including wolves and wildcats. The park has more than 14 species of deer. Day also owns the largest green energy Anaerobic Digester in the UK.

He was the main financial backer of Carlisle United F.C. although he says that he does not like football. He says he supports the team because otherwise it wouldn't exist. Though Day managed to plunge the football club into over £2.1million of debt when Edinburgh Woolen Mill itself entered administration. Edinburgh Woollen Mill was also the main shirt sponsor of the team.

== Personal life ==
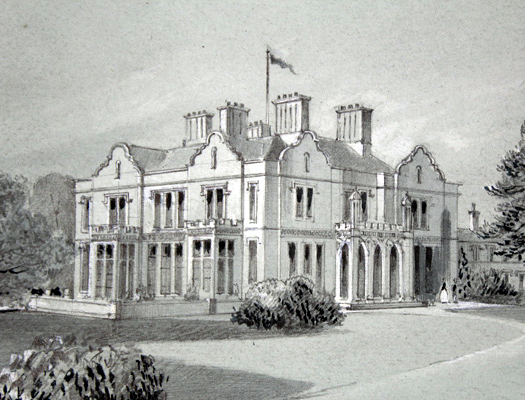
Edmond Castle, c. 1840–50. Drawing by Charles Greenwood or Frederick Peake.

Day has been married to his wife Debra since 1990. He owns Edmond Castle, a Tudor-style house in Brampton, Cumbria, England, built 1824 to 1829, and designed by Sir Robert Smirke. Day is keen on shooting, especially pheasant and duck, and has been a director of Carlisle United, the local football club.

They have two daughters and one son. In 2016, their daughter Lauren Day joined the Edinburgh Woollen Mill Group board as group development director. In 2010, their daughter Kirstie Day won Miss Cumbria; and a leaked email from EWM's head office to its stores ordered staff to vote for her to become Miss England, "I need and expect all stores to register a minimum of 10 votes today and I mean everybody!"

In 2013, Day was fined £450,000, ordered to pay £457,000 in costs, and called "grossly negligent" by the judge, for clearing part of Gelt Woods, near Brampton, and a Site of Special Scientific Interest (SSSI), for a pheasant shoot. Day later pursued a negligence claim against the solicitors who acted for him, on the basis that negligent advice resulted in excessive court costs in the criminal proceedings, that negligence claim was dismissed by the High Court on 3 December 2021.

In February 2014, Day was due in Dumfries Sheriff Court on a charge of driving without due care and attention, after admitting to driving at 83 mph and overtaking unsafely on the A7 between Auchenrivock and Canonbie in February 2012.

As of 2017, Day lives in Dubai, and "spends fewer than 10 days a year in the UK".
