= Listed buildings in Hayton, Cumberland =

Hayton is a civil parish in the Cumberland district of Cumbria, England. It contains 34 listed buildings that are recorded in the National Heritage List for England. Of these, two are listed at Grade II*, the middle of the three grades, and the others are at Grade II, the lowest grade. The parish contains the villages of Hayton and Talkin, and the smaller settlements of Heads Nook, Corby Hill, Faugh, Fenton, and Greenwell, and is otherwise rural. The listed buildings include houses and associated structures, farmhouses, farm buildings, churches and associated structures, bridges, a railway cutting, milestones, public houses, a war memorial, and a school.

== Key ==
| Grade | Criteria |
|---|---|
| II* | Particularly important buildings of more than special interest |
| II | Buildings of national importance and special interest |

== Buildings ==
| Name and location | Photograph | Date | Notes | Grade |
|---|---|---|---|---|
| Little Corby Hall; 54.90974°N 2.81638°W | — | 1702–08 | A farmhouse in sandstone with brick side walls, partly rendered. It is on a chamfered plinth, and has pilastered quoins, a moulded cornice, and a Welsh slate roof with coped gables. There are two storeys and seven bays. The doorway has a reeded pilaster surround and a fanlight, and the windows are sashes with moulded surrounds. The central three bays are quoined, and have a triangular pediment containing a carved coat of arms with a circular recess above. | II |
| Jon's Farmhouse; 54.89708°N 2.77844°W | — | 1725 | The farmhouse was extended to the left in the 19th century. It is in sandstone, the walls have been raised in brick, and it has a Welsh slate roof. There are two storeys and five bays. The doorway has a plain surround and a dated and inscribed lintel. One original window remains, the others replaced by 20th-centgury windows. | II |
| Greenwell Farmhouse, barns and outbuildings 54.90041°N 2.72364°W | — | Early 18th century (probable) | A farmhouse and adjoining outbuildings, including a barn dated 1774. The farmhouse has two storeys, three bays, and a doorway and sash windows with rusticated stone surrounds. The barn to the left has plank doors, ventilation slits, and external steps leading to a loft door. The barn further to the left has a door with a keyed arch, an initialled and dated keystone, quoins, and ventilation slits. To the right of the house is a single-storey outbuilding. | II |
| Fenton Farmhouse; 54.89624°N 2.77739°W | — | 1752 | A sandstone house that has a slate roof with coped gables. There are two storeys and three bays. The doorway has a quoined surround, to the left of it is a three-light mullioned window, and to the right is a horizontally-sliding sash window. In the upper floor are two sash windows; all the windows have plain surrounds. | II |
| Graham Arms; 54.90863°N 2.73139°W | — | 1771 | Originally a public house with a cottage to the right, later converted into one house. It is in sandstone with a slate roof, and has two storeys and four bays. The former public house has a doorway and sash windows with chamfered surrounds, above the door is a dated lintel, and the upper floor windows are mullioned. The former cottage has a door with a quoined surround, and casement windows with plain surrounds. | II |
| Gelt Mill; 54.90142°N 2.72358°W | — | 1775 | A former cotton mill, incorporating earlier material, it is in sandstone with Welsh slate roofs, and consists of three joined buildings. The mill has a front of three storeys and two at the rear, and has an arched entrance with impost blocks and a keystone. There is a two-storey, one-bay lean-to extension, and a single-storey single-bay wheel house containing a mill wheel. To the left is a two-storey loading bay with a flat-arched keyed doorway and a loft door. Further to the left is a storehouse and granary with two storeys and two bays. | II |
| Croft House; 54.89031°N 2.79143°W | — | Late 18th century | A house that was extended in the 19th century, it is rendered and has a Welsh slate roof. There are two storeys and two bays, with a lower block of two storeys and three bays to the right, and a single bay extension further to the right. The doorway and the sash windows have plain surrounds. | II |
| Edmond Castle; 54.91917°N 2.78590°W | — | Late 18th century | A country house that was altered and extended in 1824–27 by Robert Smirke, and further extended in 1844–48 by Sidney Smirke, and has since been used for other purposes. It is in calciferous sandstone with some brick, it has green slate roofs, it is in two storeys, and has an approximately T-shaped plan. The original part has five bays, and the 1824–27 extension has three bays. The 1844–48 extension provided a library, a conservatory, a chapel and a study. There is a prostyle porch with octagonal columns, pointed arches, a decorated frieze, and a battlemented parapet. Other features include a three-storey octagonal angle tower, and a square three-storey turret. | II |
| Rose Cottage; 54.88551°N 2.76726°W | — | Late 18th century | A sandstone house with a slate roof, in two storeys and two bays. The doorway and the windows, which are sashes, have plain surrounds. | II |
| St Mary Magdalene's Church; 54.91149°N 2.76921°W | | 1780 | A rebuild of an earlier church, a chapel was added in 1793, the chancel was rebuilt in 1842, and the church was restored in 1888. It is in sandstone on a chamfered plinth, with quoins, a shaped cornice, and a slate roof with coped gables. The church consists of a nave with a north chapel, a chancel with a north vestry, and a west tower incorporating a porch. The tower has three stages, a doorway that has an alternate block surround with a keyed entablature, clock faces on three sides, and a battlemented parapet with pointed corner pinnacles. The windows have round heads, at the east end is a Venetian window, and in the wall is a sundial. | II* |
| Newby Bridge; 54.91458°N 2.81765°W | | Late 18th or early 19th century | The bridge carries Little Corby Road over the River Irthing. It is in sandstone and consists of a high rounded arch with two courses of voussoirs. The bridge has a humped back and a single carriageway. | II |
| Hayton School; 54.91169°N 2.76981°W | — | 1818 | The school was extended in 1853 and in 1871, and has Welsh slate roofs with coped gables. The original part is in sandstone, it is in a single storey with three bays, a porch, and a doorway and casement windows with plain surrounds. The extensions are in calciferous sandstone with sandstone quoins. There is an extension to the left at right angles that is gabled with a bellcote, and a further extension in line with the original that has two bays. The windows in the extensions are casements in moulded surrounds with impost blocks and round heads. | II |
| Hayton Vicarage; 54.91066°N 2.76854°W | — | 1821 | The vicarage is in sandstone on a chamfered plinth, and has quoins and a slate roof. There are two storeys and three bays. The doorway has engaged Doric columns, a block entablature, an open moulded triangular pediment, and a radial fanlight. The windows are sashes with plain surrounds. | II |
| Greenholme Lodge, flanking walls and bollards 54.91092°N 2.80387°W | — | c. 1824 | Originally a lodge to Edmond Castle, later a private house, it is in sandstone on a chamfered plinth, with pilastered angles, a moulded cornice, a battlemented parapet, and a roof in green and Welsh slate. It has 1 1/2 storeys, and a central pointed-arched carriageway with one bay on each side. The windows have pointed heads and moulded surrounds, and the entrances inside the carriageway have plain surrounds. Flanking the lodge are short screen walls ending in piers with caps, and there are stone bollards in front of it. | II |
| Byres, Greenholme Lodge; 54.91063°N 2.80384°W | — | 1824 (probable) | The farm buildings have outer walls of sandstone with quoins, inner walls in brick, and roofs in slate and corrugated iron. They are on three sides of a farmyard, and have 1 1/2 storeys. The buildings have plank doors and loft doors with sandstone surrounds, external steps leading to the loft, boarded windows and ventilation slits. | II |
| Outbuildings, Edmond Castle; 54.91992°N 2.78679°W | — | 1824–27 | Designed by Robert Smirke as stables, the buildings were later extended. On the garden front they are in calciferous sandstone, facing the courtyard they are in red and yellow sandstone, and they have Welsh slate roofs. The buildings have a U-shaped plan and one or two storeys, and there is a three-storey square tower. The tower has reeded quoins and dressings, lancet windows with chamfered surrounds, a clock face on the east side, a square angle turret, and a battlemented parapet. At the west end is a carriage entrance, and a tower with pigeon holes, a hipped roof, and a cupola. | II |
| Castle Hill; 54.91284°N 2.76926°W | — | Early 19th century | A sandstone farmhouse with quoins and a Welsh slate roof. There are two storeys and three bays, flanked by single-storey wings on both sides. The central doorway has a surround of chamfered quoins with a keystone. On the right side is a covered seat. | II |
| Barn, gincase and other outbuildings, Castle Hill; 54.91302°N 2.76950°W | — | Early 19th century | The barn is in rubble with an asbestos sheet roof. It has a sandstone porch, doors, windows, and ventilation slits. To the west is a sandstone gincase with a pyramidal slate roof and a central finial. It has two storeys, two bays, a variety of openings including sash windows, and contains a re-used date stone. Also included in the listing are a single-storey cart shed, pig-hulls, a brewery, and a farmyard wall. | II |
| The Stone Inn; 54.91176°N 2.77023°W | | Early 19th century | A public house in sandstone with rendered side walls, quoins, and a Welsh slate roof. It has two storeys, two bays, a doorway with a quoined surround, and sash windows with plain surrounds. | II |
| Milestone; 54.92020°N 2.77176°W | — | 1830 | The milestone was provided for the Carlisle to Brampton turnpike. It is in sandstone, it is a square with a chamfered top, and is set at an angle to the road. On the sides are cast iron plates indicating the distances in miles to Carlisle and Brampton. | II |
| Milestone; 54.91405°N 2.79422°W | — | 1830 | The milestone was provided for the Carlisle to Brampton turnpike. It is in sandstone, it is a square with a chamfered top, and is set at an angle to the road. On the sides are cast iron plates indicating the distances in miles to Carlisle and Brampton. | II |
| Milestone; 54.90524°N 2.81457°W | — | 1830 | The milestone was provided for the Carlisle to Brampton turnpike. It is in sandstone, it is a square with a chamfered top, and is set at an angle to the road. On the sides are cast iron plates indicating the distances in miles to Carlisle and Brampton. | II |
| Gelt Bridge; 54.90845°N 2.73072°W | | 1832–35 | The viaduct, which is 64 feet (20 m) high, was built by the Newcastle and Carlisle Railway to carry the railway over the River Gelt. It is in channelled and rusticated sandstone, and has voussoirs and a parapet with iron railings. The viaduct consists of three skew arches on two piers, and there are inscribed panels on the abutments. | II* |
| Cowran Bridge and cutting, and Skellion Bridge; 54.90471°N 2.74337°W | | 1836 | The structures were built by the Newcastle and Carlisle Railway. The revetment walls for the cutting are in sandstone, they extend for 725 metres (2,379 ft), and end in low pillars. Skellion Bridge is attached to the east end of the cutting and carries a bridleway. It consists of a single almost semicircular arch. Cowran Bridge, to the west of the cutting, carries a public road, and has a single shallow segmental arch. | II |
| Talkin Church; 54.90803°N 2.70406°W | | 1842 | The church is in Norman style, it is built in sandstone on a chamfered plinth, and has a slate roof with eaves modillions and coped gables. The church consists of a nave and a chancel, a south porch, and a north vestry, and on the west gable is a bellcote. The doorway is flanked by engaged Norman columns and it has a round moulded arch. The windows are round-headed lancets, there is a continuous hood mould, and the east window has three lights. | II |
| Talkin Vicarage; 54.90799°N 2.70453°W | — | Mid 19th century | The vicarage, later a private house, is in sandstone and has a Welsh slate roof with stepped coped gables. It has two storeys and an L-shaped plan, each range having two bays. It has a porch and a round-headed doorway with a radial fanlight, a hood mould, and a parapet above. The windows are sashes with shaped lintels. | II |
| Carriage house and stable, Talkin Vicarage; 54.90830°N 2.70413°W | — | Mid 19th century | The building is in sandstone with eaves modillions and a slate roof. It has a single storey and three bays. In the centre is a large round-arched entrance with a hood mould, and to the left is a smaller entrance and louvred windows. In the left wall is a recess containing a carved castle. | II |
| Toppin Castle; 54.90556°N 2.78720°W | | Mid 19th century | A farmhouse built in the form of a tower house for George Head Head, it is in sandstone with large quoins and a modillioned battlemented parapet. The building consists of a four-storey tower with a five-storey hexagonal angle stair turret, and there is a two-storey two-bay extension at the rear. The doorway has a chamfered round arch. The windows are lancets containing casements, and they have chamfered surrounds. There is a recessed panel containing a coat of arms. | II |
| Barns, Toppin Castle; 54.90562°N 2.78672°W | — | Mid 19th century | The barns are in sandstone with angle buttresses, and a Welsh slate roof with coped gables. There are two storeys, numerous bays, a projecting cart entrance with a gabled roof, plank doors with chamfered surrounds, elliptical arches, and a hood mould, and ventilation slits with chamfered surrounds. To the left are L-shaped buildings and a lean-to, some with asbestos sheet roofs. | II |
| Gate piers, Toppin Castle; 54.90544°N 2.78691°W | — | Mid 19th century | The sandstone gate piers are short and square, and have battlemented and chamfered caps. | II |
| Norman House; 54.91170°N 2.76909°W | | Late 1860s or early 1870 | The house is in mixed red sandstone and calciferous sandstone on a chamfered plinth, with quoins and a Welsh slate roof with coped gables. There are two storeys, the house is in an L-shaped plan with two bays in each range, there is a square tower in the angle, and a staircase tower. The square tower has three storeys and a stone pyramidal roof with shaped modillions, and the staircase tower has round-headed lancet windows, a decorated cornice, and battlemented parapet. In the ground floor the windows are mullioned, and elsewhere they are varied, some with Norman features. | II |
| Haybarn, Castle Hill; 54.91316°N 2.76925°W | — | Late 19th century | The haybarn is in sandstone with a Welsh slate roof, and has two storeys and five bays. In the upper floor are stone pillars with squared capitals, and in the lower floor is a carved kneeler. | II |
| Walls, railings, gates and piers, St Mary Magdalene's Church; 54.91147°N 2.76942°W | | Late 19th century (probable) | Enclosing the churchyard to the west of the church is a low sandstone wall with chamfered coping carrying cast iron railings with pointed heads. The sandstone gate piers are square with chamfered angles and cap. The gates are in wrought iron with spiked rails, and between the piers is an iron overthrow with a lamp. | II |
| War memorial 54.91160°N 2.76933°W | | 1920 | The war memorial is in the churchyard of St Mary Magdalene's Church. It is in sandstone, and consists of a wheel-head cross on a tall, bowed shaft with a sloping low base. On the cross-head and upper part of the shaft is strapwork carving, and the lower part of the shaft carries an inscription relating to the First World War. | II |
