= Little Corby =

Village in Cumbria, England

Coordinates: 54.907°N 2.817°W

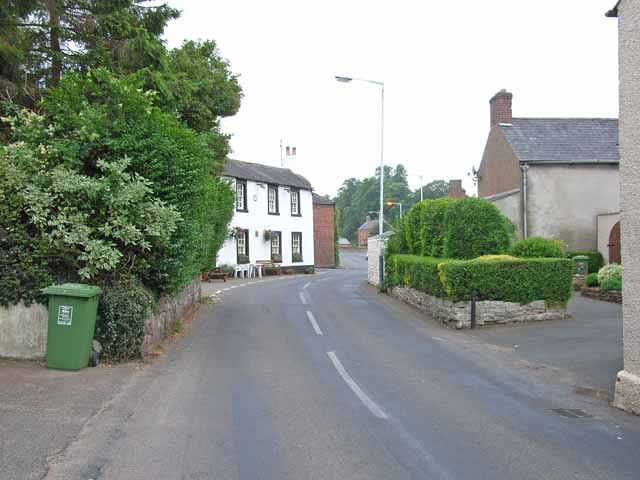
- Little Corby

- Location in the former Carlisle district, Cumbria Location within Cumbria
- OS grid reference: NY476572
- Civil parish: Hayton
- Unitary authority: Cumberland
- Ceremonial county: Cumbria
- Region: North West
- Country: England
- Sovereign state: United Kingdom
- Post town: CARLISLE
- Postcode district: CA4
- Dialling code: 01228
- Police: Cumbria
- Fire: Cumbria
- Ambulance: North West
- UK Parliament: Carlisle

Little Corby is a village in the county of Cumbria in the north of England. It is east of the city of Carlisle, alongside the River Eden and near to the A69 road. In 1870-72 the township had a population of 241.

Along with the adjoining villages of Corby Hill and Warwick Bridge, Little Corby forms part of a small built-up area which is a dormitory village for Carlisle. Corby Hill and Little Corby are in Hayton civil parish while Warwick Bridge is in the parish of Wetheral.
