= Catharine Washington =

British volunteer ambulance driver and writer

- Born: Catharine Marguerite Beauchamp Waddell; 9 January 1892; Warwick Bridge, Cumberland
- Died: 25 December 1972 (aged 80); Heads Nook, Cumberland
- Other names: Pat Waddell
- Occupations: volunteer ambulance driver and organiser
- Known for: FANY nurse decorated in WWI and WWII
- Spouse: Peter Washington
- Children: two

Catharine Washington known as Pat Waddell born Catharine Marguerite Beauchamp Waddell (9 January 1892 – 25 December 1972) was a British volunteer ambulance driver, writer and member of the First Aid Nursing Yeomanry (FANY). She lost a leg but returned in the First World War and she then served again in the Second World War. She was awarded the French Croix de Guerre, the Belgian Médaille de la reine Élisabeth and the Polish Grand Cross of Merit (military class).

== Life ==
Washington was born in 1892 with the name of Catharine Marguerite Beauchamp Waddell. She was known as "Pat". She was the last of three children born to Catharine Beatrice Beauchamp Thompson and her husband Cranston Waddell. Her father manufactured woollens and she was born at Howard Cottage at Warwick Bridge. They lived in the parish of Wetheral in north Cumberland.

She joined the First Aid Nursing Yeomanry in 1912. The yeomanry had been founded five years before with the intention of taking first aid to wounded soldiers using horses. The horses were abandoned and the volunteer nurses went to the front even though the British army was initially not interested. They had to pay a monthly subscription and supply their own uniforms. She was given veterinary, signalling, cookery and first aid lessons.

By 1916 the policy was changed and ambulances driven by women were welcomed. Lilian Franklin was in charge of the eighteen FANYs who made up the Calais Convoy. They were stationed on a hill outside Calais and they were tasked with picking up and returning with the wounded. Their ambulances consisted of converted private cars and dilapidated lorries.

In May 1917 she was driving a noisy chain-driven Willys Overland "ambulance" when it was hit by a train. The stretcher bearer was killed instantly and Washington had to have her leg replaced with an artificial limb. If she had been a man then the cost would have been covered, but she had to pay for the replacement leg. She recovered and went back to active duty in 1918. After the war in 1919 she published Fanny Goes to War using the nom de plume of Pat Beauchamp. She was awarded the French Croix de Guerre and the Belgian Médaille de la reine Élisabeth.

In 1921 she was involved in setting up a summer camp for the FANYs and they needed supplies. The War Office was uncooperative so Washington tried using the popularity of the FANYs when trying to persuade a sergeant-major at Pirbright. They got all their supplies. She left the FANY and married Peter Washington who she had met while she was recovering from losing her leg and he was also wounded. They had two children but the marriage was short.

At the start of the Second World War she was turned down for active duty because of her missing leg, but the FANY asked her to take a mobile canteen to France. She was there when the country was conquered by the German army and she was able to leave at St Malo after pushing the canteen off a cliff. She was then involved in FANY administrative duties in Edinburgh supporting the Polish Armed Forces in the West. Their uniforms were Polish and she wrote a book Eagles in Exile in support of the Poles in 1943. She was sent to America to help fund raise and this work was recognised by the head of the Polish forces, General Władysław Anders.

She returned to her home parish and she died in Heads Nook in 1972 and she was buried in the churchyard at Wetheral.
