= James Pringle Weavers =

British menswear retailer

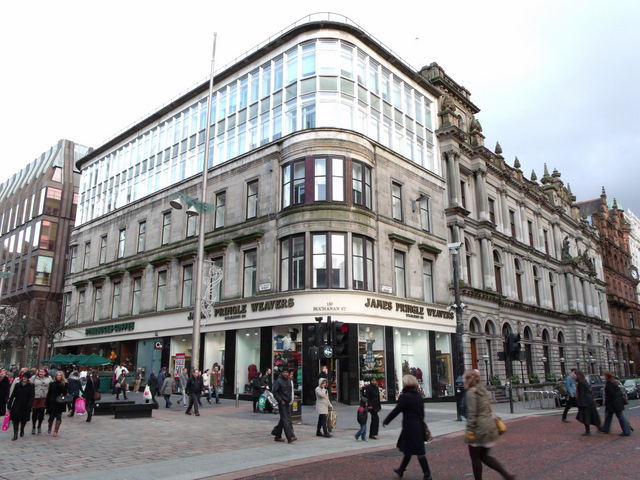
- Shop in Glasgow
- Type: Private limited company
- Industry: Retail
- Founded: 1789; 237 years ago
- Owner: The Edinburgh Woollen Mill

James Pringle Weavers is a British menswear retailer, founded in 1789. It is owned by The Edinburgh Woollen Mill, alongside Bonmarché and Peacocks.

== History ==
In 1989, the retailer was purchased by The Edinburgh Woollen Mill, when a descendent of the original Pringle family, also called James, retired. This James Pringle came up with the idea of opening a mill shop to sell tweed and tartan to the general public.

In January 2021, the retailer was rescued from administration, alongside The Edinburgh Woollen Mill. In March 2022, the retailer installed a system in one of its locations to assist visitors with dementia. In April 2023, the retailer returned to Glasgow.

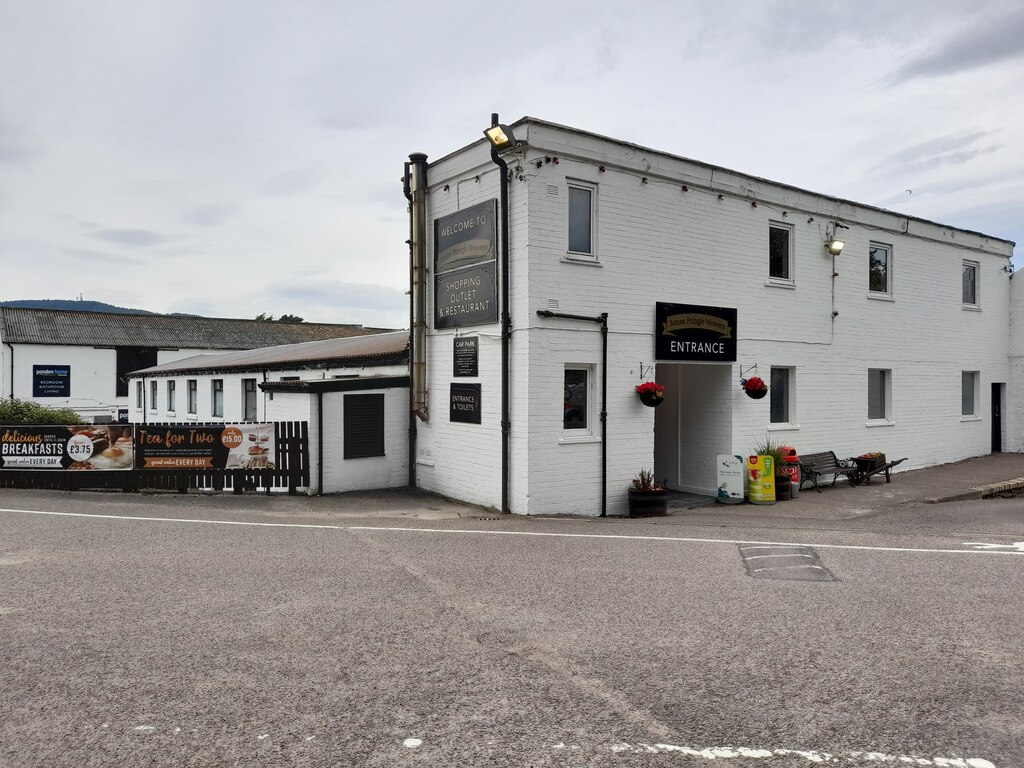
Shop at Holm Mills, near Inverness

It was reported in July 2024 that the chain's location at Holm Mills near Inverness acts as a tourist attraction, attracting around 150,000 visitors per year.
