= Faugh =

Faugh is an exclamation indicating disgust. It can also refer to:

== Derived from the Irish word Fág ==
- Faugh A Ballagh, a battle cry of Irish origin
- Faughs GAA Club, a Gaelic sports club in Dublin, Ireland
- Castleblayney Faughs GFC, a Gaelic sports club in County Monaghan, Ireland
- Faugh-a-Ballagh, a 19th-century Irish racehorse

== Other ==
- Faugh, Cumbria, a village in the City of Carlisle District in England
