= Edmond Castle =

Country house in Cumbria, England

Coordinates: 54.9191°N 2.7860°W

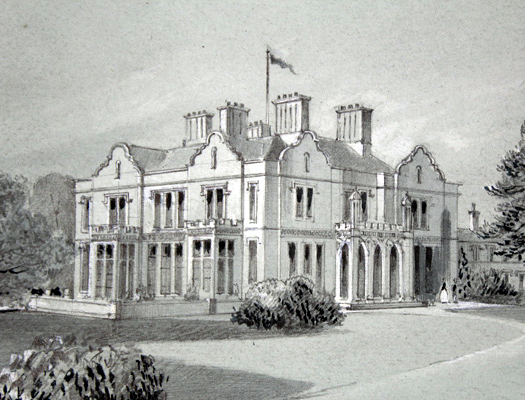
Edmond Castle, c. 1840–50. Drawing by Charles Greenwood or Frederick Peake.

Edmond Castle is a nineteenth-century structure north of the village of Hayton, Carlisle, Cumbria in England. The history of Edmond Castle is intertwined with the Graham family.

It is now home to Philip Day, CEO and owner of the Edinburgh Woollen Mill retail chain.

== History ==
Edmond Castle was enlarged and remodelled between 1824 and 1829 for Thomas Graham, to designs by Sir Robert Smirke, and between 1844 and 1846 was further enlarged to designs by Sydney Smirke.

In 1937, T. H. B. Graham died, and his son Eric Graham inherited. In the late 1930s, Eric Graham sold Edmond Castle and the entire estate to Henry Studholme Cartmell and Stanley Walton, and it was used to house Czech refugees from about June 1940 onwards.

Edmond Castle was later a borstal for delinquent boys, and later a hotel, before being bought by property developer David Dyke in 2005.

== See also ==
- Listed buildings in Hayton, Carlisle
