= The Union (Victoria) =

Historic homestead in Victoria, Australia

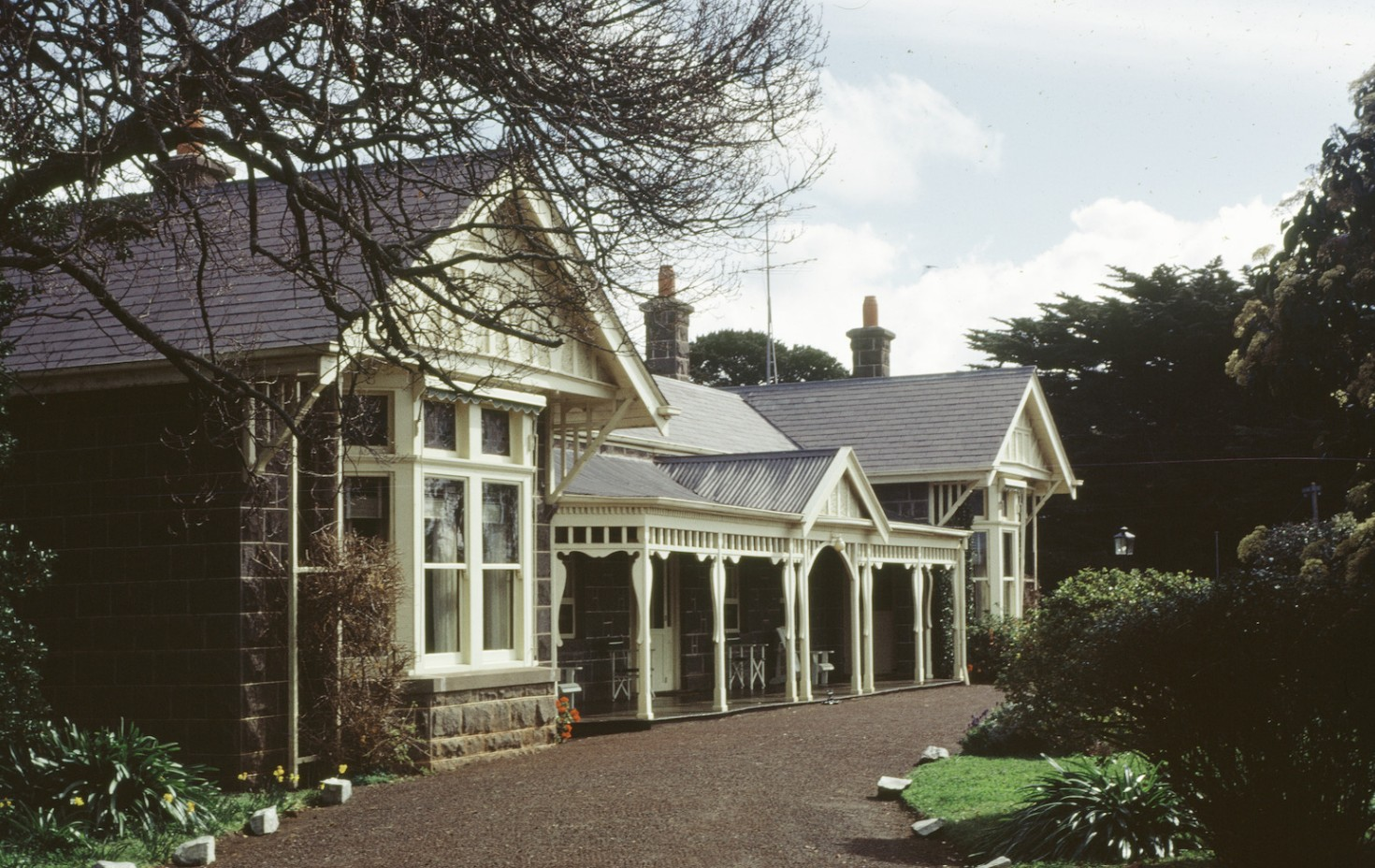
- The Union Homestead

- Location in Moyne Shire, Victoria
- 38°10′59″S 142°28′06″E
- Type: Homestead, associated built facilities and grounds
- Location: Woolsthorpe, Victoria, Australia
- Nearest city: Warrnambool

History
- Built: 1857
- Built for: William Lindsay

The Union is a historic pastoral property in Woolsthorpe, Victoria, Australia. The property originated as part of a pastoral lease taken up by James Carmichael in 1843 and was subsequently owned by the Lindsay family for more than 70 years. Its nineteenth-century bluestone homestead, built during the 1850s, survives with an extensive established garden, together with stone stables more than a century old. The property later became associated with Gwen and Edna Jones, who owned and operated The Union for 60 years and were prominent in the local community.

== History ==
=== Lindsay ownership ===
The Union formed part of a pastoral lease taken up by James Carmichael in 1843. It was subsequently acquired by the Lindsay family, who retained the property for more than 70 years. William Lindsay operated the station before it passed to his son, also named William, who managed The Union in conjunction with his brother James' nearby property, Quamby. At one point the two brothers collectively ran approximately 40,000 sheep. The Lindsay family also used the station as a social venue, hosting visiting English cricket teams for informal matches. The great English cricketer W. G. Grace was reportedly among those who played at The Union.

William Lindsay, the station owner, died in August 1898, leaving an estate valued at £61,947 18s 1d, including £55,848 in real property and £6,099 18s 1d in personal property. After legacies to his three daughters, his estate was divided equally between his sons James and William.

A substantial bluestone homestead was established at The Union during the 1850s. The surviving house has a slate roof and slender-posted verandahs and is set within an extensive established garden. The property also retains stone stables dating from the nineteenth century. The homestead contained eight large rooms, together with a kitchen, scullery, storeroom, pantries, bathroom and staff quarters, and was supplied with sewerage and electric lighting.

Following the death of William Lindsay in 1934, the estate of The Union was valued at £125,466, comprising £32,895 in real property and £92,571 in personal property. His estate was principally left to the children of Agnes Cameron and the children of his late brother James Lindsay, with additional bequests made to two sisters-in-law and Thomas Richardson.

The Union was offered for public auction at the Warrnambool Coorporation yards on 13 February 1935. The sale attracted unusually large interest, with prospective purchasers travelling from the Riverina, Geelong, Ballarat, Castlemaine, Clunes, Hamilton, Macarthur and surrounding districts. Bidding began at £6 10s per acre and rose to £7 1s per acre, at which price the property was purchased by Robert J. Jones of nearby Maes-y-Porth. The successful sale was notable because The Union had been held by the Lindsay family since its original selection.

=== Jones ownership ===
Jones purchased the approximately 5,000-acre (2,023 ha) property on behalf of his two daughters, Gwen and Edna Jones, who were aged 26 and 24 respectively. Gwen received approximately 1,995 acre (807 ha), including the homestead and associated improvements, while Edna received approximately 3,070 acres (1,242 ha) north of Ballangeich Road, which divided the sisters' portions. Their holdings included the homestead and station buildings, tanks, pumps, windmills, pipes, wool press and electric-light plant. Robert Jones subsequently moved into the homestead with his daughters and paid off the mortgage three years before it was due.

The Jones sisters became closely involved in the social and community life of the surrounding district. Known locally as the Misses Jones, Gwen and Edna undertook much of the domestic work at The Union themselves, including cooking, cleaning and tending the vegetable garden, despite the property's extensive staff quarters. They joined the Country Women's Association, the local Presbyterian church, the Country Fire Authority and the Red Cross, and supported numerous local causes. The Union hosted sheepdog trials, the Woolsthorpe sports day, church picnics, gymkhanas, fundraising events for Open Garden and Rotary, and fox hunts. The sisters refused to poison bait to eradicate foxes because they had committed to hosting the annual hunt, despite the foxes regularly killing their chickens.

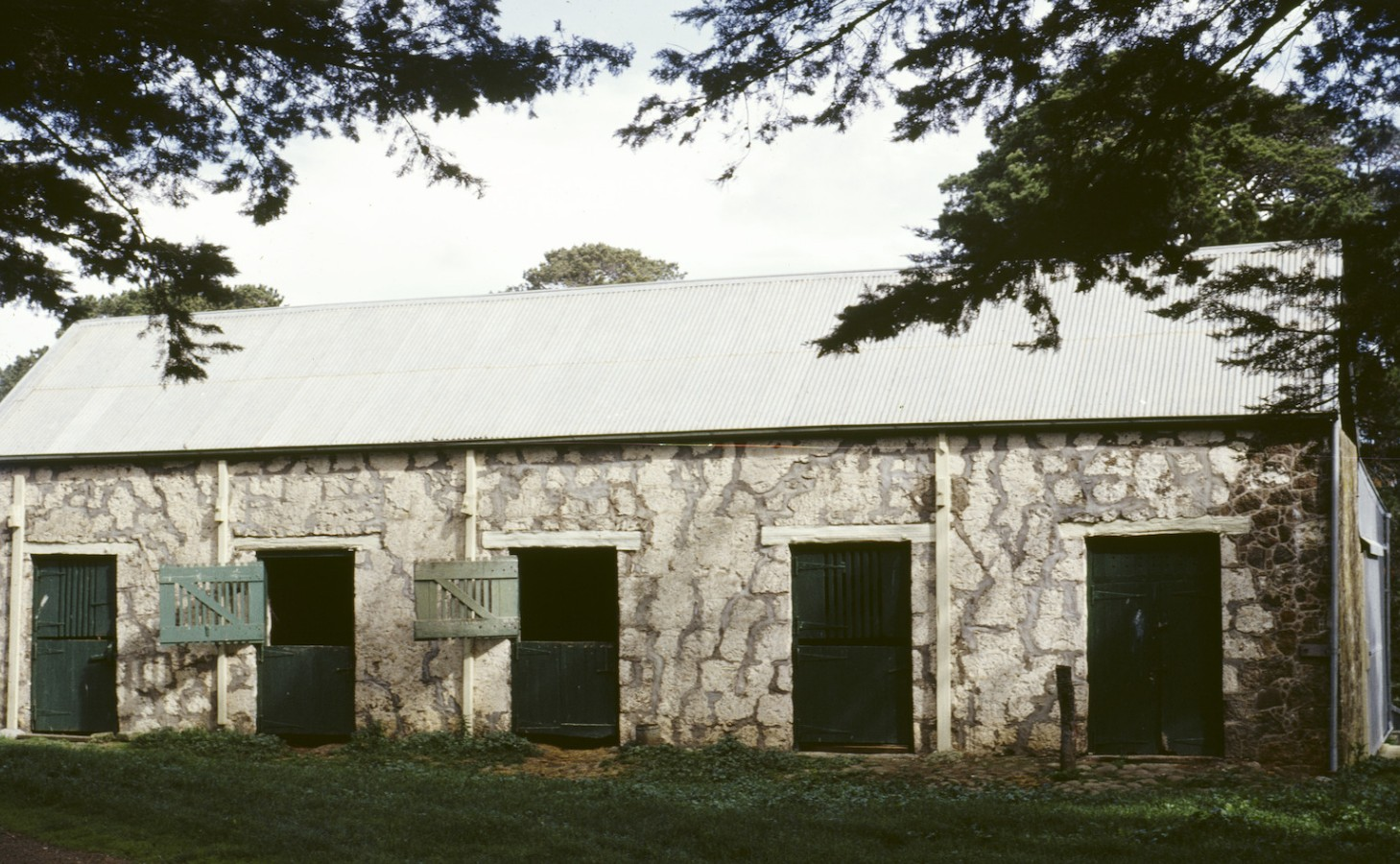
The stables

Robert Jones lived at The Union with his daughters until his death in 1944 from complications arising from bronchitis. He had reportedly been concerned that potential suitors might be attracted to his daughters because of their wealth, and is said to have actively discouraged them. On his deathbed, he asked Gwen to care for Edna and ensure that The Union continued to be properly managed. Neither sister subsequently married.

The sisters' prosperity was aided by a period of high wool prices. In 1952, eight years after their father's death, Gwen and Edna travelled to Britain aboard the SS Orontes, making stops including Adelaide, Fremantle, Colombo, Aden, Naples, Marseille and Gibraltar. They remained overseas for nearly two years and attended the coronation of Queen Elizabeth II, the royal enclosure at Ascot and a garden party at Buckingham Palace. They also visited livestock sales and sheepdog trials in Scotland and the James Pringle Woollen Mills. During the return journey via South Africa, Gwen reportedly brought approximately 4,000 feet (1,200 m) of film documenting the trip.

In 1955, the sisters decided to replace the station's sheep flock with Hereford cattle after determining that this was the most effective way of addressing footrot at The Union. Bulls were purchased from the studs Coora, Killuc, Boonarah, Ardno and Emmadale. Corriedale sheep were subsequently reintroduced to the property. In the same year, the sisters were informed that the government intended to acquire a substantial portion of their land for the Soldier Settlement Scheme. They successfully negotiated for the government to take their land at Maes-y-Porth instead, leaving The Union intact.

Dairying subsequently became an important part of the property. By 1969, approximately 420 acres (170 ha) at The Union were devoted to dairy production and 130 cows were being milked. In 1979, the sisters purchased a rotary dairy for $23,600. The facility attracted considerable local interest, with bus excursions organised to allow visitors to see the new installation. By 2000, The Union carried approximately 550 Hereford breeders, 550 Friesian dairy cows and 8,500 Corriedale sheep.

Edna Jones died in 1995, aged 85, six decades after her father had purchased The Union. Gwen died five years later in 2000, aged 91. The sisters established the Gwen and Edna Jones Foundation to support the community with which they had been closely involved. Following the sale of The Union in 2001, proceeds from the property were added to the foundation, which had subsequently distributed more than $7.5 million in charitable grants.

=== McKenna ownership ===
The Union was purchased in 2001 by Colin and Janice McKenna, who spent the following seven years renovating and extending the historic homestead. Colin McKenna, who owns Midfield Meats in Warrnambool, subsequently expanded the property through the acquisition of neighbouring paddocks. The Union had grown to approximately 11,000 acres (4,451 ha) and was carrying around 1,500 Friesian cows and 600 Angus and Hereford breeders, producing approximately 3,500 calves annually.

== See also ==
- Devon Park
- Minjah
