= Allenwood, Cumbria =

Hamlet in England

Coordinates: 54.894°N 2.797°W

Allenwood
- Hamlet
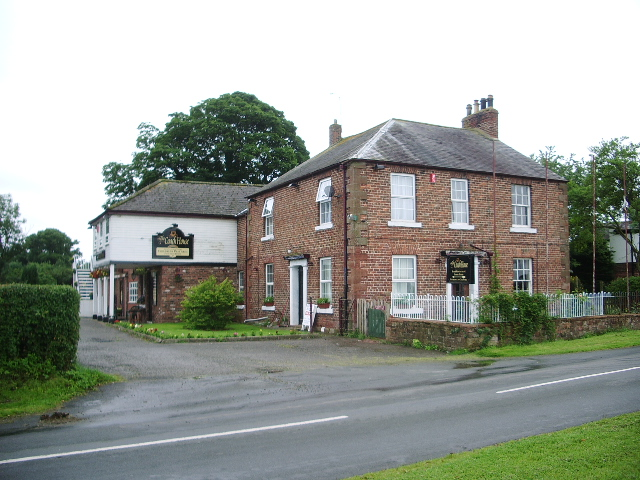
- The Coach House, Allenwood

- Location in the former Carlisle district Location within Cumbria
- OS grid reference: NY489558
- Civil parish: Wetheral
- Unitary authority: Cumberland
- Ceremonial county: Cumbria
- Region: North West
- Country: England
- Sovereign state: United Kingdom
- Post town: BRAMPTON
- Postcode district: CA8
- Dialling code: 01228
- Police: Cumbria
- Fire: Cumbria
- Ambulance: North West
- UK Parliament: Carlisle

Allenwood is a hamlet in Cumbria, England.

== Nearby settlements ==
Nearby settlements include the villages of Warwick Bridge and Heads Nook.
