= Ponden Home =

British homewares retailer

- Company type: Private limited company
- Industry: Retail
- Founded: 1976; 50 years ago (as Ponden Mill)
- Owner: The Edinburgh Woollen Mill
- Website: www.pondenhome.co.uk

Ponden Home is a British homewares retailer, founded in 1976 as Ponden Mill. It is owned by The Edinburgh Woollen Mill, alongside Bonmarché and Peacocks.

== History ==
In January 2008, The Edinburgh Woollen Mill purchased Ponden Mill, and in November of that year purchased 77 stores from the administrators of Rosebys, renaming the chain Ponden Home with 150 locations.

In November 2020, The Edinburgh Woollen Mill and Ponden Home went into administration.

In January 2021, The Edinburgh Woollen Mill and Ponden Home were rescued by an investor consortium. As part of the agreement, 34 Ponden Home stores were closed.

In July 2024, it was reported that Ponden Home's parent company had returned to profitability.
