= Heads Nook railway station =

Disused railway station in Cumbria on the Tyne Valley Line

Heads Nook
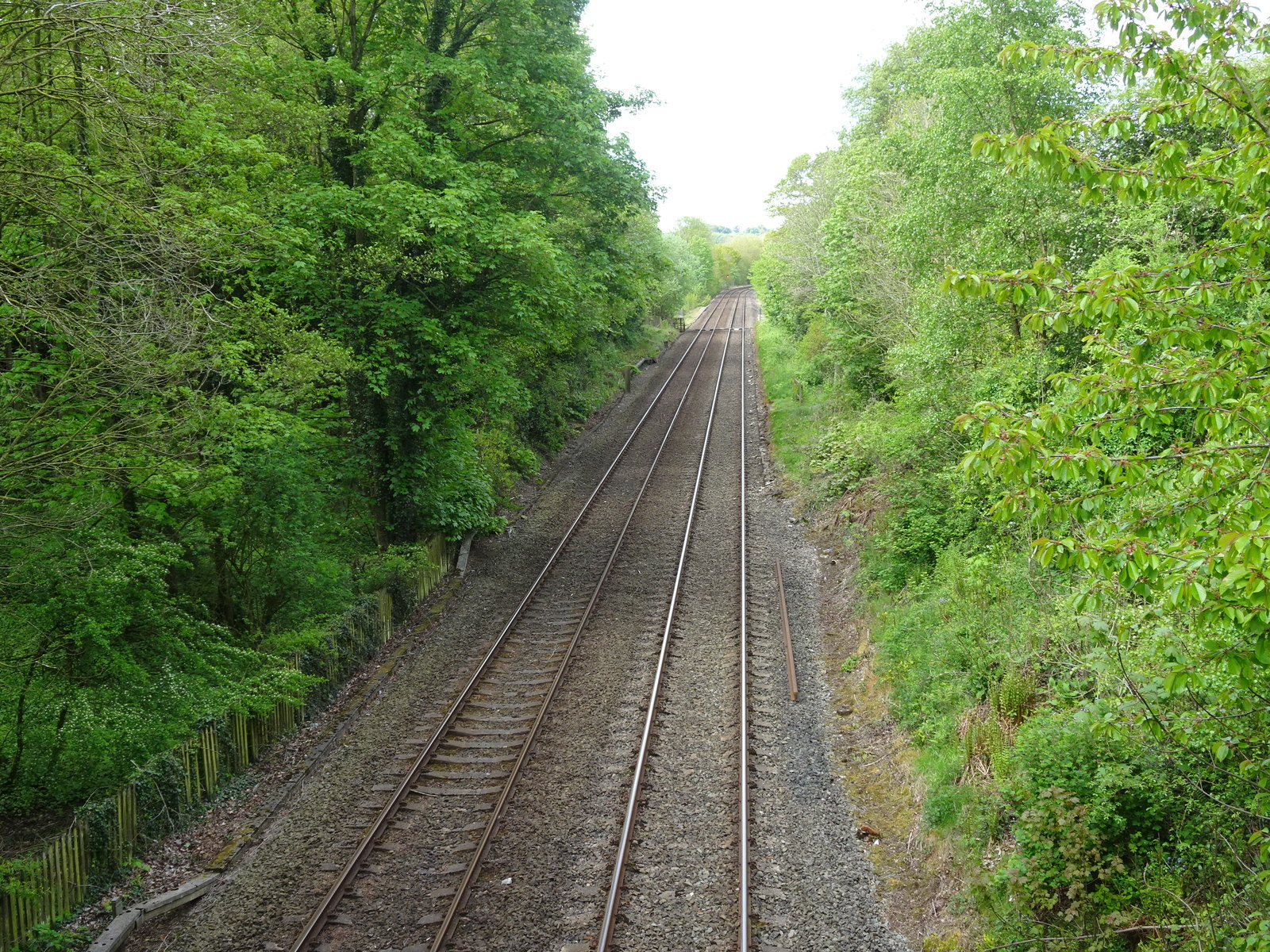

General information
- Location: Heads Nook, Cumberland; England
- Coordinates: 54°53′20″N 2°47′26″W
- Platforms: 2
- Tracks: 2

Other information
- Status: Disused

History
- Original company: Newcastle and Carlisle Railway
- Pre-grouping: North Eastern Railway
- Post-grouping: London and North Eastern Railway; British Rail (Eastern Region)

Key dates
- 1 July 1862: Opened
- 2 January 1967: Closed
Location

Heads Nook railway station served the village of Heads Nook, south-west of Brampton, Cumbria, England. The station was on the Newcastle and Carlisle Railway. It was closed in 1967 as part of the Beeching cuts. After which the station was left derelict until 1975 when it was demolished by British Rail.

Flanked by railway police at midnight, B.R. workmen set to work on the demotion as 30 residents watched in disbelief. There had been a campaign to have it reopened as an unstaffed halt. Consequently this move was seen as very underhand by campaigners. When interviewed by a newspaper reporter at the time, Mr Bernard Widdowson, chairman of Heads Nook Villagers Association at the time, said they were angry because the demolition work had come at a time when their negotiations with British Rail and Cumbria County Council were at a peak. A British Rail spokesman said the demolition was necessary for safety reasons with the platform. If it was to be reopened, temporary wooden structures could be used. B.R. also said that the demolition work needed to be conducted at night, as that was the only time there were no trains using the line.

The station lamps were sold off. Two of them can be seen in the village, one not far away from the station just over the railway bridge.

Not much of the station can be seen anymore as nature has reclaimed the platforms for its own. Today they look like nothing more than leafy green banks in the railway cutting, which the casual observer would pass by without any further thought.

| Preceding station | Historical railways | Following station |
|---|---|---|
| How Mill | North Eastern Railway; Newcastle and Carlisle Railway | Wetheral |
