= Romanes & Paterson =

Coordinates: 55.95245°N 3.19513°W

- Type: Private limited company
- Industry: Retail
- Founded: 1810; 216 years ago
- Founder: James Romanes
- Headquarters: Langholm, Dumfriesshire
- Owner: The Edinburgh Woollen Mill

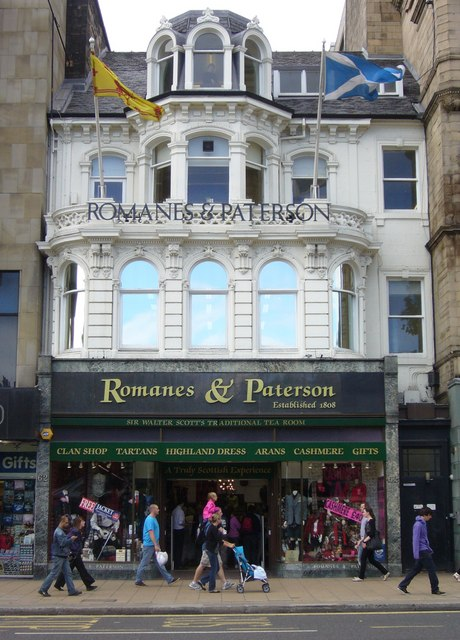
Romanes & Paterson, Princes Street

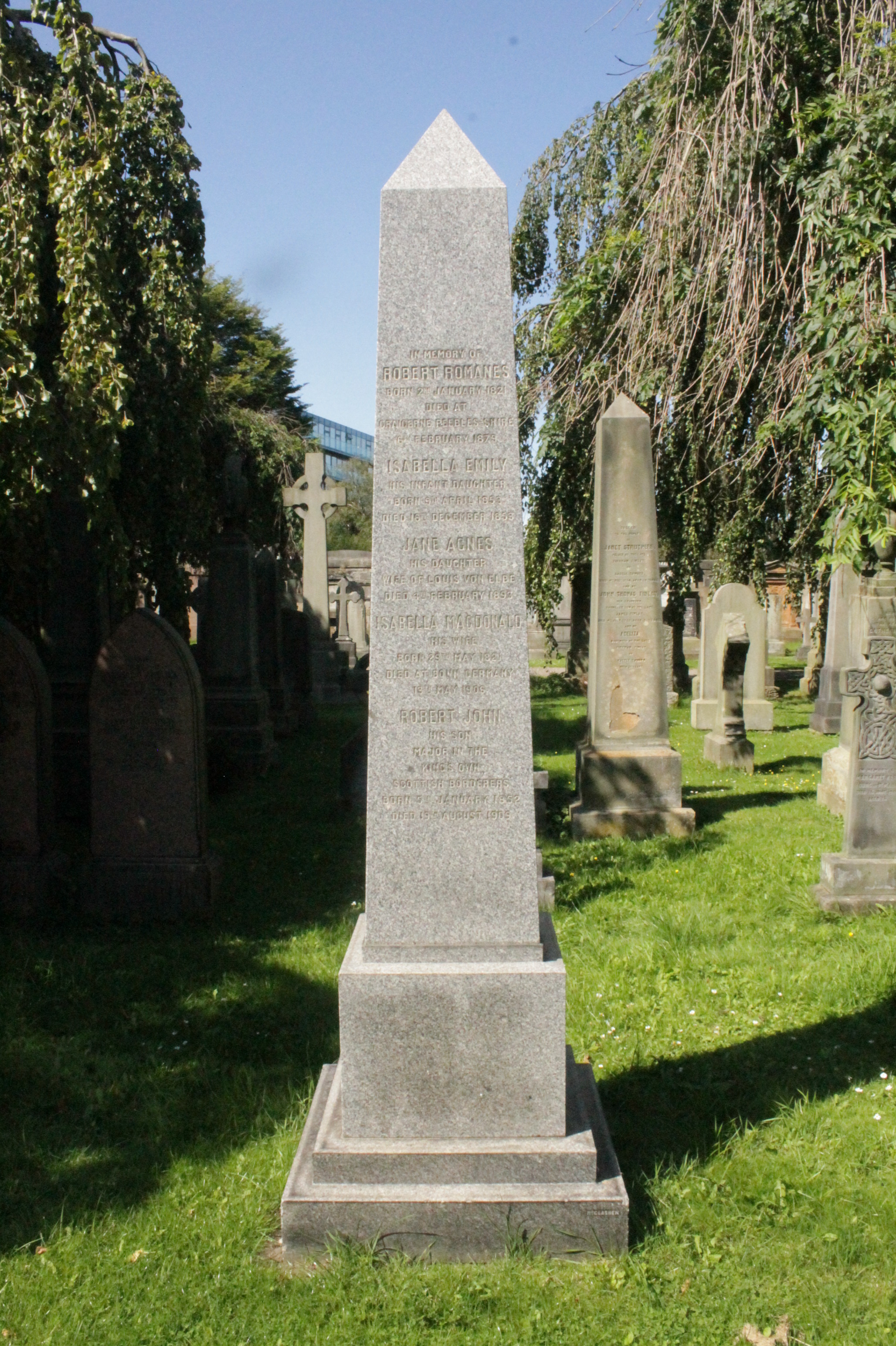
The grave of Robert Romanes, Dean Cemetery

Romanes and Paterson is a traditional 19th century shop on Princes Street in Edinburgh. It is owned by The Edinburgh Woollen Mill. In 2020, due to the COVID-19 pandemic, Edinburgh Woollen Mill went into administration.

== History ==
The unusual family name of Romanes seems to have earlier been spelled as Romains, a merchant family of longstanding in Edinburgh. In 1810 James Romanes is listed as a "merchant" on the north side of Drummond Street in Edinburgh's South Side. In 1815 he moved to larger and more prominent premises at 88 South Bridge.

Romanes and Paterson began as "silk mercers" at 37 South Bridge in 1816. They soon moved to 49 North Bridge. Both properties are in Edinburgh's Old Town.For various reasons the shop moved from specialising in silk to specialising in both silk and tartan.

The Paterson of Romanes and Paterson does not appear as an independent householder until 1835, when "James Paterson of Romanes & Paterson" is living in a flat at 6 India Street. This places him as a son or younger brother of the silk mercer Richard Mercer who had a shop at 8 Hunter Square and lived at 3 East Register Street. The proximity of this to Romanes shop (less than 100m) can only mean the firms were rivals, and for some reason James Paterson chose to join Romanes rather than his only family's firm.

In 1839 they presented a book of tartans to a local museum. In 1842, on Queen Victoria's first visit to Edinburgh, the firm becomes by appointment to the Queen.

Paterson must be considered the junior partner, not only from his being second named, but also due to his lack of advancement. In 1850 he is still living in a flat at India Street, whereas Robert Romanes had moved out of the city by this time.

Not until 1884 did the firm move from North Bridge to 62 Princes Street (their current home). This building originally dates from around 1780 but was remodelled in 1870 by Robert Reid Raeburn - giving it its current "gingerbread house" appearance. The original Romanes and Paterson shop disappeared in the 1890s.

Both silk and tartan went out of fashion around 1910 and the shop broadened its products in the 20th century, but now would mainly be seen as a "tourist shop", albeit a quality one. Their tearoom however remains a destination for locals wishing a traditional treat.

== Robert Romanes ==
Robert was born the son of James romanes at 2 Buccleuch Place in south Edinburgh on 2 January 1821.

In the 1860s he had a villa ("Kingsmuir") in Peebles an hour south of Edinburgh. Here, Robert Louis Stevenson was a frequent visitor to his house in his capacity as best friend of his son, Robert "Bob" John Romanes (1852-1909) (later Major Romanes of the KOSB).

He died at his country estate of Craigerne in Peeblesshire on 6 February 1879. He is buried in Dean Cemetery in west Edinburgh. The grave is marked by an obelisk which stands on the north side of the main east west path, between the central monument to the 79th Highlanders and the pyramid on "Lords Row".

== Family ==
He was married to Isabella MacDonald (1821-1906).
