= Heads Nook =

Village in Cumbria, England

Coordinates: 54.888°N 2.789°W

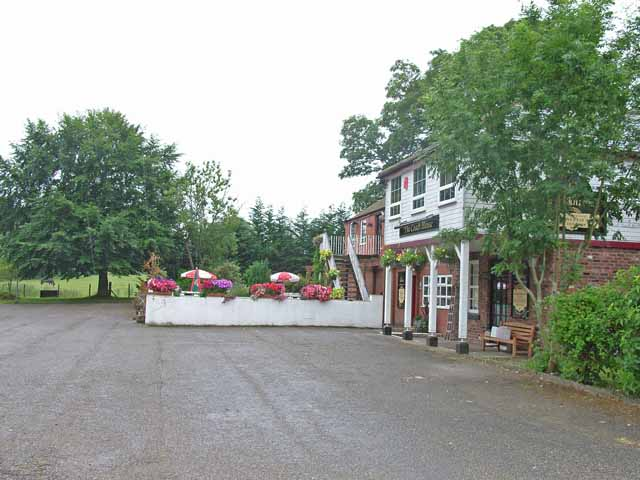
- The Coach House public house, Heads Nook

- Location in the former Carlisle district, Cumbria Location within Cumbria
- OS grid reference: NY493551
- Civil parish: Hayton; Wetheral
- Unitary authority: Cumberland
- Ceremonial county: Cumbria
- Region: North West
- Country: England
- Sovereign state: United Kingdom
- Post town: BRAMPTON
- Postcode district: CA8
- Dialling code: 01228
- Police: Cumbria
- Fire: Cumbria
- Ambulance: North West
- UK Parliament: Carlisle

Heads Nook is a village in the civil parishes of Hayton and Wetheral, in the Cumberland district, in the ceremonial county of Cumbria, England. Until 1967, it was served by Heads Nook railway station.

== Nearby settlements ==
Nearby settlements include the city of Carlisle, the town of Brampton, the villages of Warwick Bridge and Fenton and the hamlets of Broadwath and Allenwood.
