= Woolsthorpe, Victoria =

Woolsthorpe
- Town
- Coordinates: 38°12′S 142°26′E
- Country: Australia
- State: Victoria
- LGA: Shire of Moyne
- Location: 25 km (16 mi) N of Warrnambool; 31 km (19 mi) S of Caramut; 13 km (8.1 mi) E of Hawkesdale

Population
  - Total: 422 (2016 census)
- Postcode: 3276

Woolsthorpe (/wʊlsˈθɔːrp/) is a small town in the Shire of Moyne, Victoria, Australia. It is situated at the intersection of the Woolsthorpe-Heywood, Koroit-Woolsthorpe, and Warrnambool-Caramut Roads, on the banks of Spring Creek. There is a local pub, the National Hotel. At the 2016 census, Woolsthorpe had a population of 422, down from 694 in 2006. The nearest large town is Warrnambool 26.5 kilometres further south.

British colonisation of the vicinity began in May 1841 when Robert Whitehead, an English squatter, established a sheep station which he named Spring Creek. Whitehead's overseer reported that there were a large number of Aboriginal huts on the banks of the creek when they first arrived and that they had driven the Aborigines away with gunfire. Conflict over the occupation of the land continued for the next couple of years with flocks of sheep being taken, shepherds speared and Aboriginal people shot. In 1842, Whitehead with two of his employees and several other settlers, shot dead four Aboriginal woman and a child in a gully in what became known as the Lubra Creek massacre. Whitehead temporarily fled the colony to escape punishment but he soon returned and continued to hold the Spring Creek property (which he renamed Goodwood) until his death in 1879.

The Goodwood property of 24,000 acres was subdivided to allow for closer settlement, which included the creation of the towns of Woolsthorpe and Hawkesdale, with Woolsthorpe being gazetted in 1852. The Woolsthorpe Post Office opened on 6 August 1861.

The local agriculture is primarily based on sheep and cattle.

== Traditional ownership ==
The formally recognised traditional owners for the area in which Woolsthorpe sits are groups within the Eastern Maar peoples, who are represented by the Eastern Maar Aboriginal Corporation (EMAC).

== See also ==
- The Union
