= How Mill railway station =

Disused railway station in Cumbria on the Tyne Valley Line

How Mill
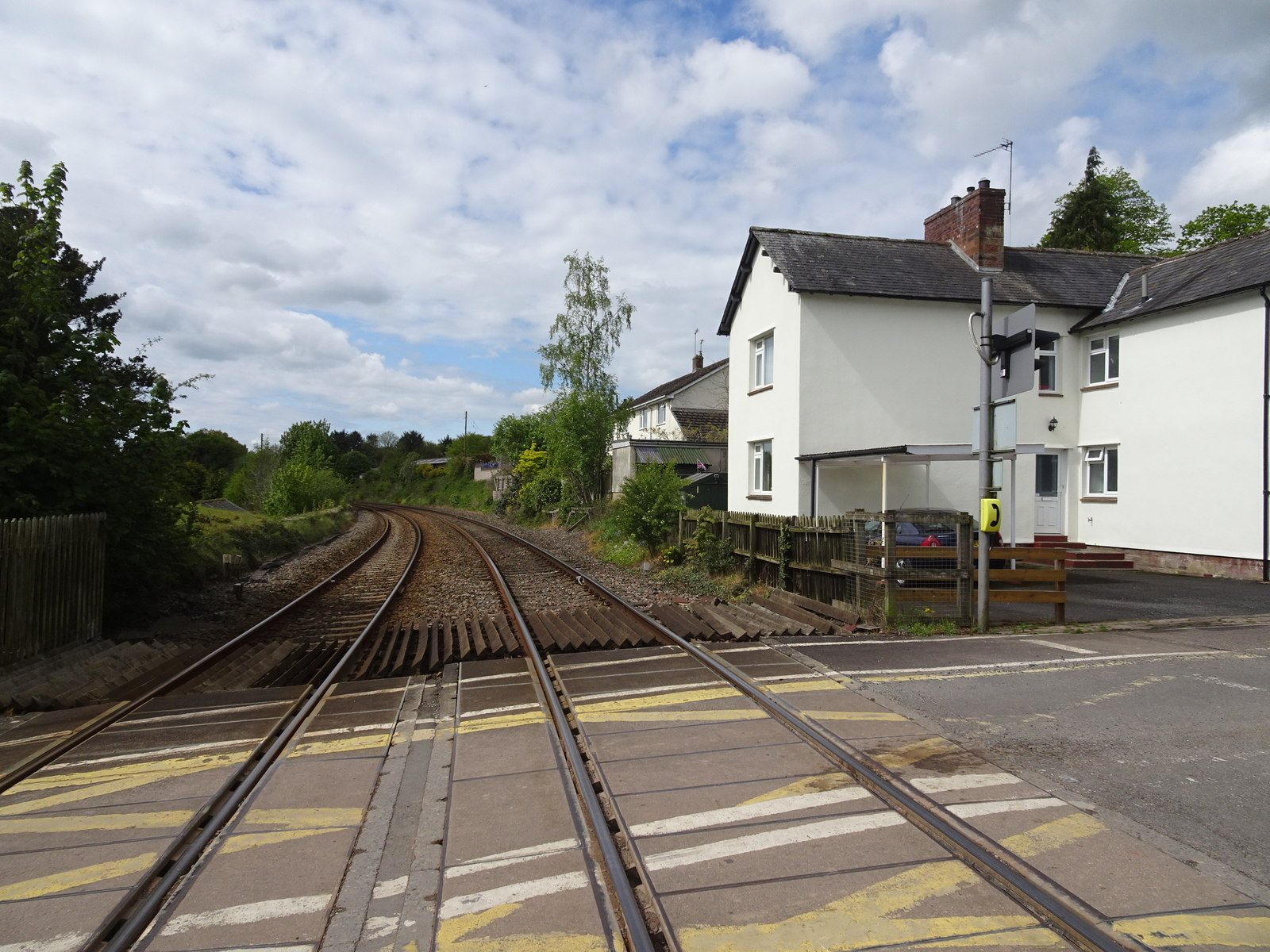

General information
- Location: How Mill, Cumberland; England
- Coordinates: 54°54′05″N 2°45′55″W
- Grid reference: NY510565
- Platforms: 2
- Tracks: 2

Other information
- Status: Disused

History
- Original company: Newcastle and Carlisle Railway
- Pre-grouping: North Eastern Railway
- Post-grouping: London and North Eastern Railway; British Rail (Eastern Region)

Key dates
- 19 July 1836: Opened
- 5 January 1959: Closed
Location

How Mill was a railway station which served the village of The How, near Brampton in Cumbria. The station was closed on 5 January 1959, four years before the Beeching Axe.

The How was on one side of the station, almost a mile away, while the Mill was on the other side. The Mill was a sawmill and a house where the family lived who own the Mill. A level crossing was in place in the early 1940s.

Preceding station	Historical railways	Following station
Brampton (Cumbria)	North Eastern Railway; Newcastle and Carlisle Railway	Heads Nook
