= Talkin Tarn =

Kettle lake in Cumbria, England

Coordinates: 54.922°N 2.710°W

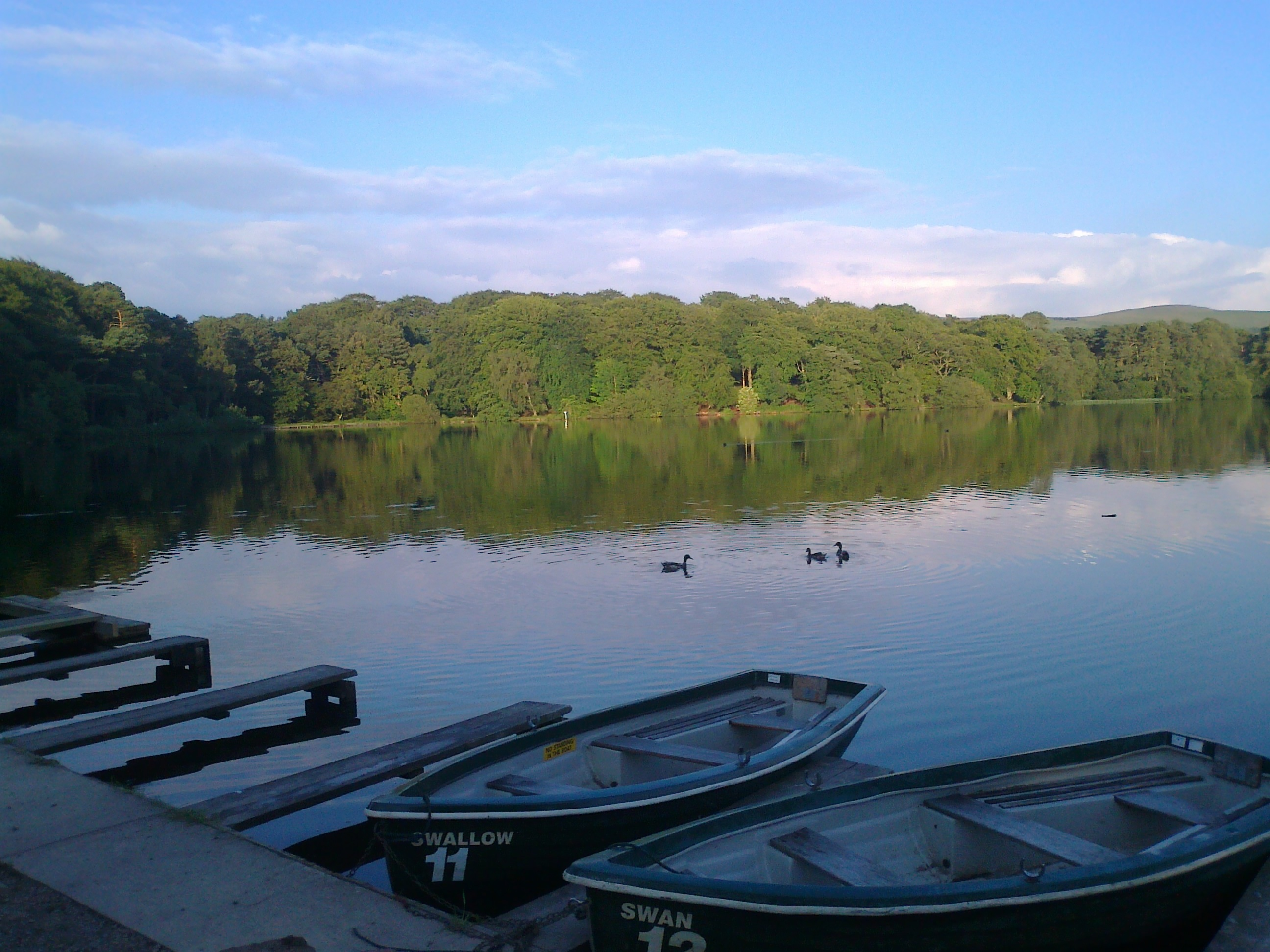
The Pleasure Boats at Talkin Tarn

Talkin Tarn is a glacial lake and country park near Brampton, Cumbria, England. The lake is in a kettle hole, formed 10,000 years ago by mass glacial action. Situated just 20 minutes from Carlisle by road, or a short train journey via Brampton Junction, this is a popular venue for families and local people.

Talkin Tarn Country Park is owned and maintained by Cumberland Council. It is home to the Boat House Tea Rooms, Brampton Sailing Club, and Talkin Tarn Amateur Rowing Club. The profits from the Tea Rooms and the pay and display car parking are reinvested in the upkeep and improvement of the site.

Rowing is an activity at Talkin Tarn. The rowing club, Talkin Tarn Amateur Rowing Club, celebrated its 150th anniversary in 2009. Rowing races were first held on Talkin Tarn in the 1850s, and the Rowing Club was formed in 1859 by local townsfolk, several descendants of whom still live in the area. It is the oldest rowing club in the North of England, with the exception of Tyne Rowing Club, and is the 14th oldest non-university club in the country. Talkin Tarn Annual Regatta has grown considerably in recent years from a total entry of 20 in 1946 and 97 in 1988 to what it is today – very successful and one of the largest one-day regattas outside of London with total entries now in excess of 400.

Research on climate change carried out at Talkin Tarn was published in 2004.

Old buckles, stone axes, and urns have been found in the area.

== Toponymy ==
The name is of Brittonic origin. The Brittonic dialect known as Cumbric was formerly spoken in the area. According to A. M. Armstrong, et al., the first element, tal, means "brow" or "end" in Brittonic and modern Welsh, Cornish, and Breton. The second element is unclear. It may come from the Brittonic word which appears in Welsh and Old Cornish as can ("white") and Breton as kann ("bland, brilliant"). Talkin may be a hill-name meaning "white brow". 'Tarn' is derived from Old Norse 'tjǫrn' and then Middle English 'terne' meaning 'small mountain pool' or 'small lake'.

== See also ==
- Hadrian's Wall
- Stanegate
- Talkin
