= Talkin =

Village in Cumbria, England

Coordinates: 54.909°N 2.704°W

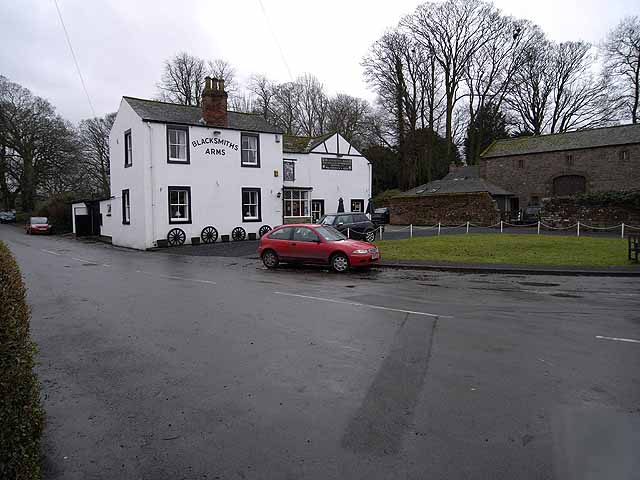
- The Blacksmith's Arms public house, Talkin

- Location in the former Carlisle district, Cumbria Location within Cumbria
- OS grid reference: NY548573
- Civil parish: Hayton
- Unitary authority: Cumberland
- Ceremonial county: Cumbria
- Region: North West
- Country: England
- Sovereign state: United Kingdom
- Post town: BRAMPTON
- Postcode district: CA8
- Dialling code: 016977
- Police: Cumbria
- Fire: Cumbria
- Ambulance: North West
- UK Parliament: Carlisle

Talkin is a village in Cumbria, England, close to Talkin Tarn.

== Toponymy ==
The name is of Brittonic origin. The Brittonic dialect known as Cumbric was formerly spoken in the area. According to A. M. Armstrong, et al., the first element, tal, means "brow" or "end" in Brittonic and modern Welsh, Cornish, and Breton. The second element is unclear. It may come from the Brittonic word which appears in Welsh and Old Cornish as can ("white") and Breton as kann ("bland, brilliant"). Talkin may be a hill-name meaning "white brow".

== See also ==
- Listed buildings in Hayton, Carlisle
