= Jane Norman =

United Kingdom-based women's clothing retailer

- Trade name: Jane Norman
- Type: Brand
- Traded as: Private
- Industry: Fashion
- Founded: 1952
- Founder: Norman Freed
- Defunct: 2018
- Products: Clothing, bags and accessories
- Owner: The Edinburgh Woollen Mill (trademarks)

Jane Norman was a United Kingdom-based women's clothing retailer, owned by Edinburgh Woollen Mill. It was the sister company of fashion chain Peacocks, owned by The Edinburgh Woollen Mill.

== History ==
The company was founded by Norman Freed in 1952, a descendant of the Compton family of Ellesmere Port, who sold it to Graphite Capital in January 2003 for £70 million.

On 30 July 2005, the company was purchased by Baugur Group for £117.3 million. In January 2007, Jane Norman reported a 45% rise in profits over 2006, and released plans to open one hundred more stores around the country, despite having already almost doubled their number from the year before, to 116.

The company went into administration on 27 June 2011. On 28 June 2011, in a pre pack deal, the brand and thirty three stores were sold to Edinburgh Woollen Mill. The company went into administration again on 26 June 2014. It was purchased out of administration by The Edinburgh Woollen Mill, which then operated the brand as an in store concession and online retailer.

In May 2018, The Edinburgh Woollen Mill announced that the brand was set to close down.
