= Corby Hill =

Village in Cumbria, England

Coordinates: 54.905091°N 2.812032°W

- Village
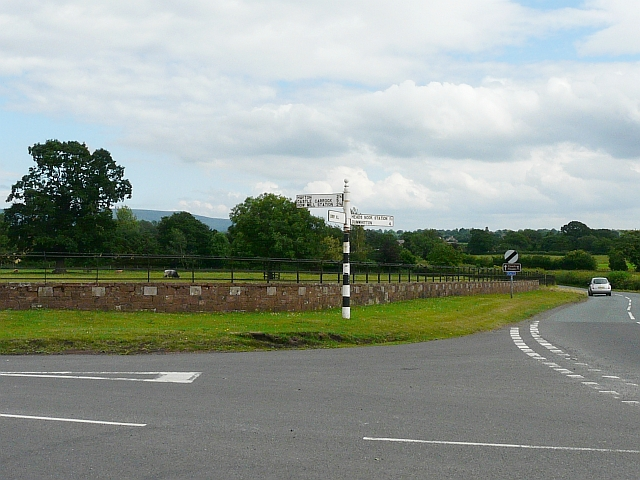
- Road junction at Corby Hill

- Location in the former Carlisle district, Cumbria Location within Cumbria
- OS grid reference: NY479570
- Civil parish: Hayton
- Unitary authority: Cumberland
- Ceremonial county: Cumbria
- Region: North West
- Country: England
- Sovereign state: United Kingdom
- Post town: CARLISLE
- Postcode district: CA4
- Dialling code: 01228
- Police: Cumbria
- Fire: Cumbria
- Ambulance: North West
- UK Parliament: Carlisle

Corby Hill is a village in Cumbria, England. It is located 5.4 miles (8.7 km) by road east of the city centre of Carlisle. The Trout Beck stream passes here.

The village forms part of a small urban area which also includes the villages of Warwick Bridge and Little Corby. Corby Hill and Little Corby are in Hayton civil parish while Warwick Bridge is in the parish of Wetheral.

== See also ==
- List of places in Cumbria
