= Rosebys =

Defunct British retail chain

- Company type: Private
- Industry: Retail
- Founded: 1922
- Defunct: 2008
- Fate: Placed into administration
- Headquarters: United Kingdom
- Number of locations: 300 stores
- Products: Soft furnishing
- Owner: GHCL Limited
- Website: www.rosebys.co.uk

Rosebys was a British retail chain, consisting of over 300 soft-furnishing stores across the United Kingdom.

Rosebys sold bedding, curtains, bathroom textiles, and other products. In September 2008 it was announced that Rosebys had become a victim of the recession caused by the 2008 financial crisis and had been placed into administration.

As of 2024, the defunct brand is still owned by Indian manufacturing company, GHCL Limited, who bought the chain in June 2006.

== History ==
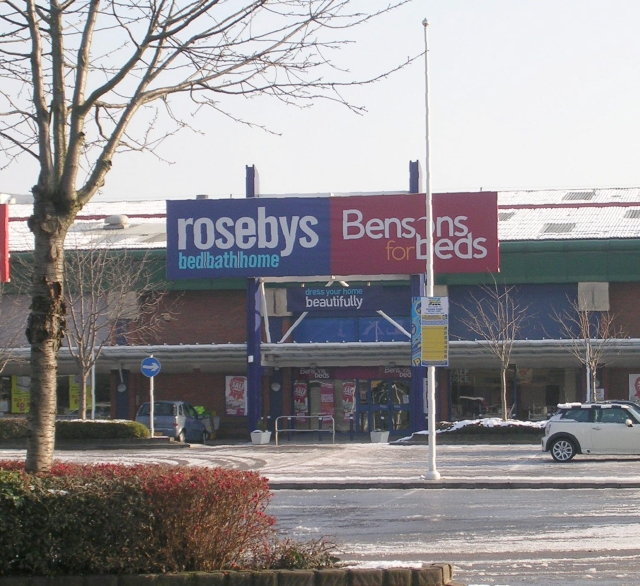
A Rosebys at Crown Point retail park in Leeds.

Rosebys was founded in Grimsby in 1922 and, following this, expanded into Yorkshire and northeast England. They acquired a number of other companies in the 1980s, including Sherrys, Stapleton Linens, Maytime Linens, and Waldmans, and became a publicly traded company in 1992. They acquired Brentfords, Knightingales, Shallets, Russells and Bond Street Fabrics in 1995, Rexmore in 1996, and Bensons Beds, The Fabric Warehouse. and Fads/Homestyle in 2000. Following this, the company changed its name to Homestyle Group.

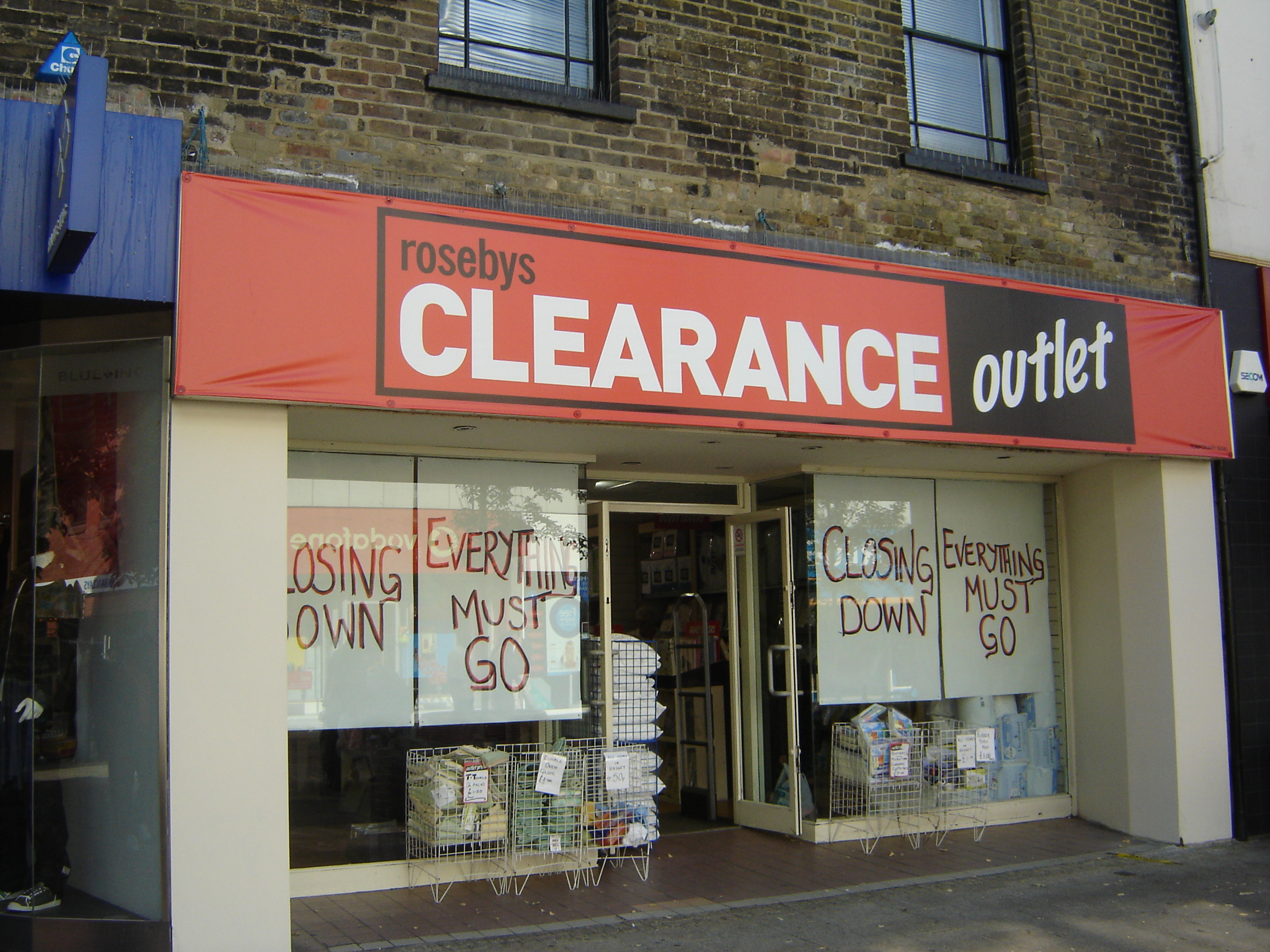
A Rosebys' store the day after the group was placed in administration.

Homestyle Group bought the Harveys chain in 2000. Knightingales stores were rebranded as Rosebys in 2002. In 2004, Rosebys and Fabric Warehouse were acquired by Lloyds Development Capital and split into two separate companies. In 2006, Rosebys was acquired by Gujarat Heavy Chemicals Ltd., part of the India-based Dalmia Group.

== Closure ==
On Friday 26 September 2008, with quarterly rents being due on the following Monday, it was announced that Rosebys had been placed into administration, with the loss of 2,000 jobs. Despite an annual turnover of £100m, the group had become a victim of reduced high street spending with fears that it would be the first of such high street failures.

In November 2008, Edinburgh Woollen Mill bought 77 stores from the administrators and merged them with the assets of furnishings business Ponden Mill to create the 150-strong Ponden Home chain.
