= Warwick Bridge =

Village in Cumbria, England

Coordinates: 54.903°N 2.819°W

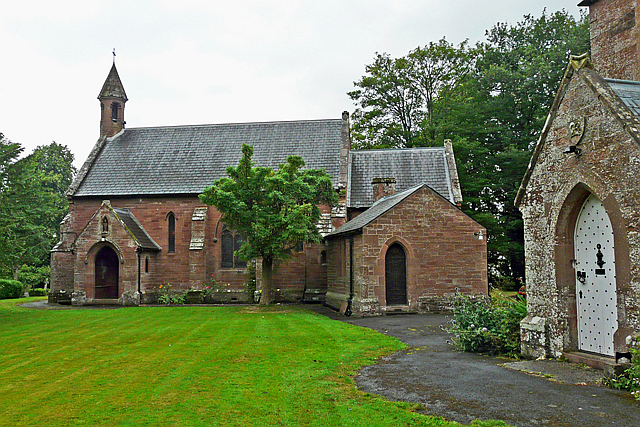
- St. Mary's and St. Wilfrid's Church, Warwick Bridge

- Location within Cumbria
- Population: 1,264 (Census 2011)
- OS grid reference: NY474567
- Civil parish: Wetheral
- Unitary authority: Cumberland
- Ceremonial county: Cumbria
- Region: North West
- Country: England
- Sovereign state: United Kingdom
- Post town: CARLISLE
- Postcode district: CA4
- Dialling code: 01228
- Police: Cumbria
- Fire: Cumbria
- Ambulance: North West
- UK Parliament: Carlisle

Warwick Bridge is a village in the Cumberland district of the ceremonial county of Cumbria, England. It forms part of a small urban area which includes the villages of Corby Hill and Little Corby. In 2011 it had a population of 1264.

Warwick Bridge lies within the civil parish of Wetheral though Corby Hill and Little Corby are in Hayton parish. Until 1974 it was in the county of Cumberland. From 1974 to 2023 it was in Carlisle district.

Warwick Bridge is located on the River Eden and the A69 road, near the River Irthing. It is five miles east of the city of Carlisle and four miles from the town of Brampton. The bridge on the Eden, which gave the village its name, was built from 1833 to 1835 by Francis Giles.

The village has a post office in Corby Hill, a Co-operative Food store and 2 churches, one being Our Lady & St Wilfrid's Church and the other St Paul's Holme Eden. There are two large mansion houses near or in the village, Warwick Hall and Holme Eden Hall built in 1837.

== People ==
Ambulance driver and nurse Pat Waddell was born here in 1892. She returned to the front after losing a leg in WW1.

== See also ==
- Listed buildings in Wetheral
