= King Water =

River in north Cumbria, England

Coordinates: 54°57′N 2°44′W

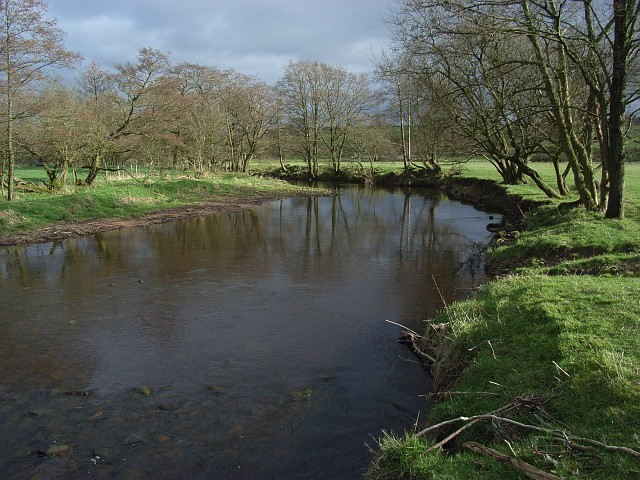
King Water upstream from the ford at West Hall.

King Water is a river in the north of Cumbria, England. The Brampton Angling Association has a long term let from the Earl of Carlisle for fishing rights on a portion of the River Irthing and part of the King Water. Hadrian's Wall crossed the King Water to the east of the village of Walton
