= Faugh, Cumbria =

Village in Cumbria, England

Coordinates: 54.887°N 2.768°W

Faugh
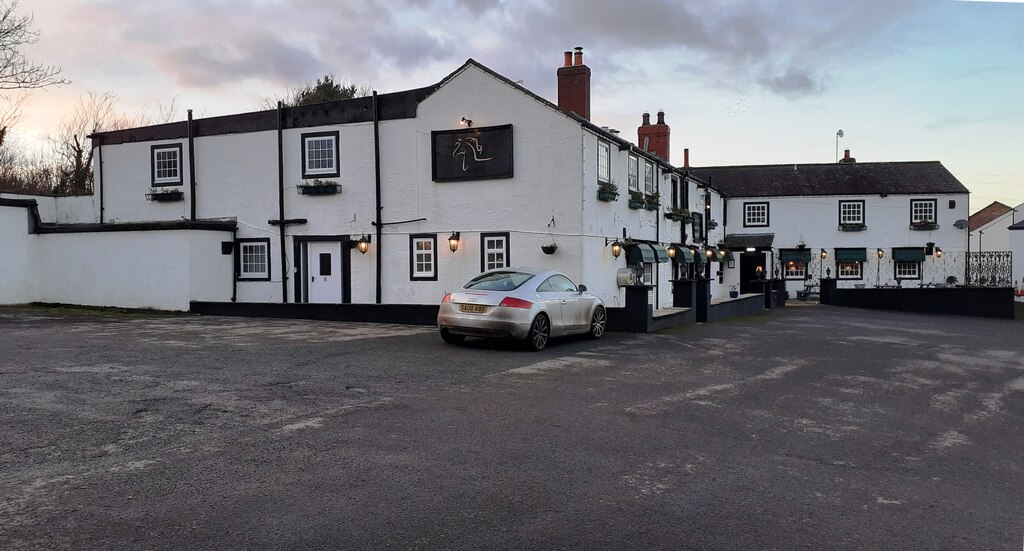
- The String of Horses Inn

- Location in the former Carlisle district, Cumbria Location within Cumbria
- Population: 80
- OS grid reference: NY507549
- Civil parish: Hayton
- Unitary authority: Cumberland
- Ceremonial county: Cumbria
- Region: North West
- Country: England
- Sovereign state: United Kingdom
- Post town: BRAMPTON
- Postcode district: CA8
- Dialling code: 01228
- Police: Cumbria
- Fire: Cumbria
- Ambulance: North West
- UK Parliament: Carlisle

Faugh is a hamlet in the civil parish of Hayton, in the Cumberland district, in the ceremonial county of Cumbria, England. Until 1974 it was in Cumberland. It is situated to the east of the city of Carlisle and within 15 minutes of the Scottish Border. The village has always been English however the land of Cumberland was once Scottish with The String of Horses Inn pre-dating the Jacobites rising (1660).
