= Edinburgh Woollen Mill =

Scottish retailer specialising in clothing

Purepay Retail Limited
- Type: Private limited company
- Industry: Retail
- Founded: 1946; 80 years ago
- Founder: Drew Stevenson
- Headquarters: Carlisle, England,
- Brands: Austin Reed; Gleneagles; Hector Russell; Jane Norman; Portree Knitwear
- Owner: Ideal Enviro Holdings Limited
- Subsidiaries: Bonmarché; James Pringle Weavers; Ponden Home; Romanes & Paterson
- Website: www.ewm.co.uk

Purepay Retail Limited, trading as The Edinburgh Woollen Mill, is a British clothing retailer founded in 1946 by Drew Stevenson. It is headquartered in Carlisle, England.

In November 2002, Philip Day led a management buy-out of the retailer. The Edinburgh Woollen Mill acquired Ponden Mill (later Ponden Homes) in January 2008, Peacocks in February 2012, and Bonmarché in April 2019. The retailer also owned Jane Norman, before closing it in May 2018. In April 2021, Peacocks was moved to a separate sister company.

== History ==
In 1946, The Edinburgh Woollen Mill was founded by Drew Stevenson as the Langholm Dyeing and Finishing Company Limited, dyeing wool yarn to order. His eldest son, David Stevenson, opened the first retail store in Randolph Place, Edinburgh, in 1970. In 1972, the first English store was opened in Carlisle.

Having been owned by several equity holdings over the previous decade the company was bought out by the newly formed EWM Group and was then subject to a secondary, management takeover in 2002, led by the current chief executive, Phillip Day.

The company's core Edinburgh Woollen Mill stores have traditionally targeted men and women over the age of 40.

In 2011, the group bought Jane Norman out of administration, having bought Ponden Mills, and merged it with 80 stores bought from the collapsed Rosebys home furnishings store to create Ponden Home.

On 22 February 2012, it was announced that EWM had purchased the Peacocks clothing retail brand along with 388 stores and concessions, its headquarters and logistics functions. Although over 200 stores were not acquired at this time, the chain has embarked on a programme of expansion since.

In 2016 EWM purchased the Austin Reed brand, the British fashion retailer founded in 1900,

The group also own James Pringle Weavers.

As of 2016, the retailer owned 88 tourist shops and visitor centres trading under various fascias (e.g. James Pringle Weavers) and 27 destination sites combining all the Group's concepts (e.g. Masson Mill).

EWM placed Jane Norman into administration in June 2014, but retained the brand and stock to sell as an online-only business.

In May 2017, it was understood that EWM had bought the Jaeger brand and debt (but not the main company, or payments to its suppliers) from its former owner, Better Capital.

In May 2017, EWM opened the first Days (department store), in what had been the BHS premises in Guildhall Square, Carmarthen, which will house Peacocks, Edinburgh Woollen Mill, Ponden Home, Jane Norman, and Austin Reed brands. This was intended to be the first of a chain of Days department stores.

In May 2020, Bangladesh Garment Manufacturers and Exporters Association in a letter to Philip Day had warned that they would blacklist EWM for non-payment of suppliers in Bangladesh and not returning their calls. The COVID-19 pandemic resulted in orders being cancelled or retailers asking for heavy discounts which led to workers going without pay or being dismissed.

In October 2020, EWM, which at that time had 24,000 employees, announced it planned to restructure.

In November 2020, Edinburgh Woollen Mill was placed into administration.

In January 2021, it was announced that Marks & Spencer had acquired the Jaeger fashion brand but not Jaeger's 63 shops and 13 concessions, for £5 million.

In January 2021, it was announced that Edinburgh Woollen Mill, Ponden Homes and Bonmarché had been bought out of administration by an international consortium of investors who injected fresh funds into the business (led by the existing management team).

In April 2021, it was announced that Peacocks had been brought out of administration by a senior executive backed by an international consortium of investors, removing it from The Edinburgh Woollen Mill to a sister company. The Edinburgh Woollen Mill Group's chief operating officer Steve Simpson took over the business, as CEO.
