= Austin Reed (retailer) =

British fashion retailer

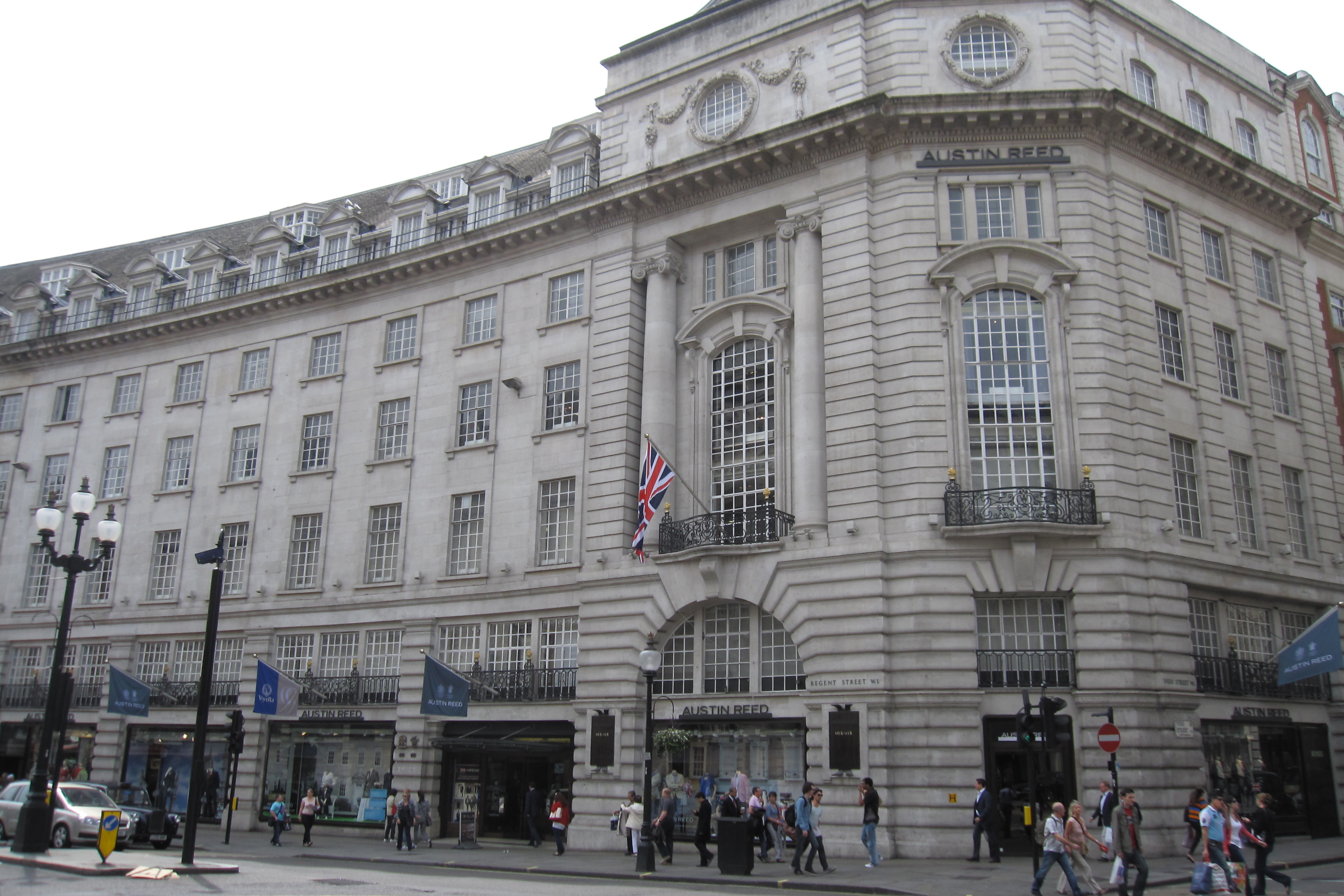
- Flagship store on Regent Street, 2011
- Trade name: Austin Reed
- Traded as: Private
- Industry: Fashion
- Founded: 1900
- Founder: Austin Leonard Reed
- Defunct: 2016
- Products: Clothing, bags and accessories
- Owner: Edinburgh Woollen Mill (trademarks)

Austin Reed was a British fashion retailer founded in 1900; the brand was acquired by Edinburgh Woollen Mill in 2016.

NKVD officer Vladimir Pravdin wore an Austin Reed suit he purchased from the Regent Street store, abandoning it in a Swiss hotel as he fled after his 1937 assassination of Ignace Reiss.

== History ==
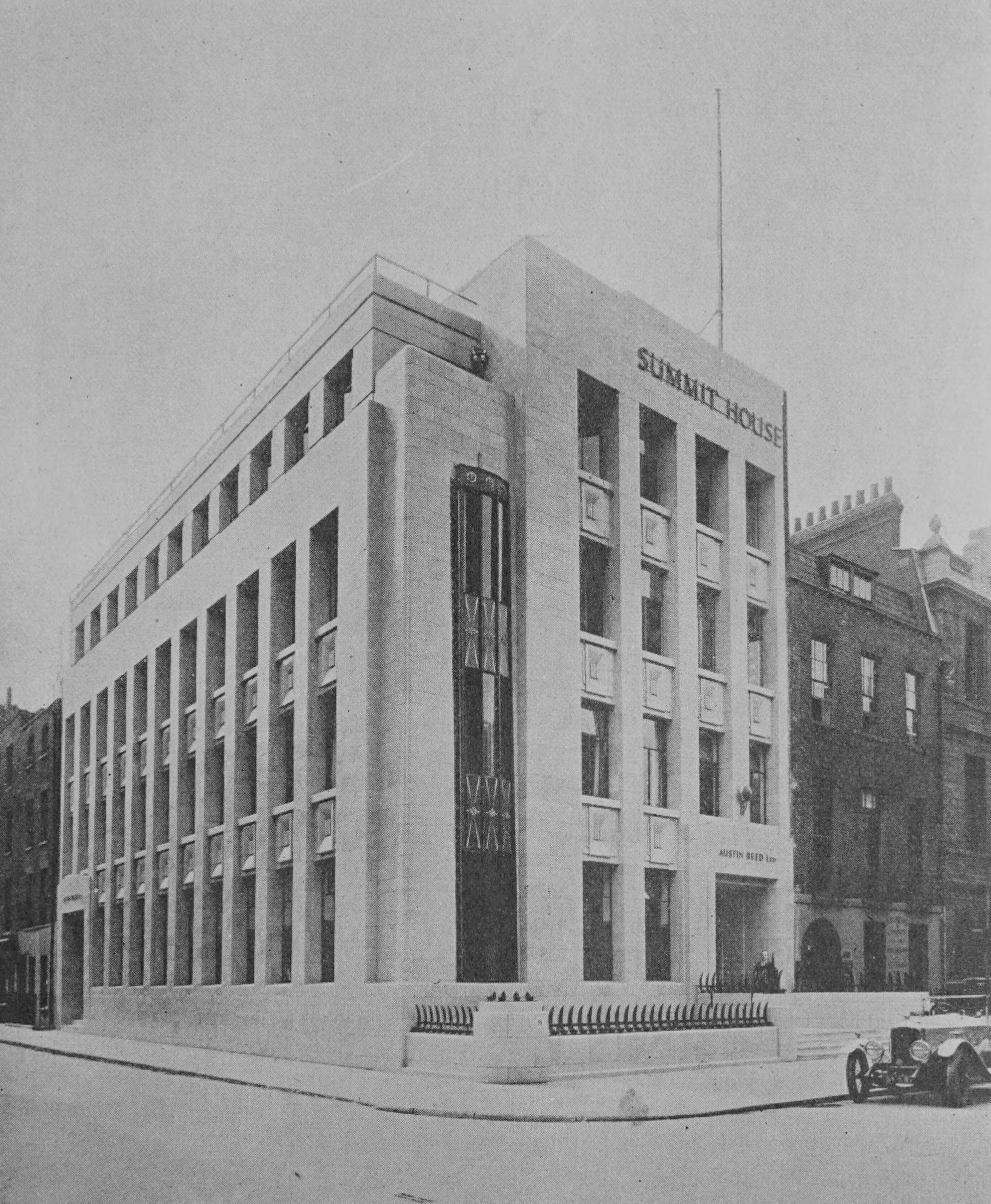
Summit House, the company's 1925 headquarters at 12 Red Lion Square, designed by P. Westwood & Emberton

Austin Reed was founded by tailor Austin Leonard Reed (1873–1954).

=== Timeline ===
- 1900 - First shop opened in Fenchurch Street
- 1911 - Opening of flagship store in Regent Street
- 1929 - First international outlet on the RMS Aquitania
- 1930 - Opening of Regent Street Barber Shop
- 1936 - Opening of a concession on the RMS Queen Mary
- 1946 - Opening of a concession on the RMS Queen Elizabeth
- 1940s - Winston Churchill was a customer
- 1980s - Launch of Austin Reed's womenswear
- 2000 - UK Manufacturing ended and Crewe factory closed
- 2005 - Kosugi-Sangyo was the Austin Reed ready-to-wear license holder in Japan
- 2009 - Austin Reed Group acquired Viyella brand
- 2011 - Move from 103-113 Regent Street to 100 Regent Street
- 2016 - Entered administration. Five concessions located in Boundary Mills outlet villages were retained by Edinburgh Woollen Mill.

Austin Reed purchased retailer Country Casuals, rebranding it CC.

== In popular culture ==
Austin Reed is mentioned as potential alternative employment by Captain Peacock on the British situation comedy, Are You Being Served. Cast member John Inman had worked at Austin Reed as a tie clerk in the early 1950s.
