= Bonmarché =

Clothing retailer based in Wakefield, West Yorkshire

- Logo used since 2015

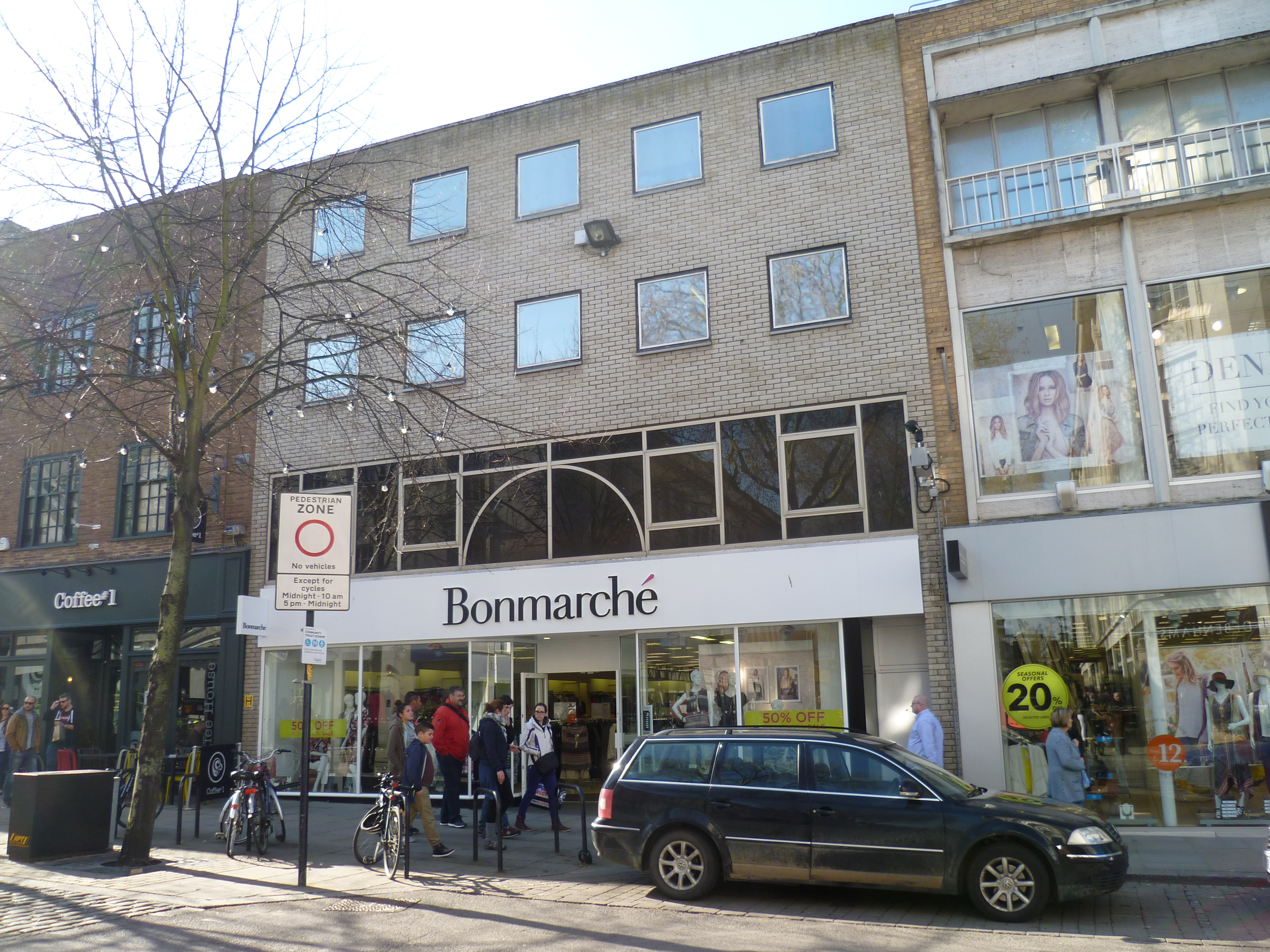
- Bonmarché store in Gloucester in April 2016
- Trade name: Bonmarché
- Company type: Subsidiary
- Industry: Fashion
- Founded: (1982; 44 years ago) in Wakefield, England
- Founder: Singh Chima
- Headquarters: Wakefield, England
- Area served: United Kingdom
- Key people: Phillip Day
- Products: Casual wear; Formal Wear; Outerwear; Swimwear; Lingerie; Accessories
- Owner: The Edinburgh Woollen Mill
- Website: www.bonmarche.co.uk

Bonmarché (/bɒnmɑːrˈʃeɪ/ bon-mar-SHAY) is a British clothing retailer founded by Singh Chima in 1982. Since April 2019, the retailer has been owned by The Edinburgh Woollen Mill.

The clothing retailer had over 380 stores nationwide, employed over 4,000 people and was the United Kingdom's largest budget fashion retailer selling womenswear in a wide range of sizes – especially clothing proportioned specifically for larger sized individuals. Ranges included casual and formal separates, outerwear, swimwear, lingerie nightwear and accessories, all designed for larger women.

== History ==
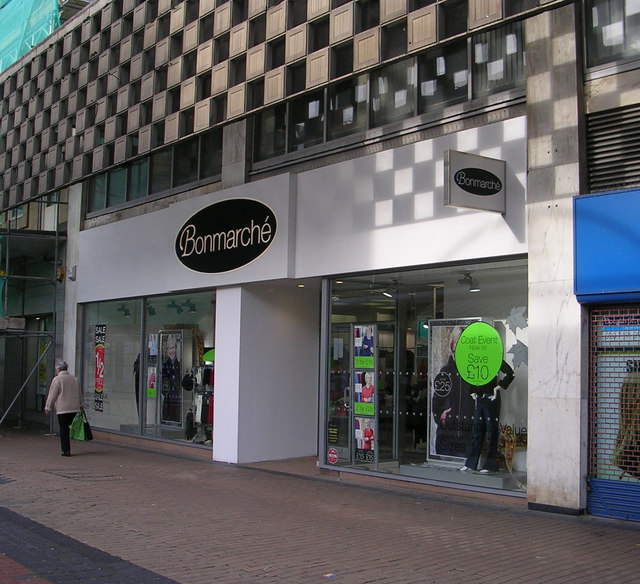
A branch of Bonmarché on Broadway in Bradford (2009)

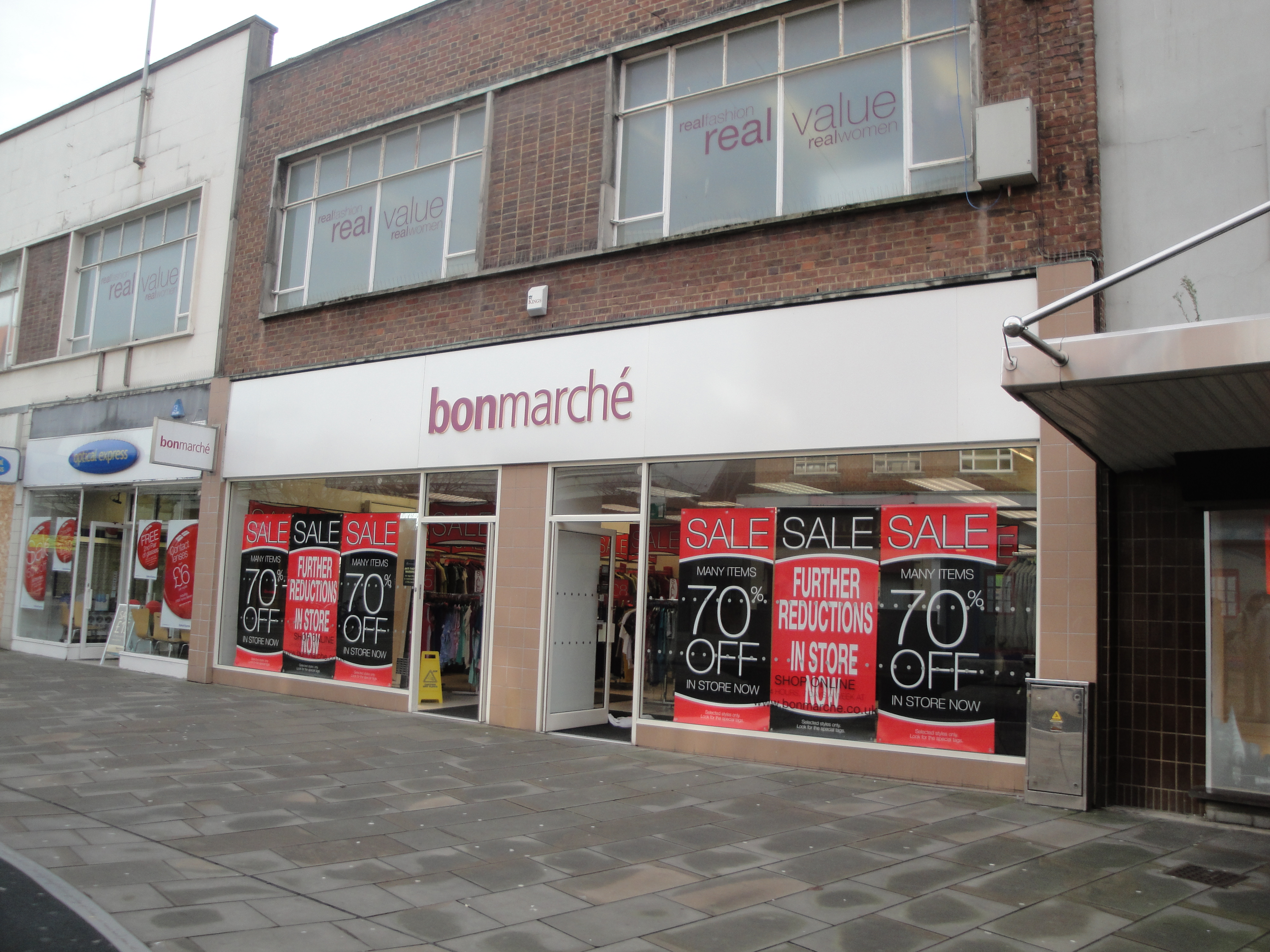
A Bonmarché store in Hampshire

Bonmarché was founded in 1982, by Parkash Singh Chima. The Sikh businessman arrived in the United Kingdom in 1950, from the Punjab and settled in Ely, Cambridgeshire, from where he launched a door-to-door business selling clothing items. The family bought two retail clothing firms in 1982 – Wiltex and Hartley – which had twenty six indoor market locations across the north of England.

Chima moved to Huddersfield, and ran the business with two of his sons, Gurchait and Gurnaik.

The first Bonmarché store opened in Doncaster in 1985, and this was the start of the chain that grew into more than three hundred stores, a huge headquarters at Grange Moor, and a turnover of more than £200 million. Chima retired and left two sons to run the business, before they sold to the Peacock Group in July 2002.

In March 2011, it was reported that Peacocks were looking to sell Bonmarché, and in January 2012, the business was sold for an undisclosed sum to private equity group Sun European Partners.

In July 2019, the company said that trading in recent months was so poor, it was recommending a £5.7M rescue bid from the owner of Edinburgh Woollen Mill, Philip Day, less than three months after rejecting it. The company was placed into administration on 18 October 2019. The administrators stated that initially, all stores would remain open, and no redundancies had yet been made.

== David Emanuel ==
In August 2007, Bonmarché launched a collection, designed in collaboration with David Emanuel, the designer famous for the co-design of Lady Diana Spencer's wedding dress in July 1981.

== Criticism ==
=== Building collapse at Savar ===
On 24 April 2013, the eight-story Rana Plaza commercial building collapsed in Savar, a sub district near Dhaka, the capital of Bangladesh. At least 1,127 people died, and over 2,438 were injured.

The factory housed a number of separate garment factories employing around 5,000 people, several shops, and a bank, and manufactured apparel for brands, including the Benetton Group, Joe Fresh, The Children's Place, Primark, Monsoon, and Dressbarn.

Of the twenty-nine brands identified as having sourced products from the Rana Plaza factories, only nine attended meetings held in November 2013 to agree on a proposal on compensation to the victims. The agreement was signed by Primark, Loblaw, Bonmarché and El Corte Ingles.
