= Peacocks (clothing) =

British fast-fashion retail chain

Anglo Global Property Limited
- Logo used since 2006

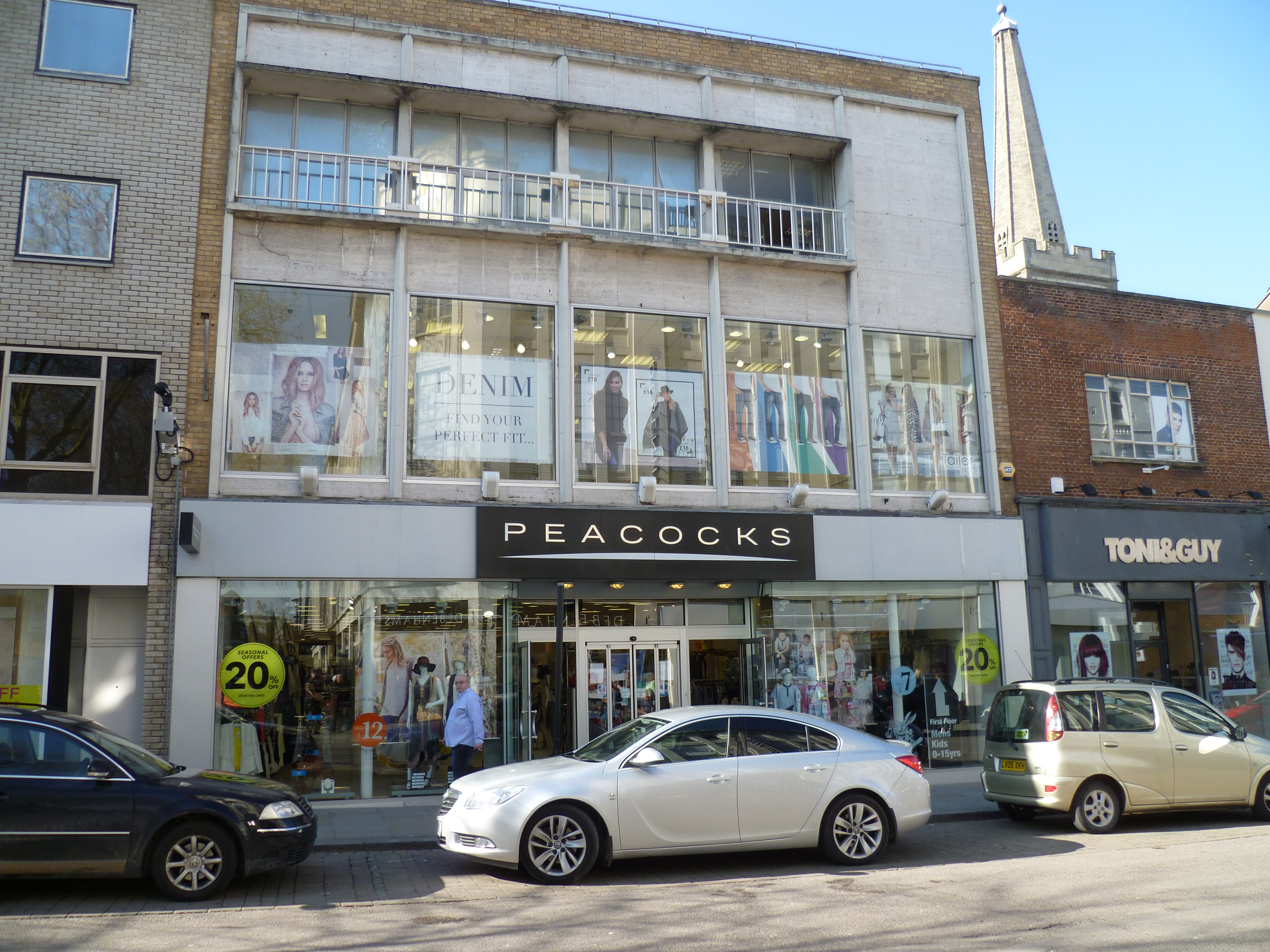
- A Peacocks location in Gloucester, pictured in April 2016
- Industry: Fashion
- Founded: Warrington, England (1884; 142 years ago)
- Founder: Albert Peacock
- Headquarters: Cardiff, Wales
- Number of locations: 345 (2024)
- Owner: Green Spark Holdings Limited
- Website: www.peacocks.co.uk

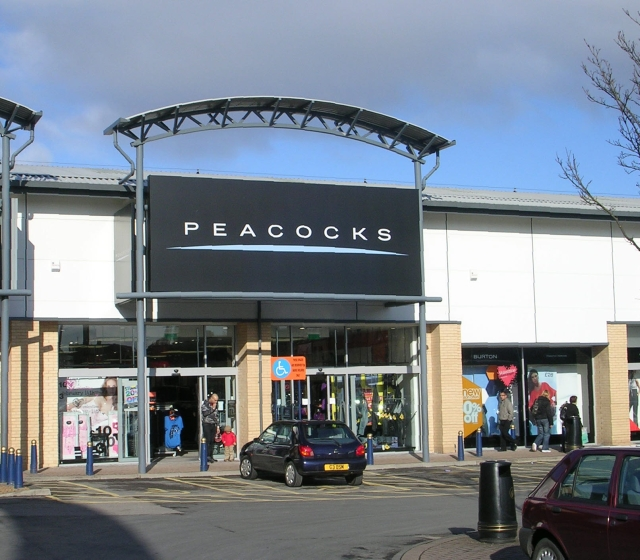
A Peacocks location in Bradford, pictured in February 2009.

Anglo Global Property Limited, trading as Peacocks, is a British clothing retailer, founded in Warrington in 1884.

Originally selling home goods and basic clothing, Peacocks later re-branded as a value fashion store. Richard Kirk, the former owner of the chain, worked hard to transform Peacocks into a major fashion player. The retailer won numerous awards, notably the Best Value Retailer award from Drapers.

In November 2020, its then-owners The Edinburgh Woollen Mill collapsed into administration. In January 2021, The Edinburgh Woollen Mill was rescued, but with the ownership of Peacocks being transferred out of the business in April 2021 to a separate sister company, Green Spark Holdings Limited.

== History ==
In 1884, Peacocks was established by Albert Peacock in Warrington as a family-run 'penny bazaar' business selling a wide range of goods.

The company relocated to Cardiff in the 1940s, the move having a profound impact on Peacocks' growth, allowing it to expand its presence in Southern England and Wales.

Peacocks expanded further in the early 1990s, and the company was listed on the London Stock Exchange in December 1999.

=== Management buyout ===
In October 2005, a £400 million management buyout led by Richard Kirk was negotiated, funded and organized by Echelon Capital and sponsored by Goldman Sachs, as well as hedge funds like Och-Ziff and Perry Capital controlling 55% of the new holding company. On 1 February 2006, the company unlisted from the exchange, and again became privately owned.

In line with the increased demand for value for money fashion, Peacocks began to provide high fashion women's wear, men's wear and children's wear. High street outlets were revamped and placed together, with a steer towards prime locations.

=== The Edinburgh Woollen Mill ownership ===
On 16 January 2012, Peacocks confirmed that it planned to enter administration, putting up to 100,000 jobs at risk. On 18 January 2012, KPMG was appointed administrators to Peacocks. On 19 January 2012, 250 head office staff were made redundant.

On 22 February 2012, it was announced that Peacocks had been sold to The Edinburgh Woollen Mill (EWM). EWM purchased the Peacocks brand, 388 outlets, concessions, the headquarters and logistics functions in Wales. 224 outlets were not sold to EWM, resulting in 3,100 immediate job losses. Some branches reopened, and EWM stated they had plans to open hundreds more stores in the United Kingdom and abroad in the future.

==== Restructure to Green Spark Holdings ====
On 19 November 2020, The Edinburgh Woollen Mill was placed into administration.

On 6 April 2021, it was announced that Peacocks had been brought out of administration by a senior executive backed by an international consortium of investors, called Green Spark Holdings Limited. The Edinburgh Woollen Mill Group's chief operating officer Steve Simpson will take over the business, saving 2000 jobs and 200 stores.

== International franchise branches ==
Outside of the United Kingdom, Peacocks franchises as 'Peacocks London'. These franchises comprise over two hundred outlets in Africa, Asia and Europe, including Bahrain, Cyprus, Egypt, Georgia, Gibraltar, Greece, Kuwait, Malta, Poland, Romania, Russia, Saudi Arabia, Serbia, Slovakia, Ukraine and the United Arab Emirates.
