= Hayton, Cumberland =

Village and civil parish in Cumbria, England

Coordinates: 54.911°N 2.769°W

Hayton
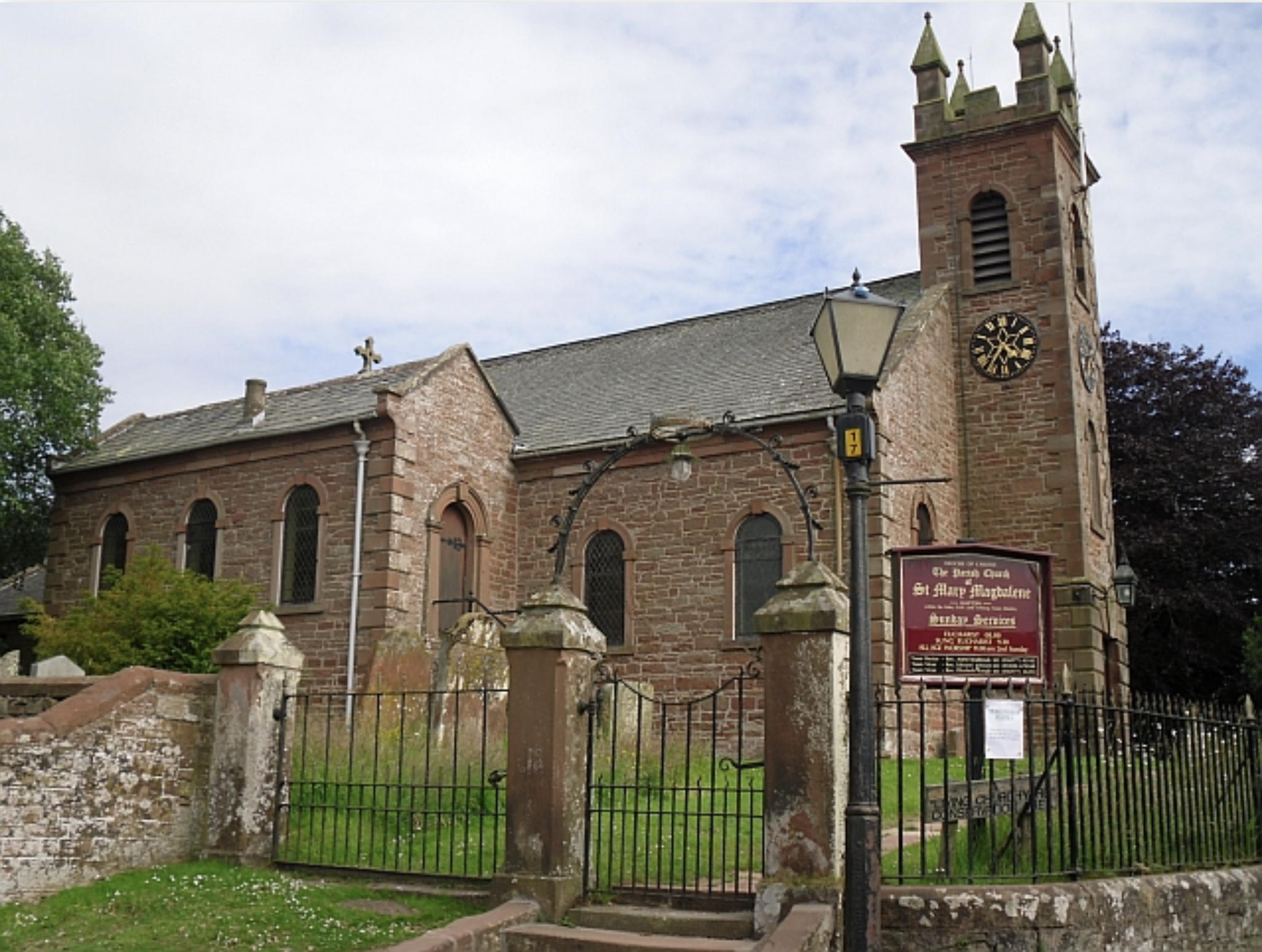
- Church of Mary Magdalene, Hayton

- Location within Cumbria
- Population: 2,149 (2021)
- OS grid reference: NY507576
- Civil parish: Hayton
- Unitary authority: Cumberland
- Ceremonial county: Cumbria
- Region: North West
- Country: England
- Sovereign state: United Kingdom
- Post town: BRAMPTON
- Postcode district: CA8
- Dialling code: 01228
- Police: Cumbria
- Fire: Cumbria
- Ambulance: North West
- UK Parliament: Carlisle

Hayton is a village and civil parish in the Cumberland district, in Cumbria, England, roughly 8 miles (13 km) east of Carlisle, and 10 miles (16 km) from the England/Scotland border. The population of the parish taken at the 2021 census was 2,149. Until 1974 it was in the county of Cumberland, from 1974 to 2023 it was in Carlisle district.

== Places of interest ==
- Edmond Castle
- Hayton Church of England primary school
- WI Hall, biannual Christmas pantomime
- St Mary Magdelene Church, the parish church
- Walnut Field, named after a walnut tree, the venue of the Bonfire Night celebrations
- The Stone Inn (public house)

== Notable people ==
- Field Marshal Sir Hew Dalrymple Ross (1779–1868), of Stone House
- General Sir John Ross (1829–1905), of Stone House

== Governance ==
An electoral ward in the same name exists. The population of this ward taken at the 2011 Census was 2,064.

== See also ==
- Listed buildings in Hayton, Cumberland
- King Water
- Solway Plain
- Talkin
