= Stobart =

Stobart or Stobbart /ˈstɔːbərt/ is an English surname, it may refer to:

== People ==
- Chuck Stobart (1932–2022), American footballer
- Dickie Stobbart (1891–1952), Canadian soccer player
- Eddie Stobart (1929–2024), British businessman, founded Eddie Stobart Group
- Edward Stobart (1954–2011), British businessman
- George Stobbart (1921–1995), English footballer
- J. C. Stobart (John Clarke Stobart, 1878–1933) British classical scholar, the BBC's first Director of Education
- John Stobart (1929–2023), British painter
- Kathy Stobart (1925–2014), British jazz musician
- Tom Stobart (1914–1980), British mountaineer and photographer, on the 1953 British Everest Expedition
- William Stobart (born 1961), British businessman

== Companies ==
- Logistics Development Group, formerly Eddie Stobart Logistics, logistics investment company with a 49% interest in Stobart (logistics company)
  - Stobart (logistics company), British logistics company
    - Stobart Rail Freight
    - Stobart Pullman
    - Stobart Motorsport
- Esken, (formerly Stobart Group), British infrastructure and support services company
- XYZ Rail & Civils, (formerly Stobart Rail & Civils), division of Bavaria Industries Group
