= Eddie Stobart: Trucks & Trailers =

British television documentary series

- Eddie Stobart: Trucks & Trailers Title Screen
- Also known as: Stobart: Trucks, Trains and Planes (series 6); Eddie Stobart's Excellent Adventures (series 7)
- Genre: Observational Documentary
- Created by: Princess Productions
- Directed by: Nelda Sale
- Starring: Mark Dixon; Lee Dowling; Matt Ekins; Mark Ashurst; Ashley Maddocks; Adam Clark; Mick Leech; Edward "Edd" Stobart; Fiona Soltysiak; Ray Broad; Tim Fox; Dale Dickinson; Andrew Tinkler; William Stobart
- Narrated by: Ben Crowe
- Country of origin: United Kingdom
- Original language: English
- No. of series: 7
- No. of episodes: 53

Production
- Executive producers: Kelly Webb-Lamb; Lorna-Dawn Creanor
- Producer: Nelda Sale
- Editor: Mark Henson
- Running time: 60 minutes (inc. adverts)
- Production companies: Mulholland Media; FIN

Original release
- Network: Channel 5
- Release: 24 September 2010 – 13 June 2014

Related
- Eddie Stobart: Trucks, Trailers & Tinsel; Eddie Stobart's Christmas Delivery; Eddie Stobart's Christmas Cracker; Eddie Stobart: 12 Days of Christmas

Eddie Stobart: Trucks & Trailers is a documentary television programme series exploring the world of the Eddie Stobart haulage company. The first broadcast of each episode is on Channel 5 on Friday evenings at 8 pm.

== About the show ==
Eddie Stobart: Trucks & Trailers features some of the day-to-day activities of the Stobart Group, a British logistics company, with a particular focus on its Eddie Stobart road haulage division.

This observational documentary series explores the daily operations of the British logistics and transport company Eddie Stobart Logistics, highlighting its road haulage, rail freight, and air divisions. Produced by Princess Productions for Channel 5, the episodes follow individual transport drivers tasked with delivering cargo under specific time constraints across the United Kingdom and Europe. Featured assignments include transporting specialized freight, such as turf for Cardiff's Millennium Stadium and components for landmarks like the Piccadilly lights. Media commentary has occasionally characterized the production style as 'sensationalist' due to its dramatic narration techniques and structural editing choices. Additionally, the program documents the recruitment and training processes within the firm, tracking twenty candidates who are competing for placement in the company's driver apprenticeship program.

The first four series saw the programme reach the top 10 of watched programmes for Channel 5, with the final two episodes of Series 2 taking first and second places for the week ending 3 July 2011.

A seventh series titled Eddie Stobart's Excellent Adventures shows a selection of memorable journeys from the previous series.

== Series overview ==
Series	Episodes	Originally released		DVD release date (Region 2)
Series	Episodes	First released	Last released	DVD release date (Region 2)
1	6	24 September 2010	29 October 2010	4 July 2011
2	8	20 May 2011	1 June 2011	7 November 2011
Christmas Special		24 December 2011		TBA
3	8	2 March 2012	20 April 2012	28 August 2012
4	8	14 September 2012	2 November 2012	25 March 2013
Christmas Special		24 December 2012		TBA
5	8	3 May 2013	21 June 2013	28 October 2013
6	7	8 November 2013	20 December 2013	TBA
Christmas Special		24 December 2013		TBA
7	4	23 May 2014	13 June 2014	TBA

== Episodes ==
=== Series 1 (2010) ===
No. in series	Title		Original release date
1	"Episode 1"	24 September 2010	1.85 [4]
Traffic jams around London and the company's monitoring techniques rile a veteran trucker who says it is "spying"
2	"Episode 2"	1 October 2010	1.78 [4]
A new truck causes a stir.
3	"Episode 3"	8 October 2010	1.75 [5]
A delivery to the World Rally Championship in Finland is jeopardised by a brake failure.
4	"Episode 4"	15 October 2010	1.93 [4]
The truckers demonstrate the precautions they must take to discourage stowaways.
5	"Episode 5"	22 October 2010	1.96 [4]
A lorry driver takes on the company train in a race.
6	"Episode 6"	29 October 2010	1.90 [3]
The truckers deliver a load of Formula One racing cars to the continent.

=== Series 2 (2011) ===
No. in series	Title		Original release date
1	"Episode 1"	20 May 2011	1.61 [5]
A runaway bull stops driver Ashley in his tracks.
2	"Episode 2"	27 May 2011	1.62 [6]
The company unveils its new fleet of modern trucks.
3	"Episode 3"	3 June 2011	1.42 [7]
The rail division pull their weight.
4	"Episode 4"	10 June 2011	1.51 [5]
Aidan's load is a bit tipsy and Andy takes a test drive.
5	"Episode 5"	17 June 2011	1.79 [3]
An Easter-egg problem needs cracking.
6	"Episode 6"	24 June 2011	1.50 [4]
This episode focuses on the work of former armed service members within Eddie Stobart.
7	"Episode 7"	30 June 2011	1.58 [1]
Edward Stobart Jr gets behind the wheel of a truck.
8	"Episode 8"	1 July 2011	1.61 [2]
Stobart takes to the skies when it invests in an airline.

==== 2011 Christmas Special ====
No. in series	Title		Original release date
1	"Eddie Stobart's Christmas Delivery"	24 December 2011	1.42 [6]
The legendary trucks and truckers battle wintry conditions as they face one of their busiest times of year.

=== Series 3 (2012) ===
No. in series	Title		Original release date
1	"Episode 1"	2 March 2012	1.82 [4]
It is panic stations when the haulage firm's trucking festival needs a last-minute change of venue.
2	"Episode 2"	9 March 2012	1.72 [7]
Two unlucky passengers come unstuck at Southend Airport as the company attempt to conquer the airways in their latest £100million venture.
3	"Episode 3"	16 March 2012	1.78 [6]
Elliott has to perform a tricky delivery in Yorkshire.
4	"Episode 4"	23 March 2012	1.57 [6]
An overnight job for the Stobart rail crew faces derailment. Can they complete the work in time?
5	"Episode 5"	30 March 2012	1.55 [6]
The company announce the name of its newest truck, while a drop in Birmingham causes big problems.
6	"Episode 6"	6 April 2012	1.54 [9]
A plane spills waste onto the runway at Southend airport.
7	"Episode 7"	13 April 2012	1.78 [7]
Trucker Kevin dashes to aid a member of the public.
8	"Episode 8"	20 April 2012	1.40 [7]
Stobart truckers Ashley and Mark go head to head in a Wales v England truck-off. Last in series.

=== Series 4 (2012) ===
No. in series	Title		Original release date
1	"Episode 1"	14 September 2012	1.42 [4]
A trucking convoy drives through the Alps.
2	"Episode 2"	21 September 2012	1.37 [6]
The bosses' thoroughbred horses are despatched to Newmarket.
3	"Episode 3"	28 September 2012	1.31 [4]
Fiona gets hot under the collar delivering 26 tonnes of ice.
4	"Episode 4"	5 October 2012	1.25 [4]
Neil has his hands full driving a 61ft road train.
5	"Episode 5"	12 October 2012	1.48 [4]
A mega convoy of 16 brand new Stobart trucks sets off.
6	"Episode 6"	19 October 2012	1.37 [8]
Jimmy Callaghan does battle with some troublesome bollards.
7	"Episode 7"	26 October 2012	1.36 [9]
Trucker Jimmy Callaghan battles freak snowy weather.
8	"Episode 8"	2 November 2012	1.42 [4]
The team waterproof a railway bridge across the M6.

==== 2012 Christmas Special ====
No. in series	Title		Original release date
1	"Eddie Stobart's Christmas Cracker"	24 December 2012	1.39 [8]
A town in the north of England is due a delivery of reindeer for their annual Christmas parade. The truckers deliver Christmas goods to the people of Britain and also release their very own Christmas single.

=== Series 5 (2013) ===
No. in series	Title		Original release date
1	"Episode 1"	3 May 2013	1.46 [4]
Mark transports 25 tonnes of logs from Scotland to Kent.
2	"Episode 2"	10 May 2013	1.26 [6]
Matt becomes the centre of attention in London.
3	"Episode 3"	17 May 2013	1.20 [8]
The red-and-green army faces atrocious winter weather.
4	"Episode 4"	24 May 2013	1.15 [8]
Craig has a foggy trip over the Pennines.
5	"Episode 5"	31 May 2013	0.88 [15]
Transporting a huge replica plane causes a few headaches.
6	"Episode 6"	7 June 2013	1.01 [13]
Matt swaps the classroom for the cab.
7	"Episode 7"	14 June 2013	1.09 [12]
Jimmy catches a cold in the Lake District.
8	"Episode 8"	21 June 2013	0.99 [19]
Tim Fox embarks on an epic biomass delivery.

=== Series 6 (2013) ===
This series is also known as Stobart: Trucks, Trains and Planes.

No. in series	Title		Original release date
1	"Episode 1"	8 November 2013	1.18 [7]
Observational documentary series following the haulage firm.
2	"Episode 2"	15 November 2013	0.94 [22]
Mark Dixon and his leading lady, faithful truck Phoebe Grace, come to the end of the road together.
3	"Episode 3"	22 November 2013	1.08 [8]
Tim has his biomass credentials put to the test.
4	"Episode 4"	29 November 2013	1.30 [6]
Gareth is hit by delays on the notorious A9.
5	"Episode 5"	6 December 2013	TBA
Adam, the boss's son, gets to grips with the timber trail.
6	"Episode 6"	13 December 2013	N/A
Preparations are afoot for the annual Stobart Fest.
7	"Episode 7"	20 December 2013	N/A
Series about one of the world's biggest haulage firms.

==== 2013 Christmas Special ====
No. in series	Title		Original release date
1	"Eddie Stobart: 12 Days of Christmas"	24 December 2013	N/A
A seasonal helping reliving the 12 best Christmas moments from the trucking calendar.

=== Series 7 (2014) ===
This series is also known as Eddie Stobart's Excellent Adventures.

No. in series	Title		Original release date
1	"Episode 1"	23 May 2014	N/A
Welshman Ashley Maddocks has the day from hell when a runaway bull plays havoc with his delivery.
2	"Episode 2"	30 May 2014	N/A
Long-distance driver Mark Dixon attempts to race the company’s train to Scotland.
3	"Episode 3"	6 June 2014	N/A
Tim Fox and Craig Garside battle to deliver their loads first.
4	"Episode 4"	13 June 2014	N/A
Tim takes a trip across Scotland, and the firm relocates.

Notes:

- First Broadcast Date are for showings on Channel 5 (United Kingdom)
- Viewer numbers are the combined numbers of those watching on television the 8pm airing on Channel 5, Channel 5 HD, and the 9pm airing on Channel 5+1 for the First Broadcast date only.
- Airings on later days, and those watched by using other catchup services such as Five On Demand and Sky Plus are not included.
- Numbers in brackets [4] indicate the programme's position of watched programmes on Channel 5 in the same week
