= Stobart Rail =

Stobart Rail may refer to:

- Stobart Rail Freight, a railway freight service operator in the United Kingdom
- XYZ Rail & Civils, (formerly Stobart Rail & Civils), a railway maintenance and infrastructure engineering company in the United Kingdom

== See also ==
- Eddie Stobart Group
- Esken
