= Stobart Rail Freight =

Stobart Rail Freight Ltd
- Type: Private limited company
- Industry: Rail Freight
- Founded: 10 October 2006
- Founder: WA Developments
- Defunct: 13 June 2021
- Headquarters: Warrington, Cheshire, England
- Area served: United Kingdom
- Key people: William Stobart (Executive Chairman)
- Parent: Eddie Stobart Logistics
- Website: www.eddiestobart.com/our-operations/rail

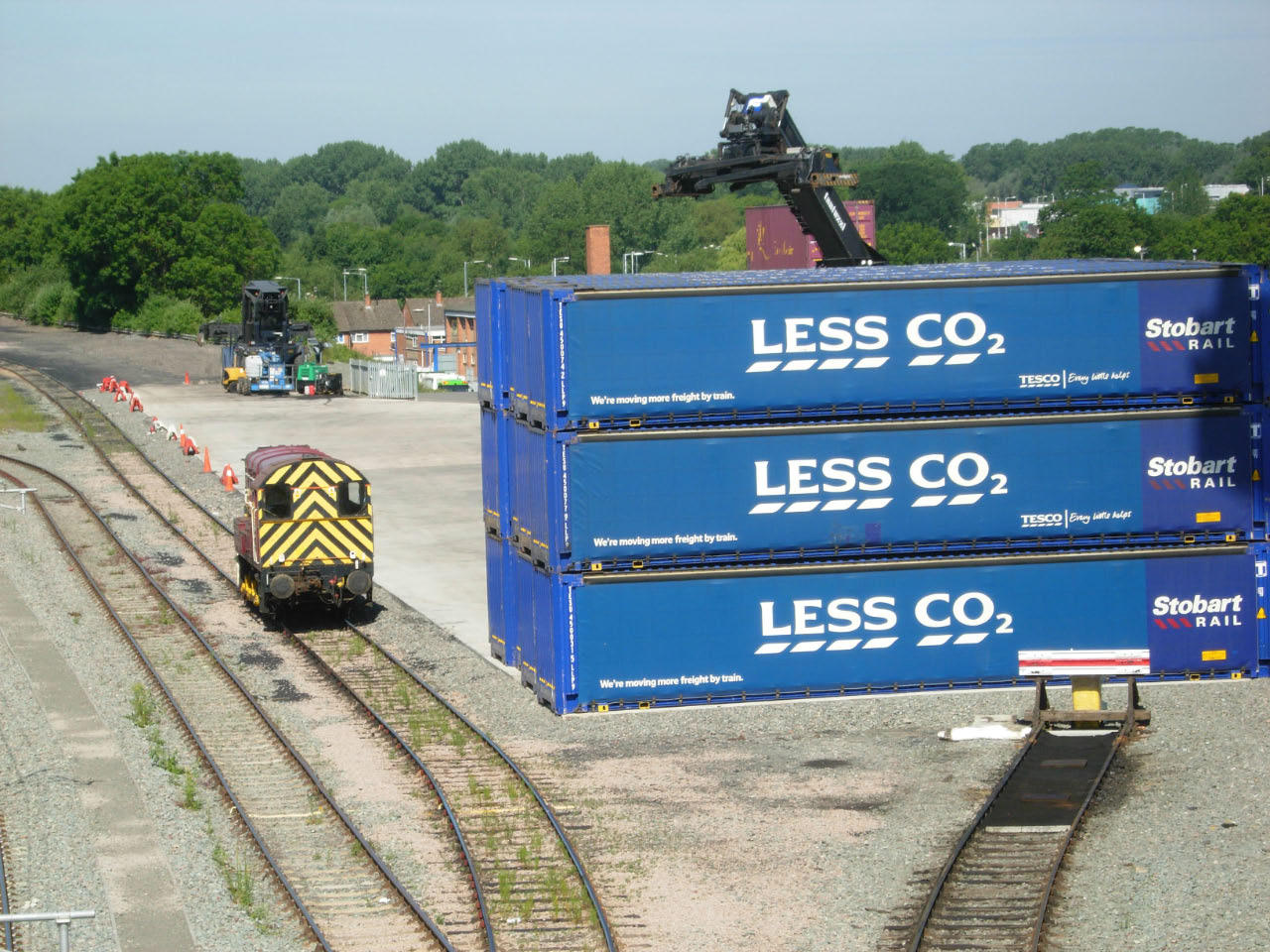
Stobart Rail containers at Rugby inter-modal yard

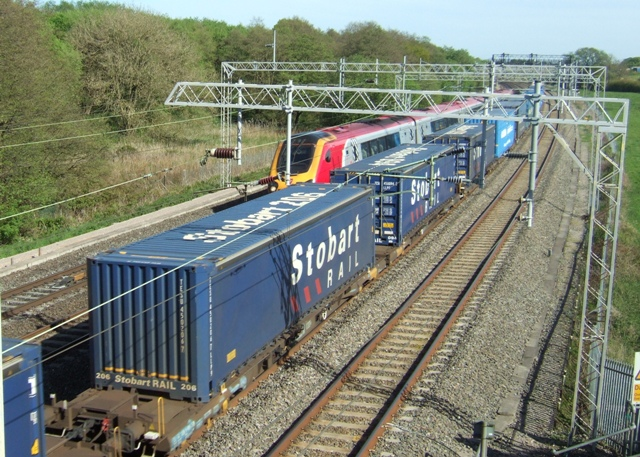
Stobart Rail containers at speed on the West Coast Mainline

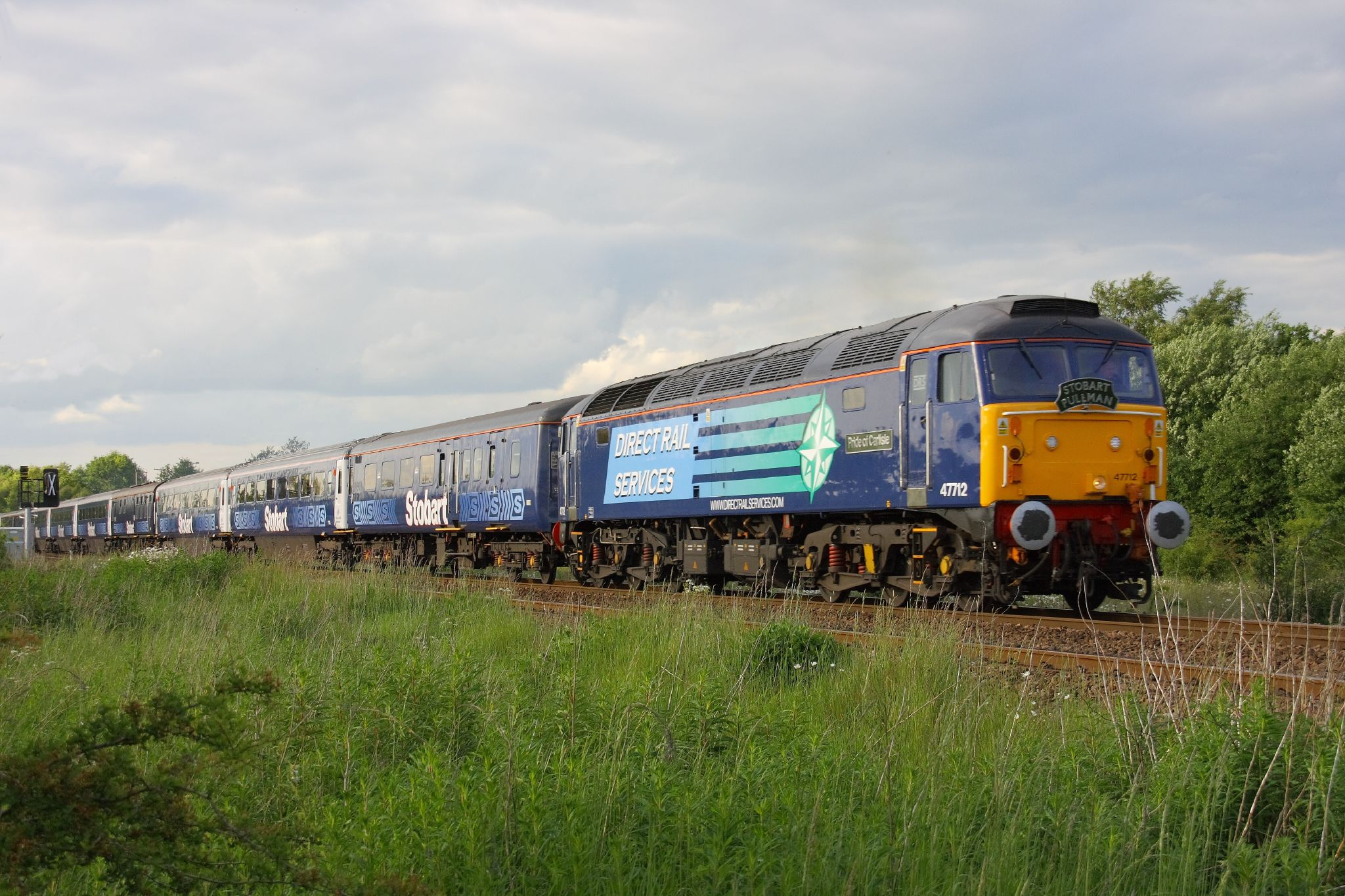
The charter service Stobart Pullman being pulled by original rail transport partner, Direct Rail Services Class 47 No. 47712

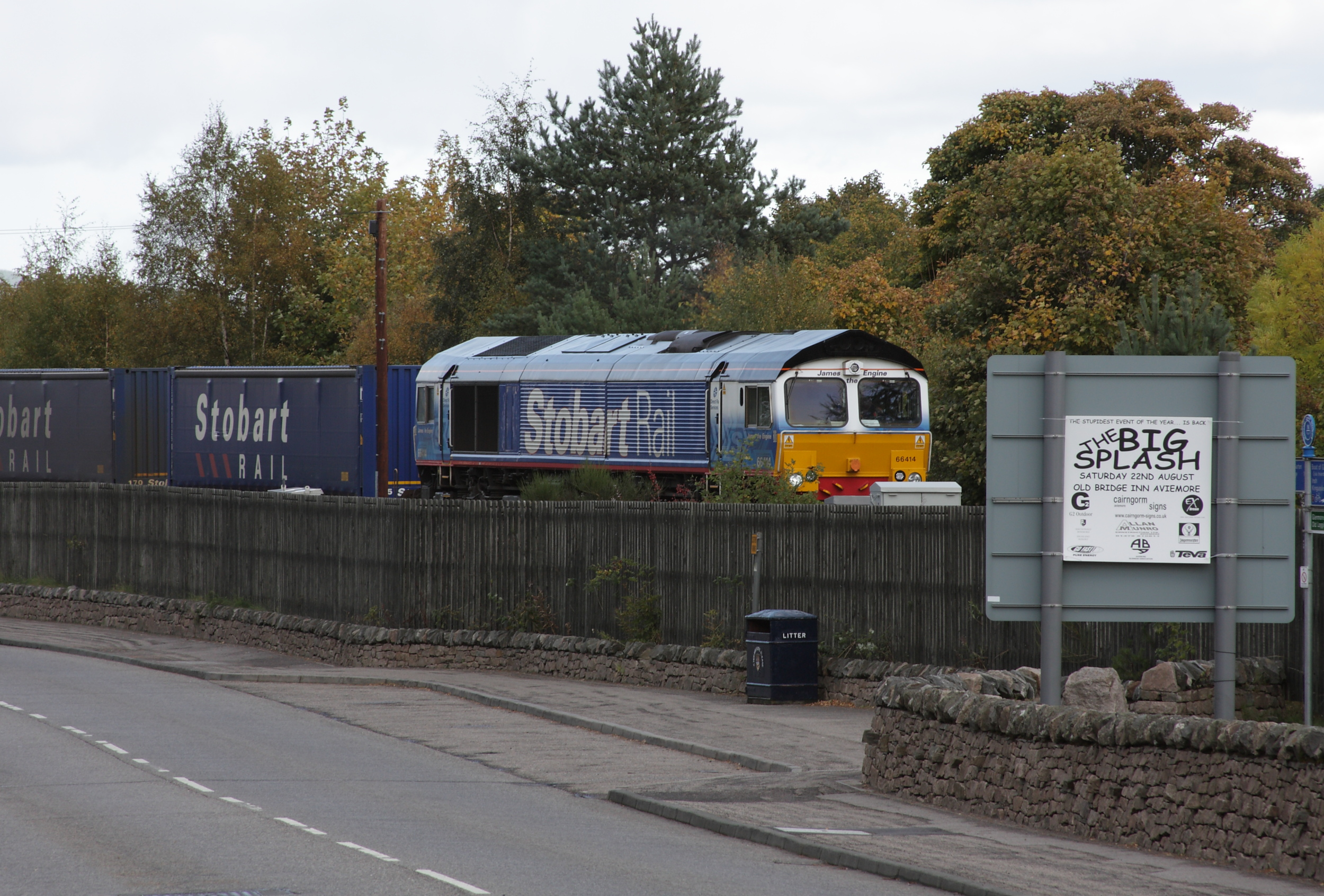
Direct Rail Services Class 66 No.66414 in Stobart Rail livery leaves Aviemore with 4N47 Inverness - Grangemouth intermodal service

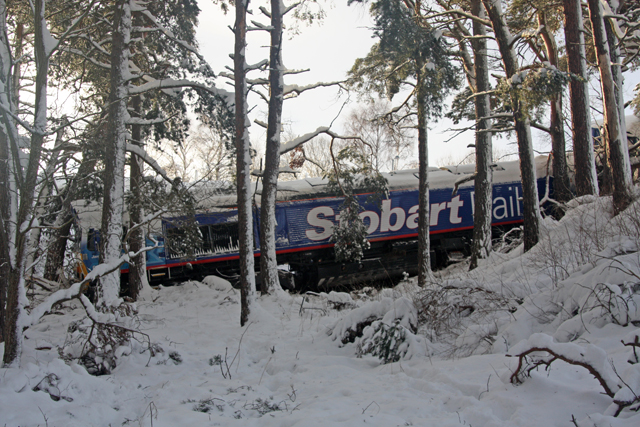
DB Schenker Class 66 No.66048 James the Engine in Stobart Rail livery, after the 4 January 2010 derailment at Carrbridge

Stobart Rail Freight Ltd (trading as Stobart Rail) was a railway freight service operator in the United Kingdom. It came under the Rail division of Eddie Stobart Logistics, and carried intermodal freight for the group.

On 19 September 2006, Stobart Rail launched its inaugural daily freight service for a three-year deal to deliver cross-border goods for the British retailer Tesco. The service was initially operated by Direct Rail Services (DRS), which provided both the locomotives and traincrew; Stobart supplied the shipping container and depot facilities. During February 2008, Stobart Rail commenced operating passenger charter services under the Stobart Pullman brand, using rolling stock leased from DRS. Five months later, the Stobart Pullman permanently ceased operations. During May 2008, Stobart announced that a second contract had been awarded by Tesco.

During August 2009, it was announced that Stobart had transferred the operation of its rail operations to DB Schenker; two months later, it launched the longest train journey in Europe by a single operator, covering 1,100 miles (1,800 km) between Valencia, Spain and Dagenham, East London, via the Eurotunnel once per week. By 2013, Stobart's rail hub at Widnes was handling five trains per day on behalf of clients such as Matalan, Littlewoods, B&Q, Comet, and Guinness. During September 2018, Stobart announced the launch of a new train service between the port of Tilbury and Daventry, hauled by DRS.

== History ==
On 19 September 2006, Stobart Rail commenced a daily delivery train on behalf of the British retailer Tesco under a three-year arrangement to transport goods by rail, this service switched 70 per cent of its retailer's cross-border traffic from road to rail. Ran daily, these trains collected Tesco products that had been separately transported from various sites around the Midlands to the company's depot at Daventry International Railfreight Terminal (DIRFT) in Rugby, hauling them to the Grangemouth Rail terminal in Scotland. On the return journey to Rugby, roughly 90% of its capacity would typically be filled by Tesco while the remaining 10% would be occupied by Coca-Cola; one train could convey the equivalent of 26 lorries in each direction each day. Stobart Rail had reportedly invested £5.5 million into this inaugural rail freight service.

The company had arranged for the provision of Class 66 locomotives to be both supplied and operated by Direct Rail Services (DRS) to haul its services. Each train consisted of 26 specially designed 45 feet (14 m) curtain-sided shipping containers, which at 8 feet 6 inches (2.59 m) in height are within the UK loading gauge; Stobart purchased 90 of these new containers to provide this service. The train travels at an average speed of 40 miles per hour (64 km/h), which is comparable with a lorry, although the whole process takes slightly longer because of additional loading and unloading. Over the three-year timespan, it was estimated that the Tesco freight service will replace 130,000 lorry journeys and save three million road miles per year. Stobart received £400,000 from the UK Government and the Scottish Executive to encourage and part-finance the switch from road to rail. The train was marked in Tesco corporate colours.

Stobart had previously transported some of its freight by rail, using Stobart-liveried IWB Ferrywagons hired from Tiphook.

During February 2008, Stobart Rail commenced operating passenger charter services under the Stobart Pullman brand, having purchased Hertfordshire Rail Tours from the administrator of FM Rail. Both the motive power and a set of Mark 3 carriages were leased from DRS. However, after only five months of operation, Stobart Group permanently ceased operations of the Stobart Pullman in July 2008.

During May 2008, Stobart announced that a second contract had been awarded from Tesco for the haulage of goods by rail between Grangemouth and Inverness. Services under this contract, which was valued at £15 million and covered a five-year period, started in September of that year. The Daventry – Scotland Stobart contract transferred to DB Schenker in January 2010, along with the onward daily service to Inverness, though this reverted to DRS operation in summer 2011.

In May 2008, Stobart's chief executive Andrew Tinkler announced that the company was in the advanced stages of planning for an additional six train-based services, not counting the existing freight contracts with Tesco. During August 2009, it was announced that Stobart had transferred the operation of its rail operations to DB Schenker, a division of the German state owned railway company Deutsche Bahn, in the place of DRS.

On 30 October 2009, Stobart commenced a weekly international train service, operated via DB Schenker. Covering a 1,100 miles (1,800 km) distance, it span from Valencia, Spain to the Ripple Lane intermodal depot in Dagenham, East London, via the Eurotunnel. The fully refrigerated goods service, which provided an alternative to lorries for the import of fresh Spanish salad-vegetables, was the longest train journey in Europe by a single operator at the time.

On 4 January 2010, a freight train hauling container flats from Inverness to Mossend, hauled by DB Schenker on behalf of Stobart Rail, derailed at Carrbridge amid snowy weather, temporarily blocking the Highland Main Line. The accident result in no deaths, but two of the train crew were injured.

During 2013, Stobart announced plans to develop a inland container port at Widnes, creating as many as 10,000 new jobs; by this point, its existing rail hub at Widnes currently handled five trains per day on behalf of various clients, including Matalan, Littlewoods, B&Q, Comet, and Guinness, but had capacity for as many as 12 daily deliveries by rail via the West Coast Main Line.

During September 2018, Stobart announced the launch of a new train service hauled by DRS. This Stobart-branded train ran three days per week between the port of Tilbury and Daventry, as well as twice weekly between Daventry and Mossend.

== See also ==
- Rail freight in Great Britain
- Eddie Stobart Logistics
