= James Irlam =

British road haulage company

Coordinates: 53°16′12″N 2°16′57″W

James Irlam & Sons Ltd
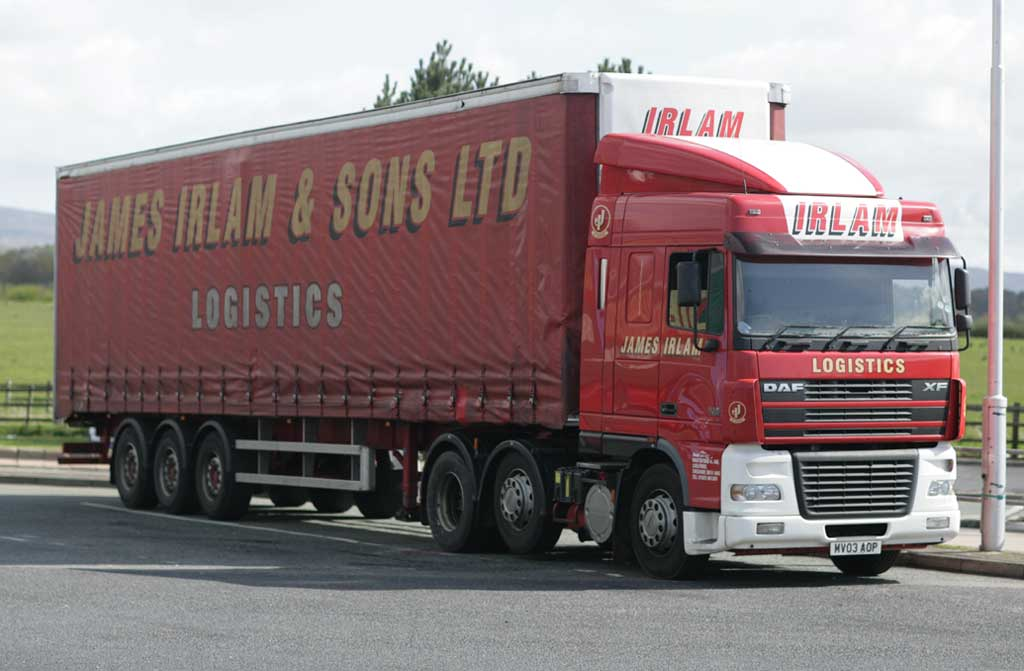
- Truck in James Irlam & Sons livery
- Company type: Private
- Industry: Logistics
- Founded: 1940s
- Founder: James Irlam
- Defunct: 2011
- Fate: Defunct, Purchased by Stobart Group and re branded
- Successor: Eddie Stobart Logistics
- Headquarters: Chelford, Cheshire, England, United Kingdom
- Key people: David Irlam, CEO
- Revenue: £50 million (2007)
- Net income: £1.2 million (2007)
- Number of employees: 674 (2008)
- Parent: Stobart Group
- Subsidiaries: Irlam Storage LLP
- Website: www.jamesirlam.co.uk

James Irlam & Sons Ltd (later trading as James Irlam Logistics) was a British road haulage company founded in the 1940s by James Irlam. It was owned and run by the Irlam family until its acquisition by rival logistics firm the Stobart Group in April 2008 for £59.9 million.

== History ==
=== The beginning ===
James Irlam & Sons Ltd was founded by James Irlam in the 1940s in Manchester. Following the development of Manchester Airport, the business relocated to Chelford, Cheshire. The business transported milk churns to Manchester dairies, and returned with corn supplies for local farms.

=== Ken Irlam takes over ===
His son, Ken Irlam, later took over the running of the firm. In 1964 the firm operated from just one truck.

=== Passing to the grandsons ===
The business later passed to Ken Irlam's four sons, David Irlam, Michael Irlam, Andrew Irlam and Stewart Irlam. David Irlam became Chief Executive, Michael Irlam became Managing Director, Andrew Irlam became Operations Director and Stewart Irlam became Finance Director. Andrew sold his 25% share of the business to his three brothers in 2004, to pursue ventures in commercial property.

By 2007, James Irlam had grown to such an extent that it had major clients including Procter & Gamble, B&Q, Groupe Danone, Coca-Cola, Ministry of Defence (United Kingdom), Unilever, Tesco, Johnson & Johnson, Mars, Incorporated, Golden Wonder, Britvic and GlaxoSmithKline.

=== Sale to the Stobart Group ===
At the end of 2007, its rival, the Stobart Group (who shared some of the same clients as James Irlam), approached the Irlam family with a view to acquiring their firm. In January 2008, Ken Irlam died, and shortly afterwards, David Irlam, Michael Irlam and Stewart Irlam agreed to sell James Irlam & Sons Ltd and its subsidiary, Irlam Storage LLP, for a total consideration of £59.9 million to the Stobart Group.

The deal, announced on 10 March 2008 and completed on 4 April 2008, was for £36.2 million in cash, £10 million in new Stobart Group shares, and £13.7 million in Loan Notes. As a result, the Irlam family now own 2.88% of the enlarged Stobart Group. David Irlam also joined the Board of Directors of the Stobart Group as an Executive Director.

Initially, the James Irlam brand and livery were to remain, but James Irlam has since been completely integrated into the core Eddie Stobart Ltd business, and re branded under the core brand name Eddie Stobart. David Irlam stepped down from the Stobart Group Board of Directors on 8 March 2011, but remains with the Stobart Group in the same title of Executive Director.

=== Red Lorries.com Ltd ===
On 18 September 2012, Red Lorries.com Ltd was set up as a registered company with companies house. The directors of the company are David Irlam and Michael Irlam.

=== Football ===
In 2001 James Irlam were sponsor for the Cheshire Football team Macclesfield Town. There was also a special blue truck for the club too.

== See also ==
- Stobart Group
- Eddie Stobart
