= Logistics Development Group =

Investment Company specialising in logistics

Logistics Development Group plc
- Company type: Public Limited Company
- Traded as: LSE: LDG
- ISIN: GB00BD8QVC95
- Industry: Investment
- Predecessor: Eddie Stobart Logistics plc
- Headquarters: Cheshire
- Website: ldgplc.com

Logistics Development Group plc, formerly Eddie Stobart Logistics plc, is an investment company with interests in the logistics industry.

== History ==
In March 2014 Stobart Group announced its intention to re-position itself as a support services business, with the announcement of the sale of its original transport and distribution business to Dbay Advisors Limited (formerly Douglas Bay Capital) for £280.8 million: Dbay Advisors secured a 49% stake in the newly formed business Eddie Stobart Logistics. William Stobart left his position as Chief Operating Officer the Stobart Group to become chief executive officer of Eddie Stobart Logistics.

In April 2017, Eddie Stobart Logistics regained a public listing when it floated on the Alternative Investment Market of the London Stock Exchange, with a £572 million valuation.

Eddie Stobart Logistics subsequently acquired stakes in iForce (April 2017), Speedy Freight (July 2017), The Logistics People (August 2017) and The Pallet Network (June 2018).

In August 2019, it was announced that chief executive Alex Laffey would step down with immediate effect amid the ongoing accounting probe. He was replaced by Sebastien Desreumaux, the chief executive of subsidiary iForce and head of contract logistics at the group.

In September 2019, the company said that it had received buyout interest from Dbay Advisors.

In October 2019, Wincanton plc expressed an interest in merging with Eddie Stobart. Wincanton, later withdrew its offer, saying that it had “yet to receive full disclosure of the information requested to enable it to complete its due diligence exercise”.

In November 2019, former Eddie Stobart boss Andrew Tinkler tabled a rival rescue proposal. DBay increased its holding in Eddie Stobart Logistics from 10% to 27% on 29 November 2019 after it bought Woodford Asset Management's stake in an off-market deal at just 6p a share. It was reported that Woodford Asset Management made a £56 million loss on the sale.

In December 2019, DBay Advisors provided financial support in the form of a £55 million loan bearing interest at 18%; it also increased its shareholding to 51%. It was also announced that William Stobart was rejoining the business.

On 31 December 2020 the company was re-admitted to the Alternative Investment Market as an investing company managed by DBay Advisers with an investing policy focused on logistics assets.

The company changed its name from Eddie Stobart Logistics to Logistics Development Group in February 2021.

The company sold its interest in the Eddie Stobart Group to Culina Group in July 2021.
