= Connect Airways =

British business consortium

Connect Airways Limited
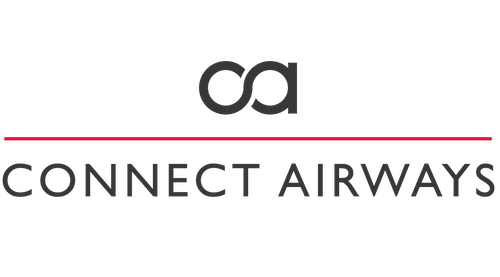
- Company type: Private limited company
- Industry: Aviation
- Founded: 18 December 2018
- Founders: Virgin Atlantic; Stobart Aviation
- Defunct: 10 March 2020
- Fate: Under administration
- Headquarters: Exeter Airport, Devon, England
- Key people: Mark Anderson, CEO
- Products: Airlines
- Owners: Virgin Atlantic (30%); Stobart Aviation (30%); Cyrus Capital Partners (40%)
- Subsidiaries: Flybe
- Website: connect-airways.com

Connect Airways was a consortium formed in December 2018 to acquire the British regional airline Flybe, which had put itself up for sale in November 2018 after issuing a profit warning the previous month, The consortium comprised Virgin Atlantic and the Irish wet-lease specialist airline Stobart Air.

The consortium was founded by Virgin Atlantic, Stobart Aviation and Cyrus Capital Partners through its Luxembourg-based vehicle DLP Holdings. Virgin and Stobart each held 30% of the capital with Cyrus holding the remaining 40%. Cyrus Capital had previously worked with Virgin Group on the launch of its Virgin America airline and its subsequent sale to Alaska Airlines.

The purchase of the operating assets of the Flybe Group was completed on 21 February 2019.

On 5 March 2020, the consortium was unable to commit further financial support and Flybe entered administration, ceasing all operations. On 10 March 2020, Connect Airways in turn entered administration.

== History ==
On 11 January 2019, Connect Airways made a £2.2 million cash offer to take over the entire share capital of Flybe, subject to shareholder and court approval. The offer also included the acquisition of Stobart Air shortly before the Flybe takeover.

On 15 January 2019, Connect Airways increased its offer by £600,000, and set out improved bridging loan conditions, with £10 million to be released immediately to support Flybe's business, and a further £10 million available. Subsequent funding of £80 million was also confirmed. Flybe Group accepted the £2.8 million offer and noted that its shares had been transferred to a standard listing, effective on 17 January, meaning that shareholder approval for the sale of the group's operating assets, i.e. the airline and the website, would no longer be required. The deadline for the deal to close was 22 February 2019.

On 21 February 2019, Flybe Group confirmed that its operating assets, i.e. the airline and the website, had indeed been transferred to Connect Airways, despite a last-minute rival bid. The sale of the parent company, Flybe Group plc – now an empty shell – was confirmed by its shareholders at a meeting on 4 March and became effective on 11 March.

On 5 July 2019, merger clearance from the European Commission was granted, giving Connect Airways full control of the Flybe assets. This was conditional on Connect Airways releasing slot pairs at both Amsterdam–Schiphol and Paris–Charles de Gaulle.

In 2020 the consortium would have rebranded Flybe as Virgin Connect and changed its values to align the airline with the Virgin brand. The aim was to create a "fully-fledged UK network carrier" with an enhanced presence at Heathrow and Manchester airports. Flybe and Stobart Air would have however retained their own Air Operator Certificates and Stobart Air's franchise/wet lease operations for other airlines would have continued. Virgin Atlantic had previously operated domestic routes from Heathrow under their Virgin Atlantic Little Red subsidiary between 2013 and 2015; these routes were subsequently taken over by Flybe in 2017.

As of January 2020, the Virgin Connect website contained some basic information and FAQs about the further plans for the rebranding but would have eventually become the website used to book flights from 2020. The Virgin group also launched a new landing page to avoid confusion with the existing Virgin Connect brand used in Russia for internet and mobile services.

In February 2020, the UK government envisaged granting Flybe a £100 million rescue loan, and held talks with the EU Commission to ensure that state aid rules were not broken.

In the early morning of 5 March 2020, Flybe filed for administration and ceased all operations with immediate effect after the UK government failed to grant a proposed £100 million ($129 million) loan. Virgin Atlantic stated that Connect Airways could "no longer commit to continued financial support" despite its investment of over £135 million, and placed part of the blame on the negative impact of the COVID-19 pandemic on Flybe's trading.

On 10 March 2020, Connect Airways in turn entered administration.

On 27 April 2020, Stobart Group bought back Stobart Air and Propius Leasing from Connect Airways administrators Ernst & Young, for an initial payment of £300,000 and deferred consideration that could total £8.25 million.
