= Hertfordshire Rail Tours =

Travel agency in the United Kingdom

- Industry: Rail transport
- Founded: 1979
- Founder: John Farrow
- Defunct: 2008
- Headquarters: England
- Owner: Stobart Group

Hertfordshire Rail Tours was a company that operated charter trains in the United Kingdom. Founded in Hertfordshire by John Farrow, most of its trains started from London Terminals. The company was purchased by FM Rail in September 2005. FM Rail went into liquidation in December 2006, and the Hertfordshire Rail Tours business passed to Victa Westlink Rail, a joint venture between Victa Railfreight and Westlink.

In August 2007 the Hertfordshire Rail Tours business was sold to the Stobart Group and renamed Stobart Rail Tours. The tour programme was scaled back and relaunched as the Stobart Pullman, using Direct Rail Services Class 47s and Mark 3 carriages. It ceased in July 2008.

== Blue Pullman ==
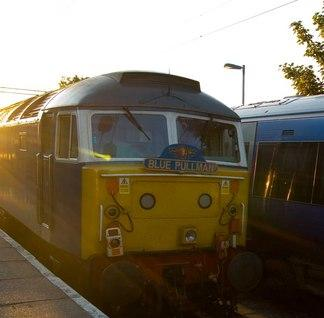
Blue Pullman headboard on 47712 in June 2006

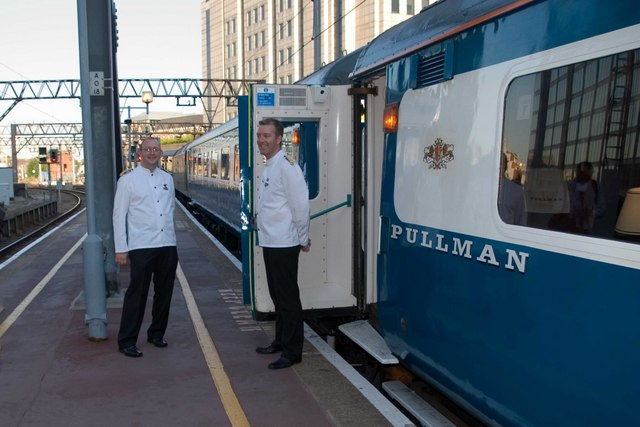
Blue Pullman train at Fenchurch Street railway station in June 2006

With the market for charter trains appearing buoyant and the company wishing to develop into more lucrative fields, FM Rail decided to re-introduce a Blue Pullman from the beginning of 2006, reminiscent of the Blue Pullman diesel multiple units that operated between London Paddington and Bristol during the 1960s.

With none of the original stock preserved, it had to provide a new fleet, which consisted of a rake of air-conditioned Mark 2 carriages fitted with Pullman style lighting, topped and tailed by Class 47 diesel locomotives. As no Mark 2 kitchen cars were built, two Mark 1 carriages were included in the set. The Mark 2s were painted in the original livery of nanking blue with a white band around the windows, but, as the Mark 1s had much larger windows, they were simply painted in plain blue.

The first outing of the Blue Pullman was a dining excursion from Kings Cross and back via Ely and Peterborough on 12 January 2006.

The service, although normally worked by two Class 47s also painted in the dedicated blue livery, would be hauled by a GB Railfreight Class 87 if the entire working was due to be under the wires. The Blue Pullman carriages passed to Cotswold Rail, which re-launched the service in February 2007.
