= Stobart Pullman =

British railtour operator

Stobart Pullman logo

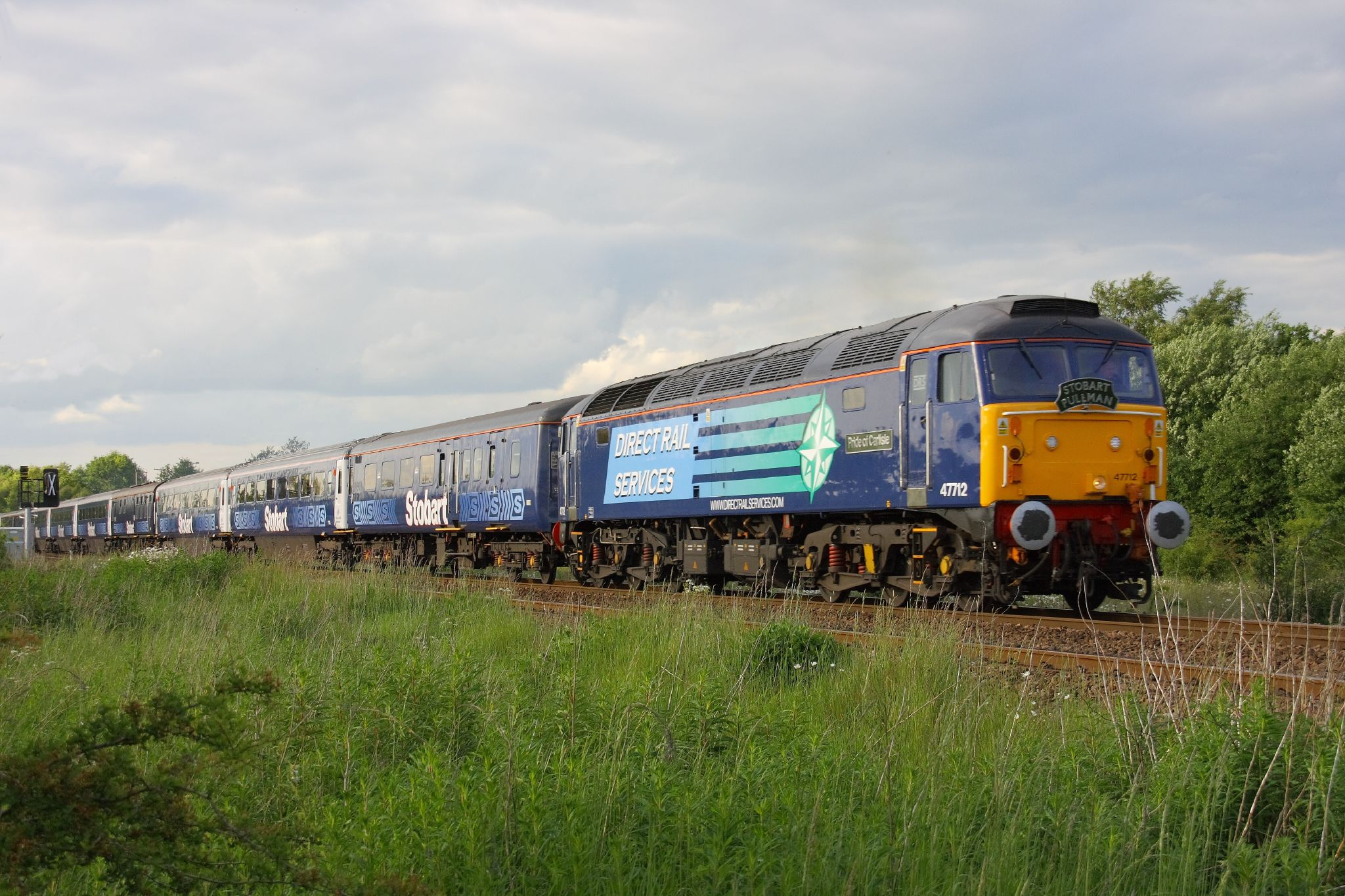
A Stobart Pullman service headed by Pride of Cumbria

The Stobart Pullman was a railtour operator in the United Kingdom, operating pullman type charter trains, as Stobart Rail Tours. The company was a subsidiary of Eddie Stobart Ltd. and was operated by Stobart's rail partner, Direct Rail Services (DRS). On 16 July 2008, the company released a statement on its website that "train operations have been suspended".

== History ==
The Stobart Pullman had its origins in the August 2007 reverse takeover of Eddie Stobart Group by Westbury, which brought the Westbury rail company Victa Westlink Rail into the Stobart Group. Victa Westlink had the railtour company Hertfordshire Rail Tours as a subsidiary. This tour company was rationalised and relaunched as the Stobart Pullman in February 2008, although using rolling stock and traction provided by DRS.

Stobart Pullman headboard

The Pullman was launched with a lunchtime service for 200 people, the Wessex Circular, departing from London Victoria, travelling to Fareham, and returning to London at Euston. This service was run as a top and tailed train, powered by locomotives 47802 Pride of Cumbria and 47712 Pride of Carlisle in DRS compass livery, and a Stobart Pullman headboard.

== Services ==
The Stobart Pullman comprised primarily rail tour charter trains, on circular dining trips and the regular scenic railtour routes, and also trips to specific attractions, and to specific cultural and sporting events, such as Ladies’ Day at Royal Ascot, and the 2008 Open Golf tournament. The Pullman was also used for private hire and corporate transport. The Pullman was operated as a fully first class silver service dining train, with catering provided by Premier Train Catering.

== Fleet ==
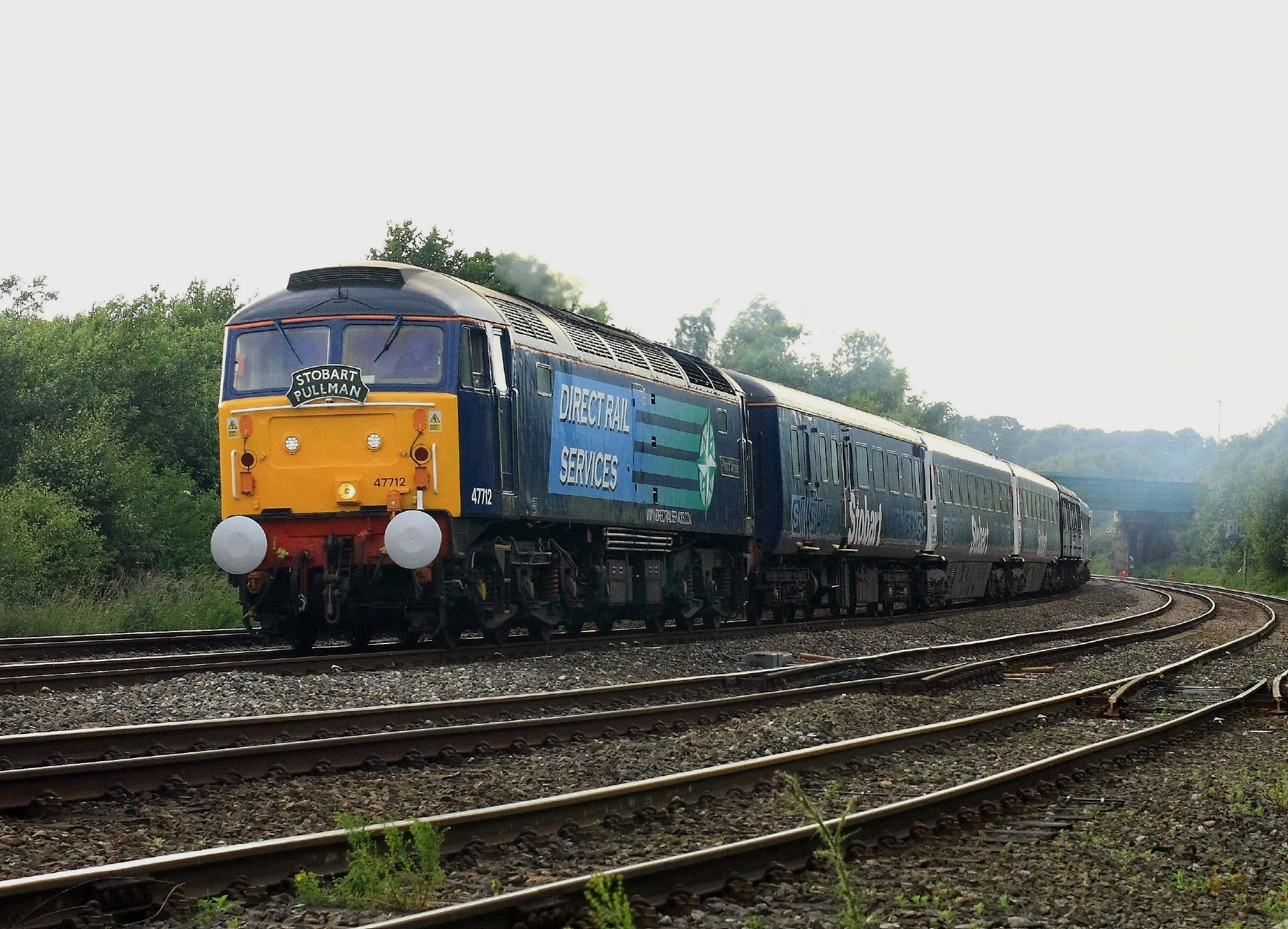
A Stobart Pullman liveried rake of coaches, headed by a DRS liveried Class 47 locomotive number 47712 Pride of Cumbria

The Stobart Pullman drew traction from 5 Class 47 diesel locomotives from the DRS charter pool, repainted into DRS Compass livery. The rolling stock was to First Open (FO) configuration and carried a dark blue Stobart Pullman livery, with Stobart fleetnames and the chevron S Stobart logo. Doors were painted white with the DRS compass logo and wording. The Stobart Pullman crest and wording was applied to the coaches between every other window.

- No. 47501
- No. 47709
- No. 47712 Pride of Carlisle
- No. 47802 Pride of Cumbria
- No. 47832

(47709 and 47832 are to be renamed by DRS from selections forwarded to Rail Express magazine, which closed on 24 March 2008). 47709 and 47712 previously hauled the Blue Pullman train as Dionysos and Artemis, introduced by FM Rail for the Hertfordshire rail tour company.

=== Normal Train Arrangement ===
- DRS Class 47
- DRS Mk3 FO
- DRS Mk3 FO
- DRS Mk1 buffet car
- DRS Mk3 FO
- DRS Mk3 FO
- DRS Mk3 FO
- DRS Mk1 buffet car
- DRS Mk3 FO
- DRS Mk3 FO
- DRS Mk2 brake coach
- DRS Class 47

== See also ==
- List of companies operating trains in the United Kingdom
