= Stobart (logistics company) =

British multimodal logistics company

- Formerly: Eddie Stobart
- Type: Private limited company
- Industry: Logistics
- Founded: 1970
- Founder: Eddie Stobart
- Headquarters: Warrington, England
- Area served: Belgium, Ireland, United Kingdom
- Revenue: £587 million (2022)
- Operating income: £40 million (2022)
- Net income: £7 million (2022)
- Parent: Culina Group
- Website: www.eddiestobart.com

Eddie Stobart Limited is a British multimodal logistics company, with interests in road haulage, rail freight, deep sea and inland waterway transport systems and deep sea port, inland port and rail connected storage facilities, along with transport, handling and warehousing facilities in the United Kingdom, Ireland and Belgium.

Founded by Eddie Stobart at the end of the 1940s as an agricultural business in Cumbria, the company diversified into rail and other activities. It is a subsidiary of the Culina Group, which is in turn a subsidiary of Müller.

== History ==
Former logo

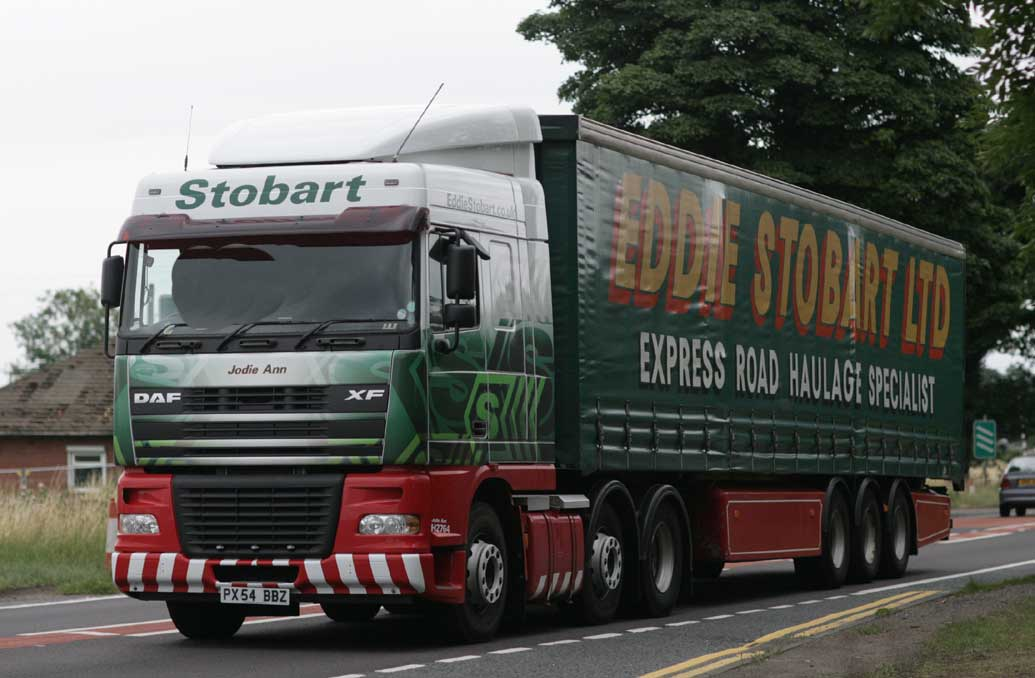
DAF in the previous green, gold and dark red livery in February 2009

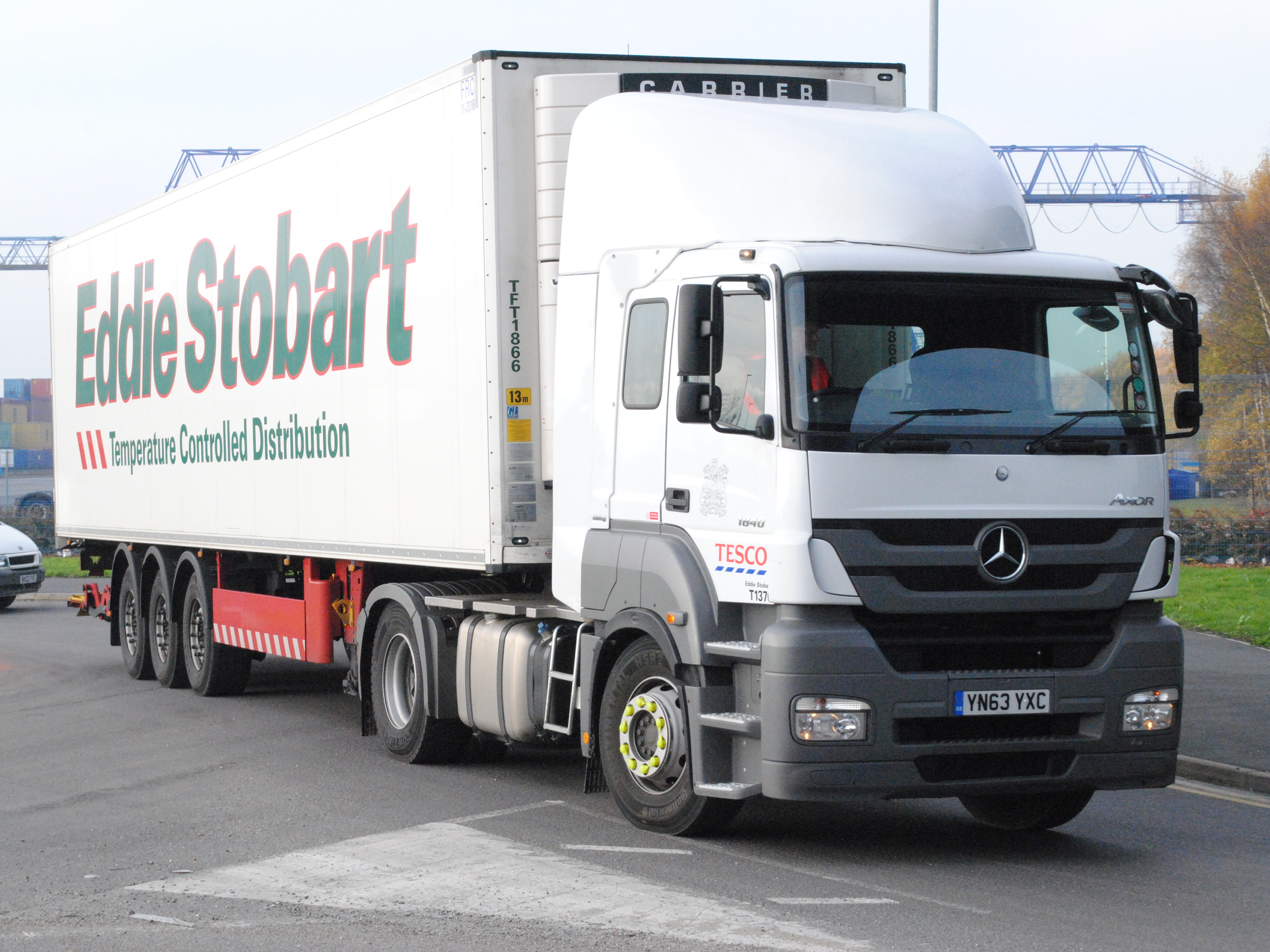
Mercedes-Benz Axor in December 2013

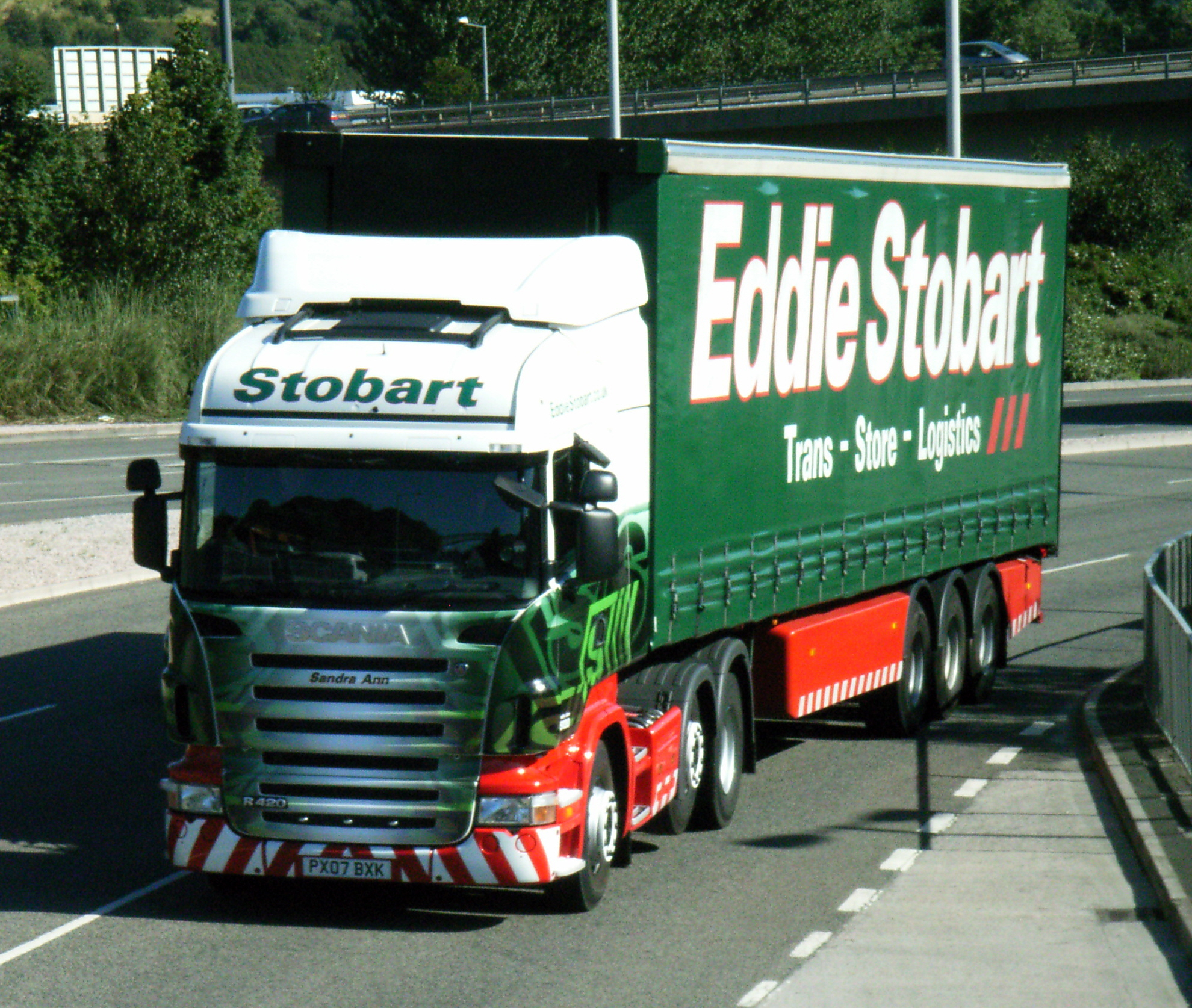
Scania R420 in August 2007

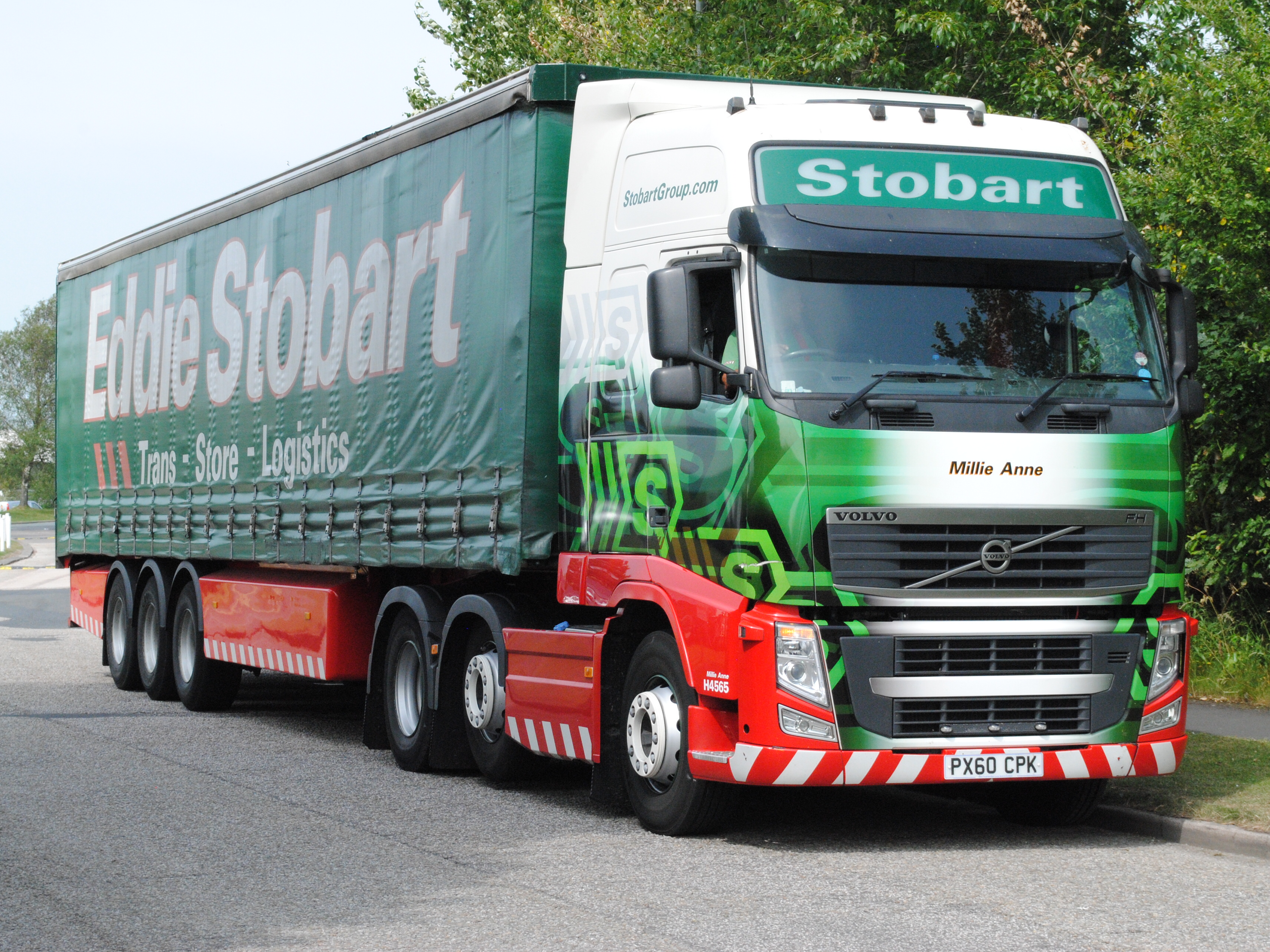
Volvo FH13 in July 2013

The business was started by Eddie Stobart in the late 1940s as an agricultural business in Cumbria. His son, Edward Stobart Junior, started working for his father's contracting business delivering agricultural material in the region. The first truck bought by Eddie Stobart in 1960 was painted post-office red and Brunswick green with yellow lettering. These colours were used for subsequent vehicles up to 1969. The company was incorporated as Eddie Stobart Ltd on 23 November 1970 as a haulage firm, and Eddie Stobart controlled the organisation fully until 1973, when, at the age of 19, Edward Stobart became CEO. In 1976 Eddie retired and Edward took full control of the road haulage business and the name Eddie Stobart Ltd in 1976, becoming Chairman.

By 1985 Edward Stobart owned 26 vehicles. The business was characterised by its Tautliner bodies. In order to maintain brand image, in the 1980s the company had a policy that all drivers must wave back and honk their horn in the traditional truck-driver fashion when signalled by a passer-by or "Eddie spotter" to do so.

On 1 April 1987 the company opened a depot in the English Midlands at Burnaston.

By 2002 the company was experiencing financial difficulties caused by the fuel crisis. In 2001 the haulage business had posted its first loss, with the fan club making more money than the haulage business.

On 15 October 2003 it was announced that Eddie Stobart was to be sold to WA Developments, a civil engineering company that specialised in railway maintenance, based in Appleby-in-Westmorland, Cumbria. At the time Eddie Stobart was 55%-owned by Edward Stobart and 45%-owned by his brother William. WA Developments was 27% owned by William and 73% owned by William's school friend, brother-in-law and business partner Andrew Tinkler. In effect, therefore, William Stobart's stake in Eddie Stobart was reduced from 45% to 27%.

After a series of takeovers the Stobart company developed from a haulage company to a logistics company known as the Stobart Group, obtaining a stock-market listing without an initial public offering through a reverse takeover of the property and ports company the Westbury Property Fund in 2007.

In May 2007, Eddie Stobart was the subject of controversy when it reportedly offered bonuses to its Carlisle-based drivers to work in Livingston in Scotland, to transport goods for Tesco, who were in dispute with their distribution-centre drivers and facing disruption to their supply chain. The Stobart drivers refused to cross the Livingston picket line.

On 10 March 2008, James Irlam Logistics, one of the largest independently owned road transport logistics providers in the UK, was purchased for £60 million.

On 1 April 2008, the company started its first dedicated operations in Ireland, Stobart Ireland, based in Dublin, following the acquisition of TDG's Irish trailer operations.

On 14 September 2009 MP David Taylor opened the firm's Nestlé distribution centre in Bardon, Leicestershire, after a £7 million refurbishment. The new site previously owned by Innovate Logistics. In July 2008 it was announced that the group had taken over the chilled and ambient goods distribution operations from the administrators of Innovate Logistics, saving the jobs of around 1,300 employees.

The company completed the acquisition of Autologic, car-transporter firm, in August 2012.

In March 2014 Stobart Group announced its intention to reposition itself as a support services business, with the announcement of the sale of its original transport and distribution business to DBay Advisors for £281 million: Dbay Advisors secured an indirect 49% stake in the logistics business. However Stobart Group retained the rights to the brand Eddie Stobart, licensing it out to Eddie Stobart Logistics. In December 2019 DBay Advisors increased its indirect stake to 51%.

On 21 May 2020 the company announced that it was acquiring the intellectual property rights to the "Eddie Stobart" and "Stobart" brand names for £10 million from Stobart Group to increase its brand awareness. The deal also included the merchandise business and the Stobart Members Club. In February 2021 Eddie Stobart Logistics changed its name to Logistics Development Group.

In July 2021 Culina Group purchased the business and, in September 2021, Eddie Stobart was rebranded as Stobart.

== Ownership ==
Between 2014 and 2021 the business was either wholly owned or partly owned by an investment entity known as Eddie Stobart Logistics, which changed its name to Logistics Development Group in February 2021. DBAY Advisors (51%) and Logistics Development Group (49%) both sold their shareholdings to Culina Group in July 2021.

== Headquarters ==
The company headquarters are on the Stretton Green Distribution Park, Warrington.

== Business segments ==
=== Eddie Stobart ===
The largest part of the business is the original Eddie Stobart road-haulage business with approximately 2,700 vehicles.

=== Stobart Rail Freight ===
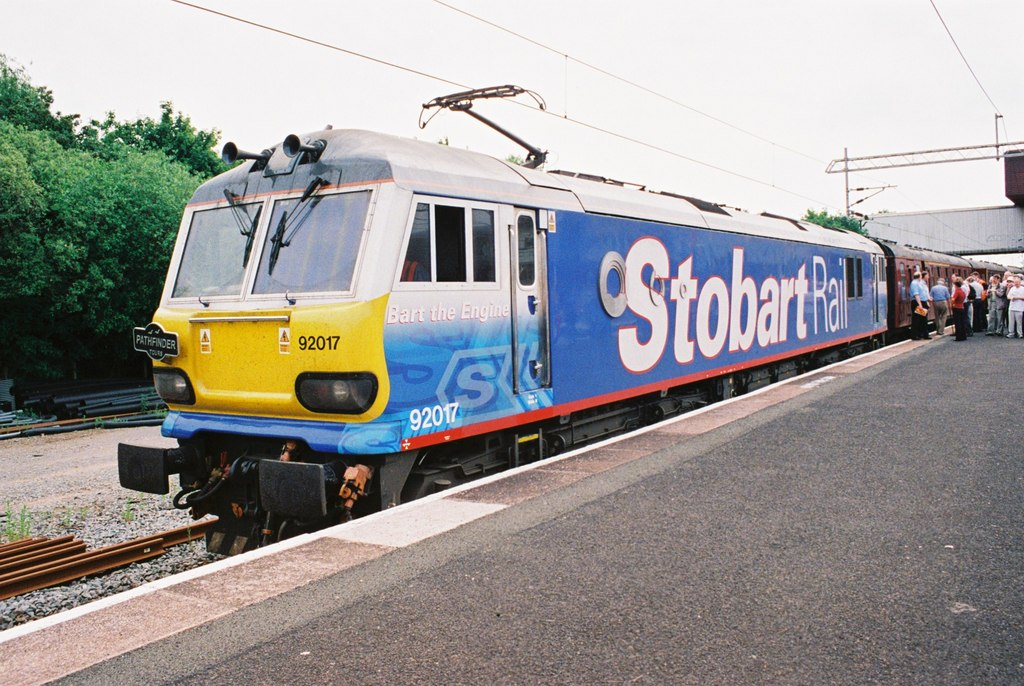
Stobart Rail liveried Class 92 in June 2010

Eddie Stobart provided rail-based services, both for freight as the Stobart Rail service, and (formerly) for passengers. For rail freight transport, the group owns warehousing at the rail connected Daventry International Railfreight Terminal, and owns the rail connected Widnes Intermodal Rail Depot.

=== Stobart Ports ===
O'Connor Group Management Ltd (trading as Stobart Ports) is the ports division. It owns a site in Widnes, Cheshire.

== Vehicle naming ==
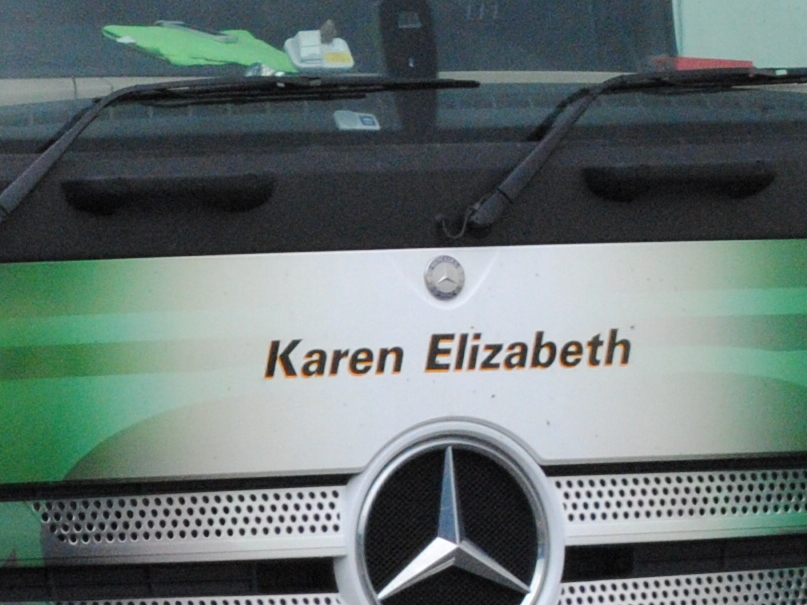
Karen Elizabeth name on a Mercedes-Benz Actros in 2013

Eddie Stobart had a long tradition of giving its trucks female names. The first four owned by Eddie Stobart were named after model "Twiggy" and singers "Tammy" (Wynette), "Dolly" (Parton) and "Suzi" (Quatro). The practice has been expanded to cover other Stobart vehicles, including their sponsored sports cars and the Stobart Rail locomotive "Eddie the Engine".

With the expansion of the fleet, names have become harder to choose, and the fleet now features "Tuula Karina" (Finnish), "Angharad" (Welsh), "Anstice" and "Saoirse Erin" (Irish, meaning 'Free Ireland'). Currently the vehicles with the shortest and longest names are "Nia" and "Gladys Duchess of Overton", both on Scania R420s.

There are some exceptions to the female naming convention (including Eddie the Engine). In 2005, in celebration of twenty years of Transformers, Stobart named a MAN tractor "Optimus Prime" and recently during the filming of a television series entitled Eddie Stobart: Trucks & Trailers a Volvo FH12 was christened "Valentino" after Valentino Rossi, the legendary Italian motorcycle racer, which caused a furore among spotters.

The company has a static Volvo FH in the "Glasshouse" at their Crick depot which is named in honour of fusilier "Lee Rigby".

== Vehicle livery history ==
The first truck bought by Eddie Stobart in 1960 was painted post-office red and Brunswick Green, with yellow lettering. With subsequent vehicles the dark red was changed to a normal red and the dark green to a mixture of dark and bright green.

After the acquisition by Culina Group the livery was changed to white.

== Former operations ==
=== Rail tours ===
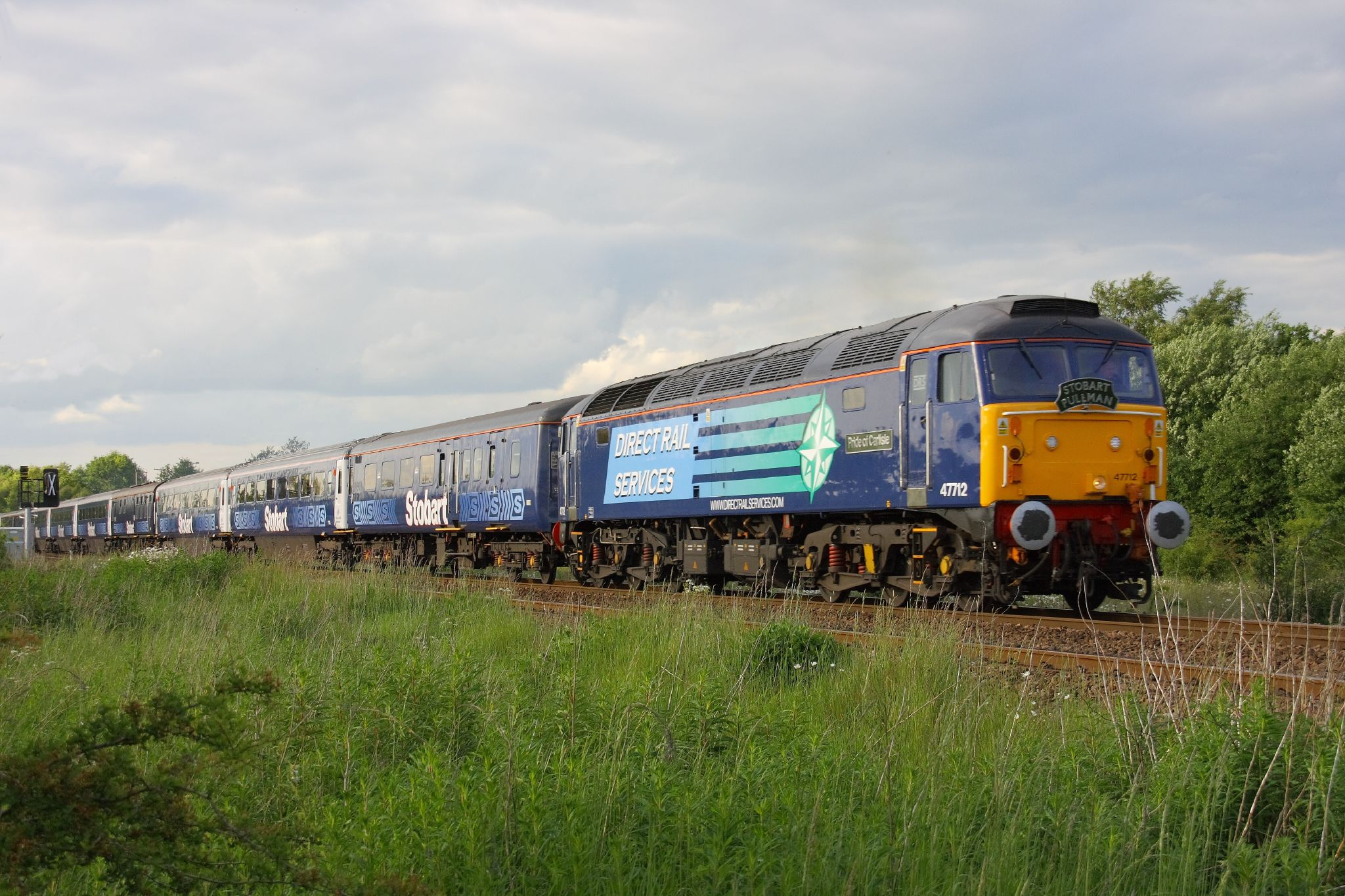
A Stobart Pullman train

The Stobart Group briefly entered the passenger railtour market, through the Stobart Pullman, which was a re-branding of the Hertfordshire Rail Tours business inherited from Victa Westlink Rail, a joint venture between its Westlink subsidiary and Victa Railfreight. Traction was provided by Direct Rail Services using Stobart branded Mark 3 carriages. It was launched in February 2008, ceasing five months later.

=== Fuel ===
The Eddie Stobart fleet included a number of Volvo FM dual-fuel trucks, running primarily on liquid natural gas with diesel as a backup.

== Brand promotion ==
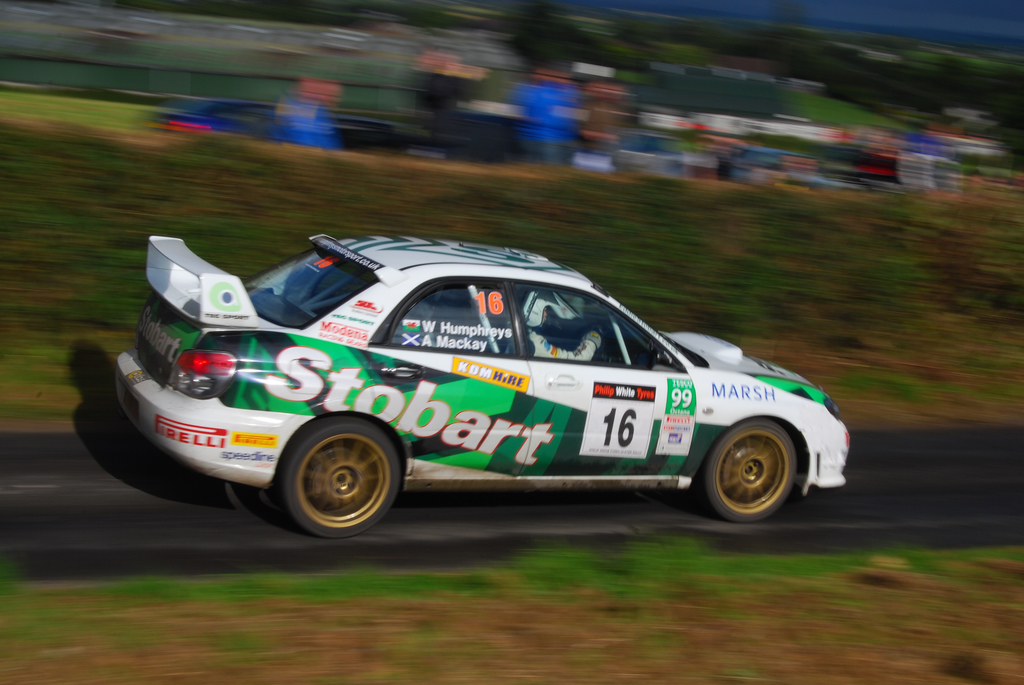
A Subaru Impreza with Stobart sponsorship in September 2007

Eddie Stobart Promotions Ltd have various Brand Promotion services, such as the Stobart Members Club, Stobart Fest, Stobart Sponsorship and Stobart Motorsport. In 2005 and from 2007 to 2016 Eddie Stobart was recognised as a UK Superbrand by Superbrands Ltd.

=== Stobart Members Club ===
The tradition of naming Eddie Stobart tractor units with female names, combined with a very distinctive livery, has led members of the general public to "collect" sightings of Stobart lorries. This has occurred to the extent that a fan club was formed, eventually supported by the company which arranges depot tours and lorry rides, and sells model lorries etc.

=== Sponsorship ===
After the takeover of Eddie Stobart by WA Developments in 2004 and its subsequent listing on the London Stock Exchange in 2007, Stobart took to a high-profile sponsorship programme, including:

- Stobart Stadium Halton, formerly Halton Stadium, the home of Widnes Vikings
- Manor House Stables - yard sponsor, home to racehorse trainer Tom Dascombe
- The Rugby Super League

=== In popular culture ===
Channel 5 and Princess Productions released a programme dedicated to the Stobart group, Eddie Stobart: Trucks & Trailers, which first aired on 24 September 2010.

The Stobart Group was featured on Top Gear in 1995, when presenter Tony Mason visited the company's Carlisle headquarters. Another appearance was made on Top Gear during the Reliant Robin rocket challenge. The Reliant was transported to the launch site on a flatbed Stobart truck to Richard Hammond and James May.

A one-off TV show was produced for ITV4 called Eddie Stobart - Smart Truckers. Narrated by Paddy McGuinness, the show included the boss William Stobart doing deliveries to distribution centres and the firm's race horses.

A Compact disc was produced called Eddie Stobart Trucking Songs. The CD features all the truckers' favourite rock songs and artists including Queen, Fleetwood Mac and Motörhead.

The Somerset-based Scrumpy and Western band The Wurzels recorded a new song, "I wanna be an Eddie Stobart Driver".

In 2001, an animated series titled Steady Eddie was released on home video by Contender Entertainment Group consisting of low-budget animation. It was based on the books by Linda Jennings and features some differences to the original book version (such as the human character designs etc.). The series features characters such as anthropomorphic vehicles: Steady Eddie, the protagonist, Oliver Overdrive, Steady Eddie's arch-rival, Jock the Tanker and Lorretta Lorry, Steady Eddie's friends, and Freddie Forklift, a forklift who works in the yard making deliveries to Steady Eddie.

The characters in the late 1990s were released as toys by Corgi and often contained a small comic storyline seen on the back of the packaging.
