= Andrew Tinkler =

British businessman

- Born: Cumbria, England
- Years active: 1988–current
- Known for: Founder of WA Developments

William Andrew Tinkler (known as Andrew Tinkler) was the chief executive officer of Stobart Group Limited until 1 July 2017.

He lives in Cumbria.

Starting his career as a cabinet maker and glazing fitter in 1988, Tinkler founded WA Tinkler Building Contractor. The business later became WA Developments Limited, focusing on civil engineering contracts for the railway infrastructure sector.

In 2004, WA Developments International Limited, a business owned by Andrew Tinkler and William Stobart, acquired Eddie Stobart. The company later merged with Westbury Property Fund Limited, creating Stobart Group, of which Tinkler became Chief Executive.

In 2011, he was named the CBI North West Business Leader of the Year.

He owned 7.7% of Stobart Group as of May 2018.

Tinkler was replaced by Warwick Brady as CEO of Stobart Group on 1 July 2017 after the company's June AGM, and moved to head the newly formed Stobart Capital. He remained on Stobart Group's board.

Tinkler was fired from the board of Stobart Group in June 2018, accused of "breach of contract and breach of fiduciary duty", losing a subsequent High Court action in February 2019. His later appeal against that decision was rejected in June 2019.
