= Eddie Stobart =

British businessman (1929–2024)

- Born: Edward Pears Stobart; 18 April 1929; Cumberland, England
- Died: 25 November 2024 (aged 95)
- Years active: 1940–1989
- Known for: Founder of Stobart
- Spouse: Nora Boyd (m. 1951)
- Children: 4, including Edward and William

Edward Pears Stobart (18 April 1929 – 25 November 2024) was a British businessman who started an agriculture business in the late 1940s. This became Eddie Stobart Limited in 1970 and expanded to a haulage company during the 1970s with the help of his son Edward Stobart (1954–2011) who gradually took over the running of the company.

== Life and career ==
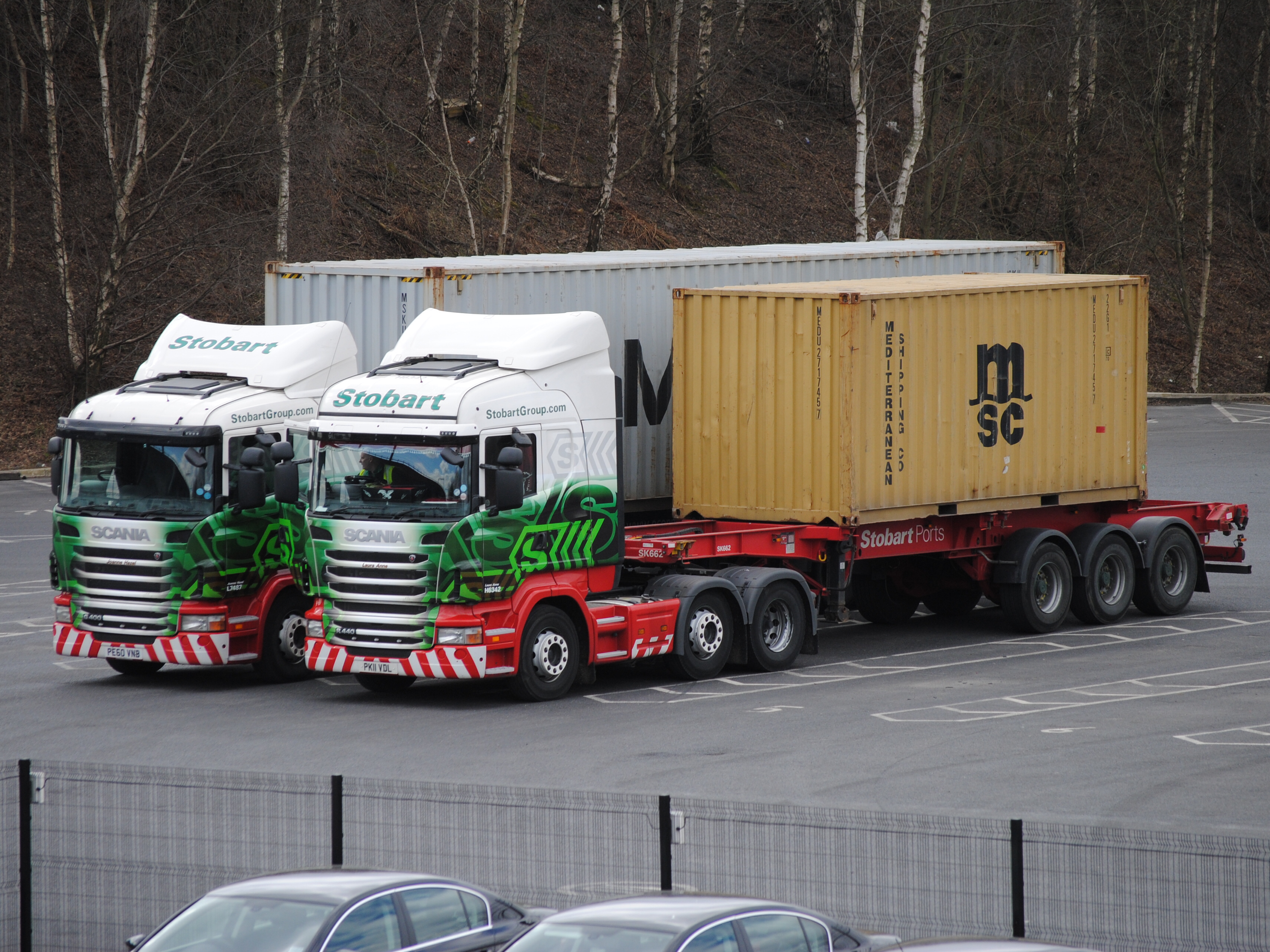
Scania G400 (L7487 Joanne Hazel) and Scania R440 (H6342 Laura Anne)

Stobart was born in Cumberland (now Cumbria) on 18 April 1929 to devout Methodist parents, John and Adelaide. The family farmed a 32-acre (13 ha) smallholding, with eight cows, at Hesket Newmarket, south of Carlisle. His mother died when he was 12 and Stobart left the nearby Howbeck village school at the age of 14.

After leaving school Stobart helped his father on the farm and took occasional horse-and-cart work with Cumberland County Council.

Stobart married Nora Boyd on 26 December 1951 and they lived in Cumberland. They had four children: Anne (born 1952), John (1953–2022), Edward (1954–2011) and William (born 1961). In their later years Nora and Stobart lived at Scotby, in Cumbria.

In 1960 Stobart bought his first lorry (a Guy Invincible four-wheeler truck) second-hand from the local garage and had it repainted in his choice of colours: post office red and Brunswick green. He took over the collection of basic slag (a waste product of steelworks used as fertiliser) when local company Harrison Ivinson went out of business and purchased two Ford Thames Trader trucks, which were also painted in his favourite colours with his logo on the doors. A contract with ICI for storage of basic slag in 1963 enabled expansion of the business and it became a limited company: Eddie Stobart Limited in November 1970 with a share value of £10,000 (equivalent to £137,160 in 2025). In 1978, with a downturn in the economy, Stobart had eight vehicles on the road along with a vehicle leased to Pickervance.

Stobart continued to run the company before his son Edward took over running the transport side in 1976.

Stobart died on 25 November 2024 at the age of 95.
