= Culina Group =

Logistics company based in Shropshire

Culina Group Limited

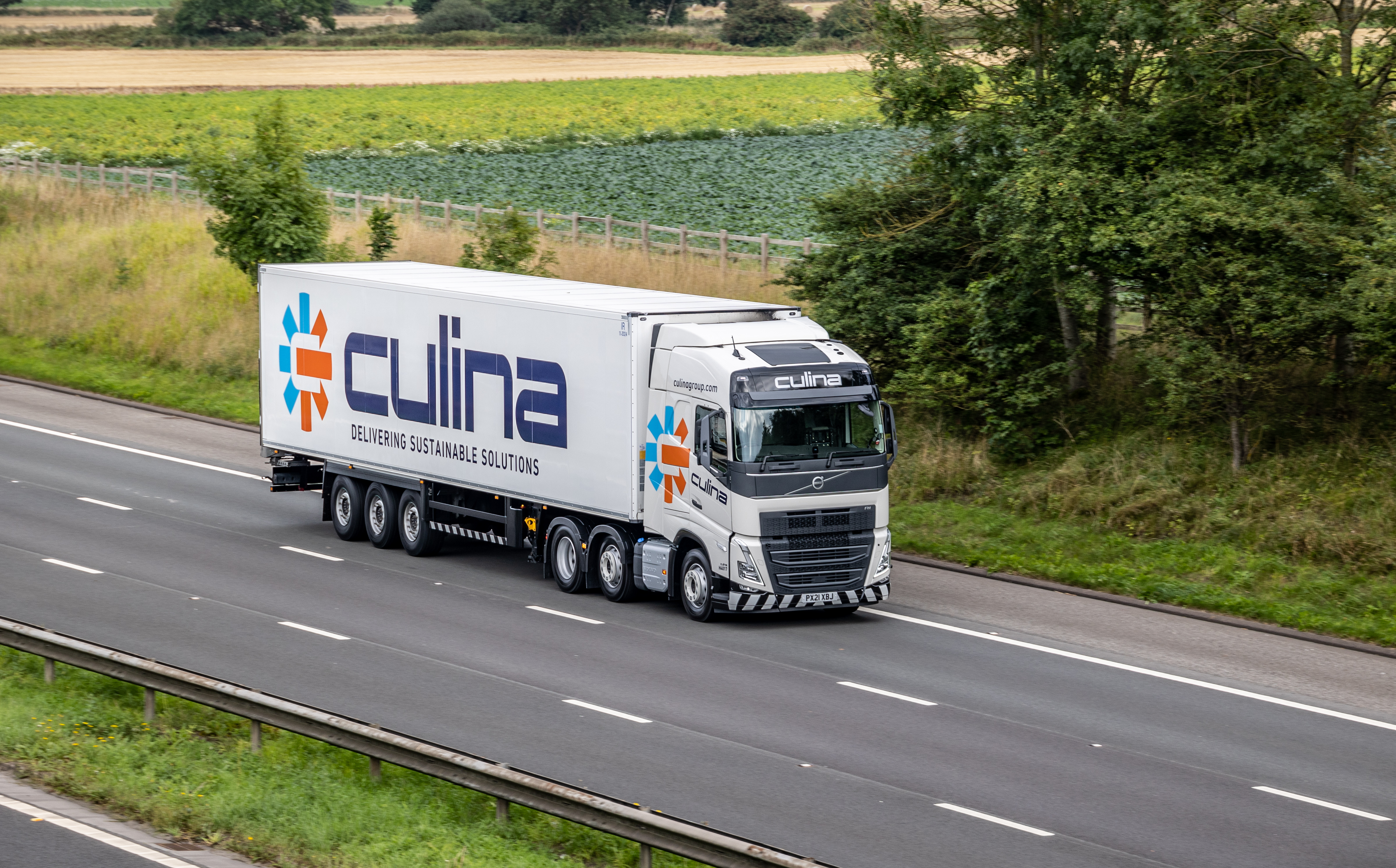
- A Culina vehicle in September 2023
- Company type: Private limited company
- Industry: Transport logistics
- Founded: 1994
- Founder: Thomas van Mourik
- Headquarters: Market Drayton, Shropshire, England
- Area served: United Kingdom, Ireland
- Key people: Liam McElroy (Group CEO); Fabian Koehler (Deputy Group CEO)
- Services: Food and drink logistics, contract packing, haulage
- Revenue: £2.2 billion
- Number of employees: 22,000
- Parent: Müller Group (100%)
- Subsidiaries: Culina Logistics; Fowler Welch; Stobart; Stobart Europe; Great Bear
- Website: www.culina.co.uk

Culina Group Limited is a UK food and drink logistics company with its head office based in Market Drayton, Shropshire. It owns a number of other brands including Eddie Stobart, and is a wholly owned subsidiary of Müller Group.

== History ==
The company was established as a haulage business in Market Drayton in 1994. It merged with Bayliss Transport, a third party logistics operator, in 2008, and acquired Great Bear Distribution in 2016. The business entered into a joint venture with Warren Warehousing Group in 2018 and bought Robsons (of Spalding) in 2018. It then purchased Fowler Welch from Dart Group in June 2020. After that it acquired GreenWhiteStar Acquisitions (the holding company of the Eddie Stobart Group) in July 2021. In April 2024, it was announced Culina Group subsidiary, Stobart Europe had acquired the Mönchengladbach-headquartered automotive logistics company, Suloja Autotransporte GmbH.

== See also ==
- Müller (company)
- Stobart (logistics company)
