= William Stobart =

British businessman

- Born: November 1961 (age 64); Cumberland, England
- Occupation: Deputy Group CEO of Culina Group
- Years active: 1986–2017; 2019–
- Employer: Culina Group Ltd
- Known for: Managing Director of Eddie Stobart Ltd (2004-2007); Chief Operating Officer of Stobart Group (2007-2014); Chief Executive Officer of Eddie Stobart Logistics (2014-2017); Executive Chairman of GreenWhiteStar Acquisitions (2019-2021); Deputy Group CEO of Culina Group (2021-present)
- Spouse: Helen Cleasby (divorced)
- Children: 2
- Parent(s): Eddie Stobart & Nora Stobart
- Family: Edward Stobart, John Stobart, Anne Stobart

William Stobart (born November 1961) is the Deputy Group CEO of Culina Group (owner of Eddie Stobart Limited).

== Career ==
Stobart was born in Cumberland in England in November 1961, the fourth child of Eddie and Nora Stobart. He worked for the family business from his teenage years, joining the management of Eddie Stobart Ltd in 1986. Stobart was Chief Operating Officer of the Stobart Group from 2007 to 2014 and chief executive officer of Eddie Stobart Logistics from 2014 to 2017. He then served as Executive Chairman of GreenWhiteStar Acquisitions from 2019 to 2021 and became Deputy Group CEO of Culina Group in 2021.
