= Esken =

British infrastructure and support services company

Esken Limited
- Formerly: Stobart Group Limited; Westbury Property Fund Limited
- Type: Public limited company
- Traded as: LSE: ESKN
- Industry: Aviation and energy
- Founded: 2002; 24 years ago
- Headquarters: London, England
- Area served: Ireland, United Kingdom
- Key people: David Shearer (Executive Chairman)
- Revenue: ▼£110.7 million (2021)
- Operating income: ▼£(130.0) million (2021)
- Net income: ▼£(155.1) million (2021)
- Divisions: Esken Renewables Limited; London Southend Airport Company Limited; Star Handling Limited; Carlisle Lake District Airport Limited
- Website: www.esken.com

Esken Limited (LSE: ESKN), formerly Stobart Group Limited, is a British infrastructure, aviation and energy company, with operations in the United Kingdom and Ireland. The company is registered in Guernsey but has its operational head office in London, England.

The company originally started in January 2002 as the Westbury Property Fund Limited, a closed-ended real-estate investment fund. In August 2006, realising that property prices were reaching the peak of the market, the Westbury Property Fund decided to re-position its portfolio towards the logistics sector, buying Weston Point Docks in Runcorn, AHC Warehousing and the rail operations of Victa Westlink Rail in March 2007. It then agreed an asset swap deal in August 2007 with the privately owned investment company WA Developments, whereby Westbury would sell 90% of its non-logistics related property portfolio to WA Developments in return for its Eddie Stobart Ltd subsidiary. Eddie Stobart Chairman Andrew Tinkler became CEO, whilst his brother-in-law, the Managing Director William Stobart became COO of the renamed Stobart Group, which subsequently diversified into other sectors. After boardroom changes in 2013, in 2014 a 51% stake in its original transport business was sold, becoming Eddie Stobart Logistics with William Stobart as its CEO. The Group retained the rights to the brand Eddie Stobart, licensing it out to the new company. With Andrew Tinkler remaining CEO at Stobart Group, it re-positioned itself around its remaining interests. In June 2018, Andrew Tinkler left the company and in May 2020, Stobart Group announced the sale of the Eddie Stobart and Stobart brand names to Eddie Stobart Logistics, requiring it to change its corporate name by February 2021. In January 2021, Stobart Group announced that following shareholder approval, it would change its name to "Esken Limited" in February 2021.

The company was listed on the London Stock Exchange. However, unlike most UK public companies, the company retained its "Ltd" status as it is incorporated in Guernsey and not England & Wales, Scotland or Northern Ireland, which would require it to change its suffix to "plc" status.

The company went into administration on 21 March 2024.

== History ==
=== Lead-up ===
The company started out as the Westbury Property Fund Limited, a closed ended real estate investment fund based in Guernsey established in January 2002 by Investment Manager Richard Burrell. In August 2006, realising that property prices were reaching the peak of the market, the Westbury Property Fund decided to re-position its portfolio towards the logistics sector, by buying Weston Point Docks in Runcorn, AHC Warehousing and the rail operations of Victa Westlink Rail in March 2007.

=== Reverse takeover by Eddie Stobart ===
The company was created on 15 August 2007 when the Westbury Property Fund entered into a reverse acquisition by the Eddie Stobart Logistics business, which enabled Eddie Stobart Logistics to gain a stock market listing. Westbury acquired the ultimate Eddie Stobart Ltd holding company, Stobart Holdings Ltd, from W.A. Developments International Ltd for £137.7 million: £62 million in cash and £76 million in new Westbury Property Fund shares. The renamed Westbury group then became the London Stock Exchange listed Stobart Group Ltd, with Andrew Tinkler and William Stobart becoming substantial shareholders holding 20% and 8.5% respectively of the Stobart Group. In return, Westbury sold the bulk of its commercial property portfolio, Westbury Properties Ltd., to another WA Developments subsidiary, WADI Properties Ltd., for £142.0 million in cash, thereby retaining the assets under the control of Andrew Tinkler and William Stobart (the owners of WA Developments), while being outside the new group.

The enlarged Stobart Group diversified into other sectors, making acquisitions including WA Developments Ltd from W A Developments Holdings Ltd in 2008, London Southend Airport in 2008, Carlisle Lake District Airport in 2009 and 50% of A. W. Jenkinson Biomass Ltd in 2010.

On 21 April 2011, the Group announced a Placing and Open Offer (similar to a rights issue) of 77,339,766 new ordinary shares in the Stobart Group at 155p each to raise net proceeds of £114.9 million. The Group also announced it was buying the remaining 50% of Stobart Biomass Products it did not already own for £20 million.

In January 2012, the Group announced it was buying back its former commercial property portfolio which it sold to WA Developments in 2007, by acquiring WADI Properties Ltd for £12.35 million.

=== Boardroom coup and counter-coup ===
In January 2013, following an under-performing share price, Stobart Group's largest shareholder, Invesco, initiated a number of boardroom changes. The Non-Executive Chairman, Rodney Baker-Bates, was demoted to Non-Executive Director, whilst Avril Palmer-Baunack, the former Chief Executive of Autologic and now Deputy Chief Executive of Stobart Group, was promoted to Executive Chairman. Her remit was to sell off under-performing parts of the business.

In April 2013, Stobart Group announced that Palmer-Baunack would be leaving the Group in the next month. In October 2013, Stobart Group appointed Iain Ferguson CBE as independent Non-Executive Chairman.

=== Partial realisation of Transport and Distribution Division ===
In March 2014, the group announced its intention to re-position itself as an Infrastructure and Support Services business, with the sale of its main transport and distribution business to Douglas Bay Capital for £280.8 million: £195.6 million in cash and £44.1 million in shares (and therefore a 49% stake) of the new Eddie Stobart logistics business. The deal enabled the group to pay back almost all of its debt, conduct a £35 million share buy-back and invest £55 million into its new division, Stobart Green Energy. At the same time William Stobart left his position as Chief Operating Officer of the Stobart Group to become Executive Chairman of Eddie Stobart Logistics.

On 11 May 2017, it was announced that Warwick Brady would become the Group CEO from the June AGM, with Andrew Tinkler remaining as an Executive Board Member and also heading up Stobart Capital, a new venture independent of the Stobart Group. On Thursday 14 June 2018, it was announced that Stobart Group had removed its executive director and former Chief Executive Andrew Tinkler from its board of directors.

=== Rationalisation ===
On 13 January 2020, Andrew Tinkler sold his remaining 4.975% shareholding in the company. Also on 13 January 2020, Toscafund announced that it owned 11.70% of the Stobart Group, this was subsequently increased to 18.8%.

On 21 May 2020, the firm announced that it had sold the intellectual property rights to the "Eddie Stobart" and "Stobart" brand names for £10 million to Eddie Stobart Logistics to end confusion with its investors. This means that the Stobart Group would change its corporate name by 28 February 2021. It did not reveal whether it was going to revert to its original name Westbury or would adopt an entirely new name.

On 4 June 2020, the firm announced another Placing and Open Offer consisting of 200,046,312 Firm Placed Shares and 49,953,688 Open Offer Shares at 40p each to raise gross proceeds of £100 million to provide additional liquidity and to enable its Aviation division to deliver on its long-term strategic ambitions. As a result of this, the group's largest shareholder Toscafund Asset Management, would increase its shareholding to 27.56%. It also announced that as a result of concentrating on its airports and aviation services businesses, it had decided to divest all its non-core assets to raise further cash, by selling its remaining stake in Eddie Stobart Logistics, and Stobart Air, Propius, Stobart Rail & Civils, Stobart Energy and all its remaining non-core commercial properties.

Stobart Group Ltd confirmed the sale of Stobart Rail & Civils to Bavaria Industries Group AG on 14 July 2020, for an initial cash consideration of £1,000.

=== Becoming Esken Limited ===
Stobart Group confirmed on 11 January 2021 that, subject to shareholder approval, it would change its name to "Esken Limited" (meaning 'to ascend, to climb and to rise'; related to the Latin ascendo and the modern Welsh esgyn on 3 February 2021. The group had sold the "Eddie Stobart" and "Stobart" trademarks to Eddie Stobart Logistics, in May 2020, for £10m.

In April 2021, it was announced that Stobart Air and Carlisle Lake District Airport would be sold to Isle of Man-based company Ettyl, with Esken retaining its aviation activities at London Southend Airport. However, the deal fell through after Stobart Air entered liquidation.

London Southend Airport was sold to the US Private Equity corporation Carlyle in March 2024 in a deal which led to Esken delisting from the London Stock Exchange.

After the company's restructuring plan was found to be "no longer commercially viable", the business went into administration on 21 March 2024.

== Financial performance ==
Figures below show the recent results for the Group; the financial year runs to the last day of February each year:

Period ended	Turnover (£m)	Profit before tax (£m)	Adjusted earnings per share diluted (p)
28 February 2021	110.7	(150.3)	(28.8)
29 February 2020	170.2	(158.0)	(37.4)
28 February 2019	146.9	(42.1)	(16.6)
28 February 2018	242.0	100.6	28.7
28 February 2017	129.4	(8.0)	(2.67)
29 February 2016	126.7	10.0	2.68
28 February 2015	116.6	(9.4)	(2.43)
28 February 2014	99.2	(10.2)	(3.06)
28 February 2013	572.4	36.0	8.98
29 February 2012	551.92	30.55	8.97
28 February 2011	500.39	29.47	9.02
28 February 2010	447.66	33.29	11.58
28 February 2009	431.06	29.72	(4.07)
29 February 2008 (14 months)	108.84	3.52	(22.92)
31 December 2006	0.42	(1.12)	58.29
31 December 2005	7.59	13.70	26.48
31 December 2004	5.43	7.56	54.04

== Current operations ==
=== Aviation ===
==== London Southend Airport ====
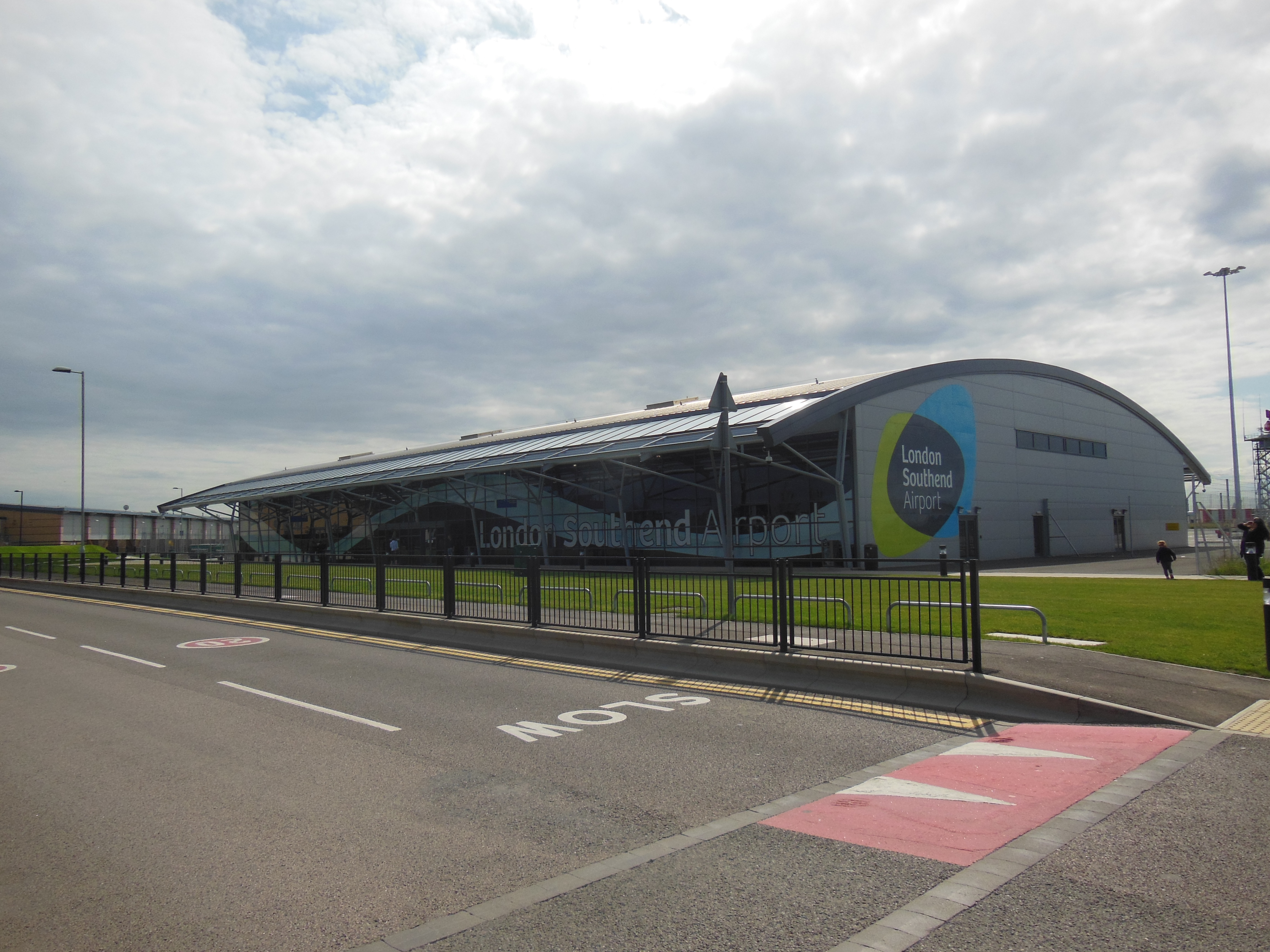
New London Southend Airport terminal building

On 2 December 2008, Stobart Group announced the surprise £21 million purchase of London Southend Airport, through its subsidiary Stobart Airports Ltd from Regional Airports Ltd (who also own London Biggin Hill Airport). The deal completed on 5 December 2008. At the time, the book value of London Southend Airport's assets were £25.5 million, and the acquisition was later described as a "bargain purchase" by the Stobart Group. The deal was paid as to £10 million in new Stobart Group shares, £6 million by a vendor loan note, and the remaining £5 million was to be paid on the completion of the London Southend Airport expansion plans in July 2012.

In June 2023, Esken confirmed it had put London Southend Airport up for sale. It was purchased by Carlyle in March 2024.

==== Carlisle Lake District Airport ====
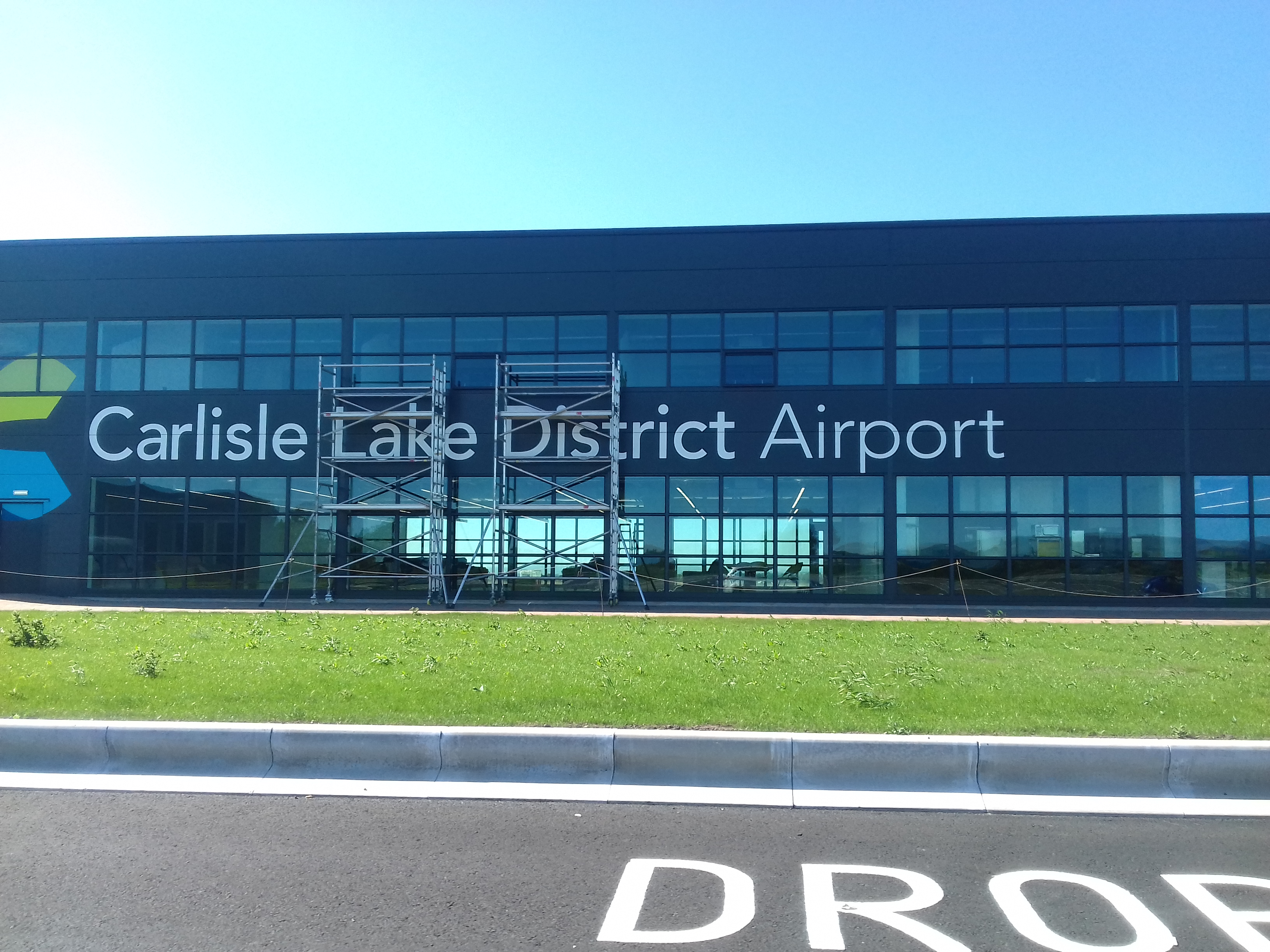
The company's Carlisle office is located in the Carlisle Lake District Airport terminal building

In 2006, Stobart had also been considering expanding into the air freight business. On 7 April 2006 Haughey Airports Ltd – the company which operated Carlisle Airport – was acquired by Eddie Stobart's parent company WA Developments, through a subsidiary company Stobart Air Holdings Ltd. Haughey Airports Ltd was then renamed Stobart Air Ltd. After the reverse takeover in 2007, the Stobart Air operation remained outside the enlarged Stobart Group, i.e. it was still owned by WA Developments. The March 2008 purchase by the group of W. A. Developments Ltd included a £50,000 option agreement to purchase the airport, controlled by WA Developments through Stobart Air Holdings.

In January 2009, Stobart Group's subsidiary, Stobart Airports Ltd, exercised its option to acquire Carlisle Lake District Airport from Stobart Air Holdings for £14 million (£1 million less than originally announced). Following an independent shareholder vote, the acquisition was completed in May 2009, and the purchase price was reduced to £9.9 million due to a fall in the value of Stobart Group shares.

In April 2021, Isle of Man based Ettyl Ltd announced it had agreed to purchase Carlisle Airport, together with airline Stobart Air, from Esken. However, the transaction fell through two months later due to funding issues.

== Former operations ==
=== Eddie Stobart Logistics ===
Stobart Investments included the group's remaining 11.8% stake in the Eddie Stobart Logistics business, a multi-modal logistics company operating across the road, rail and ports sectors, which between 2007 and 2014 was Stobart Group's main operation, when it was a wholly owned subsidiary.

=== Stobart Air ===
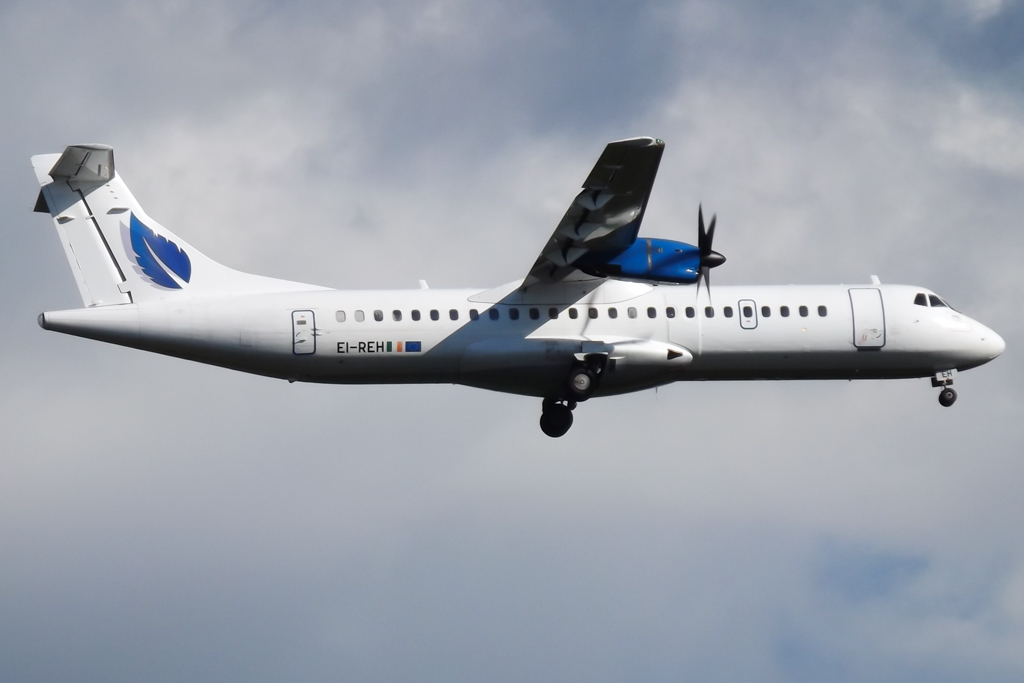
Stobart Air ATR 72

On 11 October 2010, the Stobart Group announced that it was purchasing 35 convertible preference shares of €1 each in the parent company of the Irish airline Aer Arann, Everdeal Ltd, through its subsidiary Aer Arann UK Ltd, for €2.5 million, enabling it to have a 5% stake in the airline. Stobart Group had an option to increase its stake by a further 27.5% to 32.5%. At the same time, Aer Arann announced that it would start twice daily flights from Stobart Group's London Southend Airport to Galway and Waterford in Ireland from 27 March 2011.

On 24 February 2017 Stobart Group completed 100% acquisition of Stobart Air, after purchasing the remaining 19% of Everdeal Holdings. Stobart Group also completed 100% ownership of Propius Holdings Ltd, the aircraft leasing firm through which many of the Stobart Air aircraft are sourced. In February 2018, it was reported that Stobart was considering purchasing 100% of Flybe for whom it operated flights from London Southend.

On 11 January 2019, the Connect Airways consortium formed by Stobart Aviation and Virgin Atlantic announced a takeover bid for Flybe. The consortium initially lent £20 million to enable Flybe to continue operations, and also took over Stobart Air; after the acquisition completed it provided a further £80 million. The consortium's aim was to combine Flybe and Stobart Air with Virgin Atlantic to create an integrated carrier operating under the Virgin Atlantic brand. Flybe and Stobart Air would have however retained their own Air Operator Certificates and Stobart Air's other wet lease operations and its aircraft leasing business would have continued unchanged. Flybe's operating assets were transferred to Connect Airways on 21 February 2019, despite a last-minute rival bid.

On 18 March 2020, Connect Airways entered administration.

On 27 April 2020, Stobart Group bought back Stobart Air and Propius Leasing from Connect Airways administrators EY, for an initial payment of £300,000 and deferred consideration that could total £8.25 million.

In April 2021, Isle of Man-based company Ettyl reached an agreement to buy Stobart Air and Carlisle Lake District Airport. At the end of May, it emerged that Ettyl's intended financing had not materialised, postponing completion of the deal. Stobart Air was closed and began liquidation in June 2021.

=== Moneypenny Property Portfolio ===
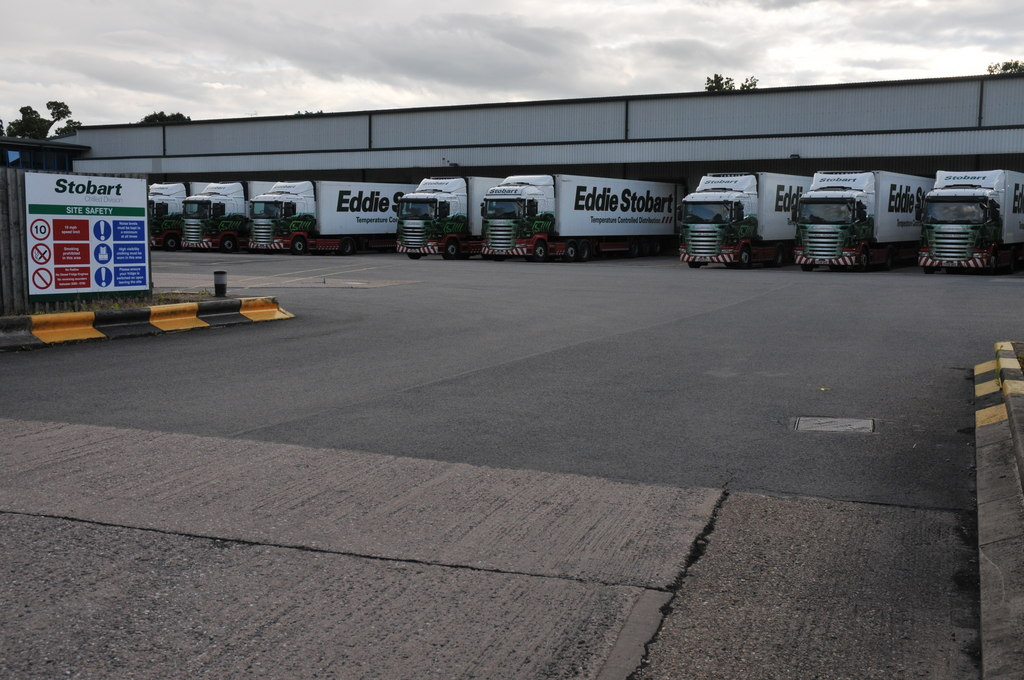
Stobart Chilled distribution depot

The Moneypenny Property Portfolio comprises the company's portfolio of properties, including retail sites, light industrial buildings and distribution centres, office space and holdings which are owned or used in the Group's day-to-day business. It also includes WADI Properties Ltd. In return for the reverse takeover deal in 2007 which saw Westbury become the new Stobart Group, Westbury sold the bulk of its commercial property portfolio, Westbury Properties Ltd., to another WA Developments subsidiary, WADI Properties Ltd., for £142.0 million in cash, thereby enabling these assets to also be controlled by Andrew Tinkler and William Stobart (the owners of WA Developments), while being outside the new group. Westbury Properties Ltd, owned Moneypenny Ltd, (known as the Moneypenny Property Portfolio) at the time comprised 18 freehold and long leasehold properties, a mixture of commercial, industrial and residential properties primarily in the South-East. Because of a fall in property values during 2007–2011, the Stobart Group also announced an option to buy back Westbury Properties Ltd. from WADI Properties Ltd. expiring on 15 August 2011, as some of its properties, owned by a Westbury Properties Ltd. subsidiary, Moneypenny Ltd., were used by the Stobart Group for its operations. On 17 January 2012, Stobart Group announced it was purchasing WADI Properties Ltd. itself for £12.35 million (£5.15 million in cash and £7.2 million in new Stobart Group ordinary shares) from W. A. Developments International Ltd. Following another independent shareholder vote, the acquisition was completed on 28 February 2012.

=== Connect Airways ===
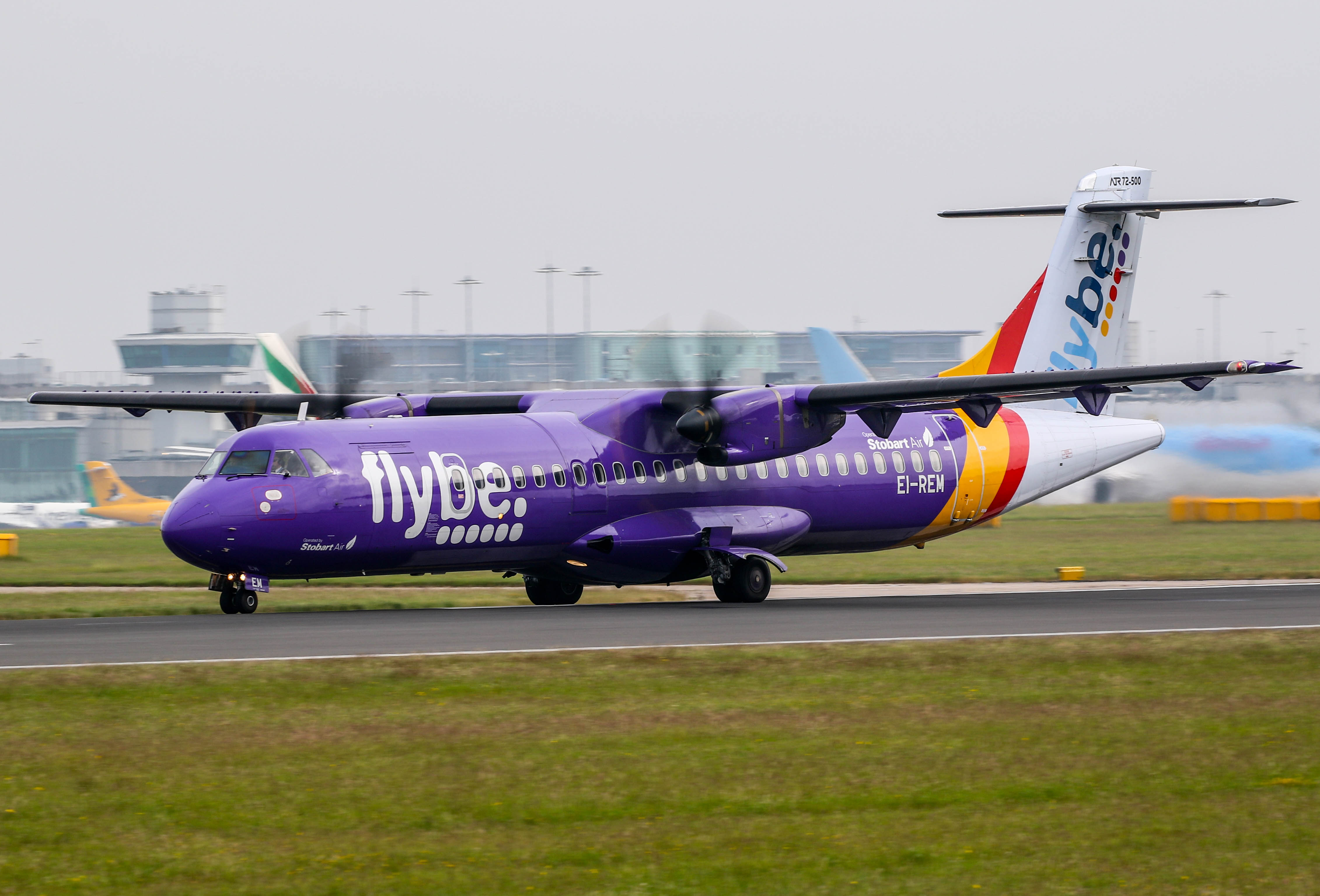
A Flybe ATR 72-500 (operated by Stobart Air)

On 11 January 2019, the Connect Airways consortium formed by Stobart Aviation and Virgin Atlantic announced a takeover bid for Flybe. The consortium will initially lend £20 million to enable Flybe to continue operations, and will also take over Stobart Air; after the acquisition is complete it will provide a further £80 million. The consortium's aim is to combine Flybe and Stobart Air with Virgin Atlantic to create an integrated carrier operating under the Virgin Atlantic brand. Flybe and Stobart Air would however retain their own Air Operator Certificates and Stobart Air's other wet lease operations and its aircraft leasing business would continue unchanged. On 15 January 2019, Connect Airways announced an increased offer, which Flybe's board accepted. Flybe's operating assets were transferred to Connect Airways on 21 February 2019, despite a last-minute rival bid.

On 5 March 2020, the consortium was unable to commit further financial support and Flybe entered administration, ceasing all operations. On 18 March 2020, Connect Airways in turn entered administration.

=== Stobart Rail & Civils ===
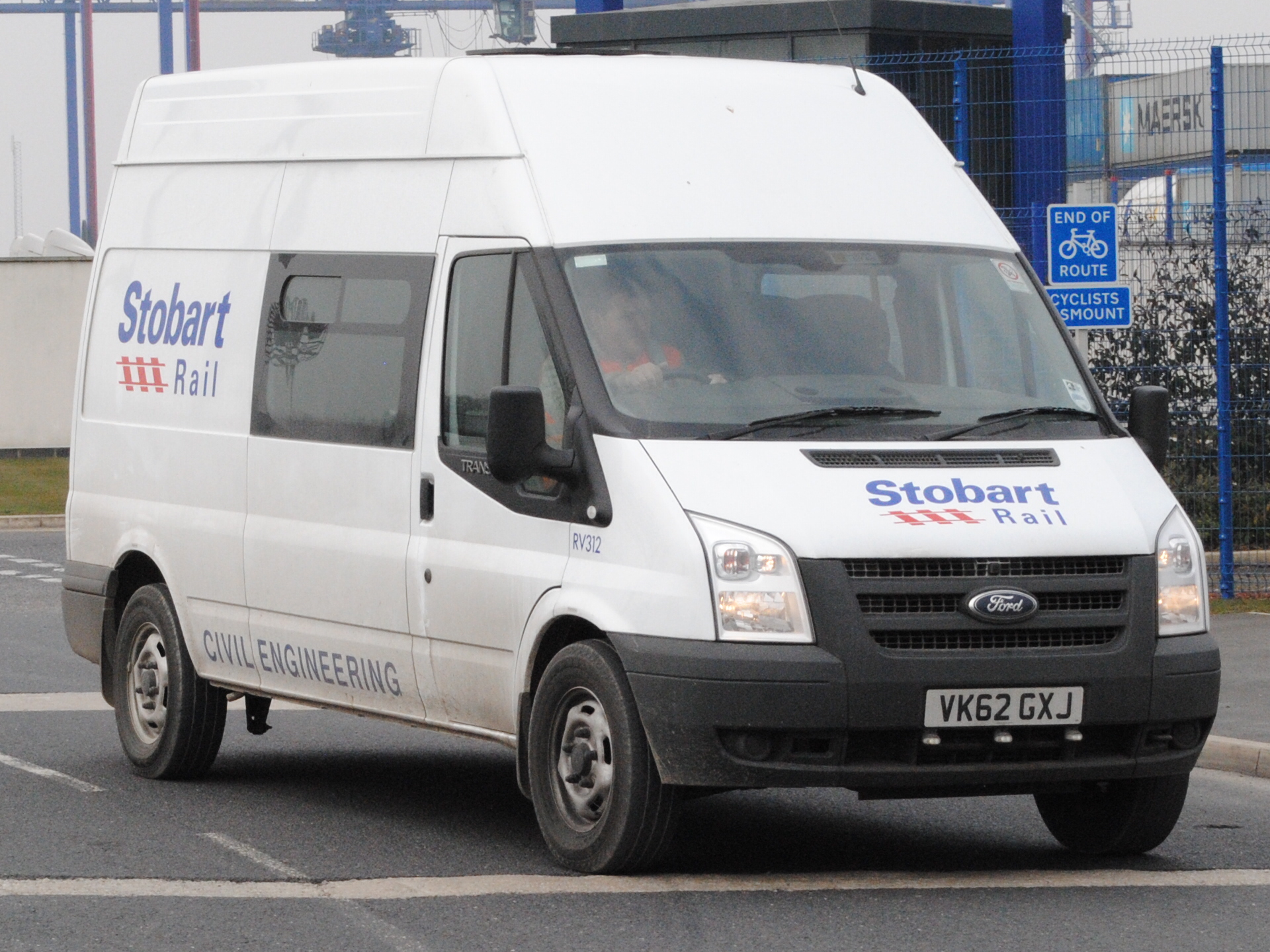
Stobart Rail Civil Engineering Ford Transit van

On 10 March 2008 the Stobart Group acquired W. A. Developments Ltd from W. A. Developments International Ltd, for £15 million (£2.5 million in cash and £12.5 million in new Stobart Group shares).

At the beginning of June 2008, W. A. Developments Ltd. was renamed Stobart Rail Ltd and became responsible for all the railway maintenance and infrastructure activities of the group. Stobart Rail operates the Southend Airport railway station which it opened on 18 July 2011.

On 14 July 2020, the Stobart Group Ltd confirmed the sale of Stobart Rail & Civils to Bavaria Industries Group AG for an initial cash consideration of £1,000.

=== Teesside International Airport ===
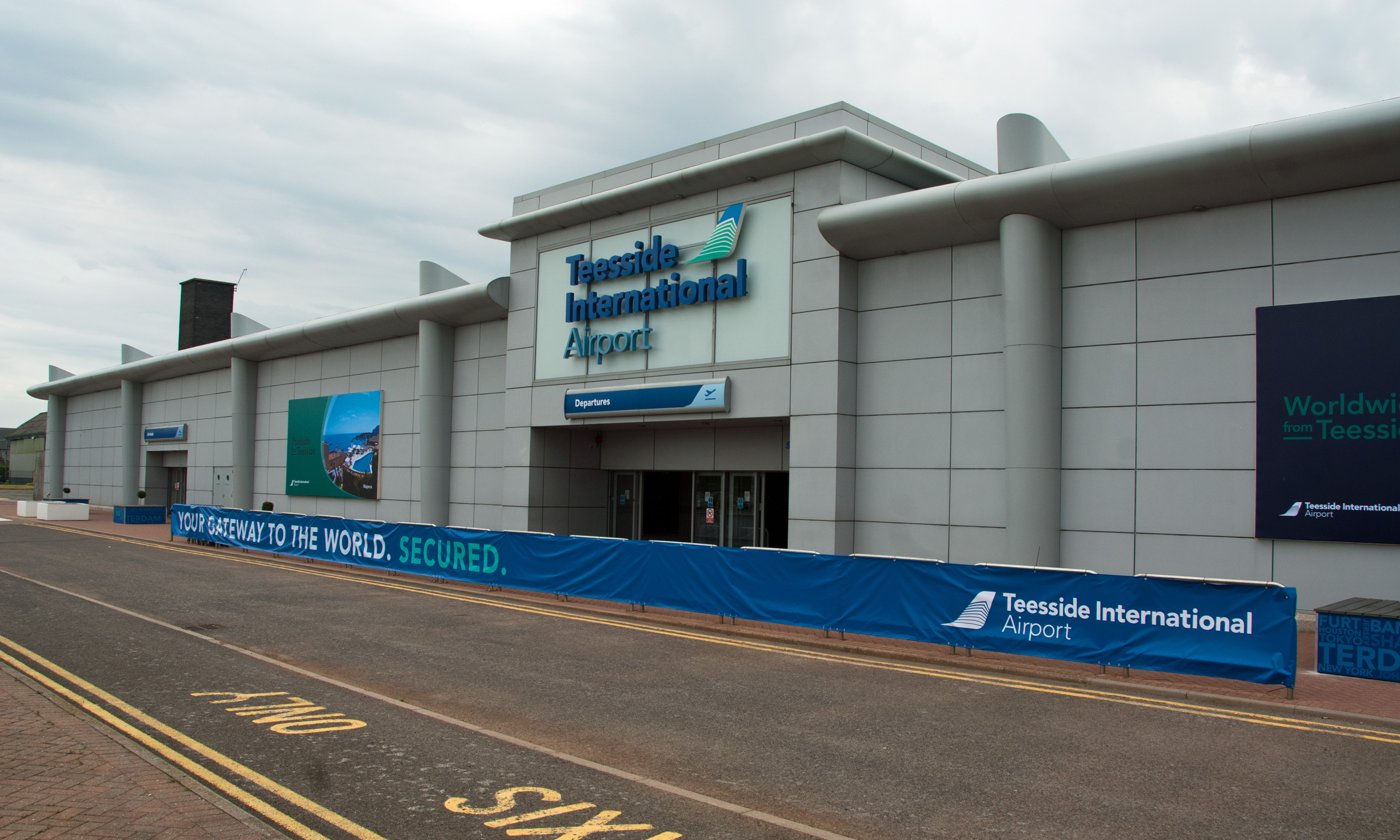
Teesside Airport Terminal

On 14 March 2019, the Mayor of the Tees Valley, Ben Houchen, who in January 2019 brought Durham Tees Valley Airport back into public ownership, unveiled Stobart Aviation as the new operators of the airport. Stobart manage the airport on behalf of the Tees Valley Combined Authority and invested in a 25% stake in the new airport company. The airport reverted to its previous name of Teesside International Airport in July 2019.

=== Star Handling ===
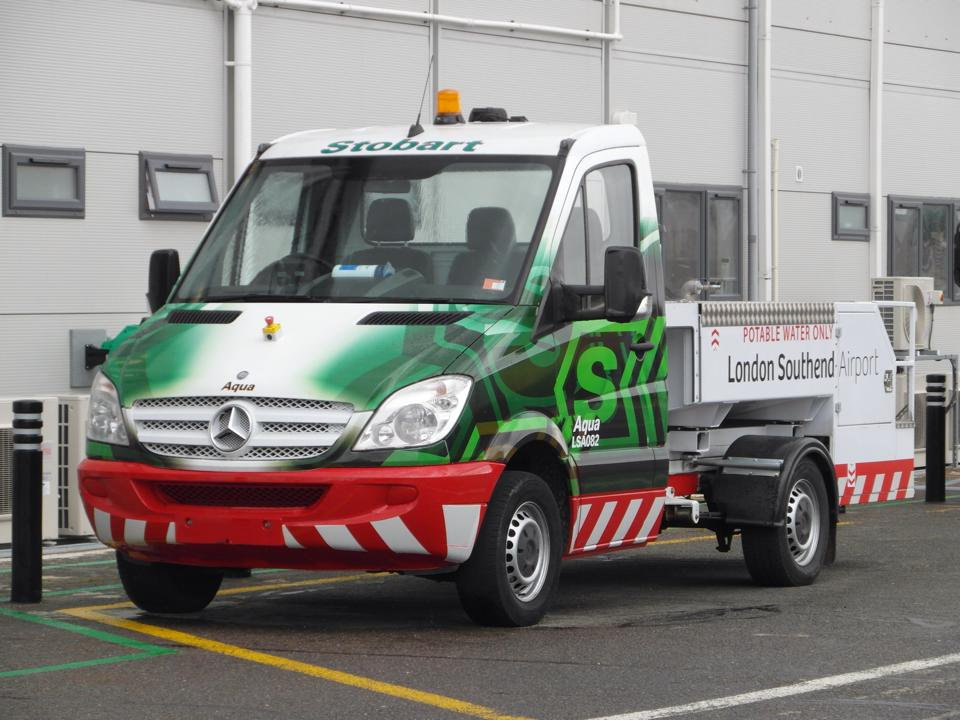
Stobart Aviation London Southend Airport Mercedes-Benz "Aqua" van

Star Handling (formerly Stobart Aviation Services) offers landside and airside services to time critical logistics operations, whilst working alongside airline partners and airports. It has operations at London Stansted Airport, Manchester Airport and London Southend Airport. In May 2023, Esken announced they had completed the disposal of Star Handling to a subsidiary of Prime Flight Aviation Services for £3.46 million, with a further £1.34 million payable based upon the business meeting its revenue forecasts over the following year.

=== Esken Renewables ===
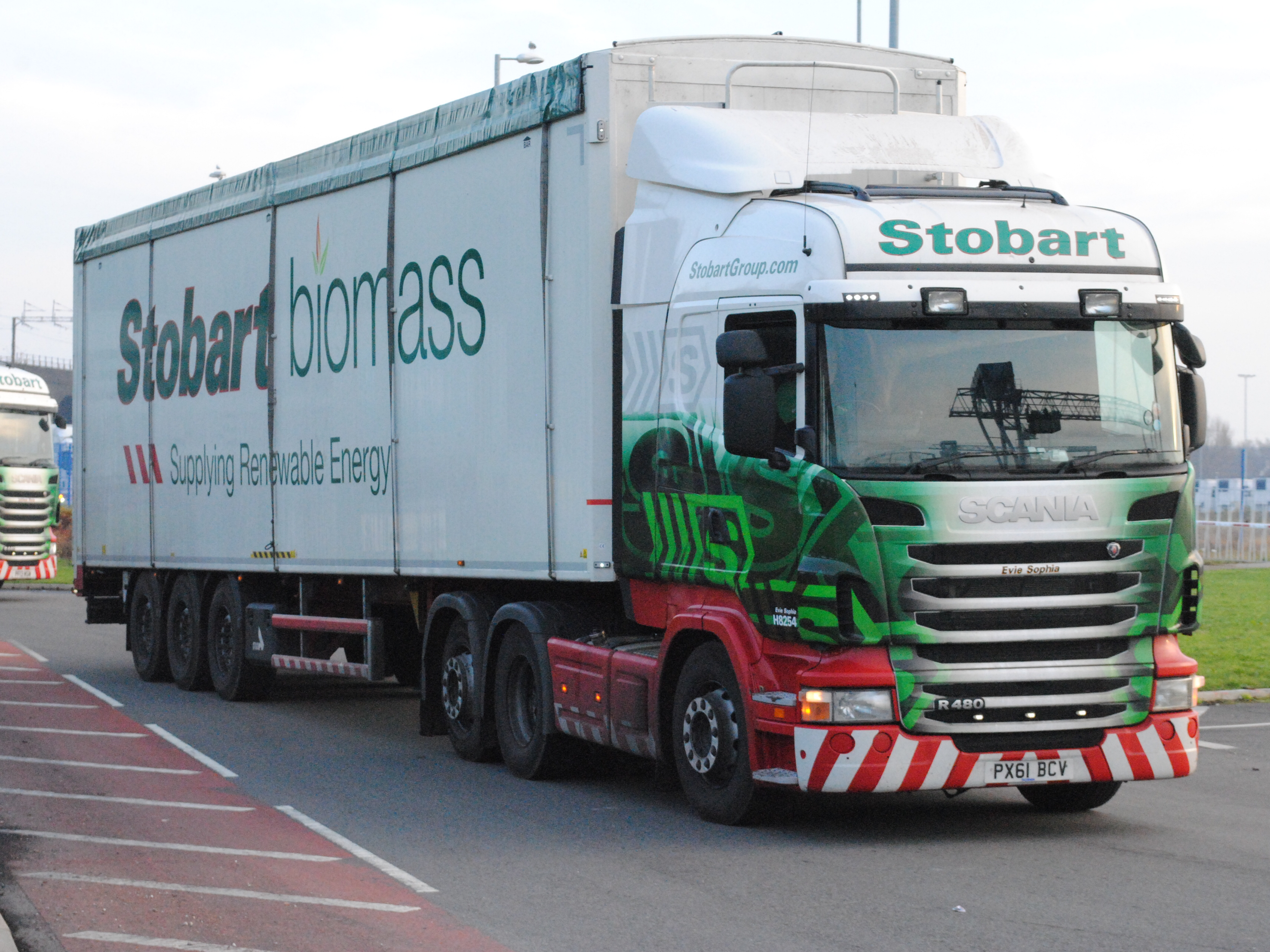
Stobart Biomass Scania R480 "Evie Sophia" lorry

On 24 March 2010, the Stobart Group announced the purchase of 50% of A. W. Jenkinson Biomass Ltd, from A. W. Jenkinson Forest Products, for £30 million, as an equal mix of cash and shares. A. W. Jenkinson Biomass Ltd was then renamed Stobart Biomass Products Ltd. Stobart Biomass transports sustainable wood products for use in low-carbon emission power plants, producing electricity at both large- and small-scale power plants, including for export. The Stobart Group also announced it was buying the remaining 50% of Stobart Biomass Products it did not already own for £20 million. On 25 April 2022, the name of the business was changed from Stobart Energy to Esken Renewables.

In March 2023, it was reported Esken had begun the process of selling Esken Renewables.
