= Callback =

Callback may refer to:

- Callback (comedy), a joke which refers to one previously told
- Callback (computer programming), callable (i.e. function) that is passed as data and expected to be called by another callable.
- Callback (telecommunications), the telecommunications event that occurs when the originator of a call is immediately called back in a second call as a response
- Callback verification, a method for e-mail address verification used in SMTP
- Web callback, a technology that provides telephone callback for websites
- Call Back, a 2024 album by Minho
- Callback, in the performing arts, a stage of the audition process
- "The Callback", an episode of Smash
- "Call Back" (Wonder Man), an episode of Wonder Man

== See also ==
- Caldbeck
- Callbeck
- Called Back (disambiguation)
