= Listed buildings in Caldbeck =

Caldbeck is a civil parish in the Cumberland unitary authority area of Cumbria, England. It contains 79 listed buildings that are recorded in the National Heritage List for England. Of these, one is listed at Grade I, the highest of the three grades, one is at Grade II*, the middle grade, and the others are at Grade II, the lowest grade. The parish contains the villages of Caldbeck and Hesket Newmarket, and is otherwise mainly rural. Most of the listed buildings are houses and associated structures, or farmhouses and farm buildings, in the villages and the surrounding countryside. The other listed buildings include a church, former industrial buildings, a former moot hall and a market cross, a public house, and bridges.

== Key ==
Grade	Criteria
I	Buildings of exceptional interest, sometimes considered to be internationally important
II*	Particularly important buildings of more than special interest
II	Buildings of national importance and special interest

== Buildings ==
Name and location	Photograph	Date	Notes	Grade
St Kentigern's Church; 54.74948°N 3.04961°W		12th century	The church was altered in the 13th century, in 1512, and in 1727, and it was restored in 1880 by C. J. Ferguson, and again in 1932 by J. F. Martindale. The tower is in limestone, the body of the church is in sandstone, and there is a green slate roof. The church consists of a west tower, a nave with a clerestory, aisles, a south porch, and a chancel with a south vestry. The tower has three stages and an embattled parapet. In the porch is a re-used Norman arch.	I
Woodhouse and barn 54.73203°N 3.00052°W	—	Early 17th century (probable)	The farmhouse and attached barn were altered in the 19th century, and both have green slate roofs. The house has a rendered front wall, the other walls being of mixed limestone and cobble rubble. It has two storeys and three bays, with a barn extension to the rear, giving a T-shaped plan. The windows were originally mullioned, but some mullions have been removed, and at the rear is a porch. In the barn are plank doors and lofts.	II
Church View; 54.74840°N 3.04985°W	—	Mid 17th century (probable)	Originally a row of three houses, later used as a house incorporating a shop. The building is in limestone, it is partly rendered, and has a green slate roof. There are two storeys and six bays. The windows are sashes, and two of the doorways have shaped and chamfered lintels.	II
High Brownrigg and former byres 54.75348°N 3.07917°W	—	Mid 17th century	The byres are the oldest part of the building, and the farmhouse dates from 1722. The house is roughcast with an eaves cornice, quoins, and a roof mainly of green slate, with some sandstone slate. It has two storeys and three bays, with a single-bay extension to the right. There are two doorways, both with chamfered surrounds and millstone doorsteps. The windows in the main part are casements with architraves, and in the extension they are sashes. The byres are in limestone and contain three Tudor arched doorways and other openings.	II
Barn, High Brownrigg; 54.75347°N 3.07860°W	—	17th century (probable)	The barn is in mixed limestone rubble with buttresses and a sandstone slate roof. It has three bays and is in a single storey. The barn contains a doorway with a chamfered surround, a projecting cart entrance, and ventilation slits in two rows. Inside are three pairs of upper cruck trusses.	II
High House and Barn End; 54.72414°N 3.02304°W	—	Mid 17th century (probable)	Originally a farmhouse and a barn, later converted into two houses, the barn dating from the 18th century. They are in mixed limestone and cobble rubble with a green slate roof. The houses have two storeys, and most of the windows are mullioned, although some mullions have been removed. High House has four bays, with a single-bay extension to the left, and Barn End has two bays. At the rear of High House is a stair projection and a Tudor arched doorway.	II
Paddigill; 54.75214°N 3.08658°W	—	Mid 17th century	A roughcast farmhouse with a Welsh slate roof, it is in two storeys and three bays. The central doorway has an architrave and a panelled frieze. Most of the windows are mullioned, some with mullions removed. There is also a casement window, and a small fire window. Above the doorway and some of the windows are hood moulds.	II
Haltcliffe Hall and byre/barn 54.72585°N 2.99529°W	—	1653	A farmhouse with attached barns in roughcast over limestone and sandstone rubble on large plinth stones. The roofs are mainly in Welsh slate with some green slate. The house has two storeys and an attic and is in four bays, with an extension at right-angles to the right, and a two-storey, two-bay barn to the left. The windows were originally mullioned; some windows have retained their mullions, others are sash windows in chamfered surrounds. The barn has a through segmental archway, and a Tudor arched loft door. Inside the house are two large inglenooks with bressumers.	II
Branthwaite Farmhouse, barns and byres 54.72582°N 3.09248°W	—	1658	The farmhouse, barns and byres have green slate roofs. The farmhouse is rendered on projecting plinth stones, and has two storeys and three bays. To the left of the farmhouse is a lower barn and a right-angled barn; to the right is a right-angled byre projection, in all forming a U-shaped plan. The outbuildings include a doorway with a shaped lintel, two doorways and lofts above with Tudor arched heads, ventilation slits, external steps, and a mullioned window.	II
High Greenrigg House and barns 54.72843°N 3.10577°W	—	1660	The farmhouse and adjoining barns, which were altered in 1715, and again in the 20th century, are in rendered limestone with a green slate roof. The house has two storeys and three bays, with a two-bay extension to the right. There is a doorway with a chamfered surround, an inscribed frieze, and a cornice, and another doorway with a re-used lintel. The windows are sashes and there is also a fire window. To the left of the house is a barn, and further to the left is a further, 19th-century, barn.	II
Greenrigg Farmhouse and barn 54.73445°N 3.10169°W	—	1663	The farmhouse and barn are rendered with a roof mainly of green slate, and with some Welsh slate. The house has two storeys and two bays, with a barn to the right, and a two-bay extension to the rear, forming an L-shaped plan. The house has a Tudor arched entrance and one sash window, the other windows being casements. The barn contains a blocked mullioned window, and the windows in the extension are sashes.	II
Haltcliff View and byre 54.71346°N 3.00840°W	—	1664	The farmhouse and byre are roughcast over rubble and cobble on a plinth of large stones, and they have a green slate roof. The house has two storeys and two bays, and contains sash windows. The doorway has a chamfered surround and a Tudor arched lintel. The byre to the right has windows and a doorway with chamfered surrounds. At the rear of the house is an outshut that has a mullioned window.	II
Hesket Hall; 54.73839°N 3.02694°W		Mid or late 17th century	A manor house, later used as a farmhouse, it is rendered and has quoins and a pyramidal green slate roof with a central chimney. It has a central square three-storey block and four single-storey gabled wings, giving it four-square symmetry. There are urns on the corners and ball finials on the gables. The garden face has a doorway with a chamfered surround with a hood mould, an oval window above, and sash windows elsewhere. The windows on the other faces have cross-mullions and hood moulds.	II*
Midtown Cottage, Kirkland House and Kirkland Cottage; 54.74850°N 3.05140°W	—	1666	A row of three houses that are roughcast over sandstone on large plinth stones, and have a green slate roof. The houses are in two storeys, two of them have two bays, and Kirkland Cottage, to the right, has one bay. The windows are sashes. Midtown Cottage, to the left, has a doorway with a dated and inscribed lintel, and Kirkland House has a doorway with an architrave.	II
Old Brewery; 54.74824°N 3.05445°W		1671	Originally probably a corn mill. it was later a cotton spinning mill, and then a brewery in the 1840s. This ceased production in the 20th century, it became derelict, and was then converted into houses. The building is in limestone and sandstone rubble with green slate roofs. A square tapering chimney rises through the original house, to the left is the former malthouse, and to the left of that is the former mill. The house has two storeys and two bays, the higher malthouse has two storeys and four bays with a pyramidal roof, and the lower mill has two storeys and four bays.	II
John Peel Cottage and barn 54.73858°N 3.09322°W	—	Late 17th century	The house and attached stable and barn were altered in 1777, and are rendered over mixed rubble on a chamfered plinth and with a green slate roof. The house has two storeys and two bays, with a single-bay stable to the left and a lower barn further to the left. Some of the windows in the house are mullioned and others are sashes. At the rear is a doorway, a mullioned stair window, and fire windows. The stable has a porch, a loft door above, a window, and ventilation slits. This was the home of the huntsman John Peel.	II
Manor Cottage; 54.72753°N 3.08003°W	—	Late 17th century	Originally a farmhouse, it is in mixed limestone and cobble. The main part has two storeys and three bays, and there is a single-storey, two-bay extension to the right; the main part has a Welsh slate roof, and the extension has a roof in green slate. The doorway has a chamfered surround, and the windows are sashes. There is also a blocked fire window, and a partly blocked mullioned window. On the right wall are external steps leading up to a loft.	II
Midtown Cottages; 54.74849°N 3.05112°W	—	Late 17th century (probable)	A pair of rendered Houses with sash windows and a green slate roof. The left house has two bays, and the right cottage has one. In the left house are two fire windows, and a doorway with a chamfered surround, and right house has a doorway with a painted stone surround.	II
Sun House; 54.73799°N 3.02607°W	—	Late 17th century (probable)	Originally a public house, later converted into a private house, it was extended in the late 18th century. The house is in stone, there are quoins in the extension, and it has a green slate roof. There are two storeys and three bays, and a single bay extension protruding forward on the right. The doorway has an architrave, and the windows are sashes, those in the original part being horizontally sliding sashes.	II
Todcrofts and barns 54.74638°N 3.05835°W	—	Late 17th century (probable)	A farmhouse and barns with green slate roofs. The house is rendered on a stone plinth, and has two storeys and six bays. Attached to the house are L-shaped barns, giving the whole a U-shaped plan. The doorway is in a round-arched porch, and has fluted pilasters with a decorative keystone. The windows are sashes, those in the ground floor having cornices. The barns are in mixed limestone rubble with sandstone quoins. They have a cart entrance with a segmental arch, plank doors, loft doors, and ventilation slits.	II
Bridge End House; 54.74890°N 3.05479°W	—	1690	The house, which was later extended, is stuccoed on a chamfered plinth, with an eaves cornice, quoins, and a green slate roof. It has two storeys, four bays, a single-storey extension, and a further single-storey extension at right-angles. Most of the windows are sashes in architraves. The left doorway has fluted pilasters, and a dentilled pediment. The right doorway has a bolection surround, and above it is an inscribed plaque. In the rear wall is a former mullioned window with its mullions removed. The end gable wall contains a re-used lintel dated 1688.	II
Billy Yard; 54.72583°N 3.09170°W	—	1693	A former farmhouse and barn in mixed limestone and cobble rubble on large plinth stones. The house has two storeys and three bays, and the lower barn is to the right. The entrance has an architrave and an inscribed lintel, and the windows have chamfered surrounds, some with retained mullions. The barn has a roof of green and Welsh slate, and three chamfered entrances and lofts with Tudor arched heads. Inside the house is a bressumer.	II
Holborn; 54.72169°N 3.11364°W	—	1693	A farmhouse in rubble with a green slate roof. It has two storeys and two bays, and the windows are sashes. There is a projecting outhouse to the left, and an outshut at the rear with a porch.	II
Burblethwaite and barn 54.72422°N 3.10835°W	—	1694 (?)	The farmhouse and attached barn are in limestone with a Welsh slate roof. The front of the house is pebbledashed, and it is in two storeys and three bays. The doorway has a bolection architrave, a pulvinated frieze, and a cornice, and the windows are sashes with chamfered surrounds. The barn to the right has a dated lintel.	II
Low Brownrigg and barns 54.75830°N 3.07013°W	—	1695	The farmhouse and adjoining barns are roughcast on a projecting plinth with green slate roofs. The house has two storeys and five bays, with two further bays to the right. The door has an architrave with an inscribed lintel. The windows were originally mullioned; some of them are casements, some are sashes, and there are also fire windows and an oval window. The barns are at right angles to the house, and contain entrances with chamfered surrounds, one with a Tudor arched head, casement windows, and a doorway with a chamfered surround.	II
Pasture Lane Cottage; 54.72918°N 3.01500°W	—	1695	A house with a former stable or barn incorporated. It is in rubble with a 20th-century tile roof, and has two storeys and two bays, with a single-storey outshut at the rear. The doorway has a chamfered alternate-block surround. Most of the windows have been replaced, but there is a small original window in the outshut.	II
Field Barn; 54.74692°N 3.05483°W	—	Late 17th or 18th century	The barn was later extended by the addition of a food store. It is in limestone rubble with a roof mainly of Lakeland slate and some sandstone slate. It has a rectangular plan with a narrower extension. The barn contains an entrance with a quoined surround and a chamfered lintel, ventilation slits, and other openings.	II
Rose Cottage; 54.73761°N 3.02423°W	—	Late 17th or early 18th century	The house is roughcast with a slate roof, in two storeys and two bays. The doorway has a chamfered surround, and the windows are casements, also with chamfered surrounds, and one is a fire window. There is a single-storey extension to the right, which is rendered with a green slate roof.	II
Low Mill; 54.74947°N 3.04838°W		1702	Originally a corn mill then a sawmill, and later used for other purposes. It is in limestone and sandstone with a green slate roof, in two storeys with a U-shaped plan. It contains doorways and casement windows, and on the right side i an external mill wheel. Some machinery remains inside.	II
Hutton Sceugh; 54.72930°N 3.00941°W	—	1707	A roughcast farmhouse with a green slate roof, in two storeys and four bays, and with a single-bay lean-to extension to the left. The doorway has a chamfered surround and a Tudor arched lintel. The windows are casements with chamfered surrounds.	II
Howbeck Farmhouse, Cottage and barns 54.73687°N 3.01768°W	—	1710	The buildings have green slate roofs; the farmhouse and cottage are stuccoed and have two storeys. The house has three bays and sash windows that were originally mullioned. The cottage has two bays and one sash window, the others being casements. There is a lower barn to the left, and a barn to the right at right-angles. They are in rubble, the right barn having two loft doors and external stone steps. The left barn has a cart entrance, a doorway and a casement window.	II
Bridge House and Gate Bridge Cottage; 54.74800°N 3.05210°W	—	1718	A house with an extension to the rear, which is now a separate cottage; both are stuccoed with sash windows and a green slate roof, and both have two storeys. The house has three bays, an eaves cornice, and quoins. The central doorway has a bolection surround and a swan-neck pediment containing an inscription, and the windows have architraves. The cottage has two bays, a round-arched staircase window, and a lean-to extension with a lattice porch.	II
Beech Cottages; 54.73799°N 3.02693°W	—	Early 18th century	A row of four sandstone cottages with a green slate roof. They have two storeys, and each cottage is in a single bay. The doorways and windows have painted surrounds; some of the windows are sashes, and others are casements.	II
Berkeley Cottage; 54.73820°N 3.02715°W	—	Early 18th century	This originated as a farmhouse, it was then divided into two houses that were later combined into one house. It is rendered with a green slate roof, and has two storeys and two bays, with a former single-bay house to the right now incorporated. Some of the windows are horizontal sliding sashes, and others are casements.	II
The Green and No.2 The Green; 54.73844°N 3.02563°W	—	Early 18th century	A pair of roughcast houses with a green slate roof, both with steps leading up to the doorway. No 2, to the right, has two storeys and a cellar, and a single bay. The windows are a mix of sashes and casements, and there is a blocked cellar window and a small cellar door. The Green has two storeys and two bays. The doorway and its windows, which are sashes, have chamfered surrounds.	II
Greenside; 54.73809°N 3.02537°W	—	Early 18th century	A roughcast house with a Welsh slate roof, in two storeys and five bays. The central doorway has a shouldered architrave with a frieze and a cornice. The windows are sashes with architraves.	II
John Peel Farm; 54.73860°N 3.09253°W	—	Early 18th century (probable)	Originally a farmhouse, later a private house, in rendered limestone with angle pilasters and a green slate roof. It is in two storeys and two bays. There are 20th-century casement windows in chamfered surrounds, and the doorway also has a chamfered surround.	II
Rough Close and barns 54.72007°N 3.12223°W	—	Early 18th century	A farmhouse and barns in rubble with green slate roofs. The house has two storeys and three bays, with a single-bay barn to the right, and a right-angled barn to the left, forming a U-shaped plan. In the house are sash windows in chamfered surrounds, and small fire windows. The barns have plank doors, cart entrances, and ventilation slits. Inside the house is an inglenook and a bressumer.	II
Glen View and Glen Court; 54.74417°N 3.05674°W	—	1728	A house that was later extended and divided into two dwellings. It is stuccoed with an eaves cornice and quoins. The main part has a Welsh slate roof, and the roof of the extension is in green slate. There are two storeys and two bays, with a rear extension forming a T-shaped plan. The doorway has an architrave with a dated and inscribed frieze, and a cornice supported on consoles. The windows are mainly sashes, with one casement window at the rear.	II
Howbeck Cottages; 54.73562°N 3.01548°W	—	1729	Originally a Friends' Meeting House, it was converted into three cottages in 1934. The building is rendered, with some projecting plinth stones, and it has a roof partly of Welsh slate and partly of green slate. There is a single storey and five bays, the outer cottages having two bays and the central cottage with one. The windows are sashes.	II
Green Head and barns 54.72407°N 3.11080°W	—	1732	The farmhouse and attached barns are in rendered limestone and cobble rubble with green slate roofs. The house has two storeys and three bays with flanking barns and a rear extension, giving a T-shaped plan. There is a gabled stone porch with an inscribed and dated lintel, and the windows are sashes. In the barns are plank doors and ventilation slits.	II
Haltcliff House and barn 54.71743°N 2.99757°W		1732	The farmhouse and barn are in mixed rubble. The house has an eaves cornice, quoins, and a green slate roof. There are two storeys and two bays. The doorway has an architrave with a dated and inscribed frieze and a cornice, and the windows are sashes. There is a small blocked window above the doorway. The barn has a Welsh slate roof, and it contains a sliding door with a loft door above.	II
Elm Lodge and Green Way; 54.73848°N 3.02353°W		1735	A pair of houses, with Green Way, the house on the right, added in the late 18th century. The houses are stuccoed with a Welsh slate roof, and have two storeys. Elm Lodge has three bays, and contains sash windows. Its doorway has an architrave with a cornice on consoles. Green Way has two bays, a gabled porch, and one casement window, the other windows being sashes.	II
Hudscales Cottage and barn 54.72742°N 3.03739°W	—	1738	The farmhouse and the barn, which dates from the late 18th century, have been converted into a private house. They are in rubble and have a green slate roof. The house has two storeys and three bays, with a single bay to the left, and a single-bay barn further to the left. On the front of the house is a 19th-century porch, and above the inner door is a dated and inscribed lintel. The windows, which were originally mullioned, are sashes in chamfered surrounds, and there are small fire windows. Inside the house is an inglenook and a bressumer.	II
Church Bridge; 54.74964°N 3.04994°W		18th century (probable)	A footbridge over Cald Beck, it is in mixed limestone and sandstone rubble. The bridge is narrow and consists of a single humped arch that has a solid parapet with saddleback coping.	II
Hesket Bridge; 54.74043°N 3.02176°W		Mid 18th century (probable)	The bridge carries a road over the River Caldew. It was widened in the 19th century and repaired in the 20th century. The bridge is in limestone and consists of two segmental arches on a central pier with pointed cutwaters, The bridge has a solid parapet with chamfered coping.	II
Rectory garden wall and gateway 54.74850°N 3.05022°W	—	18th century (probable)	The garden wall is in sandstone and limestone rubble on larger plinth stones. At the front is a gateway with rusticated piers. The side entrance contains a re-used lintel with a frieze and a scrolled pediment containing a coat of arms.	II
Whelpo Bridge; 54.74702°N 3.07625°W		18th century (probable)	The bridge carries a road over Whelpo Beck. It is in mixed limestone, sandstone, and cobble rubble, and consists of a narrow humped single segmental arch. The bridge has a solid parapet with chamfered coping.	II
The Beeches; 54.73805°N 3.02575°W	—	Mid to late 18th century	A roughcast house with quoins and a green slate roof. It has two storeys and four bays, and contains sash windows. The main doorway has an architrave with a dentilled pediment, and there is another doorway to the right, also with an architrave.	II
Midtown Farmhouse; 54.74818°N 3.05106°W	—	Mid or late 18th century	The farmhouse is stuccoed with an eaves cornice, quoins, and a green slate roof with coped gables. It has two storeys and five bays, with a single-storey two-bay extension at the rear. The doorcase has fluted pilasters, a dentilled triglyph frieze, and a dentilled pediment. The windows are sashes with architraves, and on the extension is a coat of arms.	II
Berkeley House and barn 54.73811°N 3.02705°W	—	Late 18th century	The house was extended to the rear in the 19th century. The house and barn have green slate roofs. There are two storeys in the house and three bays, and there is a barn at the rear giving an L-shaped plan. The left side of the house is gabled and has shaped bargeboards, and the windows are sashes. The barn is in rubble and contains doorways, sash windows, a garage doorway, and a loft door.	II
Garage and woodshed Bridge End House; 54.74878°N 3.05461°W	—	Late 18th century	Originally a barn and stables, it is in limestone rubble with a Welsh slate roof, and is a low building with two bays. A former cart entrance is partly blocked and contains a garage door. There is a doorway with an alternate-block surround and a loft door above.	II
Cannon House; 54.73797°N 3.02642°W	—	Late 18th century	A stuccoed house with a slate roof in two storeys and three bays. It has a doorway with pilasters and a cornice, and to the left of it is a garage door with a segmental arch. The windows are sashes.	II
Carrock Cottage; 54.70979°N 3.00153°W	—	Late 18th century (probable)	A stuccoed house with a Welsh slate roof, in two storeys and two bays. The sash windows and the 20th-century doorway have painted surrounds.	II
Garage; 54.73825°N 3.02586°W		Late 18th century	This was originally a moot hall and a couch house, and was later used for other purposes, It is a square building with roughcast walls and a hipped green slate roof. The building has two storeys and two bays, with garage doors in the ground floor. The windows are casements, and external steps lead up to a doorway that formerly served a meeting room.	II
Greenrigg House; 54.73560°N 3.09996°W	—	Late 18th century	The former farmhouse is rendered with an eaves cornice, quoins, and a green slate roof. It has two storeys and three bays. The doorways have architraves with dentilled friezes. Most of the windows are sashes with some casements.	II
Howbeck House and former barn 54.73787°N 3.01906°W	—	Late 18th century	Originally a farmhouse and barn, later converted into a private house with a green slate roof. The former farmhouse is roughcast, and has two storeys and two bays. The main doorway has an architrave and a hood on consoles. The windows are sashes, some with architraves. The former barn is in limestone and split cobbles, and has quoins and three bays. It contains a large cart entrance, a smaller archway, doorways, and ventilation slits. The barn has a lower extension with a doorway and a sash window.	II
Barn, Hudscales Cottage; 54.72749°N 3.03756°W	—	Late 18th century (probable)	The barn is in mixed limestone and cobble rubble, and has a green slate roof. It is in a single storey, and has a roughly L-shaped plan. The barn contains a cart entrance, and three plank doors with wooden lintels.	II
Rowena Cottage; 54.73798°N 3.02591°W	—	Late 18th century	A rendered house with quoins to the right and a green slate roof. It has two storeys and two bays, and contains sash windows.	II
Whelpo House; 54.74707°N 3.07480°W	—	Late 18th century	The house was extended in the early 19th century. It is pebbledashed with quoins and green slate roofs. The main part has two storeys and two bays, and there is a single-bay extension at right-angles on the left; there is also a barn and stables at the rear. The windows are sashes, and there is a porch with casement windows on the right wall. The doorway in the extension has fluted pilasters, a dentilled pediment, and side windows. In the barn is a cart entrance with a segmental arch.	II
Carrock House; 54.70991°N 3.00157°W	—	1777	Originally a public house, later converted into a private house, it is roughcast with a roof partly of Welsh slate and partly of green slate. It has two storeys and two bays, with a lower extension to the left. On the front is a gabled porch that has an inner doorway with a dated lintel. The windows are sashes.	II
Rectory; 54.74920°N 3.05014°W	—	1785	The rectory was extended in the early 19th century. It is rendered with quoins and a hipped green slate roof. There are two storeys and a main range of five bays, a two-storey five-bay wing at the rear, and a single-storey bay at the end, giving the building an L-shaped plan. The central bay at the front is canted with four Doric columns. This is flanked by a pair of three-light Gothick-style windows, and all the windows are sashes. In the single-bay extension is a re-set doorcase with fluted pilasters and a dentilled cornice.	II
Former farmhouse, Townend; 54.70807°N 2.99358°W	—	1797	The farmhouse has since been used as a store. It is in metamorphic rubble and limestone, with an eaves cornice, quoins, and a green slate roof. The building has two storeys and two bays, and contains sash windows in limestone surrounds. It has a gabled porch with a re-used door surround and a triangular datestone.	II
Mill House and Mill; 54.74855°N 3.05463°W	—	Late 18th or early 19th century	The house and former corn mill are in limestone with quoins and green slate roofs. The house has two storeys and two bays, and contains sash windows. The mill is behind and to the right of the house, and contains casement windows, a doorway and a loft door. There is also a single-bay extension at the front, and the remains of the wheel house to the right.	II
Smithy Cottage and House; 54.73846°N 3.02540°W	—	Late 18th or early 19th century	A pair of roughcast houses with a green slate roof, in two storeys. Each house has two bays and a gabled porch with casement windows and a side entrance. The other windows are sashes.	II
Askewmire and barn 54.72543°N 3.09413°W	—	1814	The farmhouse and attached barn have a green slate roof. The house is rendered, it has two storeys and two bays and contains sash windows. The barn to the left has a central segmental cart entrance at the rear with flanking plank doors.	II
Blanket Mill; 54.74781°N 3.05245°W	—	Early 19th century	A water mill, originally used as a threshing mill, later as a woollen blanket mill, and then as a clog maker's workshop. It is in limestone with sandstone quoins, and has a slate roof. There are three storeys in a T-shaped plan, and the windows are casements. Features include a large cart entrance with a segmental arch and an alternate-block surround, and external stone steps. Some of the internal machinery has been retained.	II
Branthwaite Cottage; 54.72585°N 3.09189°W	—	Early 19th century	A house built in rubble and split cobbles that has limestone quoins and a green slate roof. It has two storeys and two bays. The windows are sashes.	II
Denton House; 54.73824°N 3.02418°W	—	Early 19th century	A stuccoed house with a green slate roof, in 2 1/2 storeys and four bays. It contains 20th-century doors and sash windows.	II
Dickens House; 54.73840°N 3.02613°W	—	Early 19th century	Originally the Queen's Head Inn, later converted into a private house, it is in limestone with quoins and a hipped green slate roof. There are two storeys and two bays, and the house has sash windows. There are two doorways, each with a chamfered surround.	II
Harkness Barn; 54.74821°N 3.05199°W	—	Early 19th century	The barn is in sandstone and limestone rubble with a Welsh slate roof; it is a long barn in a single storey. In the centre is a cart entrance with an alternate-block surround and a segmental arch with a keystone. In the left gable wall is another cart entrance, and in the right gable wall is a loft door under pigeon holes. There is a rear outshut with a garage door and casement windows. (Note: Street View in March 2010 shows that the barn has been altered and converted for domestic use.)	II
Kings Arms House and Cottage; 54.73805°N 3.02661°W	—	Early 19th century	Originally a public house with an attached cottage, they were later converted into two houses. The houses are stuccoed with a green slate roof, they have two storeys, and both have sash windows. Kings Arms House, to the left, has two bays, and a doorway with pilasters and a cornice. The Cottage has one bay with quoins on the right corner, and on the right gable end is a doorway with an architrave, and a decorative bargeboard.	II
Market Cross; 54.73828°N 3.02572°W		Early 19th century	This is a rebuild of an earlier structure. It consists of four cylindrical rusticated sandstone piers carrying a pyramidal green slate roof with a cannonball finial. The interior is cobbled and contains two sandstone stumps.	II
Oddfellows Arms Inn; 54.74836°N 3.05182°W		Early 19th century	A public house, altered in the 1920s, it is roughcast with quoins and a green slate roof. The public house has two storeys and three bays, with a two-storey single-bay extension to the rear. In the centre are double doors with a cornice, and the windows are sashes. The side entrance has a doorway with a chamfered surround and a shaped lintel. The rear extension has a hipped Welsh slate roof.	II
Temperance Hall; 54.73806°N 3.02670°W	—	Early 19th century	This originated as a cottage, was then used as a Temperance Hall, and then again became a cottage. The cottage continues to display a wooden sign relating to its previous use. It is in roughcast rubble and has a slate roof. There are two storeys and central doorway with an architrave and a cornice. There are two fixed windows in each floor with architraves.	II
Whelpo Head; 54.74743°N 3.08266°W	—	Early 19th century	A rendered farmhouse on a chamfered plinth with angle pilasters and a slate roof. It has two storeys and three bays, and contains sash windows. The doorway is round-headed with a radial fanlight and a false keystone.	II
Wood Hall and barns 54.72631°N 3.02550°W	—	Early 19th century	A farmhouse with adjoining barns in mixed rubble and cobbles, with sandstone pilastered quoins and green slate roofs. The farmhouse has two storeys and four bays, with a right-angled barn to the left and an L-shaped barn to the right, forming a U-shaped plan. The house has a doorway with pilasters and a radial fanlight with a false keystone, and the windows are sashes. The left barn has a loft door, and the right barn has a large projecting cart entrance, ventilation slits, and a loft door.	II
Midtown Farm Cottages and barn 54.74803°N 3.05187°W	—	Early to mid 19th century	A row of two houses and a barn in mixed limestone and sandstone rubble with a green slate roof. The houses have two storeys and contain sash windows with chamfered surrounds. The right house has two bays, and the left house has one bay, and it contains a doorway with alternate-block surround. The barn, to the left, contains plank doors and ventilation holes.	II
Brewery House; 54.74843°N 3.05426°W	—	1861	The house is in sandstone and limestone rubble on a chamfered plinth, with rusticated quoins and a green slate roof. It has two storeys and three bays, and contains sash windows in chamfered surrounds. The doorway has a Tudor arched surround, and above the doorway and windows are hood moulds.	II

== Notes and references ==
=== Sources ===
- Historic England, "Church of St Kentigern, Caldbeck (1327205)", National Heritage List for England
- Historic England, "Woodhouse and adjoining barn, Caldbeck (1144453)", National Heritage List for England
- Historic England, "Church View and Church View Shop, Caldbeck (1144433)", National Heritage List for England
- Historic England, "High Brownrigg and adjoining former byres, Caldbeck (1327229)", National Heritage List for England
- Historic England, "Barn to east of High Brownrigg, Caldbeck (1144437)", National Heritage List for England
- Historic England, "High House and Barn End, Caldbeck (1327256)", National Heritage List for England
- Historic England, "Paddigill, Caldbeck (1327230)", National Heritage List for England
- Historic England, "Haltcliffe Hall and adjoining byre/barn, Caldbeck (1138260)", National Heritage List for England
- Historic England, "Branthwaite Farmhouse and adjoining barns and byres, Caldbeck (1327204)", National Heritage List for England
- Historic England, "High Greenrigg House and adjoining barns, Caldbeck (1138042)", National Heritage List for England
- Historic England, "Greenrigg Farmhouse and adjoining barn, Caldbeck (1144440)", National Heritage List for England
- Historic England, "Haltcliff View and adjoining byre, Caldbeck (1138069)", National Heritage List for England
- Historic England, "Hesket Hall, Caldbeck (1144444)", National Heritage List for England
- Historic England, "Midtown Cottage, Kirkland House and Kirkland Cottage, Caldbeck (1327206)", National Heritage List for England
- Historic England, "The Old Brewery, Caldbeck (1144435)", National Heritage List for England
- Historic England, "John Peel Cottage and adjoining barn, Caldbeck (1144438)", National Heritage List for England
- Historic England, "Manor Cottage, Caldbeck (1138020)", National Heritage List for England
- Historic England, "Midtown Cottages, Caldbeck (1137893)", National Heritage List for England
- Historic England, "Sun House, Caldbeck (1327232)", National Heritage List for England
- Historic England, "Todcrofts and adjoining barns, Caldbeck (1144454)", National Heritage List for England
- Historic England, "Bridge End House, Caldbeck (1327227)", National Heritage List for England
- Historic England, "Former farmhouse and barn Known as Billy Yard, north-west of Branthwaite House, Caldbeck (1144472)", National Heritage List for England
- Historic England, "Holborn, Caldbeck (1312127)", National Heritage List for England
- Historic England, "Burblethwaite and adjoining barn, Caldbeck (1138058)", National Heritage List for England
- Historic England, "Low Brownrigg and adjoining barns, Caldbeck (1137848)", National Heritage List for England
- Historic England, "Pasture Lane Cottage, Caldbeck (1138274)", National Heritage List for England
- Historic England, "Field Barn, Caldbeck (1416127)", National Heritage List for England
- Historic England, "Rose Cottage, Caldbeck (1138183)", National Heritage List for England
- Historic England, "Low Mill, Caldbeck (1312108)", National Heritage List for England
- Historic England, "Hutton Sceugh, Caldbeck (1327236)", National Heritage List for England
- Historic England, "Howbeck Farmhouse and Howbeck Cottage and adjoining barns, Caldbeck (1138204)", National Heritage List for England
- Historic England, "Bridge House and Gate Bridge Cottage, Caldbeck (1312088)", National Heritage List for England
- Historic England, "Beech Cottages, Caldbeck (1311991)", National Heritage List for England
- Historic England, "The Green and No. 2 The Green, Caldbeck (1144445)", National Heritage List for England
- Historic England, "Greenside, Caldbeck (1138169)", National Heritage List for England
- Historic England, "John Peel Farm, Caldbeck (1138034)", National Heritage List for England
- Historic England, "Rough Close and adjoining barns, Caldbeck (1144471)", National Heritage List for England
- Historic England, "Glen View and Glen Court, Caldbeck (1327254)", National Heritage List for England
- Historic England, "Howbeck Cottages, Caldbeck (1327235)", National Heritage List for England
- Historic England, "Green Head and adjoining barns, Caldbeck (1144441)", National Heritage List for England
- Historic England, "Haltcliff House and adjoining barn, Caldbeck (1144442)", National Heritage List for England
- Historic England, "Elm Lodge and Green Way, Caldbeck (1144450)", National Heritage List for England
- Historic England, "Hudscales Cottage and adjoining barn, Caldbeck (1138231)", National Heritage List for England
- Historic England, "Church Bridge, Caldbeck (1144474)", National Heritage List for England
- Historic England, "Hesket Bridge, Caldbeck (1327234)", National Heritage List for England
- Historic England, "Garden wall surrounding Rectory including front gateway, Caldbeck (1137868)", National Heritage List for England
- Historic England, "Whelpo Bridge, Caldbeck (1327255)", National Heritage List for England
- Historic England, "The Beeches, Caldbeck (1144448)", National Heritage List for England
- Historic England, "Midtown Farmhouse, Caldbeck (1327226)", National Heritage List for England
- Historic England, "Berkeley House and barn to rear, Caldbeck (1144446)", National Heritage List for England
- Historic England, "Garage and woodshed to south of Bridge End House, Caldbeck (1144434)", National Heritage List for England
- Historic England, "Cannon House, Caldbeck (1138137)", National Heritage List for England
- Historic England, "Carrock Cottage, Caldbeck (1312007)", National Heritage List for England
- Historic England, "The Garage, Caldbeck (1311971)", National Heritage List for England
- Historic England, "Greenrigg House, Caldbeck (1144439)", National Heritage List for England
- Historic England, "Howbeck House and former barn, Caldbeck (1144451)", National Heritage List for England
- Historic England, "Barn adjoining to north-west of Hudscales Cottage, Caldbeck (1144452)", National Heritage List for England
- Historic England, "Rowena Cottage, Caldbeck (1138162)", National Heritage List for England
- Historic England, "Whelpo House, Caldbeck (1144411)", National Heritage List for England
- Historic England, "Carrock House, Caldbeck (1144443)", National Heritage List for England
- Historic England, "Rectory, Caldbeck (1144473)", National Heritage List for England
- Historic England, "Former farmhouse west of Townend, Caldbeck (1311944)", National Heritage List for England
- Historic England, "Mill House and adjoining mill, Caldbeck (1144436)", National Heritage List for England
- Historic England, "Smithy Cottage and Smithy House, Caldbeck (1138124)", National Heritage List for England
- Historic England, "Askewmire and adjoining barn, Caldbeck (1312129)", National Heritage List for England
- Historic England, "J Strong & Son Clog Makers (Blanket Mill), Caldbeck (1327207)", National Heritage List for England
- Historic England, "Branthwaite Cottage, Caldbeck (1137842)", National Heritage List for England
- Historic England, "Denton House, Caldbeck (1327233)", National Heritage List for England
- Historic England, "Dickens House, Caldbeck (1138111)", National Heritage List for England
- Historic England, "Harkness Barn, Caldbeck (1137907)", National Heritage List for England
- Historic England, "Kings Arms House and Kings Arms Cottage, Caldbeck (1144447)", National Heritage List for England
- Historic England, "Market Cross, Caldbeck (1144449)", National Heritage List for England
- Historic England, "John Peel Inn, Caldbeck (1144475)", National Heritage List for England
- Historic England, "Temperance Hall, Caldbeck (1145206)", National Heritage List for England
- Historic England, "Whelpo Head, Caldbeck (1144412)", National Heritage List for England
- Historic England, "Wood Hall and adjoining barns, Caldbeck (1144413)", National Heritage List for England
- Historic England, "Midtown Farm Cottages (Nos 1 & 2) and adjoining barn, Caldbeck (1144476)", National Heritage List for England
- Historic England, "Brewery House, Caldbeck (1327228)", National Heritage List for England
- Historic England, Listed Buildings
- Hyde, Matthew; Pevsner, Nikolaus (2010) [1967], Cumbria, The Buildings of England, New Haven and London: Yale University Press, ISBN 978-0-300-12663-1
