= Mobile social network =

Social networking on mobile devices

Facebook mobile graphical user interface

Mobile social networking is social networking where individuals with similar interests converse and connect with one another through their mobile phone and/or tablet. Much like web-based social networking, mobile social networking occurs in virtual communities.

Many web-based social networking sites, such as Facebook and X, have created mobile applications to give their users instant and real-time access from anywhere they have access to the Internet. Additionally, native mobile social networks have been created to allow communities to be built around mobile functionality.

More and more, the line between mobile and web is being blurred as mobile apps use existing social networks to create native communities and promote discovery, and web-based social networks take advantage of mobile features and accessibility.

As mobile web evolved from proprietary mobile technologies and networks, to full mobile access to the Internet, the distinction changed to the following types:

1. Web-based social networks being extended for mobile access through mobile browsers and smartphone apps
2. Native mobile social networks with dedicated focus on mobile use such as mobile communication, location-based services, and augmented reality

While mobile and web-based social networking systems often work symbiotically to spread content, increase accessibility, and connect users, consumers are increasingly spending their attention on native apps compared to web browsers.

== History ==
The evolution of social networking on mobile networks started in 1999 with basic chatting and texting services. With the introduction of various technologies in mobile networks, social networking has reached an advance level over four generations.

=== 1999–2004 ===
Technologies used in this generation are application-based, pre-installed on mobile handsets. Features include text-only chat via chat rooms. The people who used these services were anonymous. The services of this generation's mobile social networks can be used on a pay-as-you-go or subscription-to-service basis.

=== 2004–2006 ===
The introduction of 3G and camera phones added many features such as uploading photos, mobile search for person based on profile, and contacting/flirting with another person anonymously. Regional distributions of these features include Japan, Korea, Australia, Western Europe and US. The applications are mostly useful for dating purposes. The services of this generation's mobile social networks can be used on a pay-as-you-go or subscription-to-service basis.

=== 2006–2008 ===
The experiments for this generation mobile social networks started in 2006. It was adopted widely in 2008/2009. This generation brought tremendous changes and made mobile social networks as a part of daily life. The features include a richer user experience, automatic publishing to web profile and status updates, some Web 2.0 features, search by group/join by interests, alerts, location-based services and content sharing (especially music). Technologies include WAP 2.0, Java on the server, MMS, and voice capture. Applications introduced were customized with general interests such as music and mobile-specific content distribution. Regional distributions of this generation of mobile social networks include Japan, Korea, Western Europe, and North America. Advertising and ad-supported content become increasingly important. The services in this generation can be used with pay-as-you-go plans; subscription-based plans were still popular as networks increased their scale to become content distribution platforms.

=== 2008–present ===
Fourth generation began in 2008 and reached in 2010. All the features in third generation are advanced in this generation of social mobile networks. The features of this generation include the features of the third generation, the ability to hide/mask one's presence, asynchronous video conversation, multi-point audio chat conversation with one button, and multiplayer mobile gaming. Technologies which made these features possible are Web 2.0 widgets, Flash Lite, OpenSocial, and Open Handset Alliance. The business model of previous generations continued along with virtual currency – the purchase and trade of virtual goods.

In parallel to the increase of various technologies in mobile networks, the number of hours spent per adult on mobile devices per day has increased dramatically since 2008. As of 2014, mobile devices have surpassed desktop/laptops as the most used device per day for internet usage. A steady increase of mobile application usage over the past few years has contributed to the rise of mobile social networks, as well as to the diversity of usage of mobile social networks.

As the use of mobile social networks has increased, the location-based services within the mobile social network has also been increasing. Social network service companies now provide more location-based services for customers' wide use of the mobile devices and their convenience.

== Usage ==
Mobile social networking sites allow users to create a profile, send and receive messages via phone or computer and visit an online version of a mobile site. There were different models which were adapted by different networking sites. Most of these sites have many unique features or special functions, but the main function of the site remains the same as other services. All these sites are categorized according to the following business models and usage.

=== Social network ===
Similar to there being many online social networking sites, such as Facebook and Twitter, there are just as many social network on mobile devices. They offer vast number of functions including multimedia posts, photo sharing, and instant messaging. Most of these mobile apps offer free international calling and texting capabilities. Today, social networking apps are not just for the social aspect, but are frequently used for professional aspects as well, such as LinkedIn, which is still constantly growing. Along with sharing multimedia posts and instant messaging, social networks are commonly used to connect immigrants in a new country. While the thought of moving to a new country may be intimidating for many, social media can be used to connect immigrants of the same land together to make assimilation a little less stressful.

=== Messaging ===
This model is focused on the ability to send short, text-based messages to an individual, group of close friends, or even a large group of classmates, simultaneously. This category enables messages to reach the right people as quickly as possible. Many messaging apps are very popular, maybe even more than classical texting. Some social network platforms, such as Facebook, have their own native messaging applications, similar to Facebook Messenger. Different countries have a certain messenger that is predominant, like China with WeChat, Korea with KakaoTalk, and the US with WhatsApp.

=== Media share ===
This can be viewed as an advanced version of the messenger category. In addition to text messages, audio and video files can be transmitted among a group, such as Skype or Oovoo, which are forms of online video chatting. In the case of Instagram and Vine, photos and videos of personal lives are shared to either friends or to the public. Similarly, Pinterest is used to share photos, but on a more community level. Mary Meeker's KPCB report stated that time spent on short video apps climbed 360% in 2017. The largest media sharing app today is YouTube, which allows people post videos and share with the public. Many of these services store media content online for easy storage and access.

=== Local discoverability ===
Some mobile social networks, such as Yelp, FourSquare and YikYak, allow users to search for local venues. Many of these apps publish crowd-sourced reviews and tips about restaurants, shops, places of interest and more. Yelp and FourSquare also personalizes each user's database according to their latest search and interest to make searching more efficient.

=== Social gaming ===
This model is about connecting people through both multi-player and competitive single-player games. Mobile devices are always increasing their capacity for graphics performance and computing power, making them capable gaming devices. The leader in this category is Zynga, creators of Farmville and Words with Friends, though it has suffered a decline. Hearthstone is another popular mobile game where players use monster and spell cards to fight each other. Many games also introduce the idea of having another player as an "ally" during game play. For example, in Naruto Blazing, players can choose one person from a set of players to be on their team while fighting enemies throughout the game. Mobile social networks can also connect people outside of the mobile environment. Pokémon Go incorporated augmented reality to allow players to catch Pokémon while together physically while outside. Players can also battle each other at gyms in various locations in the world. Facebook has also integrated games through its chat messenger. For example, friends can play chess by sending "@fbchess play" to the other person or basketball by sending a basketball emoji and clicking on the emoji.

=== Dating ===
These are location-based apps that allow users to create a profile and are matched with those who have similar interests. Some of these sites use radar to ping a user if there is a matching single profile within a certain distance. Tinder was the first dating app that started the trend and has one of the largest user base. Other dating apps include Coffee Meets Bagel and OkCupid. These sites are marked with serious security measures, so that no personal details are released without the user's consent. However, there still has been several dangerous incidents that rose questions of whether Tinder-like apps are safe and should be kept around.

=== Music ===
Music apps connect people by sharing playlists and being able to see what other people are listening to. Spotify, a very popular music site, is also used to social networking in a sense that people can see what their friends are listening to at the moment as well. Users can also follow certain artists or even friends that they want to, which is a form of “liking” a post on Facebook. Other social media music apps include radio stations like Pandora and last.fm.

=== Fitness ===
Recently, mobile social networks has also been used to motivate individuals to stick to their fitness and health goals. These social networks either work as a form of encouragement by rewarding the individual when they have accomplish a goal, or as a form of punishment by disciplining those who failed to accomplish their goal through a monetary cost or social pressure. An example of this network is PACT. In PACT, individuals make a weekly goal to exercise more or eat healthier and set a monetary amount that you will pay if you don't succeed. Using the app, you can prove that you were at the gym through GPS or that you ate healthy meals by uploading pictures of the meal. If you succeed in your goal, you earn cash paid by members who didn't keep to their goals.

Strava is another mobile social network application that lets you keep track of your activities using GPS and analyze your performance through metrics such as speed and distance. Using the social network, you can meet other individuals who are also into the same activities as you and find out about new track routes or challenges or other athletic content.

=== Mobile commerce ===
Mobile commerce, or m-commerce, is a branch of e-commerce, that is available in a form of apps and mobile sites. In some apps like letgo, it is easy for the buyer to talk to the seller about specifics about the product or negotiate the price and this assumes a form of social networking. It also narrows the search down by cities and topics to make it more efficient. Some major e-commerce sites, such as Amazon and eBay, are also available in apps, so that people can shop anytime and anywhere. Particularly, however, some mobile social media networks add m-commerce functionalities to their applications. For instance, there is the case of the Facebook Marketplace where people can sell and purchase products through their mobile devices. Many e-commerce and m-commerce applications are also increasingly developed to interface with other applications such as mobile payment, banking, and ticketing applications so customers can easily pay or accept payments. There is the case of Instagram, which in 2018 became open to merchants using the Shopify platform.

=== Mobile payments ===
Mobile payment social networks such as Venmo and Square Cash allow for person-to-person money transfer between family and friends, with a swipeable feed of payment details similar to Facebook's News Feed.

== Facebook mobile social networking ==
The rise of the digital age has made social media a lasting trend, Facebook is still the leader of social networks, were initially as web-based and then extended towards access via mobile browsers and smartphone apps. Compared with Twitter, Instagram, and Pinterest, Facebook continues to dominate the social media world. As of the fourth quarter of 2015, 823 million Facebook users accessed the social network exclusively through mobile device, exceed from 526 million users in the previous year. In 2016, there was Instagram started as mobile and later developed into web-based platforms as well. In 2016, there was practically 1.6 billion active users around the world. Moreover, in the United States, a study named the usage of the most popular mobile social networking percentages showed that social media audiences spent a total of 230 billion minutes on Facebook in 2014, 80% higher than Instagram. Until January 2016, 52% of users in North America accessed social media through mobile when the global mobile social penetration rate was 27%. The report in 2017 showed that around 1 billion users will visit Facebook via mobile devices and during this year, the US market plays a significant role with nearly 80% of Facebook users using mobile devices to access their accounts. Facebook mobile advertising revenue account for 10 billion dollars and occupy for 74% of revenue in total. It shows that by 2018, more than 75% of the Facebook users worldwide will access the service via their mobile phones.

== Safety issues ==
Safety issues, including security, privacy, and trust, in mobile social networks are concerned about the condition of being protected against different types of failure, damage, error, accidents, harm or any other non-desirable event, while mobile carriers contact each other in mobile environments. However, lack of a protective infrastructure in these networks has turned them in to more vulnerable targets for various risks. This is the main impulse why mobile social networks carry disparate and intricate safety concerns and divergent safety problems.

There has been cases where a user was caused bodily harm through mobile social media. For example, Kurt Eichenwald was sent a tweet with a flashing animated image by another user who knew that Eichenwald had epilepsy, causing a seizure. As a result of these dangers, many mobile social networks such as Twitter and Facebook have implemented various methods for protecting user safety such as removing harmful users, detecting malware, and verifying a user's identity; however, these policies are still in the workings.

Other than online safety issues, the evolution of mobile devices has also introduced new offline, or physical, safety concerns. The distractions caused by mobile social networks have cause numerous accidents due to the user not paying attention to their surroundings. According to the National Safety Council, nearly 330,000 injuries occur each year from accidents where the driver was texting while driving. The safety issues caused by distractions from mobile social network became more prominent after the release of Pokémon Go in July 2016. In Pokémon Go, users can catch Pokémon while walking around outdoors on their phones. While this game has positive impacts such as getting players to exercise, increasing museum and theme park visitors, and helping single people find dates, it has also led to more accidents. In California, two men fell over 40 feet from an ocean bluff while playing Pokémon Go. In Auburn, a driver went off the road and hit a tree because he was playing Pokémon Go while driving. In Pittsburgh, a teenager crossed a highway to catch a Pokémon and was hit by a car because she was distracted.

Another safety concern arose from mobile dating applications such as Tinder and Hinge, where single people are matched up with each other to go on dates. These environments make it much easier for criminals to commit crimes such as rape and murder because it is difficult for users to completely know the other person before agreeing to meet them face to face. In England and Wales, there were 204 reported crimes due to Tinder or Grindr in 2014. This number rose to 412 in 2015. On November 23, 2016, Stephen Port was convicted for rape and murder of 4 men whom he met on the Grindr. In April 2016, Ingrid Lyne was murdered and her accused murderer was a man she had met on a dating app. While there are many dangers to meeting people online, it has also successfully helped single people find love and marriage. Increasing the safety procedures regarding mobile dating applications is an ongoing work by the police force and by the developers of these mobile applications.

== In the United States ==
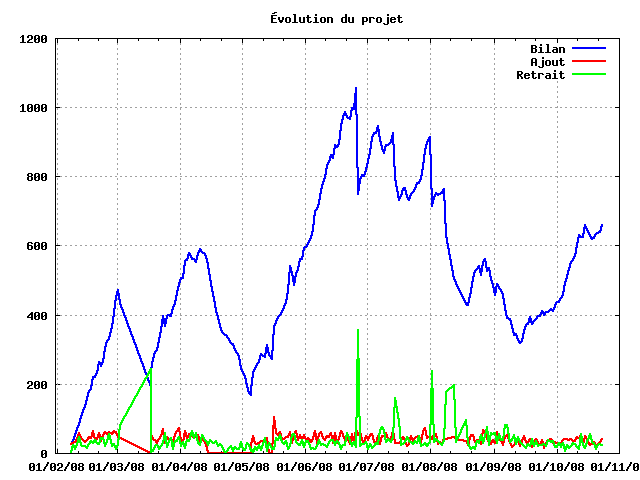
United States mobile social networking market

While Japan, Korea, and China have a higher usage rate of mobile social networks compared to other western countries, the United States is a prevalent user of mobile social networks. The US has a population of 303.82 million people and a mobile penetration of 72% with 219.73 million mobile subscribers in 2008. Informa forecasts the number of mobile subscribers to rise to 243.27 million by 2013.

The mobile data market in the US is at a developed stage of growth where non-messaging data revenues account for 20% of US operators' overall data revenues. In September 2012, the CTIA (Cellular Telephone Industries Association) announced that data service revenues rose 40% to US$14.8 billion. The CTIA announced that SMS usage had maintained its strong growth.

Social networking once began in the online space, but it has rapidly spread to mobile platforms. Currently, consumption of mobile internet usage is being driven by mobile social networking. Data shows that the US has 220.14 million online internet users which is 72.5% of the population. Flat-rate data plans have been prevalent in the US for a number of years but the customer adoption of mobile internet was slow until 2008. However, the introduction of the iPhone has definitely increased the market for mobile internet. iPhones have transformed the mobile social network market, and today there is numerous mobile development for social network apps.

The US mobile social networking market experienced steady growth in 2008 with 6.4 million mobile social network users. Since then, the number of mobile users has continued to grow and below is graph forecasting the growth until 2013. According to Statista.com, the most popular social media networking app as of 2016 is Facebook at 123.55 million monthly users, surpassing the next most popular app, Facebook Messenger, which has 97.86 million monthly users.

== See also ==
- Geosocial networking
- Mobile community
- Opportunistic mobile social networks
- Social network service

== Bibliography ==
- Cao, Jinwei; Basoglu, Kamile Asli; Sheng, Hong; Lowry, Paul Benjamin (2015). "A Systematic Review of Social Networks Research in Information Systems: Building a Foundation for Exciting Future Research". Communications of the Association for Information Systems. 36. doi:10.17705/1CAIS.03637.
- Lai, Chih-Hui (2007). "Understanding the Design of Mobile Social Networking: The Example of EzMoBo in Taiwan". M/C Journal. 10 (1). doi:10.5204/mcj.2607.
- Lugano, Giuseppe (2008). "Mobile social networking in theory and practice". First Monday. 13 (11). doi:10.5210/fm.v13i11.2232.
- Powers, William, Hamlet’s Blackberry : a practical philosophy for building a good life in the digital age, 1st ed., New York : Harper, 2010. ISBN 978-0-06-168716-7
- Raento, Mika; Antti Oulasvirta (2008). "Designing for privacy and self-presentation in social awareness". Personal and Ubiquitous Computing. 12 (7): 527–542. doi:10.1007/s00779-008-0200-9. S2CID 17184697.
