= Mobile community =

Group of people

A mobile community is a group of people generally united by shared interests or goals who interact:

- considering their context (e.g. time, space, social),
- by means of location-independent information technology,
- and also including mobile access to existing community infrastructures.

== See also ==
- Community
- Mobile computing
- Mobile identity
- Mobile identity management
- Mobile social network
- Tribe (Internet)
