= Mobimii =

Discontinued mobile social network

mobimii
- Website type: social networking
- Available in: English
- Owner: Fontera
- Website: http://www.mobimii.com/
- Commercial: Yes
- Registration: required
- Launched: March 2007
- Current status: Active

mobimii was a free mobile social networking service that is available on multiple platforms, the World Wide Web, WAP and as a Java ME downloadable application

== History ==
In March 2007, Fontera, the mobile marketing company launched Mobimii, a mobile social utility.

== Business model ==
Mobimii is an off-portal site which means there is no collaboration between Mobimii and any mobile network operator. Site access and usage is free, operator's data transfer charges excluded.

Mobimii is funded by mobile advertising. Mobile web banners and text links are shown throughout the site, full color full screen splash ads are displayed each time the Java ME application is launched and messages of up to 80 characters are included in any SMS text messages sent out by Mobimii.

== Features ==
Mobiimii started off as a mobile social network, but became more focused on facilitating mobile connectivity to existing Instant Messaging platforms and bigger social networks (like Facebook and Myspace). The main feature is the downloadable Java ME application that allows all users to interact with one another. The application lets users communicate with their IM contacts (including MSN Messenger, GTalk, ICQ), social networking friends and other Mobimii users with a single login.

Mobimii also offers photo galleries for users to post and share their pictures directly from their camera phones, as well as a free mobile content service with thousands of ringtones, wallpapers, screensavers, videos and approximately 2,500 free mobile games.

Users are able to access their social networking profiles and can set up a combined mobile feed made up of all of their social network feeds. In some countries free SMS is also offered to users.

== Technology ==
The site is available on all Java ME and mobile internet enabled phones anywhere in the world as well as on the World Wide Web for those who don't have phones, or are not within coverage range.

== Collaborations ==
Fontera has now started licensing the Mobimii software and it is currently being used by Soccer Laduma, Thunda.com, SABC and other companies. Each partner site is set up using the Mobimii software as a base with customer specific components added to the sites.

== See also ==
- Mobile Web
- Mobile advertising
- Mobile Marketing
- List of social networking websites
