= Mobile signature roaming =

In mobile telecommunications technology, the concept of mobile signature roaming means an access point (AP) should be able to get a mobile signature from any end-user, even if the AP and the end-user have not contracted a commercial relationship with the same MSSP. Otherwise, an AP would have to build commercial terms with as many MSSPs as possible, and this might be a cost burden.

This means that a mobile signature transaction issued by an application provider should be able to reach the appropriate MSSP, and this should be transparent for the AP.

Mobile signature roaming itself requires commercial agreements between the entities that facilitate it. In this respect, we assume that various entities (including MSSPs) will join in order to define common commercial terms and rules corresponding to a mobile signature roaming Service. This is the concept of a mobile signature roaming service.

== Entities involved ==
- Acquiring Entity (AE): an entity performing this role is one of the entry points of the mesh, and handles commercial agreements with APs. The entry point in the mesh may be for instance a MSSP, or an aggregator of Application Providers in the context of a particular communities of interests (e.g. payment associations, banks, MNOs etc.). That's the reason why we define this more abstract role. An Acquiring Entity implements the Web Service Interface specified in TS 102 204 [8];
- Home MSSP (HMSSP): this is the MSSP that is able to deal with the current end-user and the current transaction;
- Routing Entity (RE): any entity that facilitates the communication between the AE and the home MSSP;
- Attribute Provider: this role is described by Liberty Alliance [3]. One or several mesh members may undertake this role and store relevant attributes in order to facilitate the discovery of the Home MSSP by other Mesh members;
- Identity Issuer: an entity that is able to make a link between a Mobile Signature and an end user's identity. Within a PKI system, this is typically the certificate authority (CA) and/or a registration authority (RA);
- Verifying Entity (VE): an entity that can verify a Mobile Signature. A MSSP may be a Verifying Entity as well;
- Acquiring MSSP (AMSSP): this is a MSSP acting as an entry point in the Mesh. We can imagine that a commercial model for a mobile Signature Roaming Service is a Mesh of MSSPs which are fully or partially connected between each others.

== First mobile signature roaming transactions ==
- 13 April 2005 "Finnet and TeliaSonera Finland Performed Successful MSS Roaming"
- 7 February 2007 "World's first international Mobile Signature Roaming - with ETSI-MSS by Valimo (Finland) and BBS (Norway)"
