= Caldbeck =

Village in Cumbria, England

Coordinates: 54.73°N 3.05°W

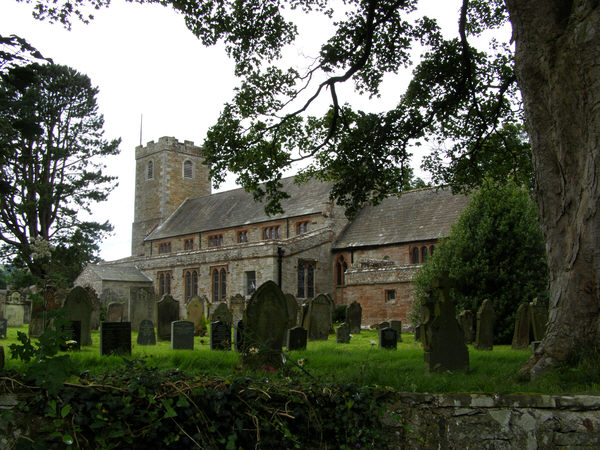
- St Kentigern's Church, Caldbeck

- Location in Allerdale, Cumbria Location within Cumbria
- Population: 714 (2001)
- OS grid reference: NY323377
- Civil parish: Caldbeck
- Unitary authority: Cumberland
- Ceremonial county: Cumbria
- Region: North West
- Country: England
- Sovereign state: United Kingdom
- Post town: WIGTON
- Postcode district: CA7
- Dialling code: 016974
- Police: Cumbria
- Fire: Cumbria
- Ambulance: North West
- UK Parliament: Penrith and Solway

Caldbeck is a village and civil parish in Cumbria, England, historically within Cumberland, it is situated within the Lake District National Park. Part of the parish lies within the Skiddaw Group SSSI (Site of Special Scientific Interest). The village had 714 inhabitants according to the census of 2001.

Caldbeck is closely associated with neighbouring village Hesket Newmarket, which is 1.5 mi (2 km) to the east. The nearest town is Wigton, 7.8 mi (13 km) north west of the village, Carlisle is 13.8 mi (22 km) to the north, Cockermouth is 17 mi (27 km) to the south and Penrith is 15.7 mi (25 km) to the east.

The parish church is dedicated to St. Kentigern.

Caldbeck's closest fell is High Pike.

== Toponymy ==
" 'The cold stream'; ON 'kaldr', 'bekkr'. The village and parish are named from the 'Cald Beck'..." (ON=Old Norse). " 'bekkr'...is the usual Lakeland name for 'stream', occurring some 200 times...", normally written as beck.

== Caldbeck transmitting station ==
The Caldbeck transmitting station is 2 mi (3 km) outside of the village. The Caldbeck transmitting station is a 1,106 feet (337 m) television and radio broadcasting station that covers most of northern Cumbria and south west Scotland.

Also located further outside the village is the Sandale transmitting station.

== Governance ==
The village is in the parliamentary constituency of Penrith and Solway.

For Local Government purposes it is in the Cumberland unitary authority area.

Caldbeck along with neighbouring village Hesket Newmarket, has its own parish council, Caldbeck Parish Council.

== Northern Fells Group ==
Prince Charles has visited the village several times in recent times, overseeing the launch of the Northern Fells Rural Project, and in later years the end of the project, which became the Northern Fells Group.

== Transport ==
The village is served by bus route 553 from Keswick going to Carlisle operated by Stagecoach.

== Sport ==
The opening stage of the Tour of Britain Women's cycle race passed through Caldbeck in 2026.

== Notable people ==
- Chris Bonington, the climber lives in the village
- Julia Marlowe, the American Shakespearean actress was born in Caldbeck, daughter of the 1860s village shoemaker.
- John Peel, the huntsman is Caldbeck's most infamous/famous former resident, his grave is in the local churchyard.
- Eddie Stobart
- Edward Stobart
- William Stobart

== See also ==
- Listed buildings in Caldbeck
- German mines at Caldbeck
- Eddie Stobart Logistics
- Stobart Group
- Callbeck
