= Roaming SIM =

A roaming SIM is a mobile phone SIM card that operates on more than one network within its home country. Roaming SIMs currently have two main applications, the least cost call routing for roaming mobile calls and machine to machine.

Using a normal network locked SIM, travelers can use their own roaming enabled mobile phone in any country that has a roaming agreement with their home network, or for global networks like Vodafone, with another Vodafone OpCo. This manifests itself to most users when they receive a text message welcoming the traveler to a local network. Once they return home, their SIM will only work on the network with which they have a contract.

A roaming SIM however, also known as a global roaming SIM, will work with whichever network it can detect, at home or abroad.

== Roaming mobile calls ==
The use of roaming SIM cards in its most common form is in normal voice applications such as mobile phone calls. The common application of roaming SIMs for voice is where mobile calls are automatically routed to, and made on, the least cost network. This typically means that incoming calls are free, no matter which network a mobile user is on. This also means that a caller enjoys the lowest cost when making a call, significantly reducing call costs, especially compared to normal network charges for International Roaming.

Global roaming SIMs are very often combined with callback technology, whereby the user dials a number in the normal way, but the call is intercepted by an application on the SIM card and turned from an outbound call to an inbound call which the user answers. This ensures that the call travels exclusively through the least cost route, and also it is taking advantage of the fact that inbound call charges are typically lower than outbound ones.

Some providers achieve this automatic call interception and callback by encoding a program onto the SIM card.

Other providers use Multi-IMSI (International Mobile Subscriber Identity) technology to lower the cost of roaming. In this case, there is a program on the SIM card that selects the lowest cost IMSI (or 'profile') to use in a specific country.

Increasingly, data services are being added to roaming SIM cards to reduce the cost of roaming data charges. Mobile users are increasingly using data services, and it can be very difficult to predict the cost of using data because it is invoiced based on volume.

== Machine to machine ==
This technology is also used in various machine to machine (M2M) applications where devices communicate directly, such as vehicle tracking systems, smart meters, and industrial monitoring. By seamlessly switching between multiple networks, it ensures more comprehensive coverage, even in remote areas, while minimizing costs through least-cost routing, which selects the most economical network available.

== Alternatives ==
For some applications (particularly where regular travel between two countries is the main purpose) a Dual SIM can be considered as an alternative. They have the advantage that it is possible to buy a local SIM card and use that next to the primary SIM card.

Voice over IP apps (softphones) may be installed on smartphones to inexpensively call international numbers. As these use Wi-Fi where available, costs may be substantially lower. Voice quality using VoIP for international calls may vary.
