= Hesket Newmarket =

Village in Cumbria, England

Coordinates: 54.738°N 3.027°W

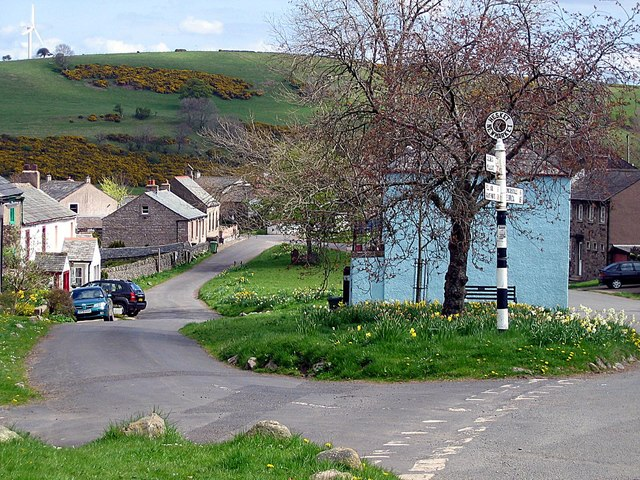
- Hesket Newmarket village green

- Location in Allerdale, Cumbria Location within Cumbria
- OS grid reference: NY338386
- Civil parish: Caldbeck
- Unitary authority: Cumberland
- Ceremonial county: Cumbria
- Region: North West
- Country: England
- Sovereign state: United Kingdom
- Post town: WIGTON
- Postcode district: CA7
- Dialling code: 016974
- Police: Cumbria
- Fire: Cumbria
- Ambulance: North West
- UK Parliament: Penrith and Solway

Hesket Newmarket is a small village in Cumbria, England, historically within Cumberland. It is on the opposite side of Skiddaw to Keswick within the Lake District National Park.

Hesket Newmarket is closely associated with neighbouring village Caldbeck, which is 1.5 mi (2 km) to the west. The nearest town is Wigton, 9.2 mi (15 km) north west of the village, Carlisle is 13.9 mi (22 km) to the north, Cockermouth is 18 mi (29 km) to the south and Penrith is 14.2 mi (23 km) to the east.

== Economy ==
Hesket Newmarket was the original base of Carlisle based haulage giant Eddie Stobart Logistics.

The village has two social enterprises, a co-operatively owned pub, the Old Crown Inn and a co-operatively owned brewery, the Hesket Newmarket Brewery.

== Toponymy ==
The name is recorded in 1227 as Eskeheued, pointing to Old Norse eski = ash (tree) + Anglo-Saxon hēafod = "ash-head" = "hill with ash trees on", and not the usual origin of placenames Hesket and Hesketh.

== Governance ==
The village is in the parliamentary constituency of Penrith and Solway.

For Local Government purposes it is in the Cumberland unitary authority district.

Hesket Newmarket along with neighbouring village Caldbeck, has its own parish council, Caldbeck Parish Council.

== Notable people ==
- Eddie Stobart (1929–2024)
- Edward Stobart (1954–2011)
- William Stobart (born 1961)

== Brewery ==
The village has its own brewery; Hesket Newmarket Brewery which was founded in 1987, at the back of the Old Crown Inn. Chris Bonington sent a message from Kathmandu to officially open the pub.

The first beer, Blencathra Bitter, was launched in March 1988, other beers include Doris' 90th Birthday Ale.

Today the brewery is owned by Hesket Newmarket Brewery Co-operative Ltd, which was established to acquire ownership of the brewery. The Prince of Wales visited the pub in 2004 to honour its achievements.

== See also ==
- Listed buildings in Caldbeck
- Stobart Group
