= Called Back =

Called Back may refer to:

- Called Back (novel), an 1883 mystery/romance novel written by Frederick John Fargus under the pseudonym Hugh Conway
- Called Back (1911 film), a 1911 Australian film based on a play which was adapted from the novel
- Called Back (1914 British film), a silent film directed by George Loane Tucker
- Called Back (1914 American film), a silent film directed by Otis Turner
- Called Back (1933 film), a film by Reginald Denham

== See also ==
- Callback (disambiguation)
