= Callback (telecommunications) =

Phone call by the receiver to the originator of a previous call

In telecommunications, a callback or call-back occurs when the originator of a phone call is called by the original receiver in a subsequent call.

== International calling ==
A callback, in this sense is a method of making low-cost international calls via a third country, usually the United States, where call charges are considerably lower. One variation of this technology was developed by IDT Corporation in 1991. IDT Corp used a hardware solution that was never widely accepted and ultimately failed and was surpassed by a software solution concurrently developed by Jorge Blanco at MCI Telecommunications for The United Nations Development Programme and their staff Wolfgang Scholtes and Kumar Navaratnum.

In order to use a callback service, a subscriber is allocated a unique number in, for example, the US, which must first be dialled in order to trigger a return call. This is known (in the US) as a Direct Inbound Dialing (DID) number, or in the UK as a Direct Dial-In (DDI) number. Where Caller ID is available, it may be possible to use the same DID number for many different subscribers, as the callback system will be able to recognise each subscriber's registered number.

On hearing a ringing tone, the subscriber simply hangs up and awaits the callback. On receiving this, usually within a few seconds, the customer picks up the phone and dials the required number. This may mean dialling in the North American format, as most callback services are US-based, and callers are effectively calling from the US. For example, a number in Manhattan would be dialled with the trunk code, area code and subscriber's number, as follows:

1 212 xxx xxxx

A call to London in the UK, would require the international access code and country calling code, as follows:

011 44 20 xxxx xxxx

In the North American Numbering Plan, 011 is used as the international access code, but in most countries, 00 is used, in line with International Telecommunication Union's Recommendation E.164.

The cost of making a telephone call via callback consists of two parts, as the caller is effectively paying for an outbound and inbound call at the same time. For example, if a customer from Spain is calling a phone number in Australia, and it costs 8 cents per minute to phone Spain from the US (the callback, which is an incoming call) and 20 cents per minute to phone Australia from the US (the destination call, which is an outgoing call), then the caller will pay a total of 28 US cents a minute. This may still be less expensive than calling directly from Spain to Australia, which is primarily why callbacks are used.

== Automated applications ==
Callback is often automated through the use of web callback or mobile phone applications by companies such as GlobalTel and Jajah, or on Roaming SIMs.

=== Legal status of callback ===
Many countries have banned callback services, on the grounds that they are not licensed or regulated by their governments, and deprive telephone companies in many developing countries of revenue from international calls. People who provide or use callback services have argued that these telephone companies are often state monopolies that charge unjustifiably high prices for international calls. It may also be the only way of making calls to certain countries from others, for example, Israel from other Middle Eastern countries.

Other countries have sought to use technical means to prevent callback, by blocking the inbound and outbound calls made to and from DID numbers, or by disabling touch tone dialing. However, this is also overcome by the use of speed dial numbers, while others use these services by triggering callback via the Internet or SMS.

The use of callback in most developed countries has declined, owing to the liberalization of telecommunication services, which allow more direct access to low-cost international calls, without the need for a time-consuming process like callback. Also, the advent of Voice over Internet Protocol services has allowed many people to make international calls via their computer connected to the Internet, although sound quality can be poorer on slower dial-up connections than on broadband ones.

International callback has been credited with opening global telecom markets because it enabled competition to start up even if regulatory restrictions existed. It was popularized by a 1994 book, "The International CallBack Book" by Gene Retske.

== Modem security ==
A modem allows one computer (the client) to establish a connection to another (the server) by dialing the server's telephone number. This is sometimes viewed as being insecure because there is no authentication of the call originator. One way to increase security is to enforce a modem callback protocol, which usually proceeds as a series of steps:

1. The client computer calls the server computer.
2. After a greeting the client identifies itself, usually with a user name.
3. The server then disconnects the call.
4. Based upon the user name and a list of users' phone numbers, the server will then establish a second call back to the client computer.
5. The client computer, expecting this returned call, will then answer and communications between the two computers will proceed normally.

Sometimes callback modem setups can also be used for billback purposes, allowing the originator to avoid lengthy toll charges.

== See also ==
- Automatic ring back, to an engaged number, sometimes referred to as callback
- Web Callback
