= TADIG code =

TADIG code is a number uniquely identifying network operators in a GSM mobile network. The acronym TADIG expands to "Transferred Account Data Interchange Group". According to the GSM specification, the codes are used as "primary identifiers within file contents and file names" in multiple file formats defined by the GSMA. Network operators are required to register new codes and limit themselves to using code already registered with the GSMA.

TADIG codes are generally used by bilateral agreement for the purposes of billing roaming telephone calls.

== Format ==
A TADIG code is 5 characters long, consisting of

1. Three-character country code. This is usually the ISO 3166-1 alpha-3 code for terrestrial operators. Non-terrestrial operators have the first two characters as AA. Wi-Fi operators have the first two characters as WW.
2. Two-character operator/ company identifier

=== Example ===
TADIG code: CANGW (for Freedom Mobile, formerly WIND Mobile)

Country Code	Operator/ Company identifier
CAN (for Canada)	GW (for Globalive Wireless, the original parent company of Freedom)

TADIG code: SWE01 (for the Sweden1 bilateral Roaming Hub)

Country Code	Operator/ Company identifier
SWE (for Sweden)	01

TADIG code: USAHI (for Mobi)

Country Code	Operator/ Company identifier
USA (for the United States)	HI (unofficially for Hawaiʻi, where Mobi is a regional wireless carrier)

== Notable exceptions ==
The GSMA specification lists the following in their list of "known issues" as discrepancies between codes registered with them against ones actually being used

- US territories are not always represented in the USA
- YUG continues to be used as country code by operators in Montenegro and Serbia. Each now has its own ISO code, MNE and SRB respectively
- Kosovo is not recognised as a country within the ITU. As a placeholder, the value K00 is used to represent the country
