= Callbeck =

Callbeck is a surname; belonging to a number of political figures associated with Prince Edward Island, Canada

== List of people with the surname ==
- Catherine Callbeck (born 1939), Canadian politician, former Premier of Prince Edward Island
- Henry Callbeck (1818 – January 29, 1898), Canadian politician
- Phillips Callbeck (1744 – January 28, 1790), Irish-Canadian merchant, lawyer and political figure

== See also ==
- Caldbeck
- Callback (disambiguation)
