= Mobile Electronic Signature Consortium =

Mobile Electronic Signature Consortium (mSign) was founded in 1999 and comprised 35 member companies. In October 2000, the consortium published an XMl-interface defining a protocol allowing service providers to obtain a mobile (digital) signature from a mobile phone subscriber.

In 2001, mSign gained industry-wide coverage when it became apparent that Brokat, a company of one of the founders, also obtained a process patent in Germany for using the mobile phone to generate digital signatures.

== Technologies used ==
The mSign consortium created the standards on the assumption that a WAP phone with a WAP 1.2 implementation and digital keys stored on the SIM card (i.e. WIM) would be used to generate a mobile (digital) signature. During the standardization process, room was given also to other mechanisms for authenticating the mobile phone subscriber such as the sending of a password via SMS or Dialtone communication and voice identification. The specification also allowed for server-based digital signatures. In other words, digital signatures not generated in the mobile phone but on a central server that would then communicate with the signature requesting Service Providers via the mSign interface.

== Founding members ==
The founding members were Siemens, E-Plus Mobilfunk, Mannesmann Mobilfunk, T-Mobile, VIAG Interkom, Schlumberger, Gemplus, T-Telesec, Trust Center of Deutsche Telekom, cv cryptovision and Brokat AG.

== Other members ==
Later members include Advance Bank, Bank of Tokyo-Mitsubishi Ltd., Cable & Wireless HKT, Carticom Corporation, Credit Agricole Indosuiez Luxembourg, EXCELSIS Informationssysteme GmbH, fun communications GmbH, Hewlett-Packard GmbH, Hypo Vereinsbank, IIS/GlobalSign Greece SA, InterCard POS–Service GmbH, ITFinity Solutions, Mitsubishi Electric Corporation, MyAlert.com, NSE Software AG, ORGA Kartensysteme GmbH, PAGO eTransaction Services GmbH & Co. KG, payitmobile AG i.G., RCM Technologies (Operational Headquarter, Siemens AG, ICP CD M EBO, SONERA SMARTTRUST GmbH, TC TrustCenter GmbH, WAYS INDIA Ltd. and West LB.

== Sources ==
- Uwe Mittelstaedt: Referat im Rahmen des SBWL-Seminars „MCommerce“ im Wintersemester 2000/01 "Die Teilnahme an und die Gestaltung von Standardisierungsprozessen" http://www.is-frankfurt.de/veranstaltung/SBWL-WS00-01/thema7_referate/mittelstaedt/Seminiararbeit%20Thema%207.htm#_ftn20
- Announcement that Brokat has obtained a patent, 19.2.2001

http://www.golem.de/0102/12415.html

- TuvIT Arbeitspapier: "Mobile elektronische Signatur", Dec. 2002

https://web.archive.org/web/20110718230627/http://mediakomm.difu.de/documents/forschung/mobile---signatur.pdf
