= St Kentigern's Church, Caldbeck =

Coordinates: 54.7495°N 3.0495°W

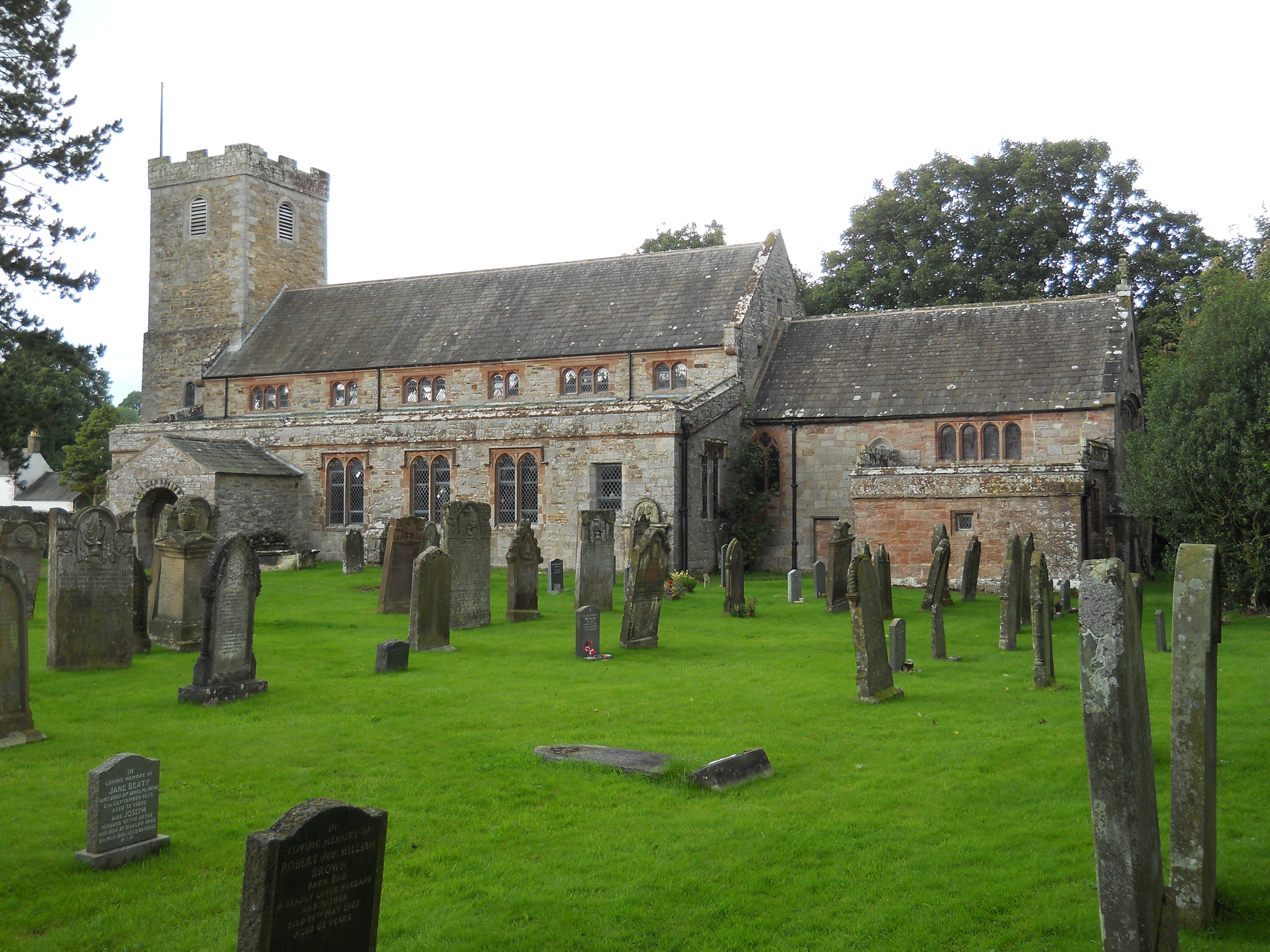
- St Kentigern's Church, Caldbeck, from the south

- Location in Cumbria
- OS grid reference: NY 325 398
- Location: Caldbeck, Cumbria
- Country: England
- Denomination: Anglican
- Website: St Kentigern, Caldbeck

History
- Status: Parish church
- Dedication: Saint Kentigern (Saint Mungo)

Architecture
- Functional status: Active
- Heritage designation: Grade I
- Designated: 11 April 1967
- Architectural type: Church
- Style: Norman, Gothic
- Groundbreaking: 12th century
- Completed: 1932

Specifications
- Materials: Body sandstone Tower limestone with sandstone quoins, Roof green slate

Administration
- Province: York
- Diocese: Carlisle
- Archdeaconry: Carlisle
- Deanery: Carlisle
- Parish: Caldbeck

Clergy
- Vicar: Revd Eileen Reid

St Kentigern's Church, (or St Mungo's Church), is in the village of Caldbeck, Cumbria, England. It is an active Anglican parish church in the deanery of Carlisle, the archdeaconry of Carlisle and the diocese of Carlisle. The church is recorded in the National Heritage List for England as a designated Grade I listed building. It is dedicated to Saint Kentigern, whose alternative name is Saint Mungo; hence the church's alternative title of Caldbeck, St Mungo.

== History ==
The earliest fabric of church dates from the 12th and 13th centuries. It was built on the site of a previous church dating from the 6th century. Alterations, including rebuilding of the chancel and the addition of a chantry chapel, were made in 1512 by John Whelpdale, and in 1727 a further stage was added to the tower. In 1880 the church was restored by C. J. Ferguson; this included the timber roof of the chancel. A further restoration was carried out in 1932 by J. F. Martindale, including new windows in the aisles and clerestory and the open timber roof in the nave.

== Architecture ==
=== Exterior ===
The body of the church is constructed in sandstone blocks, and the tower is in limestone with sandstone quoins; the roof is covered in green slates. It has coped gables and on the east gable is a cross finial. Its plan consists of a six-bay nave with north and south aisles, a clerestory and a south porch, a two-bay chancel with a south vestry and a square west tower. The vestry was originally the chantry chapel. The tower has three stages. The lower two stages up to the string course date from the medieval period; the upper storey has an inscription giving the date of this as 1727. It contains louvred, round-arched bell openings, and is surmounted by a battlemented parapet. In the aisles are two-light windows with trefoil heads; one of these is original, the others are similar but date from the 1932 restoration. The clerestory contains two- and three-light windows that also date from 1932. In the chancel are two original windows and, at a lower level, a squint; over the vestry is a four-light window. The east window has five lights and an inscription to John Whelpdale. The opening from the tower into the nave is a Norman doorway that has been moved from elsewhere. Inside the porch is another Norman doorway, which again has been moved. Also in the porch is a medieval grave slab and a stoup for holy water. In the south wall is a blocked priest's door.

=== Interior ===
In the baptistry is a 14th-century hexagonal font. The south wall contains a piscina dating from the 13th century. On the west wall are the royal arms of George IV and a painted text dated 1731. The stained glass in the east window was made by William Wailes and dates from 1867. It depicts events during the last days of Jesus. In the north aisle are two windows, one depicting Saint Kentigern and the other Saint Cuthbert; they were made by James Powell and Sons in 1938.

== External features ==
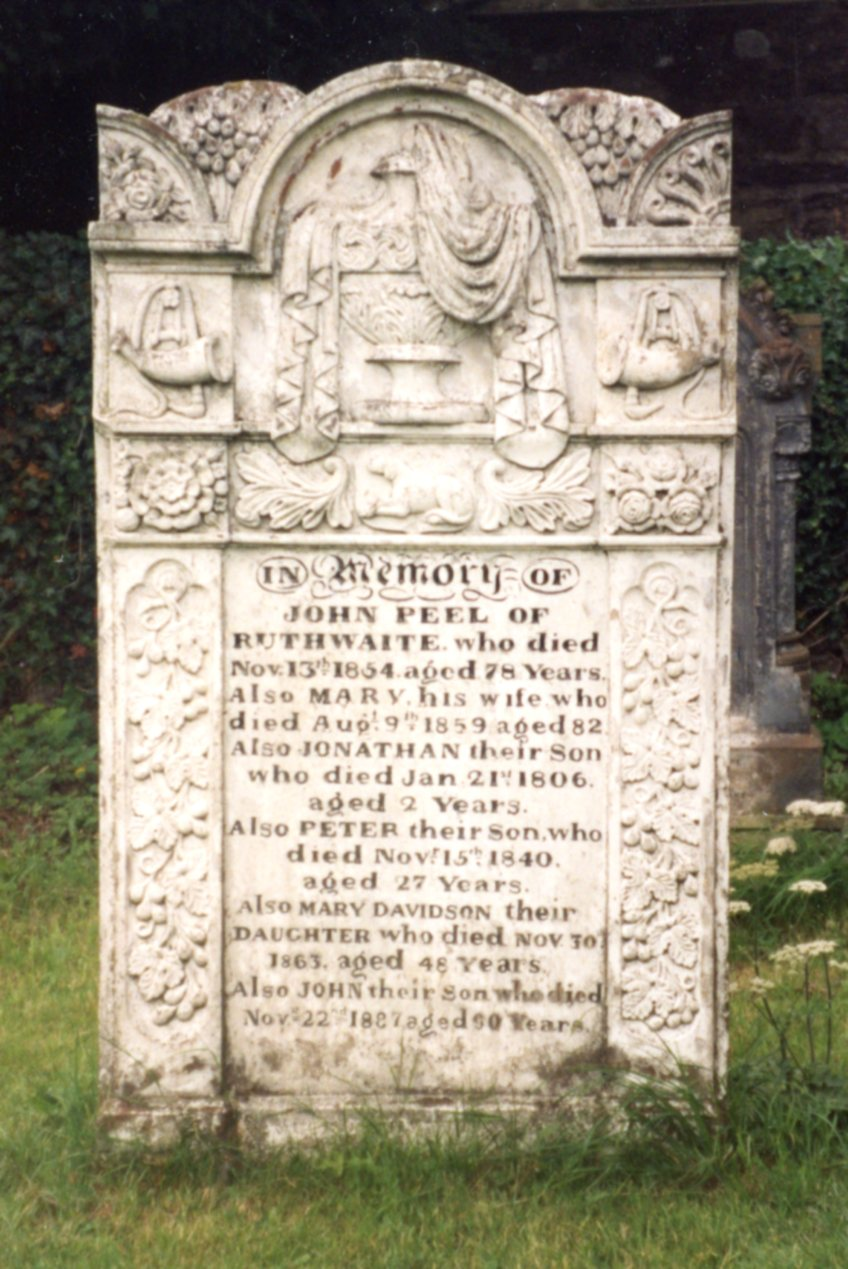
John Peel's headstone

Close to the church is St Mungo's well, a holy well where Christians were baptised in the 6th century. In the churchyard is the grave of John Peel, the local huntsman who is the subject of the song D'ye ken John Peel? Also buried in the church yard is Mary Robinson Harrison, also known as the Maid of Buttermere, or the Buttermere Beauty.

== See also ==
- Grade I listed buildings in Cumbria
- Listed buildings in Caldbeck
