= Opportunistic mobile social network =

Opportunistic mobile social networks are a form of mobile ad hoc networks that exploit the human social characteristics, such as similarities, daily routines, mobility patterns, and interests to perform the message routing and data sharing. In such networks, the users with mobile devices are able to form on-the-fly social networks to communicate with each other and share data objects.

== Definition ==
In recent years, opportunistic mobile social networks emerged as a new mechanism of communications in wireless networks. Unlike mobile ad hoc networks (MANETs) that require end-to-end communication paths for message exchange, the communication in opportunistic mobile social networks takes place on the establishment of opportunistic contacts among mobile nodes, without availability of end-to-end message routing paths. As the mobile devices can make contact only when humans come into contact, such networks are tightly coupled with human social networks. Therefore, the opportunistic mobile social networks exploit the human behaviors and social relationships to build more efficient and trustworthy message dissemination schemes.

== Opportunism in social networks ==
The GSMA estimates that as of January 2019, more than 5 billion people worldwide use mobile phones. That is more than half of the world's population. Most of the mobile phones in the current era are equipped with Wi-Fi, Bluetooth, cameras, sensors, and numerous other components. Moreover, most of the modern vehicles are also installed with communication interfaces and sensory equipment. Such a widespread use and availability of mobile communication devices create a huge number of contact opportunities among humans, and are key to the establishment of opportunistic mobile social networks. The human mobility is the key factor in opportunistic communications, and there could be delays in message transfers as long as the humans carrying mobile devices do not come into each other's transmission range. Therefore, several research projects are conducted in various parts of the world to analyze the human mobility and social interaction patterns, and on the basis of that to build efficient message routing models that incur minimum message delays.

== Social metrics ==
The most common social metrics that are widely utilized to build message communications by exploiting social networks are betweenness centrality, degree centrality, and closeness centrality. The betweenness centrality measures the extent a node appears on the shortest communication paths (taken by messages) among the other mobile devices. In specific terms, betweenness centrality quantifies the extent of information flow through the current node on the behalf of other nodes. In contrast, degree centrality gives a measurement of the direct interactions of a node with other nodes in an opportunistic mobile social network. The closeness centrality is regarded as a measure of information spread time from a given node to the other nodes in the network. Bubble Rap is a famous message routing scheme developed for opportunistic mobile social networks that exploits the aforementioned metrics to establish communications.

== Challenges ==
Opportunistic mobile social networks face numerous challenges due to the frequent disruptions and delays, and intermittent connectivity environment. One of the major challenges is the insecure communication in such networks, as due to the distributed nature, it is not possible to utilize mature security mechanisms, such as cryptography that requires centralized trusted authorities. Moreover, it is also difficult to maintain trust among the peer nodes due to the disconnected and decentralized environments. Data related to the reputation of the participating entities can be exchanged between them in order to build robust trust scores.

== Applications ==
There are numerous applications of opportunistic mobile social networks, and more applications are evolving as the smartphone technology is advancing.

=== Opportunistic computing ===
Opportunistic computing utilize the shared resources, content, services, applications, and computing resources, by the devices connected in an opportunistic mobile social network, to provide a platform for the execution of distributed computing tasks. However, opportunistic computing requires middleware services to cope with the intermittent connectivity and delay of the opportunistic communication environments. Also, participating entities need to be compensated and for that they should be able to negotiate the cost of opportunistic computing tasks and pay each other.

=== Recommender systems ===
A novel application area of opportunistic mobile social networks is the recommender systems. Such systems track the user activities, mobility patterns, and utilize the user's contextual information to provide recommendations on variety of items.

=== Mobile data offloading ===
An active area of research in the applications of opportunistic mobile social networks is the mobile data offloading. With large number of ever increasing smartphone users, most of the 3G networks are overloaded. Several research works are performed to utilize opportunistic mobile social networks in offloading of mobile data traffic to reduce the load on 3G networks.

== Simulators ==
There are numerous simulators available that are used to analyze and replay human mobility patterns extracted from the real traces collected through various experiments. Some simulators are capable of generating synthetic human mobility patterns, as well as can simulate real traces; a few examples are given below:

=== ONE ===
ONE is a Java-based simulator, and supports the simulation of realistic and synthetic mobility patterns. ONE simulator has many rich features for simulating opportunistic mobile social networks. //

=== LEPTON ===
LEPTON is a lightweight emulation platform for opportunistic networking systems. Like many simulators it can simulate the mobility of nodes based on synthetic models or real-world traces, and drive the communication between these nodes accordingly. Being an emulator, though, it makes it possible to run for each node a full-featured instance of an existing opportunistic networking system (such as DoDWAN, IBRDTN, or aDTN for example).
