= Edward Stobart (businessman, born 1954) =

British company owner (1954–2011)

Eddie Stobart
- Born: 21 November 1954; Hesket Newmarket, Cumberland, England
- Died: 31 March 2011 (aged 56); Coventry, West Midlands, England
- Occupation: Businessman
- Years active: 1969–2011 (his death)
- Organisation: Eddie Stobart Ltd (1973–2004)
- Title: CEO and Chairman
- Predecessor: Eddie Stobart
- Successor: William Stobart
- Spouse(s): Sylvia (divorced); 4 children Mandy (m. ???? – 2011, his death); 2 children
- Parent(s): Eddie Stobart and Nora Stobart

Edward Stobart (21 November 1954 – 31 March 2011) was a British haulage company owner who first became involved with his father's company aged 15 in 1969, and subsequently expanded it into one of the UK's most well known multimodal logistics companies, Stobart Group. Edward died on 31 March 2011 in a Coventry hospital of what was termed 'heart problems'.

== The Stobart group ==
In 1960, Stobart's father "Steady" Eddie Stobart founded the haulage business that became Eddie Stobart Ltd, then the Stobart Group. Stobart's father controlled the organisation fully until 1973, when, at the age of 19, Stobart took the place of CEO, while Rodney Baker-Bates was made COO. In 1976, Stobart's father retired and Stobart took the place of chairman, while Baker-Bates was made CEO and Andrew Tinkler was made COO. The company was distinguished by uniforms and clean trucks. By 1985 Stobart owned 26 vehicles but he would still personally wash the trucks.

In 1987, Baker-Bates resigned and Stobart's brother William took the place of CEO. However, in 1992, William also resigned, and so Alan Martin took the place of CEO. However, Martin was fired in 1997 after leading a court case against Stobart in order to receive more payments. Baker-Bates then returned and took the place of CEO again.

The executive line-up of the group remained with Stobart as chairman, Baker-Bates as CEO and Tinkler in COO until 2004 when, at the age of 50, Stobart retired, and made his brother William COO, promoting Baker-Bates to the part of chairman and Tinkler to the part of CEO.

== Death ==
On 31 March 2011, Stobart died very suddenly of a massive heart attack. He was rushed to hospital in Coventry but was pronounced dead on arrival. It was later revealed he was suffering from heart problems. Stobart's funeral service took place on 9 April at Carlisle Cathedral, followed by a private burial.

In May 2011 it was revealed that Stobart had considerable debts at the time of his death and had filed for bankruptcy in 2010.

He and his second wife Mandy had two children, Stobart also had four adopted children from his first marriage to Sylvia.

Business positions
Preceded by Eddie Stobart	CEO of Eddie Stobart Ltd; 1973–2011	Succeeded by William Stobart
Preceded by Eddie Stobart	Chairman of Eddie Stobart Ltd; 1976–2004	Succeeded by William Stobart
