= John Peel (huntsman) =

English huntsman (died 1854)

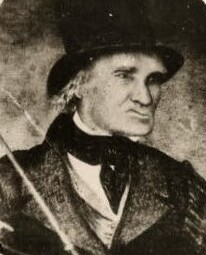
John Peel

John Peel (13 November 1776? – 13 November 1854) was an English huntsman who is the subject of the nineteenth century song "D'ye ken John Peel" - "ken" meaning 'to be aware of' or 'to know' in some dialects of the North of England and Scotland.

== Peel's life ==
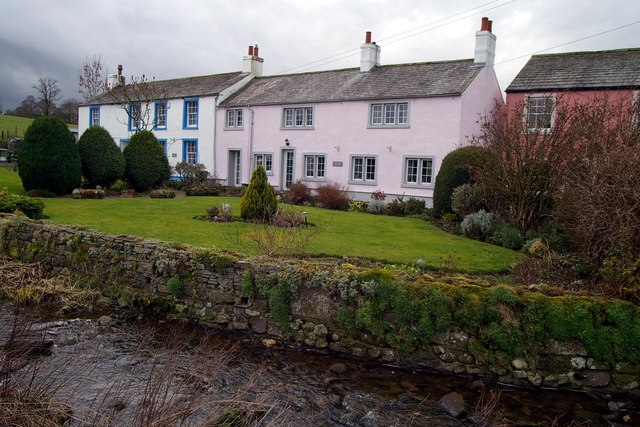
Caldbeck cottages, home of the huntsman John Peel. Caldbeck was a stopping place for travellers to whom the monks provided hospitality.

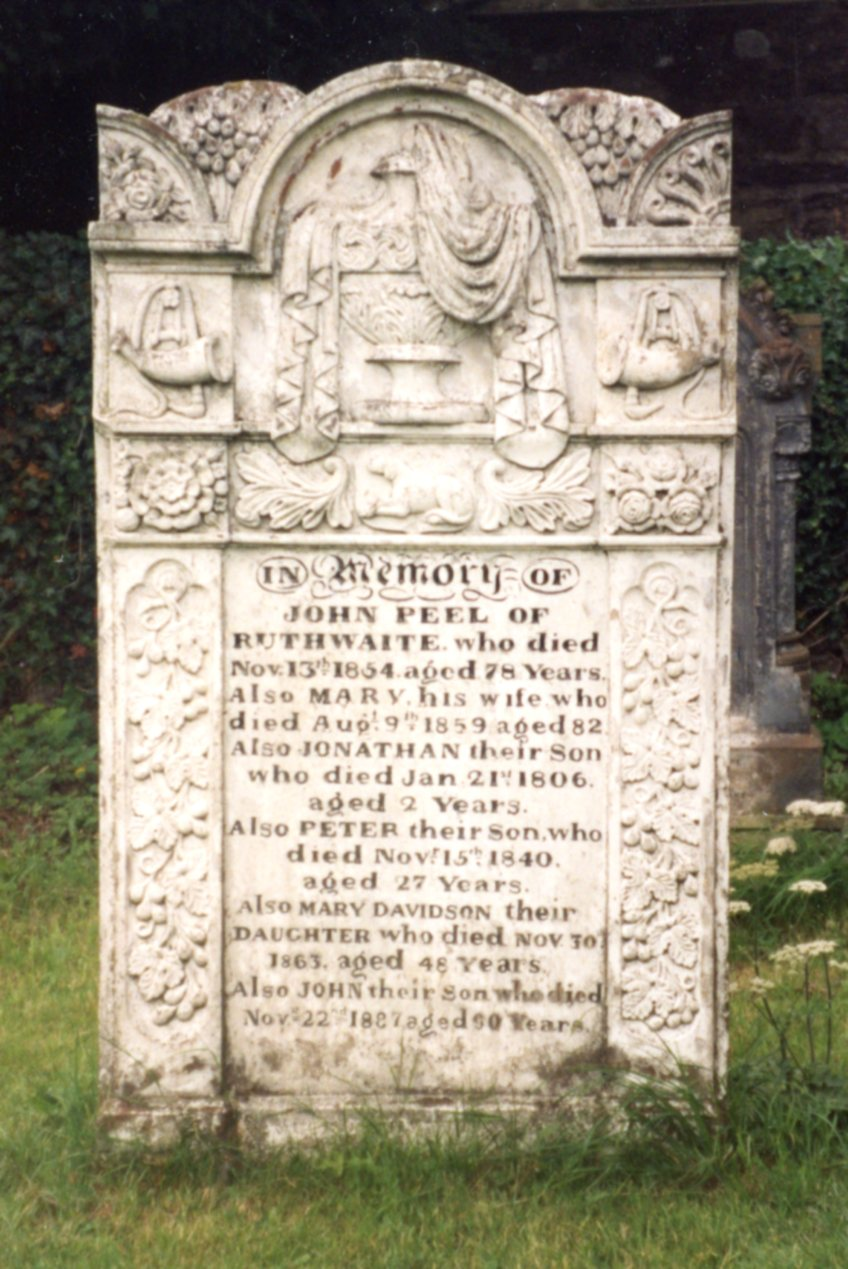
Headstone of John Peel in the churchyard of St Kentigern's Church, Caldbeck, Wigton, Cumbria

Peel was born at Park End, near Caldbeck, Cumberland; his family moved a short time after to the Greenrigg farm. He was baptised on 24 September 1777, but most sources suggest he was born the previous year. Peel married in 1797 to Mary White. Some of the White family's property at Ruthwaite (near Ireby) passed into his hands, which secured Peel a comfortable income. However, he was, as many of his friends admitted, prone to dissipation and he devoted himself primarily to hunting. Peel was a farmer by profession, and kept a pack of fox hounds. Peel hunted pine martens and hares in addition to foxes. By the end of his life (13 November 1854, most likely due to a fall while hunting) he had accrued large debts, which his friends helped pay off.

John Peel did occasionally ride to hounds, his mount being a 14 hand dun crossbred gelding named 'Dunny'. 'Dunny' would often be abandoned for hours during the hunt when the going became too rough to ride over, standing patiently waiting for his master to return.

Peel's niece Nancy Wilson (who was brought up in the Peel household) was also known to hunt with her Uncle John on horseback, 'mounted on a grey pony and garbed in a green habit', meaning she rode sidesaddle, which was the proper custom for ladies at the time. However Peel did on many occasions follow the old Cumberland custom, known as 'Chasing the Ace', chasing after the hounds on foot.

Peel became a moderately well-known figure, owing to the song written about him. Some of the local gentry, after his death, were glad to take on his sons as servants, and the story of Peel romanticized hunting activities for many. He died in 1854 and is buried in the churchyard of St Kentigern's Church, Caldbeck. In 1977 his grave was vandalised by anti-hunting activists.

Peel Region, the equivalent of a county in Ontario, Canada may be named after him.

It is believed that three inns were named after his hounds, Hark to Towler at Heywood, Hark to Bounty at Slaidburn, and the Hark to Bellman at Clitheroe in Lancashire. Residents now passed of the area have always understood that John Peel hunted in the Clitheroe district, later arriving by train to Chatburn railway station, with hounds and horses, and from there to the Bellman Inn (less than 1/2 mile) for a tot of whisky before going hunting. The railway opened in 1850, and the Bellman Inn was granted its first licence in 1826, but was known as the 'ancient hostelry of the Hark to Bellman' in 1832. There was also a racecourse very near the Bellman hostelry which ran from at least 1811 to 1839. The hound Bellman was also said to be a completely white hound. John Peel has a fact file in Tullie House Carlisle.
