= Subscription billing service =

A subscription period service is a system where consumers are charged on a predetermined time basis for products or services they receive. An example is a recurring monthly charge for access to newspaper archives. Other common uses include downloadable software, games, e-books, and digital downloads. Subscription billing services are also utilized by mobile app providers such as Apple's App Store.

== See also ==
- LEC billing
- Software as a service
