= Mobile identity management =

Online authentication systems

Mobile identity is a development of online authentication and digital signatures, where the SIM card of one's mobile phone works as an identity tool. Mobile identity enables legally binding authentication and transaction signing for online banking, payment confirmation, corporate services, and consuming online content. The user's certificates are maintained on the telecom operator's SIM card and in order to use them, the user has to enter a personal, secret PIN code. When using mobile identity, no separate card reader is needed, as the phone itself already performs both functions.

In contrast to other approaches, the mobile phone in conjunction with a mobile signature-enabled SIM card aims to offer the same security and ease of use as for example smart cards in existing digital identity management systems. Smart card-based digital identities can only be used in conjunction with a card reader and a PC. In addition, distributing and managing the cards can be logistically difficult, exacerbated by the lack of interoperability between services relying on such a digital identity.

There are a number of private company stakeholders that have an inherent interest in setting up a mobile signature service infrastructure to offer mobile identity services. These stakeholders are mobile network operators and, to a certain extent, financial institutions or service providers with an existing large customer base, that could leverage the use of mobile signatures across several applications.

== By country ==
=== Finland ===
The Finnish government has supervised the deployment of a common derivative of the ETSI-based mobile signature service standard, thus allowing the Finnish mobile operators to offer mobile signature services. The Finnish government certificate authority (CA) also issues the certificates that link the digital keys on the SIM card to the person's real world identity.

=== Iran ===
Through national mobile register program Iranian customs administration and ministry of ict registers database from IMEI of imported legally phones and allows Iranian citizens to only access full Iranian mobile phone operators national roaming network if they have linked their national ID to both Simcards and also non contraband/smuggled IMEI number.

=== Sweden ===
In the Nordic region, governments, public sector and financial institutions are increasingly offering online and mobile channels to access their services. In Sweden the WPK consortium, owned by banks and mobile operators, specifies a mobile signature service infrastructure that is used by banks to authenticate online banking users.

Telenor Sverige has provided technology for the company's mobile signature services in Sweden since 2009. Telenor enables its customers a secure login to online services using their mobile phone for authentication and digital signing.

=== Estonia ===
The Estonian government issues all citizens with a smart card and digital identity called the Estonian ID card. Additionally, Sertifitseerimiskeskus, the certificate authority of Estonia issues special SIM cards to mobile phones which act as national personal identification method. The service is called m-id.

=== Turkey ===
In 2007, the mobile operator Turkcell bought a mobile signature service infrastructure Gemalto and launched Mobillmza, the world's first mobile security solution. They have partnered up with over 200 businesses, including many banks to enable them to use mobile signatures for online user authentication.

Other services relying on mobile signatures in Turkey include securing the withdrawal of small loans from an ATM, and processing custom work flow processes by enabling applicants to use mobile signatures.

=== Austria ===
The Austrian government allows private sector companies to propose means for storing the government-controlled digital identity. Since 2006, the Austrian government has explicitly mentioned mobile phones as one of the likely devices to be used for storing and managing a digital identity. Eight Austrian saving banks will launch a pilot allowing online user authentication with mobile signatures.

=== Ukraine ===
In Ukraine, Mobile ID project started in 2015, and later declared as one of Government of Ukraine priorities supported by EU. At the beginning of 2018 Ukrainian cell operators are evaluating proposals and testing platforms from different local and foreign developers. Platform selection will be followed up by comprehensive certification process.

Ukrainian IT and cryptography around Mobile ID topic is mostly presented by Innovation Development HUB LLC with its own Mobile ID platform. This particular solution is the sole, having already passed the certification, and most likely will be implemented in Ukraine.

As of September 2019, all of 'big three' cell operators in Ukraine have launched Mobile ID service.

Vodafone - commercial launch in August 2018.

Kyivstar - commercial launch in December 2018.

Lifecell - commercial launch in August 2019.

Vodafone and Lifecell operators implemented Mobile ID solution of Ukrainian origin designed by Innovation Development HUB LLC.

== See also ==
- Identity management
- Location-based service
- Mobile computing
- Mobile security
