= Web callback =

Telephone service involving internet forms for customer service

A typical Web callback form

Web callback is a technology where a person can enter his or her telephone number in a form on a web site. The company who owns that Web site will then receive the Web callback request and a call center agent will call the person who made the request back on the number they entered.

In some implementations, the Web callback service provider will place outgoing calls to the owner of the web site, and the user, then connect the calls together. An alternative approach is for the web site owner to receive a SMS text message, so they can initiate the call to the web site user.

Some Web callback service providers allow the callback form to be embedded into the web site, sometimes matching the look and feel of the existing site. Others simply add a hyperlink to the site, which is linked to the service providers own site.

== Web Callback vs Click To Call ==
Different than a simple computer Click To Call (CTC), Web Callbacks are not calls generated from the users computer, but will call any number entered.

=== Trends ===
As more advanced Web Callback technology is becoming more available, businesses are finding it a useful tool to increase inbound marketing. Along with normal businesses that you would expect to use the tech, that want more calls from their website, the Pay Per Call Industry or Pay Per Call Arbitrage is now seeing an increase use of Web Callback technology to deliver more calls to their clients.
