= Flybe (1979–2020) =

Regional airline of the United Kingdom

British European Airways/flybe

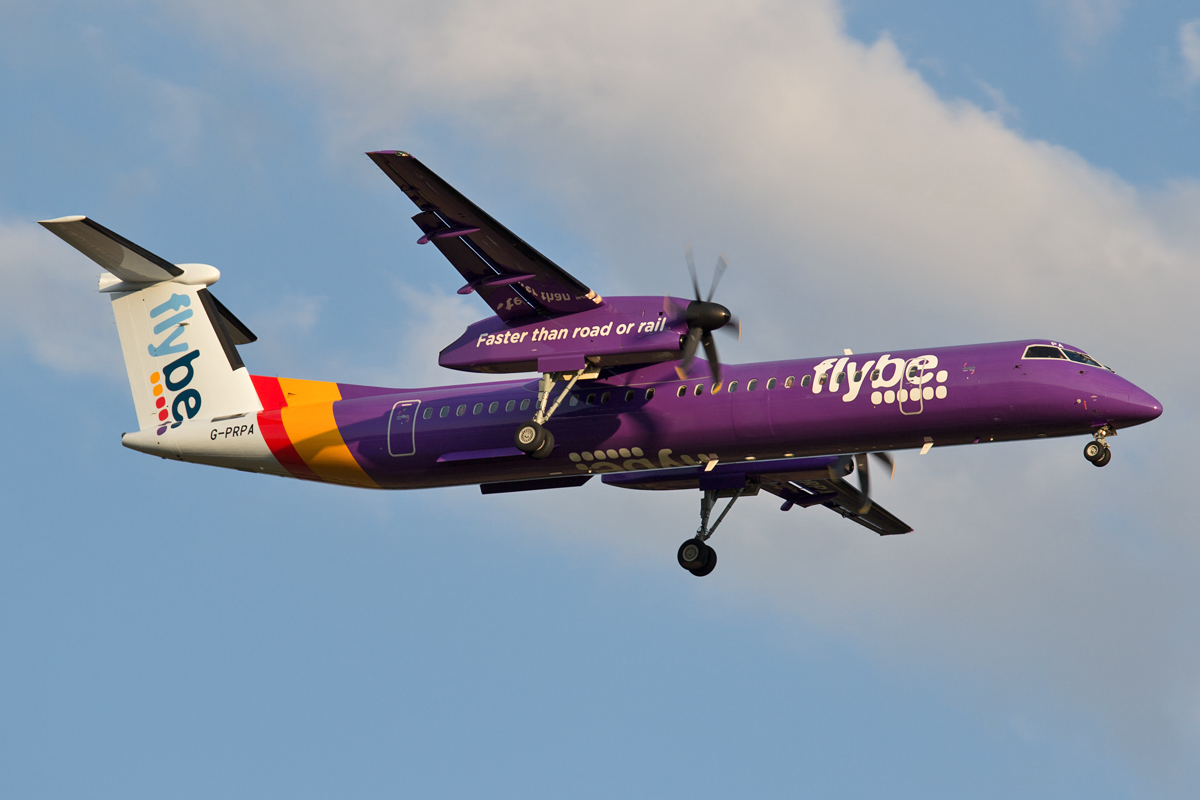
- De Havilland Dash 8 Q400
IATA	ICAO	Call sign
BE	BEE	JERSEY
- Founded: 1 November 1979 (as Jersey European Airways)
- Ceased operations: 5 March 2020
- AOC #: 601
- Hubs: Birmingham; Manchester; Exeter
- Focus cities: Aberdeen; Belfast–City; Edinburgh; Glasgow; Newquay; Inverness; Isle of Man; Jersey; Southampton
- Frequent-flyer program: formerly Avios
- Fleet size: 63
- Destinations: 56
- Parent company: Connect Airways
- Employees: 1,931
- Website: flybe.com

Flybe (pronounced /ˈflaɪˌbiː/), styled as flybe, was a British airline based in Exeter, England. Launched in 1979 as Jersey European Airways, and rebranded flybe in 2002, at various points it was the largest independent regional airline in Europe, and provided more than half of the UK domestic flights outside of London.

Jersey European Airways (UK) Ltd. (JEA) was formed on 1 November 1979 after the merger of both Intra Airways and Express Air Services passenger scheduled operations. In 1983, JEA was sold to Walkersteel, which also owned Spacegrand Aviation; the two airlines were merged under the Jersey European name during 1985. The airline experienced significant growth during the 1990s. It was renamed British European Airways Ltd. on 1 June 2000 and rebranded flybe in 2002. On 3 November 2006, it was announced that Flybe was in the process of purchasing BA Connect. With the sale (assets and operations on 5 Mar 2007, operations on 25 Mar 2007), the airline became the largest regional airline in Europe. On 10 December 2010, the company was floated in an initial public offering on the London Stock Exchange.

In February 2019, the airline was sold to the Connect Airways consortium, backed by Virgin Atlantic and Stobart Aviation. Connect Airways intended Flybe and Stobart Air to then rebrand as Virgin Connect, although they would have retained their own air operator certificates. On 5 March 2020, British European filed for administration and ceased operations. The airline, which had been struggling for several months, claimed that its difficulties were compounded by the impact of the COVID-19 pandemic on bookings.

In October 2020, Thyme Opco, a company linked to former shareholder Cyrus Capital, agreed with the administrators to purchase the flybe brand and relaunch the airline in 2021, subject to regulatory approvals. In April 2021, a new company named Flybe Limited, obtained an operating licence, route licences, and airport slots; the first flight took place on 13 April 2022. The relaunched airline ceased trading on 28 January 2023.

== History ==
=== Early years ===
One of Jersey European's former logos, used from 1991 to 2000

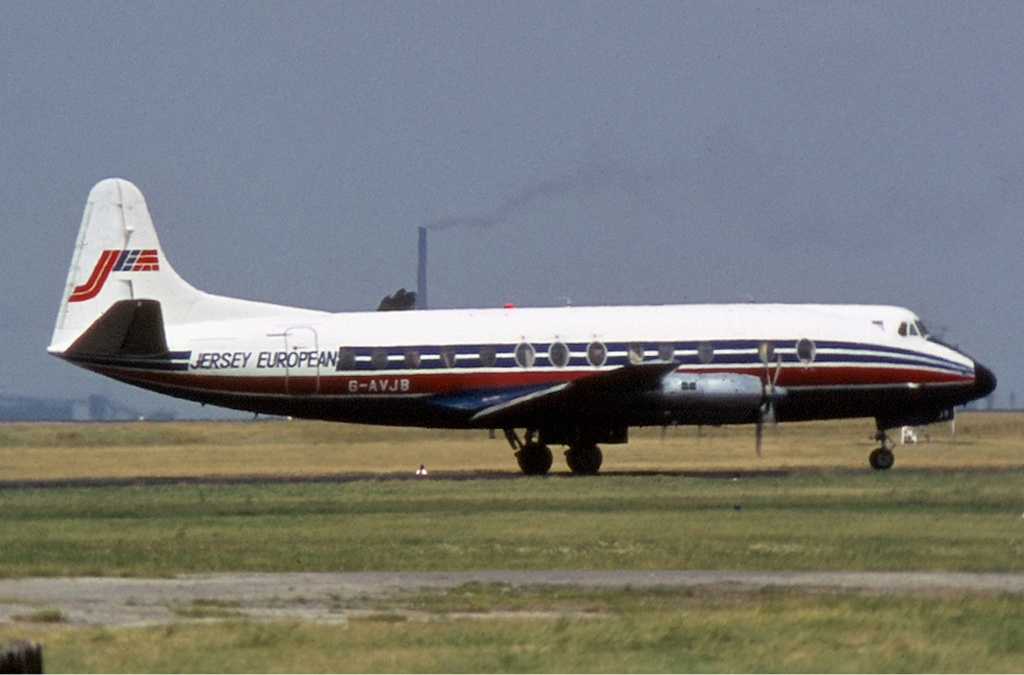
A Jersey European Vickers Viscount at Düsseldorf Airport in June 1980

The airline started operations on 1 November 1979 as Jersey European Airways Ltd. as a result of a merger of the Intra Airways (from Jersey) and Express Air Services (based in Bournemouth) passenger scheduled operations. It was founded by John Habin, a resident of Jersey and the majority investor. After selling Aviation Beauport and other business interests, Habin invested in the firm so that it could establish several routes from Jersey Airport to major airports in the UK. At the beginning it was an Air Bridge Carriers subsidiary. On 1 July 1980 it merged the operations of Haywards Aviation Ltd. Initially equipped with an aging fleet of war-surplus Douglas DC-3 aircraft, Jersey European Airways gradually bought with more modern regional airliners.

In November 1983, Habin sold his stake in Jersey European Airways to Jack Walker's Walker Steel Group, which already owned Spacegrand Aviation Services Ltd. based in Blackpool. Initially, the two airlines were run separately although they partially shared management; Exeter Airport served as a critical hub, forming a meeting point between the two companies' route networks. On 26 October 1985, both airlines were amalgamated under the Jersey European name; the combined entity's headquarters was established in Exeter. From 1984 the airline operated with British Caledonian Commuter brand on some routes. In 1985, Jersey European Airways carried 160,000 passengers and achieved an annual revenue of just under £9 million.

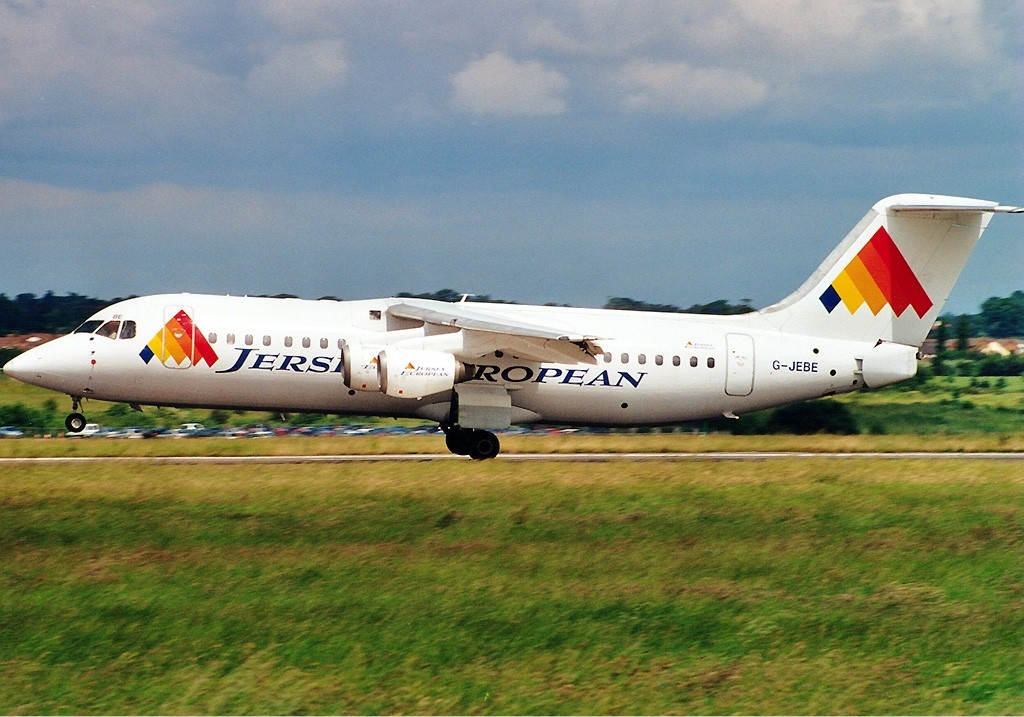
A Jersey European BAe 146 wearing the 1991–2000 livery

During 1990, Jersey European Airways' passenger count rose to 460,000, being 40 percent greater than the previous year. During 1991, the airline commenced its first route to London, flying between Guernsey and London Gatwick. In 1993, it received the first of its British Aerospace 146 aircraft, a four-engined jet-powered regional aircraft. That same year, the airline introduced a business class service aboard some aircraft. Around that time, the Exeter hub was supplemented by connections in both London and Birmingham. By 1995, Jersey European Airways was again expanding after incurring minor losses during the prior year.

In mid-1997, Jersey European Airways announced that it had achieved record results in its previous financial year amid a boom in Europe's regional airlines market; in the same year, the firm secured a franchise arrangement with Air France covering routes from London Heathrow to Toulouse and Lyon, expanded its fleet to provide 32% more seat capacity, and recorded a 27% increase in sales while profits had risen by nearly a third to reach £3.4 million. That same year, the airline, which operated a mixed fleet of 12 British Aerospace 146s, four Fokker F27s and two Short 360s was in the process of leasing additional BAe 146s to cater for expansion. Jim French, Jersey European's deputy chief executive, announced that the company was performing detailed studies with the aim of introducing larger airliners in the 150- to 170-seat class, such as the Boeing 737 and Airbus A320 families.

=== 2000–2010 ===
Flybe's first logo after rebranding

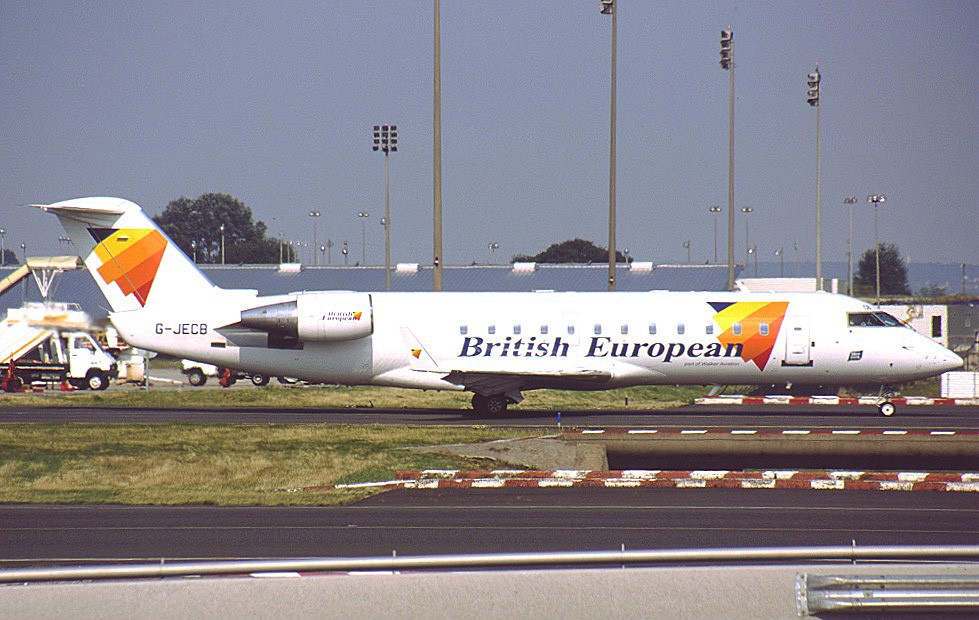
A British European Bombardier CRJ200 wearing the 2000–2002 livery

In June 2000, the airline announced that it had been renamed British European Airways Ltd.; according to a company spokesperson, that was due to the Jersey European Airways name no longer being an accurate reflection of the scope of the routes which were covered. The name was soon shortened to simply Flybe on 18 July 2002 and the airline repositioned itself as a full-service, low-fare airline. Various pricing and product changes were made in line with this position such as discounted one-way tickets, the abolition of overbooking practices, a customer charter of the airline's service standards, as well as compensation for delays.

In June 2005, it was announced that Flybe would procure a fleet of 26 Embraer E-195 regional airliners; it would claim that it had opted for the 118-seat E-195 over rival 150-seat aircraft due to economics and performance benefits. Flybe would serve as the launch customer for the E-195, receiving the first example of the type during the later half of 2006. Initially, the E-195 fleet were assigned to the airline's high-volume trunk routes, but the firm later planned to use it on new routes to expand their network. Further E-195s would be ordered by the airline over the following decade, the type making up a major proportion of Flybe's fleet.

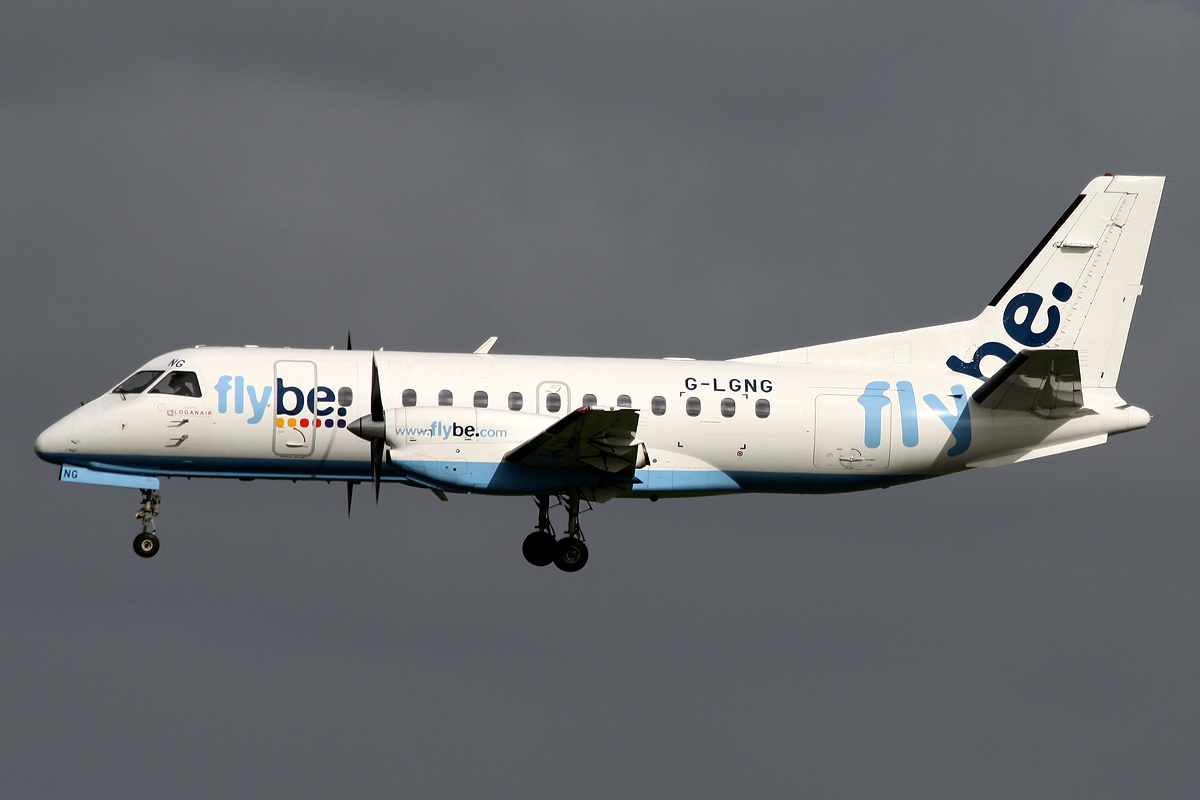
Loganair Saab 340B in Flybe colours

On 3 November 2006, it was announced that Flybe would buy BA Connect, except for that airline's services out of London City Airport. During March 2007, this takeover was completed; as a consequence of the BA Connect takeover, the ownership of Flybe was divided between Rosedale Aviation Holdings (69%), Flybe staff (16%) and the International Airlines Group (15%). The acquisition increased Flybe's route network in both the UK and continental Europe, making Flybe Europe's largest regional airline. On 14 January 2008, it was announced that Flybe had signed a franchise agreement with Scottish airline Loganair, to commence on 26 October 2008 following the termination of Loganair's franchise agreement with British Airways on 25 October 2008. The agreement would see Loganair aircraft flying in Flybe colours on 55 routes from Scotland. In 2008, in order to avoid losing a £280,000 rebate from Norwich Airport, Flybe advertised for "actors", as well as offering free return flights to Dublin on its website. As a result, the environmental group Friends of the Earth called on the government to launch an investigation into the aviation industry.

Chief Executive Officer Jim French was recognised in the 2009 Queen's Birthday Honours List with a CBE for his services to the airline industry. On 10 December 2010, Flybe floated in an IPO on the London Stock Exchange, with trading in shares commencing on the same day. Full public release of shares followed on 15 December 2010. The share price was set at 295p, valuing the company at approximately £215 million, and raising £66 million for the company, half of which was to pay for fleet expansion.

=== 2011–2020 ===
On 23 May 2013, it was reported that Flybe had sold its slots at Gatwick Airport to EasyJet for £20 million, and that the slots would be handed over to EasyJet on 29 March 2014. CEO and chairman Jim French retired in August 2013, leaving the post of CEO to Saad Hammad, formerly of EasyJet, while Simon Laffin became chairman. By November 2013, Hammad had shaken up the operation, requesting the resignations of three top managers within six weeks of his arrival. Out of 158 routes flown at the time, over 60 did not cover their direct operating expenses and the costs of crew and aircraft.

On 23 April 2014, Flybe announced that it would launch domestic and international flights from London City Airport from 27 October 2014 after signing a five-year deal with the airport. The airline was expecting to carry around 500,000 passengers a year, with all five allocated aircraft being based around the Flybe network overnight. In March 2014, it was announced that Flybe would undergo a major brand refresh. This new scheme included a new purple aircraft livery, new interior features and new uniforms. During June 2014, British Airways sold most of its remaining stake in the airline; it had already been reduced to 5% by share issues.

In early 2016, it was announced that Flybe had negotiated a six-year agreement with SAS Scandinavian Airlines to fly 4 ATR 72–9 aircraft on their behalf, starting in October 2016. On 4 March 2015, Flybe announced new routes from Cardiff Airport bringing the number of routes to eleven. Flybe also stated their intention to create a new base at Cardiff Airport in summer 2015, initially basing two Embraer 195 aircraft there, which subsequently increased to three. On 10 November 2015, Flybe announced that it would base two Embraer 195 aircraft at Doncaster Sheffield Airport in South Yorkshire, starting new routes to Amsterdam, Berlin Tegel, Paris Charles de Gaulle (Paris CDG), Jersey, Alicante Airport, Málaga, Faro, Portugal and Newquay as of 27 March 2016. The announcement came on the same day that Flybe announced they would be pulling flights from Bournemouth Airport in England. Dublin Airport was added in October 2016, taking over where Stobart Air left. On 26 October 2016, it was announced that Hammad would be standing down as CEO with immediate effect and consequently, Flybe was beginning the process of finding a replacement. On 21 November 2016, Flybe announced it would open its first European base at Düsseldorf Airport in Germany. In February 2017 that commenced with two aircraft alongside 60 pilots, cabin crew and engineers. On 22 December 2016, Flybe started selling flights for 12 further destinations from Southend Airport in London in an extension to their existing franchise operation with Stobart Air.

Flybe and Loganair separately announced that their franchise agreement would terminate in October 2017. Flybe then announced a partnership with Eastern Airways, a British airline and would now operate routes in direct competition with Loganair–namely flights from the Scottish mainland to Stornoway in the Isle of Lewis, Kirkwall in Orkney, Scotland and Sumburgh in Shetland, Scotland. On 16 January 2017, former CityJet boss Christine Ourmieres-Widener, took over as CEO after Saad Hammad left in October 2016. Later in the year, Flybe began flying from Heathrow to Aberdeen Airport and Edinburgh taking over slots previously used by Virgin Atlantic Little Red.

On 22 February 2018, franchise partner Stobart Air confirmed interest in a takeover bid of 100% of Flybe for an undisclosed fee. However that bid was rejected by the carrier and Stobart scrapped its interest on 22 March 2018, causing share prices in the airline, which had climbed by up to 25% following the bid, to drop back to their previous level. In September 2018, a revised aircraft livery was launched, with purple and white being retained but lilac replacing the red and yellow. On 14 November 2018, after the airline's shares fell by 75%, Flybe announced that it was talking with various parties about a potential sale of the business, as part of a wide-ranging review of strategic options. On 22 November, news emerged that Virgin Atlantic was one of the parties with which Flybe had been holding discussions; Flybe's slots at Heathrow were of particular interest to Virgin Atlantic, along with the potential to use Flybe to feed passengers into the Virgin Atlantic hubs in Manchester and London Heathrow.

==== Connect Airways takeover ====
On 11 January 2019, a takeover bid worth £2.2 million by the Connect Airways consortium, which includes Virgin Atlantic and Stobart Aviation, was confirmed. The consortium planned to lend £20 million enabling Flybe to continue operations and would take over Stobart Air; when the acquisition is completed it would provide a further £80 million. The initial deal, which would have been conditional on shareholder and court approval, was expected to be completed by the second quarter of 2019. Flybe and Stobart Air would operate under the Virgin Atlantic brand though they would retain their own air operator certificates. Optimisation of Flybe's routes would likely result in a "limited reduction" in its fleet.

On 15 January 2019, Connect Airways increased its offer by £600,000, and set out improved bridging loan conditions, with £10 million to be released immediately to support Flybe's business and a further £10 million available. Subsequent funding of £80 million was also confirmed. In accepting the revised offer, Flybe's board said that it provided the security which the business needed and preserved the interests of its stakeholders, customers, employees, partners, and pension members. The deal which covered Flybe Group's operating subsidiaries, i.e. the airline and the website, would be completed by 22 February 2019.

Flybe Group's shareholders had decided in December 2018 to transfer its final shares to a standard listing, meaning that shareholder approval for the sale of the assets was no longer required. Notwithstanding the change, on 21 January 2019 one of the largest shareholders, Hosking Partners, threatened legal action to block the deal which it believed undervalued the company. On 4 February 2019, Flybe confirmed that it had received a valid request from Hosking Partners to convene a general meeting in order to appoint a new director, but noted that Flybe's articles of association did not give members the powers needed for the new director's proposed investigation of the sale. It confirmed that it had received and rejected, a preliminary alternative bid from former Stobart CEO Andrew Tinkler. On 7 February, Flybe Group warned its shareholders that after the sale of the operating assets, the parent company would be wound up if they did not approve its sale. On 20 February, Flybe said it had rejected an alternative "preliminary and highly conditional contingency proposal" from Mesa Air Group in Phoenix and supported by Tinkler, noting that it could not be executed quickly enough to enable the airline to continue trading.

On 21 February 2019, Flybe announced that the sale of Flybe Limited and Flybe.com Limited to Connect Airways had been completed, with Flybe flights continuing to operate as normal. The sale of the parent company, Flybe Group plc, now an empty shell, was confirmed by its shareholders at a meeting on 4 March and became effective on 11 March. In October 2019, it was announced that Flybe would be rebranded as Virgin Connect, reflecting its incorporation into the Virgin Group, with effect from early 2020. The Virgin Group launched a landing page virginconnect.com to avoid confusion with the existing Virgin Connect brand used in Russia for internet & mobile services.

In January 2020, it emerged that Flybe was again in difficulties, incurring mounting losses despite the financing provided by Connect Airways. A deal was reached on 15 January, entailing a deferred payment plan for Flybe's tax debts and increased funding from Connect Airways. The UK government also agreed to conduct an urgent review of Air Passenger Duty on domestic flights. By January 2020, Flybe operated 36% of all UK domestic flights (ahead of the UK's two largest airlines, British Airways and EasyJet), carrying 26% of domestic passengers (behind British Airways and EasyJet which operate larger types of aircraft). In February 2020, the UK government envisaged granting Flybe a £100 million rescue loan, and held talks with the EU Commission to ensure that state aid rules were not broken. In early March, the airline faced concern over the impact of the COVID-19 pandemic on bookings, casting doubt on whether the loan would be granted.

==== End of operations ====
In the early morning of 5 March 2020, the airline filed for administration and ceased all operations with immediate effect after the UK government failed to grant a proposed £100 million ($129 million) loan. Virgin Atlantic said that Connect Airways could "no longer commit to continued financial support" despite its investment of over £135 million; Virgin Atlantic placed part of the blame on the negative impact of the COVID-19 pandemic on Flybe's trading. All flights operated by Flybe and Stobart Air were cancelled, although those operated by franchisees Blue Islands, an airline in the Channel Islands and Eastern Airways continued. The chief executive, Mark Anderson, said that Flybe had made "every possible attempt" to prevent the collapse but were "unable to overcome significant funding challenges".

As of 1 May 2020, Flybe's administrators EY believed that a sale of the business as a going concern remained possible, having received around 20 non-binding offers including three for the entire business and assets, and expected to receive final offers for evaluation in early May. They appealed to the UK transport secretary to ensure that Flybe's operating licence is not revoked, as this would prevent the sale of the valuable airport slots. The appeal was successful, and on 9 July the CAA withdrew its revocation decision. Further legal action remained, relating to Flybe's slots at Heathrow – which have been taken over by British Airways parent IAG – and to its air operator certificate.

=== Relaunch ===
On 19 October 2020, reports emerged that Lucien Farrell, in charge of former shareholder Cyrus Capital's London office, had formed a new company, Thyme Opco, to purchase the Flybe brand and relaunch the airline, subject to regulatory approvals. The new owner planned to "start small and restore regional connectivity in the UK" from 2021. On 1 December 2020, Thyme Opco applied for a UK operating licence. Thyme Opco also registered a 21-year-old Q400, which was expected to be the first aircraft for the 'new Flybe'; since then the jet was acquired by PAL Airlines, a regional airline in Eastern Canada. In April 2021, the British CAA granted the new airline an operating licence as well as Type A and B route licences, enabling the carrier to operate both charter and scheduled services. The new company also obtained 86 slots at Heathrow for the summer 2021 season, to be used for flights to Edinburgh and Aberdeen, but the airline was not relaunched in time to use these slots.

The 'original' Flybe company was renamed FBE Realisations 2021 Limited, with Thyme Opco Limited becoming Flybe Limited. On 3 June 2021, the operating licence for the original company was revoked following an unsuccessful appeal to the Transport Secretary. Despite initial beliefs that its legacy slots at UK airports had returned to the slot coordinator, that was shown not to be the case by coordinator ACL. The new operating company also leased Heathrow slots from British Airways for routes to Edinburgh and Aberdeen.

On 26 October 2021, the new Flybe Limited confirmed that it had appointed David Pflieger as its chief executive. That closely followed the appearance of an ex-Flybe Q400, registered as G-JECX, which had been painted with a new purple-and-white livery. In November 2021, the airline announced that it had picked Birmingham Airport as its new base, with operations scheduled to begin in early 2022 to "key regions across the UK and EU". On 16 March 2022, Flybe announced that it would start ticket sales the following week, and that Belfast would be the airline's second operating base. The company slogan was "Smile and go the extra mile." On 22 March the company's website opened for bookings; the first flight took place on 13 April 2022.

On 28 January 2023, Flybe entered administration and ceased all operations. On 18 March 2024, administration of the original Flybe (FBE Realisations 2021 Limited) ceased and the company was dissolved.

== Corporate affairs ==
=== Ownership and structure ===
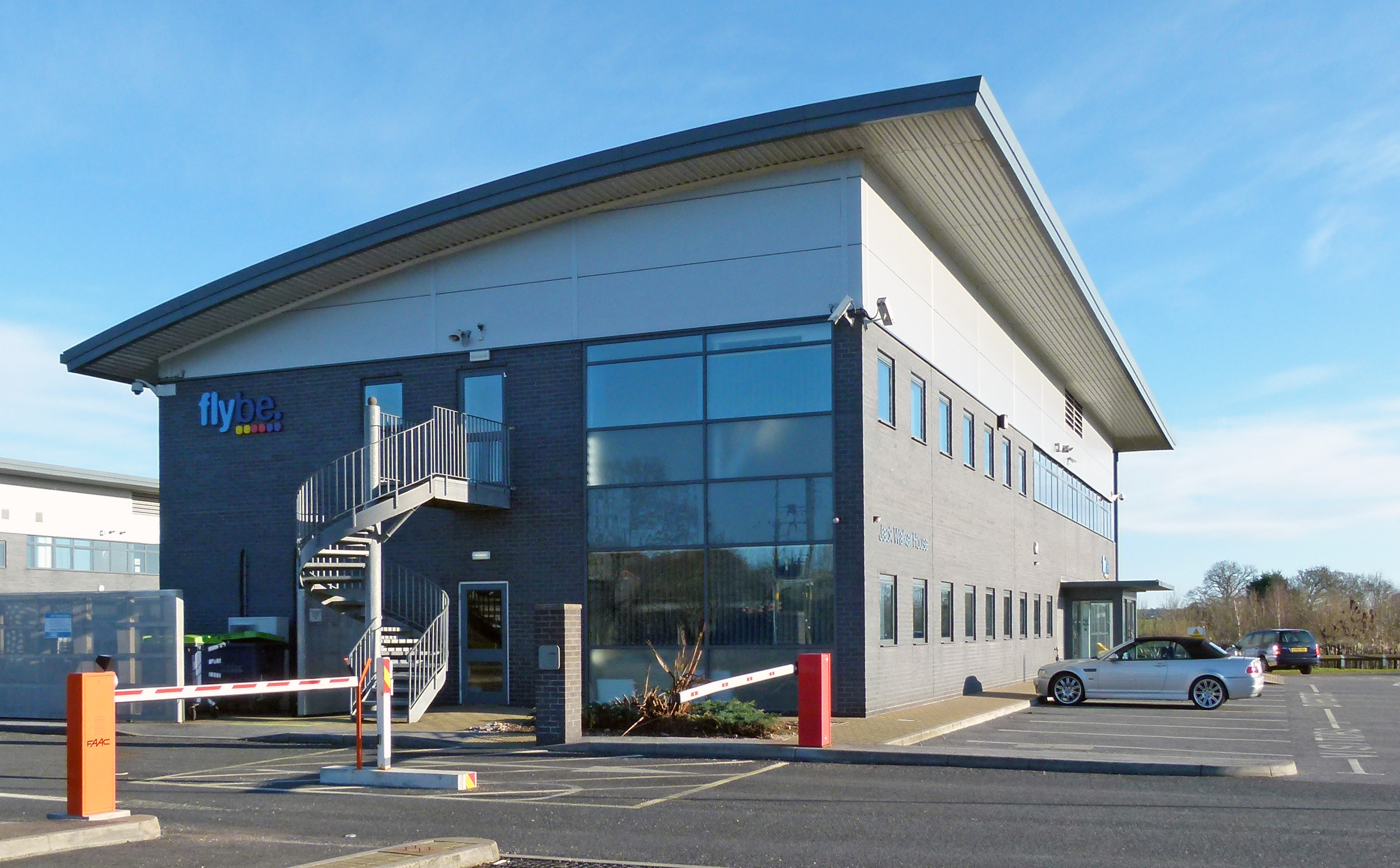
Jack Walker House, Flybe's former head office (located at Exeter Airport in Exeter)

The former owner, Flybe Group plc, was a public company listed on the London Stock Exchange (LSE: FLYB). Until November 2013, the main shareholder, with 48.1% of the shares, was Rosedale Aviation Holdings Limited, the corporate representative of the trustee of the Jack Walker 1987 Settlement, which was established by the late Jack Walker, who was involved in Flybe's early development.

In the UK, Flybe's largest base was at Birmingham Airport; the airline had other large bases at Belfast City, Manchester and Southampton airports, with a total of 14 crew and aircraft who were based across the United Kingdom, the Channel Islands and the Isle of Man. The airline held a Civil Aviation Authority Type A Operating Licence permitting it to carry passengers, cargo and mail on aircraft with 20 or more seats. The Flybe Group included Flybe Aviation Services (engineering and maintenance), Flybe Training Academy (engineering and flight crew training), Flybe UK (airline operations) and Flybe Europe, the holding company for all European operations, which previously consisted of Flybe Nordic.

=== Business trends ===
Trends for Flybe Group during the period 2007–2018 are shown below (as at year ending 31 March):

	2007	2008	2009	2010	2011	2012	2013	2014	2015	2016	2017	2018
Group turnover (total, less JV) (£M)	367.5	535.9	572.4	570.5	595.5	615.3	614.3	620.5	574.1	623.8	707.4	752.6
Profit before tax (EBITDA) (£M)	−16.2	30.4	0.1	5.7	7.6	−7.1	−23.2	8.1	−35.6	2.7	−48.5	−9.4
Profit after tax (£M)	−19.9	34.9	4.1	6.7	3.8	−6.4	−41.8	8.0	−35.7	6.8	−26.7	—N/a
Number of employees (average/*year end)	1,931	3,197	2,860	2,798	2,949	2,781	2,667	2,650	2,069*	2,262*	2,388*	2,346*
Number of passengers (scheduled) (m)	5.2	7.0	7.3	7.2	7.2	7.6	7.2	7.7	7.7	8.2	8.8	9.5
Passenger load factor (schedule) (%)	—N/a	—N/a	65.4	63.5	61.7	61.9	62.6	69.5	75.2	72.6	69.6	75.6
Number of aircraft (average/*year end)	81*	80*	68	67	68	84	81	97	66*	74*	83*	80*
Notes/sources												

=== Joint ventures and franchises ===
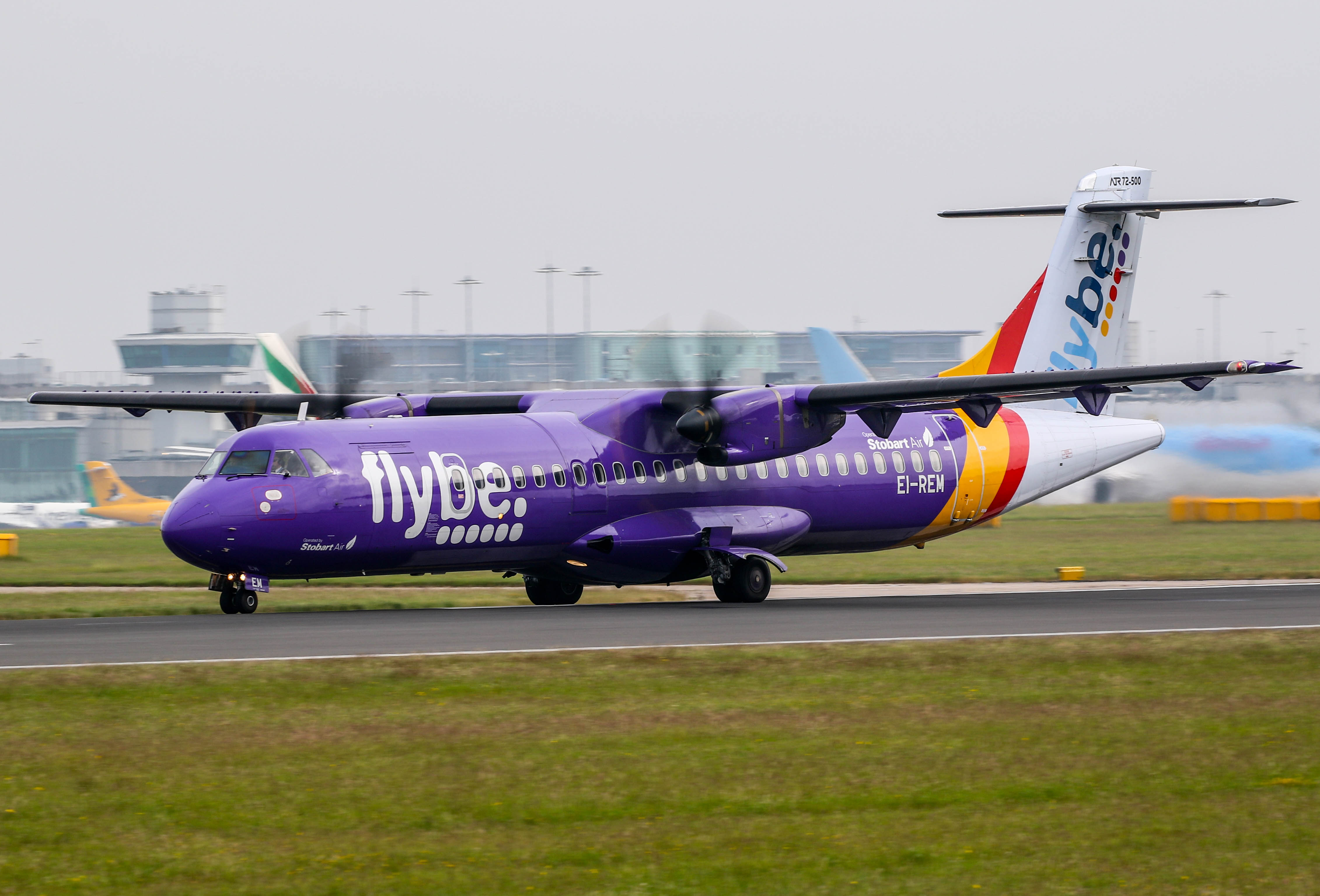
Flybe ATR 72-500 (operated by Stobart Air), 2016

Loganair, a Scottish airline, was the first franchise partner for Flybe and operated a number of flights in Scotland and Ireland under a franchise agreement from 2008. Loganair aircraft wore the full Flybe livery during the time of the franchise. In 2016, it was announced that the agreement was to end on 31 August 2017 at which time Loganair would become an independent carrier.

In 2014, Flybe signed their second franchise agreement with Stobart Air, and initially started operating European routes from Southend Airport. In 2015, Stobart Air began operating more flights on behalf of Flybe from Ronaldsway Airport, Isle of Man using two ATR 72. In 2017, Flybe and Stobart Air began operating additional services from Southend Airport using Flybe Embraer 195 jet aircraft.

On 11 January 2016, Flybe announced its third franchise deal with the Jersey based airline, Blue Islands. Now all Blue Islands flights operated under the Flybe name, and the Blue Islands aircraft livery was replaced with the current Flybe livery from May 2016. However the deal was under investigation and was reported to potentially break local competition laws.

From 1 September 2017, Eastern Airways became a new franchise partner for Flybe taking over routes previously operated by Loganair from Aberdeen Airport, Glasgow Airport and Edinburgh Airport. That meant both Flybe and Loganair were now in direct competition with each other. In January 2018, services to Sumburgh were being withdrawn, owing to the competition with Loganair and the route being unable to sustain two carriers. It was announced that Loganair was withdrawing services from Glasgow to Manchester leaving Flybe as the sole operator on that route.

Flybe purchased Finncomm Airlines with Finnair of Finland in July 2011, and on 30 October 2011 rebranded the airline as Flybe Nordic. The joint venture operated its own routes along with franchise routes under a codeshare agreement for Finnair, operating under Flybe's BE-code. Flybe agreed to sell its 60% stake in Flybe Nordic in November 2014 for €1, in an attempt to reduce group costs. On 1 May 2015, Flybe Nordic began operating solely for Finnair as it was no longer a part of Flybe. Flybe Nordic is now known as Nordic Regional Airlines – Norra.

=== Sponsorship ===
Flybe was the main sponsor of Exeter City Football Club and also sponsored the Exeter Chiefs with their branding featured on both teams' shirts. Flybe had also sponsored the ITV Weather forecasts on ITV Channel Television, ITV Cymru Wales, ITV Meridian, ITV West Country, STV, UTV, and the sport sections of the Manchester Evening News, the Express & Echo (Exeter), the South Wales Echo (Cardiff), the Isle of Man Courier and the Isle of Man Examiner.

Flybe had previously sponsored Birmingham City (2003–2007), Norwich City (2006–2008), Southampton (2006–2010), and Inverness Caledonian Thistle (2007–2010).

=== Services ===
==== Frequent-flyer programmes ====
Flybe used the Avios frequent-flyer program until 30 April 2019, when Flybe and Avios ended their partnership and all accounts were closed. The programme is operated by the IAG subsidiary Avios Group.

==== Cabin and service ====
Flybe's cabin interiors were configured with a single-class all-economy layout. It operated an allocated seating policy on its flights. Passengers had the option to choose a specific seat of their choice online in advance for a fee or have one allocated free of charge during online check-in or at the airport check-in. The airline operated a buy on board programme, called "Café Flybe", offering food and drinks for purchase. On most flights to and from the Channel Islands a selection of duty free spirits and tobacco items was also available for purchase.

Passengers had the option of three ticket types, "Just Fly", "Get More" and "All In".

- "Just Fly" was the most basic ticket type, with just the flight included and extra options available to add for an additional fee.
- "Get More" ticket holders were able to reserve a seat and take a 23 kg hold bag.
- "All In" ticket holders received a complimentary drink and snack, access to Flybe Executive Lounges, free pre-booked seating, priority check-in, and two hold bags.

== Destinations ==
Flybe provided short haul services to destinations throughout the United Kingdom, Ireland, and continental Europe.

=== Former partnerships and codeshare agreements ===
Flybe formerly had codeshares with the following airlines under the 'One Stop to the World' programme:

- Aer Lingus
- Air France
- Air India
- Alitalia
- British Airways
- Cathay Pacific
- Emirates
- Etihad Airways
- Finnair
- Loganair
- Singapore Airlines
- United Airlines
- Virgin Atlantic

The airline also had franchise agreements with the following airlines:

- Blue Islands
- Eastern Airways
- Loganair (agreement ended 2017)
- Stobart Air

=== Interline agreement ===
Flybe had an interline agreement with Pakistan International Airlines

== Fleet ==
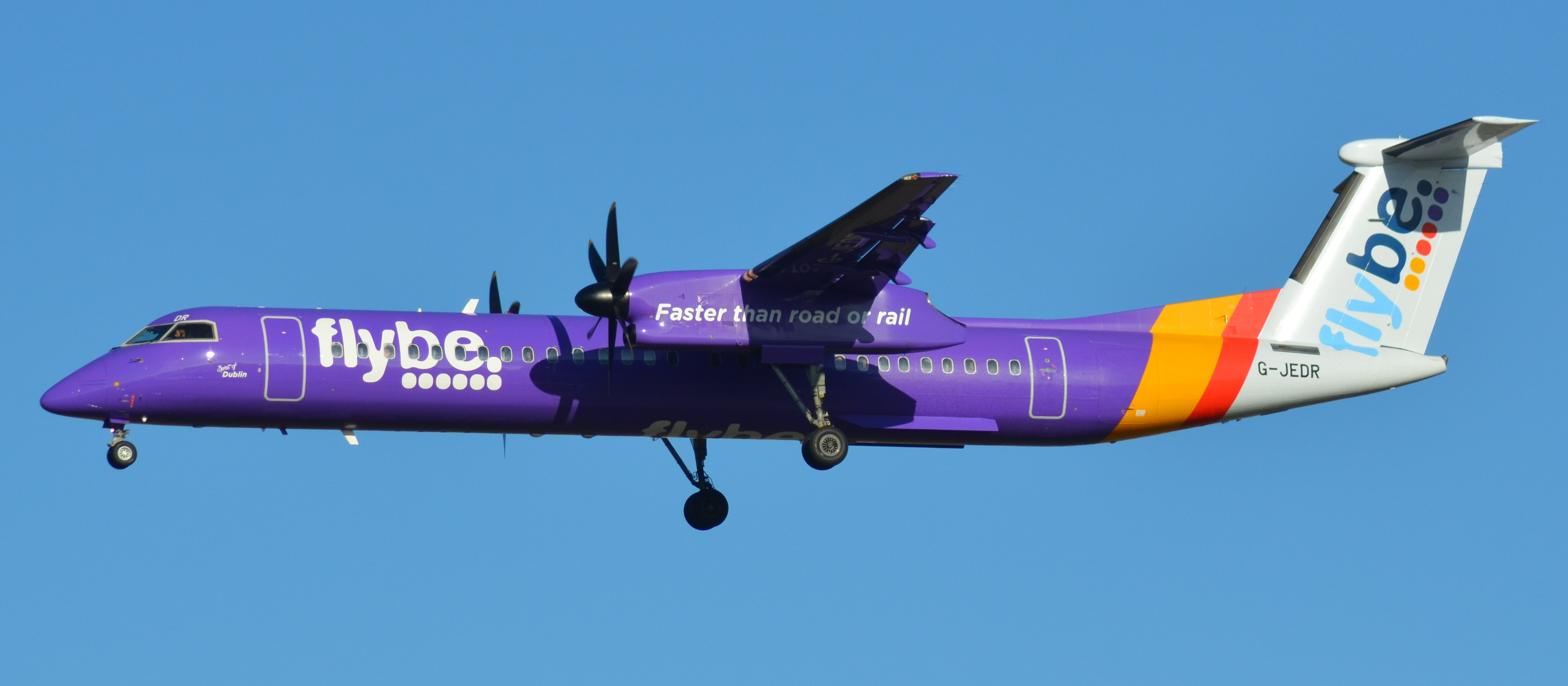
Flybe DHC-8-400, 2015

Before ceasing operations, these were the aircraft in the Flybe fleet:

Flybe fleet
Aircraft	In service	Orders	Passengers	Notes
de Havilland Canada Dash 8 Q400	54	—	78	
Embraer 175	9	—	88	
Total	63	—		

=== Fleet strategy and developments ===
Flybe retired its final Embraer 195 in February 2020, which was returned to lessors once it was retired. It had said that the Q400 would be the backbone of its fleet going forward.

==== Dash 8 Q400 ====
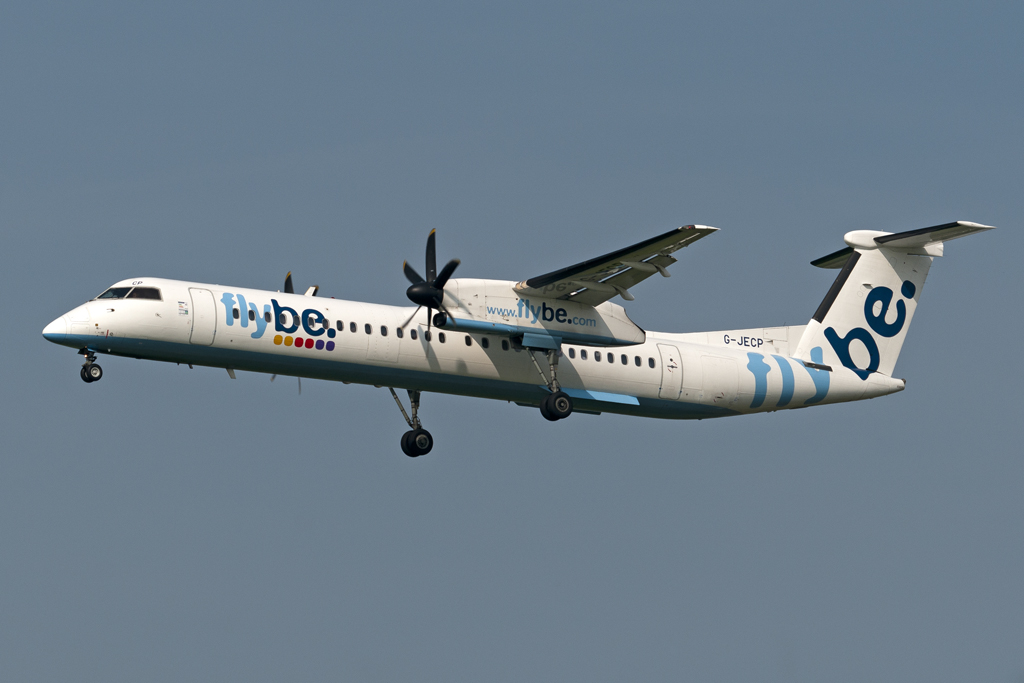
Flybe DHC-8-400 wearing the 2002 livery

Flybe became the world's largest operator of the Dash 8 Q400 after it added 24 planes leased from Republic Airways, a US regional airline, in 2014. In May 2007, the airline signed a deal with Bombardier, an aircraft manufacturer in Montreal, Canada for a further 15 Q400 aircraft valued at US$394 million (£197 million), with options for a further 15, increasing its fleet of the type to 60. In September 2014, Republic Airways agreed to lease 24 of their Q400 aircraft to Flybe with delivery over two years starting from March 2018. In June 2017, Flybe announced that due to a loss of near to £20 million, it would retire six Q400 aircraft in 2017.

When Flybe collapsed in March 2020 its 54 Dash 8 Q400s were placed into storage. In January 2021, aerial firefighting airline specialist Conair Group in Abbotsford, British Columbia in Canada announced that it had purchased 11 of Flybe's Q400 for conversion into water bombers and multi-role firefighting aircraft.

==== Embraer 175 ====
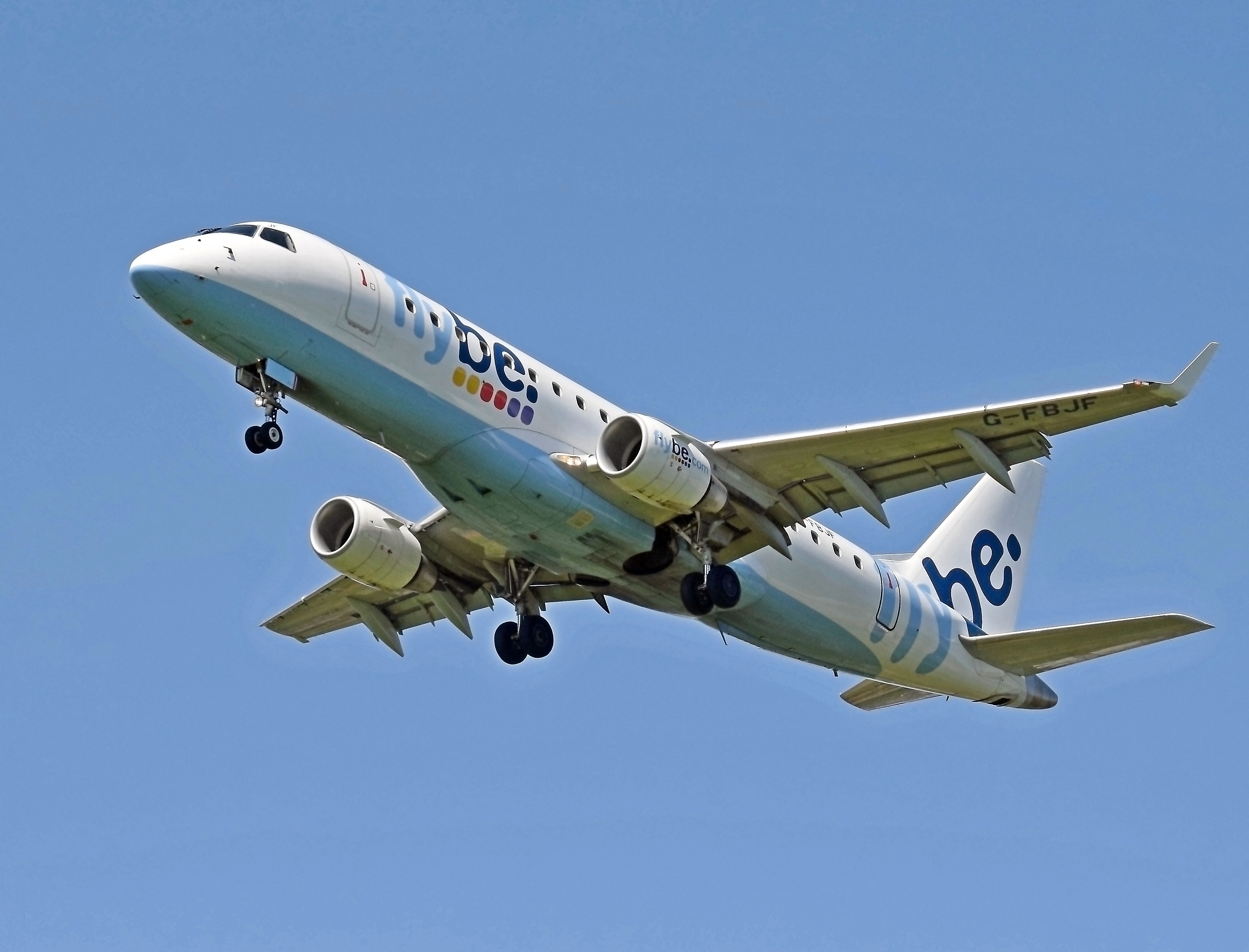
Flybe Embraer 175 painted in the 2002 livery

On 20 July 2010, Flybe placed an order for 35 Embraer 175 aircraft worth US$1.3 billion (£850 million), with options for 65 more (value $2.3 billion/£1.5 billion) and purchase rights for a further 40 (value $1.4 billion/£0.9 billion). The 88-seat aircraft was originally planned to be delivered between July 2011 and March 2017; with the first two aircraft arriving in November 2011.

In 2020 Flybe's nine E175s were transferred to various lessors when they collapsed. Six of the new aircraft which had been acquired went to a company in Bermuda called Flybe Leasing, with one, G-FBJK, going to Republic Airways, and is currently used for spare parts.

==== Embraer 195 ====
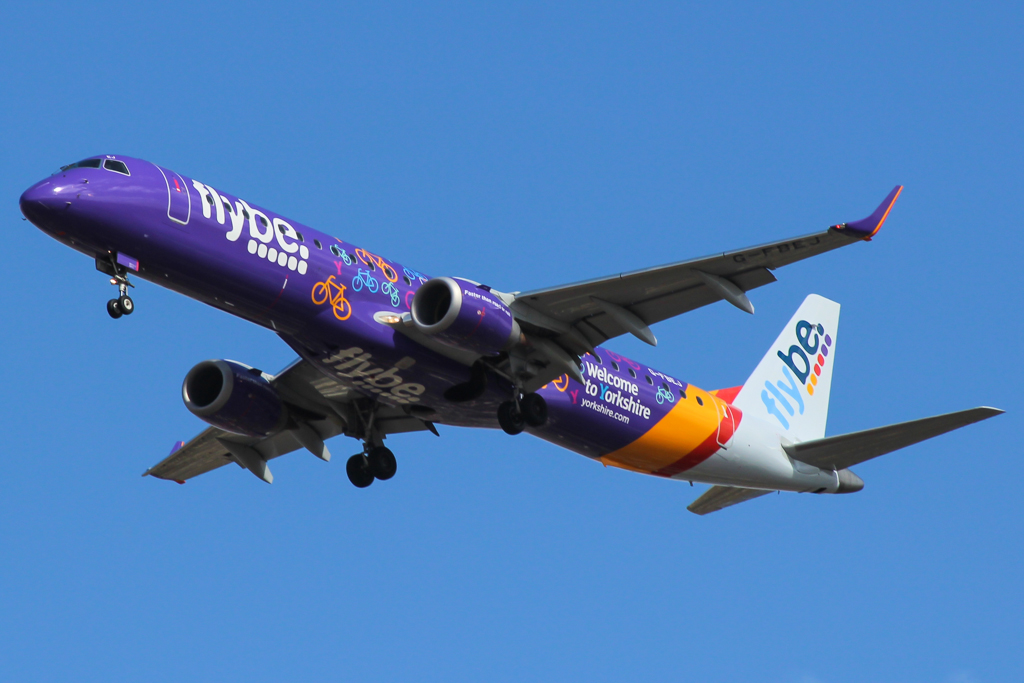
Flybe Embraer 195 with the "Welcome to Yorkshire" special livery landing at Glasgow Airport, 2016

The airline placed an order for 14 Embraer 195 aircraft in June 2005, plus options on an additional 12 aircraft, making it the type's worldwide launch customer. In the same month, four existing Bombardier Dash 8 Q400 options were converted into firm orders; after delivery its fleet of Q400s numbered 45. Flybe received its first 118-seat Embraer 195 in September 2006, and the aircraft began to replace its existing BAe 146s, completing the fleet rationalisation which was started in 2003. The E-195s were fitted with a head-up guidance system (HGS) and configured to offer single-class service.

In 2018, Flybe completed a review of its future fleet deciding that the Bombardier Q400 would continue to be its core aircraft; all nine of its E195 aircraft were to be withdrawn by 2020 but some E175s would be retained for busier routes. On 3 April 2019, Flybe confirmed its intention to withdraw six of its E195s in 2019 and the remainder in 2020; its bases at Cardiff and Doncaster would be closed and these destinations served by Q400s from other bases.

The last Embraer 195 was retired and returned to its lessor on 24 February 2020.

=== Historical fleet ===
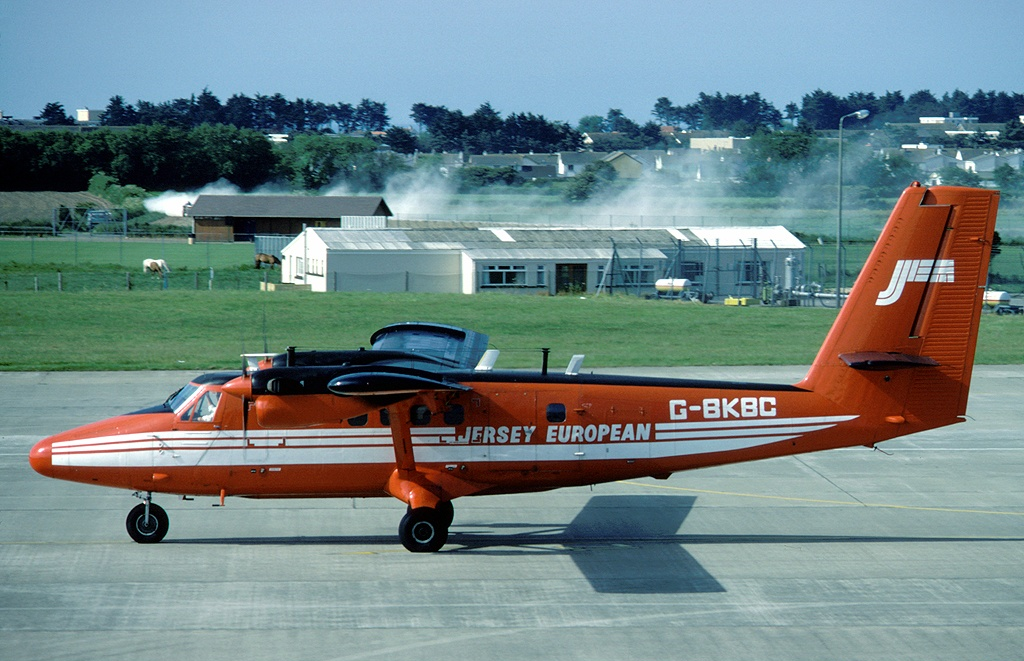
Jersey European Twin Otter, 1983

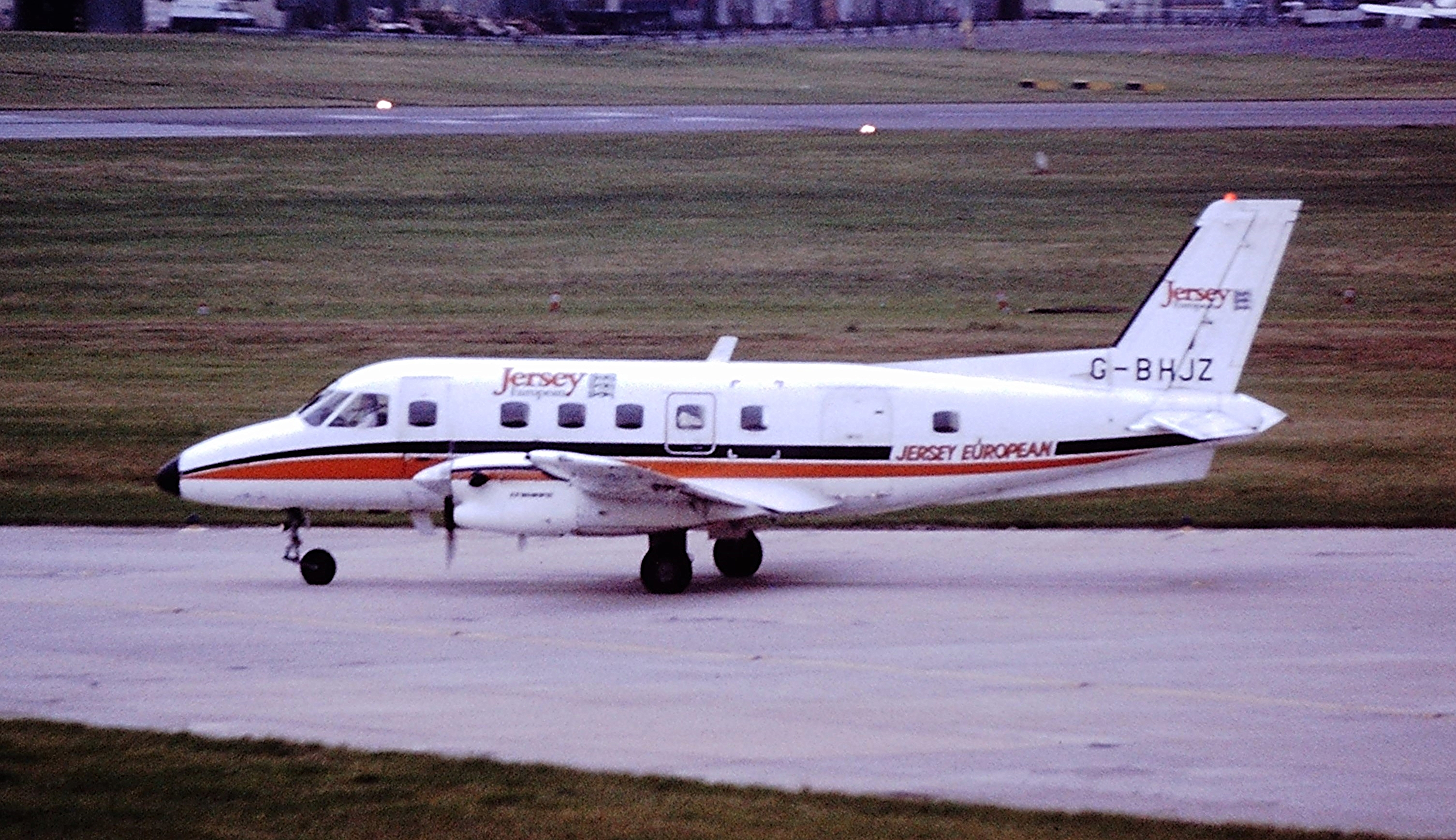
Jersey European EMB-110, 1986

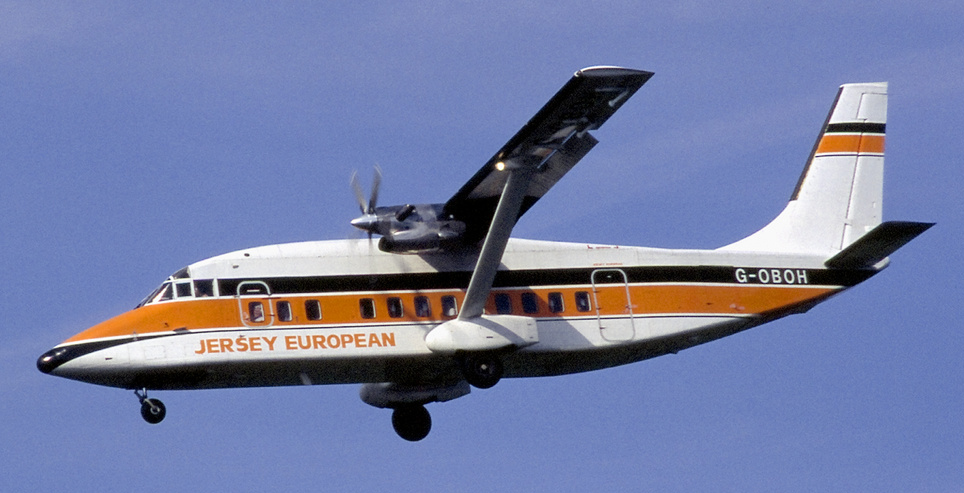
Jersey European Short 360, 1988

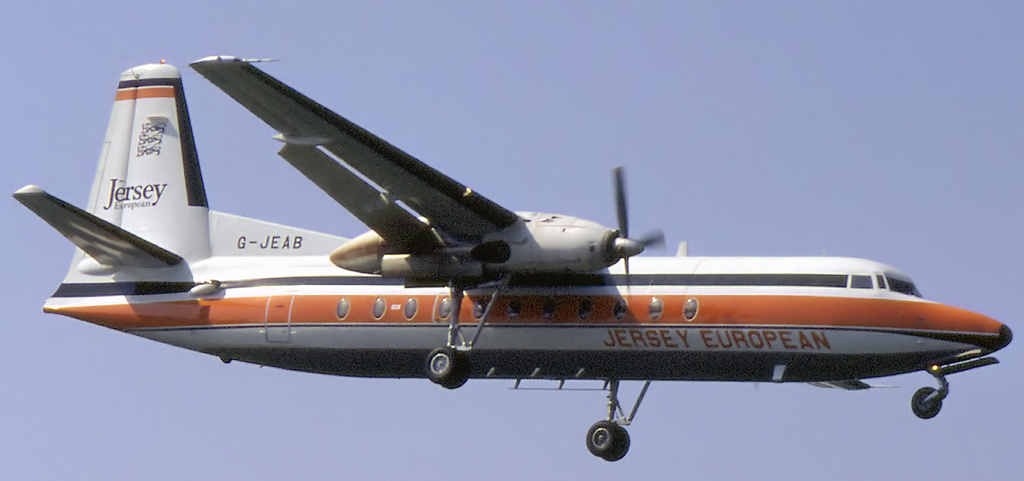
Jersey European Fokker F-27, 1988

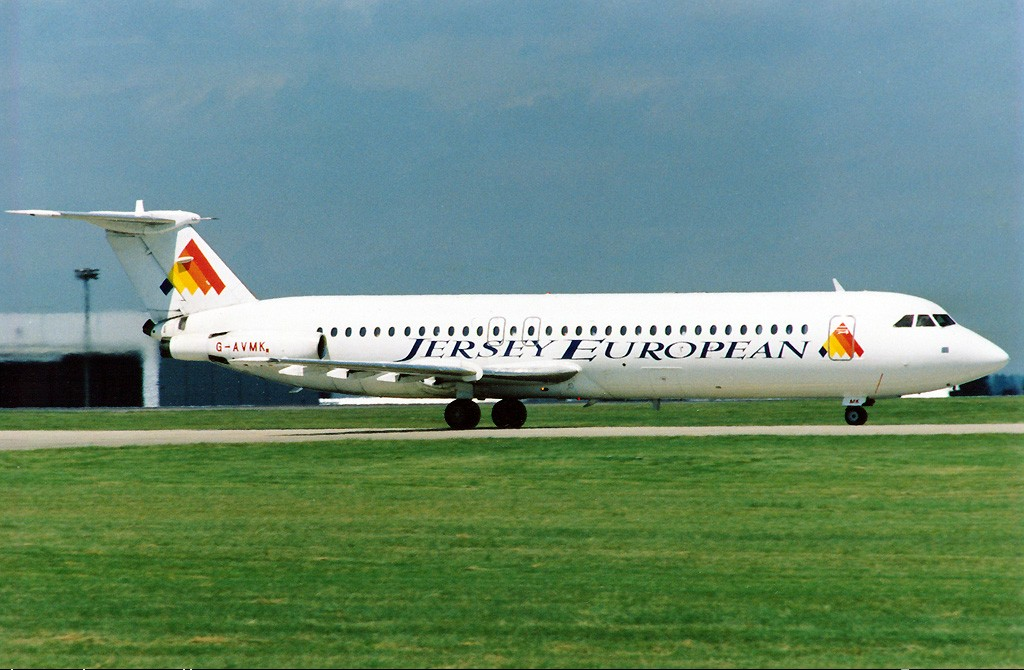
Jersey European BAC 1-11, 1998

Flybe previously operated the following aircraft:

Aircraft	Fleet	Introduced	Retired	Notes
ATR 42-500	1	2016	2018	Operated by Blue Islands
ATR 72-500	5	2014	2020	Three operated by Blue Islands and two by Stobart Air
ATR 72-600	6	2017	2020	
BAe 146-100/Avro RJ70	3	2002	2007	
BAe 146-200/Avro RJ85	9	2002	2008	
BAe 146-300/Avro RJ100	11	2002	2008	
BAe Jetstream 41	1	2017	2019	Operated by Eastern Airways
Boeing 737-300	4	2005	2006	Operated by Astraeus Airlines
Bombardier CRJ-200ER	4	2002	2003	Two operated on behalf of Air France
Britten-Norman BN-2 Islander	N/A	N/A	N/A	
de Havilland Canada Dash 8-200	3	2002	2004	
de Havilland Canada Dash 8-300	10	2002	2008	
de Havilland Canada Dash 8 Q400	81	2002	2020	
Dornier 328-100	3	2013	2017	
Douglas DC-3	2	1979	1980	Inherited from Intra Airways
Embraer 175	11	2011	2020	
Embraer 195	14	2006	2020	
Embraer EMB-110 Bandeirante	N/A	N/A	N/A	
Fokker F27 Friendship	N/A	N/A	N/A	
Saab 2000	2	2014	2017	
Saab 340B	14	2008	2017	
Short 330	N/A	N/A	N/A	
Short 360	N/A	N/A	N/A	
Vickers Viscount	N/A	N/A	N/A	

== Accidents and incidents ==
- On 23 February 2017 a De Havilland Canada Dash 8 registered G-JECP from Edinburgh to Amsterdam suffered a collapse of the right main gear upon landing at Schiphol Airport resulting in severe damage to the aircraft. Damage was found to the lower fuselage structure, right-hand outboard wing tip and nose landing gear along with damage to the right-hand fuselage caused by fragments from the right (#2) engine and debris and gravel from the runway. After the aircraft came to a stop, the crew declared a Mayday and initiated an evacuation of the aircraft. The accident was caused by deformation in the right-hand landing-gear yoke causing the landing gear to be in the down but unlocked position while the gear position indicator in the cockpit displayed three green lights falsely indicating to the crew the gear was in a down and locked position. The Dutch Safety Board made several recommendations to Bombardier, Flybe and the landing gear manufacturer.
- On 10 November 2017 a Flybe De Havilland Canada Dash 8 suffered a nose gear failure after takeoff from Belfast City Airport to Inverness Airport, diverting to Belfast International Airport and partially landing on its nose. The underside of the nose, forward pressure bulkhead, and the nose gear as well as its doors were damaged and there were two injuries. The accident was caused by a faulty sensor causing the doors to close onto the gear while it retracted. Flybe inspected their entire fleet. The Air Accidents Investigation Branch noted the aircraft and landing gear manufacturers were already working on a revised design prior to the accident.
