= Flybe (2022–2023) =

Regional airline of the United Kingdom

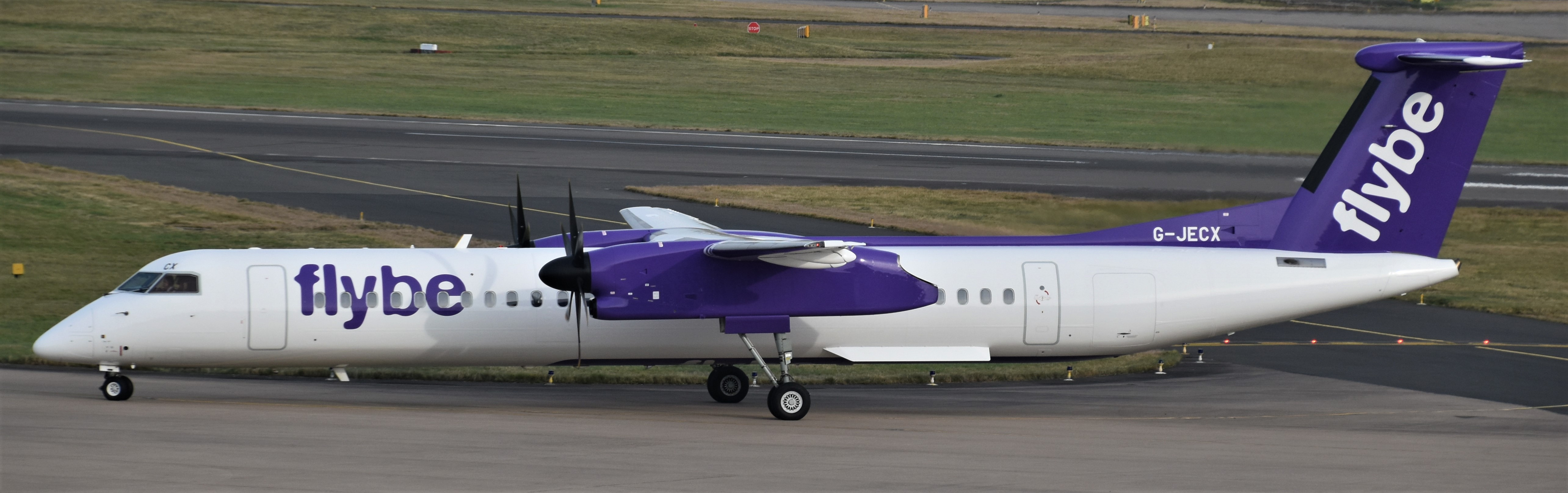
- De Havilland Dash 8 Q400
IATA	ICAO	Call sign
BE	BEE	JERSEY
- Founded: April 2021
- Commenced operations: 13 April 2022
- Ceased operations: 28 January 2023
- AOC #: 2470
- Hubs: Belfast–City; Birmingham
- Fleet size: 8
- Destinations: 17
- Parent company: Cyrus Capital Partners
- Headquarters: Birmingham Airport, Bickenhill, England
- Key people: David Pflieger (CEO); Kevin Hatton (Chairman)
- Website: flybe.com

Flybe (pronounced /ˈflaɪˌbiː/), styled as flybe, was a British regional airline based at Birmingham Airport, England. In 2022 it commenced operations using the name of a former airline, but ceased them and entered administration on 28 January 2023.

== History ==
=== Predecessor ===
The airline traces its history back to Jersey European Airways, which was set up in 1979 after the merger of both Intra Airways and Express Air Services scheduled operations. The company was renamed British European Airways in June 2000 and branded Flybe in July 2002. In November 2006, Flybe purchased BA Connect, thereby becoming the largest regional airline in Europe. On 5 March 2020, the airline filed for administration and ceased all operations.

=== Relaunch ===
On 19 October 2020, reports emerged that Lucien Farrell, in charge of former shareholder Cyrus Capital's European office had formed a new company, Thyme Opco, to purchase the Flybe brand and relaunch the airline, subject to regulatory approvals. The new owner planned to "start small and restore regional connectivity in the UK" from 2021. On 1 December 2020, Thyme Opco applied for a UK operating licence. Thyme Opco also registered a 21-year-old de Havilland Canada Dash 8 Q400, which was expected to be the first aircraft for the 'new Flybe'.

In April 2021, the British Civil Aviation Authority granted the new airline an operating licence as well as Type A and B route licences, enabling the carrier to operate both charter and scheduled services. The new company also obtained 86 slots at Heathrow Airport in London for the summer 2021 season, to be used for flights to Edinburgh and Aberdeen. The 'original' Flybe company was renamed FBE Realisations 2021 Limited, with Thyme Opco Limited becoming Flybe Ltd.

On 3 June 2021, the operating licence for the original company was revoked following an unsuccessful appeal to the Transport Secretary. Despite initial beliefs that its legacy slots at UK airports had returned to the slot coordinator, this was shown not to be the case by coordinator ACL. The new operating company also leased Heathrow slots from British Airways for routes to Edinburgh and Aberdeen. On 26 October 2021, the new Flybe Limited confirmed that it had appointed David Pflieger as its chief executive. That closely followed the appearance of an ex-Flybe Q400, registered as G-JECX, which had been painted with a new purple-and-white livery. In November 2021, the airline announced that it had picked Birmingham Airport as its new base, with operations scheduled to begin in early 2022 to "key regions across the UK and EU".

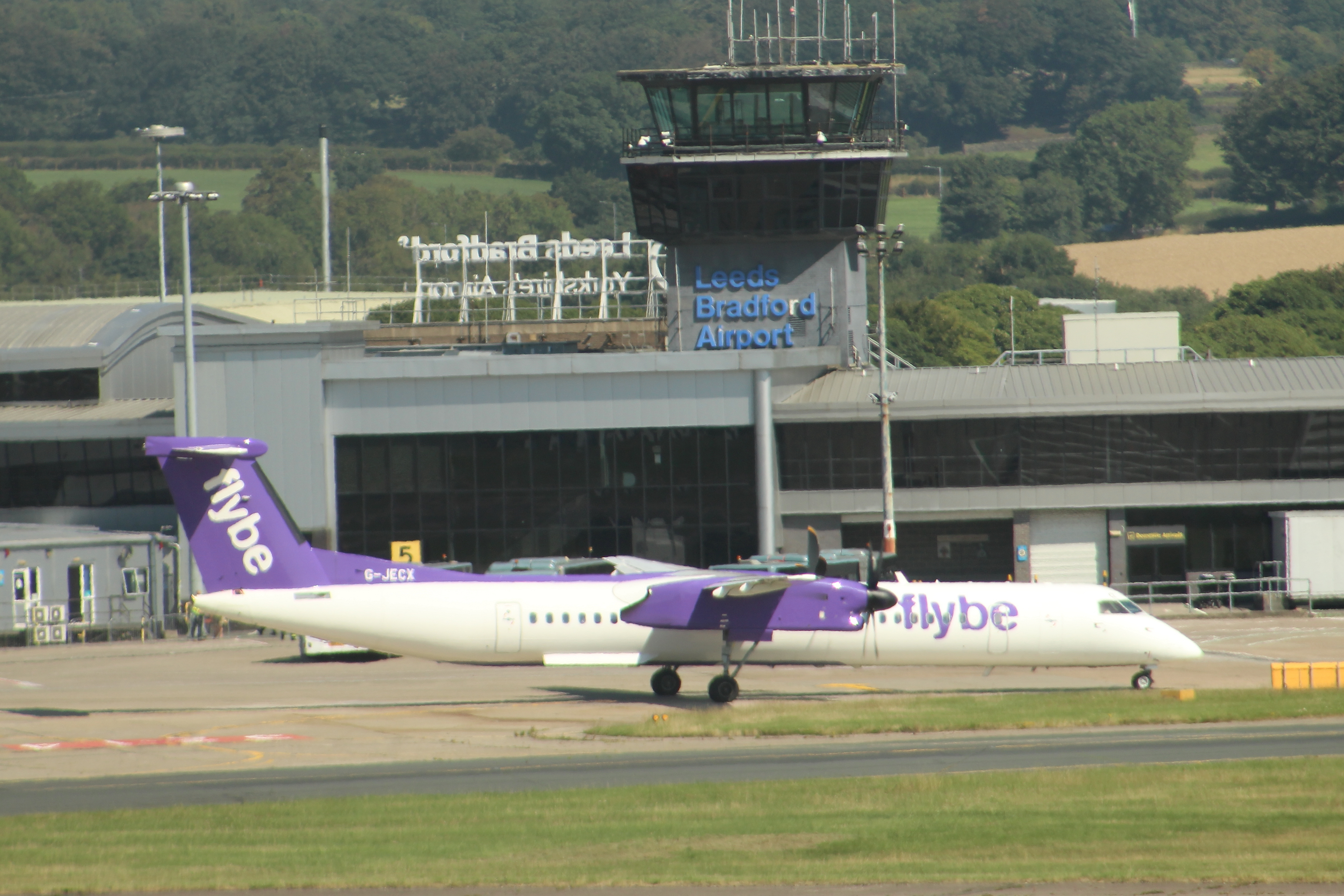
de Havilland Canada Dash 8 Q400 at Leeds Bradford Airport, 2022

On 16 March 2022, Flybe announced that Belfast City Airport in Belfast, Northern Ireland would be the airline's second operating base. The company slogan was "Smile and go the extra mile". The first flight took place between Birmingham and Belfast on 13 April 2022. The company aimed to operate up to 530 flights per week on 23 routes, using a fleet of up to 32 Q400 aircraft.

=== Decline ===
Throughout its first months of operation, Flybe faced several operational issues, which it blamed on late aircraft deliveries. Twelve weeks after its launch, the company cancelled three routes, and reduced frequencies on five others but stated that they would return to their original frequencies during the winter. Planned services from Aberdeen Airport in Scotland to Belfast, as well as Inverness Airport in Scotland to both Belfast and Birmingham never commenced. In September, the airline announced new service to the Isle of Man from Belfast and London, however cancelled both services less than a month later, two days before the inaugural flights. The company was criticised for giving Isle of Man's airport less than 30 minutes notice of its intention to cancel service, and then announcing similar routes from Newcastle International Airport on a near identical schedule. Despite saying that the cancellation was due to aircraft shortages, the airline was required by Heathrow authorities to continue operating the route if it was to retain its highly valuable slots at the airport.

In October 2022, Flybe ceased flights between Leeds and London, largely due to low demand as a result of competition from rail networks, and confirmed that it would not be resuming services. In the same month, the airline suspended flights to Southampton Airport planning to restart in February 2023, and further reduced frequencies again blaming late aircraft deliveries, despite having taken delivery of two additional aircraft which were reportedly unable to provide sufficient capacity.

=== Demise ===
On 28 January 2023, administrators were appointed and the airline ceased all operations. About 75,000 passengers had their flights cancelled, including around 2,500 who had been due to fly that day. There were 321 Flybe staff at the time and 277 were declared redundant. In a response, competitors easyJet and Ryanair encouraged the laid off staff to apply for jobs in their companies. Aer Lingus Regional announced that it would serve destinations previously operated by Flybe from Belfast.

The administrators expressed hopes that a rescue deal could be struck and noted their intent "to preserve scaled-back elements of the operating platform for a short period". In that respect, the administrators applied for a temporary operating licence, valid for up to 12 months to enable a restructuring proposal to be developed. Talks were held with the Lufthansa and Air France-KLM groups, which were both potentially interested in buying Flybe's assets including in particular its slots at Heathrow and Schiphol. The Heathrow slots were held by Flybe as part of the conditions imposed by competition regulators following British Airways' 2012 acquisition of BMI (British Midland International), and cannot be sold separately but only acquired as part of the business. Despite "intensive" discussions with interested parties, no agreement was reached and on 15 February the administrators announced that the company would be wound down and the aircraft returned to lessors.

The airline lost an average of £4 million to £5 million per month, and as of March 2023, administrators expect the total deficiency, after realising the airline's assets and paying preferential creditors, to amount to £82 million. Flybe's landing slots at Heathrow have reverted to British Airways and the slots at Schiphol have been taken by the Dutch slot allocation authority.

== Corporate affairs ==
The company's head office is on the second floor of Diamond House at Birmingham Airport, within the metropolitan borough of Solihull.

=== Parent company ===
Flybe Limited, founded in September 2020 as Thyme Opco, is a private limited company which is owned by Thyme Investco Limited - the majority of whose shares are held by DLP Holdings SARL, an affiliate of American hedge fund Cyrus Capital Partners. That was the same company which was involved in the purchase of the original Flybe in 2019.

=== Services ===
Flybe's Q400 airliners were outfitted with 78 all-economy seats and several different ticketing options were available. Passengers received a complimentary drink and snack on board, regardless of fare.

== Fleet ==
Before entering administration, Flybe expected to expand to a total of 32 aircraft. Nordic Aviation Capital expected to lease 12 aircraft to Flybe, and Aergo Capital was to supply a further five.

Aircraft	Total	Orders	Passengers	Remarks
de Havilland Canada Dash 8 Q400	9	—	78	
