= Ewood Park =

Football stadium in Lancashire, England

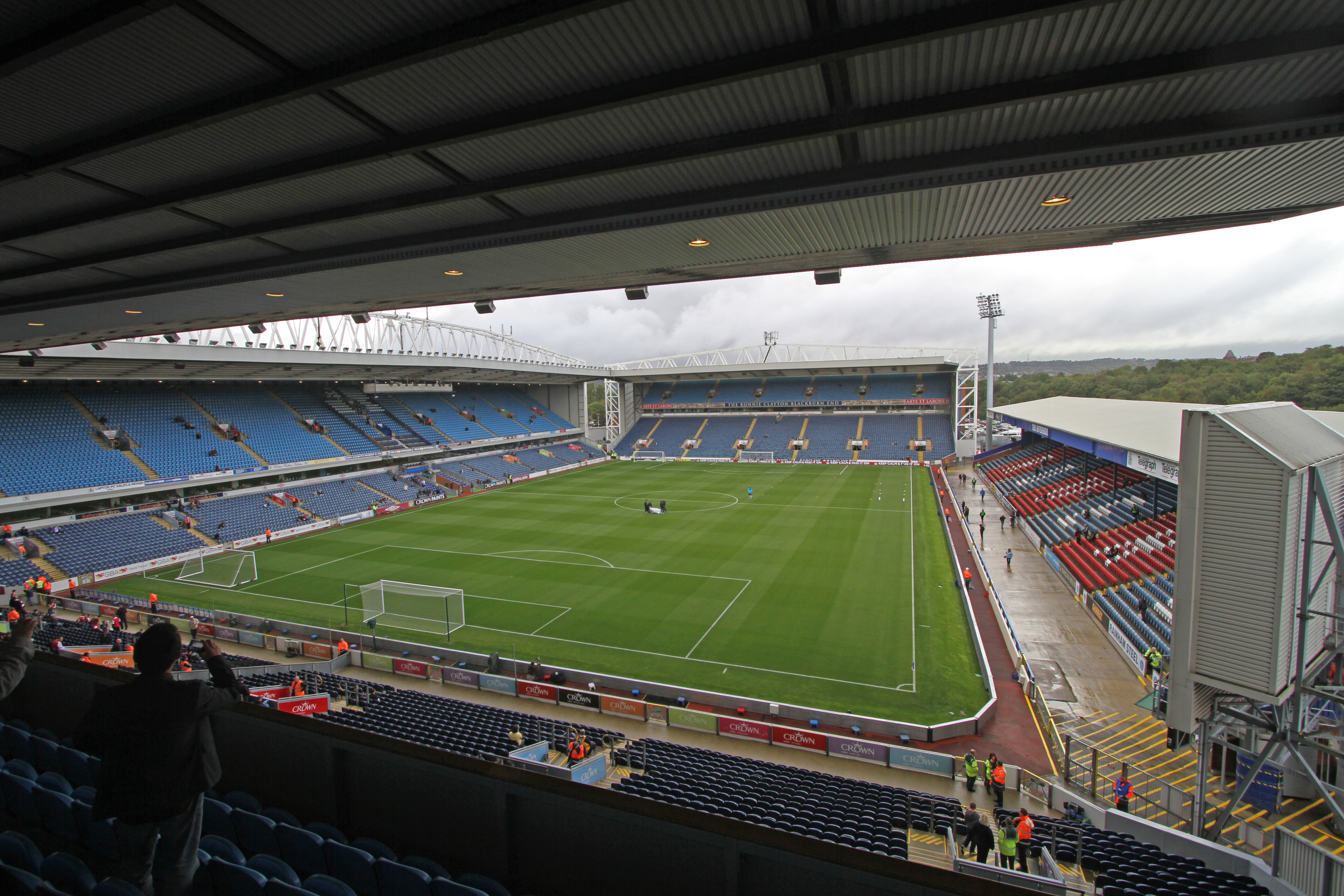

- Location in Blackburn
- Full name: Ewood Park
- Address: Nuttall Street
- Location: Blackburn; Lancashire, England; BB2 4JF
- Coordinates: 53°43′43″N 2°29′21″W
- Capacity: 31,367
- Field size: 115 yd × 76 yd (105 m × 69 m)

Construction
- Built: 1882
- Opened: April 1882
- Renovated: 1913, 1928, 1955, 1988, 1995

Tenants
- Blackburn Rovers (1881, 1890–present); Blackburn Rovers Women (2024–present)

Ewood Park (/ˈiːwʊd/) is a football stadium in Blackburn, Lancashire, England, and the home of Blackburn Rovers, founding members of the Football League and Premier League, who have played there since 1890. It is an all seater multi-sports facility with a capacity of 31,367, and four sections: the Bryan Douglas Darwen End, The Ronnie Clayton Blackburn End, the Riverside Stand, and Jack Walker Stand, named after Blackburn industrialist and club supporter, Jack Walker. The football pitch within the stadium measures 115 by 76 yards (105 m × 69 m)

== The "old" Ewood ==
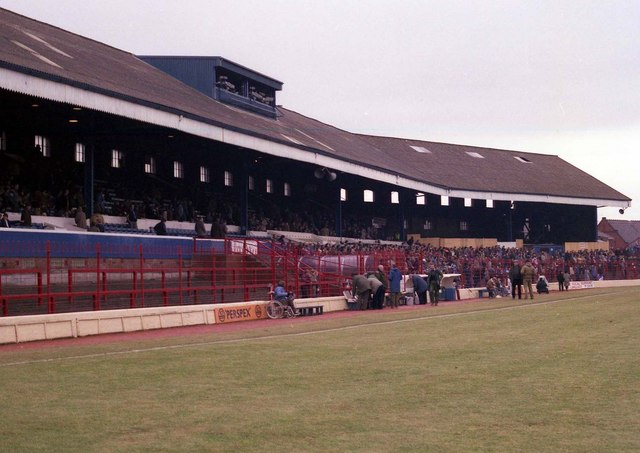
Ewood Park Nuttall Street Stand in 1985

Football had been played on the site since at least 1881; Rovers played four matches there when it was known as Ewood Bridge and was most likely little more than a field. Their first match was against Sheffield Wednesday on 9 April 1881.

Ewood Park was officially opened in April 1882 and during the 1880s staged football, athletics and some form of greyhound racing (not oval). Rovers moved back in during 1890, signing a ten-year lease at an initial annual rent of £60. Their first match at the ground was against Accrington in September. In 1893, Blackburn Rovers bought the freehold of the ground for £2500, but came close to disaster soon after when part of a stand collapsed under the weight of a 20,000 strong crowd for the visit of Everton.

In 1903, a roof was built on the Darwen End of the ground, at a cost of £1,680. The stand now held 12,000 spectators.

In 1904, the Nuttall Street Stand was built, based on designs by the architect Archibald Leitch, at a cost of £24,000. The stand was first used by supporters on New Year's Day 1907 for a match against Preston North End. In 1905, the textile baron Laurence Cotton became chairman and set about overhauling both team and ground. In 1906, construction started on a new main stand seating 4,112 on its upper tier with a paddock for 9,320 in front with changing rooms and offices underneath, cranked at one end to follow the angle of Nuttall Street.

=== 1913 terrorist incident ===
An attempt was made to destroy the ground in 1913. As part of the suffragette bombing and arson campaign, suffragettes carried out a series of bombings and arson attacks nationwide to support their campaign for women's suffrage. In November 1913, suffragettes attempted to burn down Ewood Park's grandstand but were foiled. In the same year, suffragettes succeeded in burning down Arsenal's then South London stadium, and also attempted to burn down Preston North End's ground. More traditionally male sports were targeted in order to protest against male dominance.

=== Later 20th century ===
The Nuttall Street stand changed very little until a fire in 1984 in the Blackburn End corner of the Stand. The club took the opportunity to redevelop this section of the stand with executive boxes and glass-fronted lounge overlooking the ground. The development cost £250,000 and was named the John Lewis Complex, after the club's founder.

The Blackburn End is so named as the town of Blackburn lies behind the stand and is for home supporters. The Blackburn End was terraced in 1928, but did not acquire its concrete cantilever roof until 1960, which was financed after an FA Cup run to the 1960 FA Cup Final.

A double tiered Riverside Stand was built in 1913, bringing the capacity of Ewood Park up to 70,886 with 7,000 seats. In 1928 the Riverside Stand roof was re-roofed for a total outlay of £1,550.

Ewood Park saw its largest crowd – 62,522 for the visit of Bolton Wanderers in 1929. Floodlights were installed in 1958 and were first used in a friendly against Werder Bremen.

== The "new" Ewood ==
After selling Walkersteel to British Steel Corporation for £330 million, Jack Walker decided to buy Blackburn Rovers and set about changing Ewood Park to one of the most advanced grounds in the country. Having gained full control of Blackburn Rovers by the end of the 1990–91 season and funded the construction of the new stand to replace the Riverside Stand three years before, Walker unveiled plans to rebuild the three other sides of Ewood Park and in June 1992 the local council plans for three new stands to be built, which would give the club an all-seater stadium with a capacity of more than 31,000. By February 1994, the new two-tiered Blackburn and Darwen End stands were opened with car parks situated behind both stands. This had involved the demolition of terraced houses in Nuttall Street and also the demolition of Fernhurst Mill.

The ground's transformation was complete when in August 1994, the Jack Walker Stand was opened on the site of the old Nuttall Street Stand. The new Ewood Park was officially opened in November 1995 which Blackburn Rovers marked the occasion with a 7–0 win over Nottingham Forest.

=== The Jack Walker Stand ===
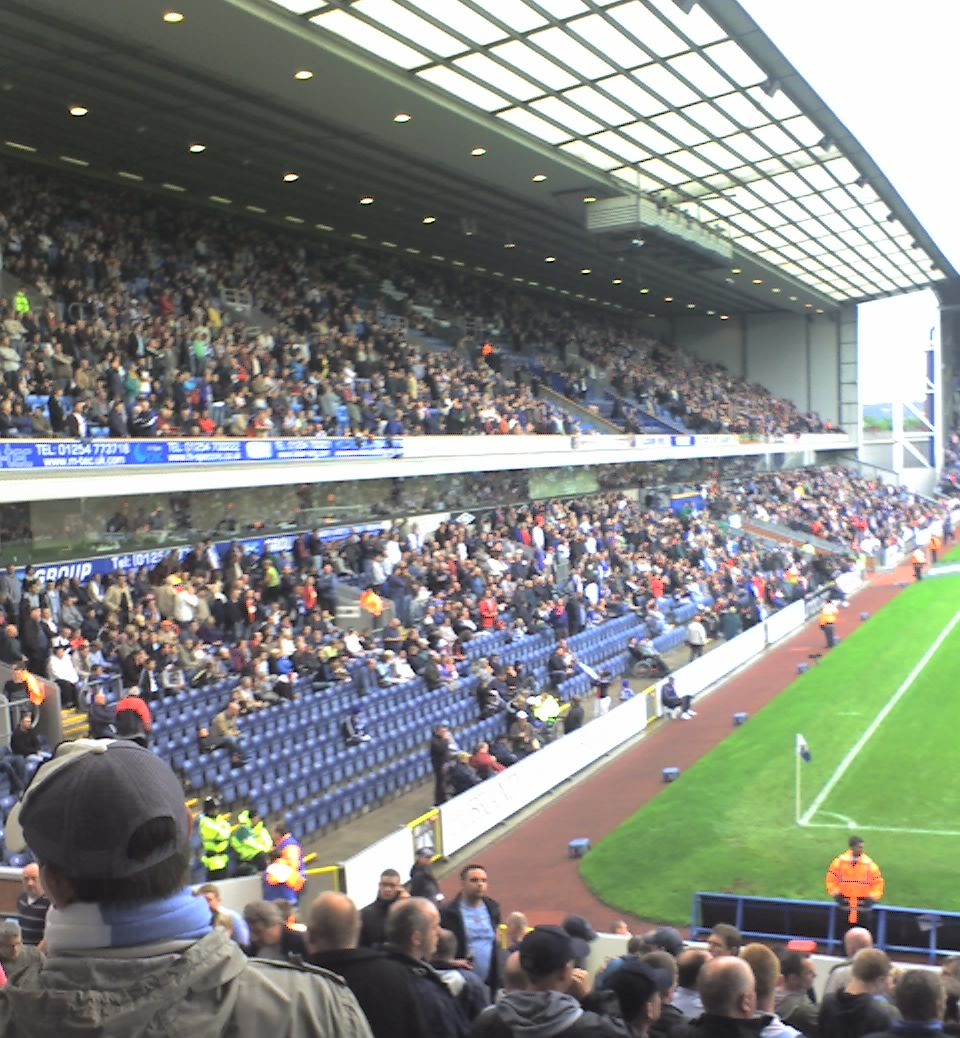
The Jack Walker Stand view from the Darwen End

The biggest stand at Ewood is named after former club owner Jack Walker (1929–2000). It has 11,000 seats and is one of three stands that were built during Ewood Park's ground redevelopment in the first half of the 1990s. This stand contains the home and away dressing rooms and media/conferencing facilities. Furthermore, the stand is home to the Premier Suite and Jack's Kitchen which form part of the club's hospitality packages in partnership with multinational corporation Sodexo. The neighbouring houses in Nuttall Street were demolished to make way for it.

=== The Ronnie Clayton Blackburn End ===
The modern Blackburn End Stand has 8,000 seats and was constructed in the early 1990s. The boardroom in the Nuttall Street Stand was dismantled piece by piece and, when rebuilding was finished, reassembled in the Blackburn End. The lower-tier houses some of the more vocal Rovers supporters. The rear of the stand is also home to a memorial garden and a statue of Jack Walker entitled "Rovers' Greatest Supporter". Outside the stand is the Blackburn Rovers club shop "Roverstore" which was revamped in 2008. The home supporters ticket office and "Blues" cafe bar is situated in the lower reaches of the stand. From here ground tours were led by former Rovers player, Ronnie Clayton (1934–2010) until his death in October 2010; it was renamed in his honour less than a year later. The stand is home to the "Strikers Lounge" where members of the club's junior membership scheme "Team Rovers" congregate before and after matches. The Bob Crompton (1879–1941) suite and Executive Boxes are also located in the stand.

On 13 August 2011, as a sign of respect to the late and long-serving Rover Ronnie Clayton, it was announced at half-time during the first game of the 2011–12 Premier League season that The Blackburn End was to be renamed The Ronnie Clayton End.

=== The RFS Riverside Stand ===
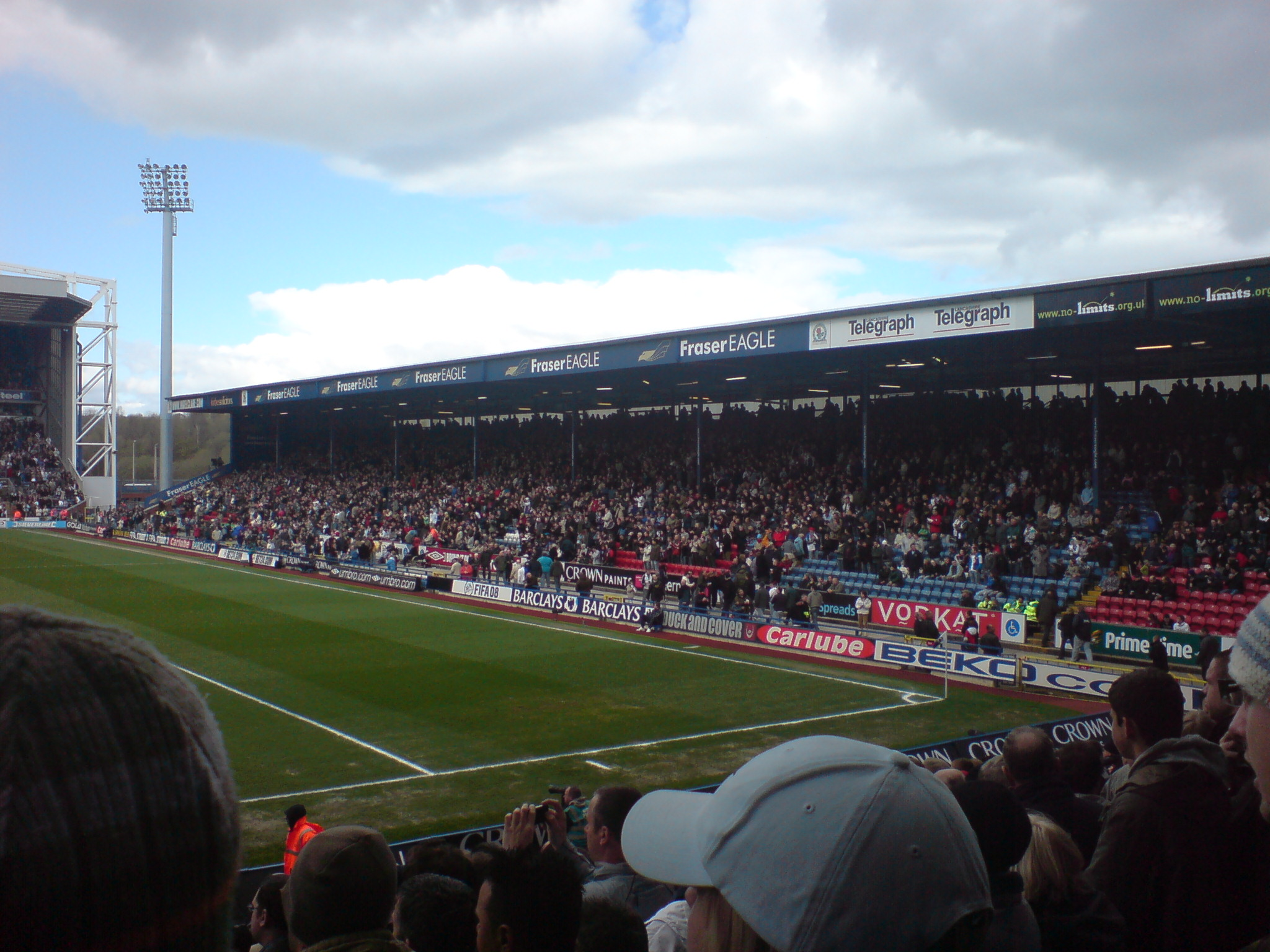
The RFS Riverside Stand

It was not until 1988 that the old Riverside Stand was replaced by a new stand. The old stand had failed a safety check in 1985 that came in the aftermath of the Bradford City stadium fire; a new, single-tier stand housing over 1,000 (700 seated approx.). The material for the new roof and terracing was provided by local steel firm, Walkersteel, owned by the man who was soon to buy the club, Jack Walker. Further development of the Riverside Stand took place in 1990 with further seats being added. The stand is currently sponsored by Regulatory Finance Solutions (RFS).

The Riverside Stand is now the oldest part of the modern Ewood Park. It is the only single tiered stand in the ground, the seating spells out the word "ROVERS" – the club's nickname. The stand holds approximately 6,000 spectators. At the corner of the stand is a giant TV screen showing features, teamsheets and other live games on a match day. Since around the year 2000, there have been plans to redevelop the stand, which would raise Ewood Park's capacity by around 9,000 to 40,000. However, these plans have yet to materialise, and were not even realised during Blackburn's long spell in the Premier League.

=== The Bryan Douglas Darwen End ===
The Darwen End is so named after the town of Darwen which is situated just beyond Blackburn's southern borders.

The modern Darwen End was built in 1993 and holds 8,000 seats. The stand houses both home and away supporters in a two tier stand mirroring the Blackburn End in both appearance and capacity. The stand houses the club's education department which attracts youngsters from the surrounding areas for football-based activities in the classroom. The stand is home to the "Legend's Lounge" and International hospitality suites. Behind the stand is the Blackburn Rovers Indoor Centre which provides facilities for community coaching, football leagues and soccer schools. Fernhurst Mill, which stood to the rear of the former Darwen End terrace, was demolished to make way for the new stand as well as a new car park to serve the stadium.

On 1 November 2012, the Darwen End was renamed as a tribute to club legend Bryan Douglas. He said of the honour: "The first person to congratulate me was Ronnie's wife Val. He is at one end of the ground and I'm at the other end and long may that continue. We were great friends. They have put me at the right end as well. I was born just 400 yards away from the Darwen End. It is a really proud moment".

== Other uses ==
Though primarily the home ground for Blackburn Rovers, Ewood Park has seen other usage, including hosting the 1941 Football League War Cup Final Replay. The ground was given the honour of hosting an international – England v Scotland in 1891 and England v Wales in 1924. Six FA Cup semi finals were played at the venue between 1893 and 1947. On 9 November 2002, Ewood Park hosted Great Britain's rugby league test match against New Zealand, which was part of their tour of Great Britain and France. The tourists won 30 – 16 with 16,654 in attendance. The ground has also hosted numerous England U21 internationals including England v Wales in 2004. The stadium hosted three matches during the Women's Euro 2005 competition – two England matches in group play, and the final. In 2014, the official supporters trust of the club, Rovers Trust, successfully applied to register the stadium as an Asset of Community Value, In June 2017, the ground hosted a pop concert by Elton John.

In May 2022, the stadium was opened for Muslims to perform the Eid al-Fitr prayer.

== Records ==
Record Attendance:

- 61,783 v Bolton Wanderers, 2 March 1929 – FA Cup 6th Round

Record League Attendance:

- 52,656 v Preston North End, 26 December 1921 – Football League Division One

== See also ==
- List of football stadiums in England
- Lists of stadiums

Preceded by Donaustadion; Ulm	UEFA Women's Euro; Final Venue; 2005	Succeeded by Olympic Stadium; Helsinki
