= Jim French (businessman) =

James French CBE DL (born 4 July 1953) is the former chairman and CEO of the airline Flybe. He owned approximately 7% of the overall business.

== History ==
French began his aviation career in 1970 with Caledonian Airways, before joining AirUK in 1980 French first joined Flybe in 1990, when it was known as Jersey European Airways; becoming commercial director shortly after. He subsequently became deputy Chief Executive and Chief Operating Officer. In 2001, French became chief executive of Flybe and became chairman in 2005.

French retired as CEO of Flybe in August 2013 and became non-executive chairman. Saad Hammad, formerly of EasyJet airline, became CEO and Simon Laffin became Chairman.

== Awards ==
French was appointed a CBE in 2009.

He is a Deputy Lieutenant of Devon.
