= Gama Aviation =

British aviation services company

Gama Aviation Plc
- Type: Public limited company
- Founded: 1983; 43 years ago
- Headquarters: Farnborough, United Kingdom
- Key people: Simon To, Chairman; Marwan Khalek, Group Chief Executive Officer; Neil Medley, Chief Operating Officer
- Website: www.gamaaviation.com

Gama Aviation Plc (AIM: GMAA) is a British business aviation services company provides aviation support for individuals, corporations, and government agencies. The company has two service divisions: Air and Ground. It was founded in 1983 by Marwan Khalek and Stephen Wright, who currently hold the positions of Chief Executive Officer and Chief Compliance Officer respectively. Sir Ralph Robins, was the group's chairman.

== Air division ==
=== Air services ===
Since 1983, the company's managed fleet has grown through organic growth and mergers and acquisitions, including the reverse takeover of Hangar 8, the acquisition of Aviation Beauport, and, most recently, the merger of its US Air division with that of BBA Aviation.

The company added more services with the addition of FlyerTech, the development of flight training services, and its own in-house pilot ground school.

The Scottish Air Ambulance Services (SAS) contract covers fixed-wing aircraft and helicopters in addition to the coordination and operational management of all flights. This long-term contract resulted in the company's creation of the ScotSTAR facility at Glasgow Airport.

In the United States, the company provides similar turnkey support for the private aviation membership club Wheels Up. The company currently provides all operational support, pilots and pilot training for a fleet of King Air 350i and Cessna Citation XLS aircraft.

== Ground division ==
=== Ground services ===
Gama Aviation provides maintenance support for a variety of business aircraft across its network of bases.

The company also provides fleet support. In the US, this includes the aircraft of Wheels Up utilising Textron Aviation's Citation XLS+ and the Beech King Air. In January 2017, the company's Europe Ground division announced a 15-aircraft fleet agreement with Wijet to provide maintenance support across Europe for AOG, line and base maintenance.

As with the Air division, the company holds contracts with organisations such as NHS Scotland, the Ministry of Defence, and primary contractors such as Atkins. These contracts have included updates to the Royal Air Force primary trainer fleet and the Army Air Corps Gazelle fleet.

=== Geographic development of the ground division ===
Gama Aviation has a network of bases in the US (Bedford HF, Bridgeport, Chicago, Dallas, Las Vegas, Palm Beach, St. Louis, Teterboro, Van Nuys, White Plains) and UK (Farnborough, Aberdeen, Fairoaks, Glasgow, Jersey, Kennington, Doncaster, Waddington, Oxford). There are also additional maintenance facilities in Nice, Sarjah, and most recently, Hong Kong.

== Litigation ==
In July 2017, Gama faced a High Court claim brought against it by Dustin Dryden, CEO of Hangar8, for £6.1 million. The counterclaim was a reaction to an allegation made against Dryden in November 2016, which alleged that Gama Aviation provided services and spare parts to Dryden, who failed to pay. Dryden claimed in response that the work was not performed properly and some of the spare parts had been pledged to another company.

Dryden claimed that, rather than a dispute over his conduct as director, there had been a "departure agreement" including a promise to sell his 5% stake in Gama and spend the proceeds with the company in order to help it hit second-half financial targets in 2015. Gama also attempted to impound one of Dryden's planes, which they claim Dryden unlawfully seized back. Dryden admitted to taking the jet back, but denied any legal wrongdoing.

Gama Aviation informed investors only after the suit was made public by newspapers, making an announcement to the London stock exchange. Its share price fell shortly afterwards. In response to the allegations made by Dryden, Gama Aviation announced that it would not comment while legal action was ongoing, but did release a background statement. Following this, Gama took out an injunction, forbidding newspapers from naming most of its clients. Dryden and Gama had settled the case in June 2018, with Dryden handing over cash and assets.

A further case was brought against Gama Aviation by Credit Suisse. The bank filed a High Court claim stating that Gama had not turned over a private jet that Credit Suisse was entitled to sell after Challenger-Mondel, who financed the purchase of the aircraft, defaulted on a loan. In addition to this, the millionaire Andre Serruys has also taken action, alleging that the company overbilled him and performed sub-standard technical upgrades while under the management and maintenance control of Hangar8. As of January 2018, Gama is potentially exposed to $15.3 million in damages from claimants.
