= Jack Walker =

British industrialist and businessman

- Jack Walker at Ewood Park at an unknown date between 1991 and 2000
- Born: 19 May 1929; Blackburn, Lancashire, England
- Died: 17 August 2000 (aged 71); St Helier, Jersey, Channel Islands
- Occupations: Businessman; Industrialist
- Years active: 1942–2000
- Title: Owner of Walkersteel (1951–1989); Owner of Blackburn Rovers (1991–2000)

Jack Walker (19 May 1929 – 17 August 2000) was a British industrialist and businessman. Walker built his fortune in the steel industry, amassing a personal fortune of £600 million. He then went on to become the owner and benefactor of Blackburn Rovers, who won the 1994–95 FA Premier League under his ownership.

== Business ==
=== Walkersteel ===
The youngest of three children, Walker was born in Blackburn and left school at 13. Walker worked as a sheet metal worker and a conscript craftsman in the Royal Electrical and Mechanical Engineers. In 1951, following the death of his father Charles, Walker took over the family sheet metal business. Walkersteel was built from a back-street scrap metal business to a major force in the steel industry. By 1990 Walker had built up the business so successfully that it had become the largest steel stockholder in Britain, employing 3,400 people at 50 sites. In 1988 the business was making an annual profit of £48m. Walkersteel completed a major deal with GKN, purchasing subsidiary GKN Steelstock. Following this Walker decided it was the right time to sell and opened negotiations with British Steel Corporation. Walkersteel was sold for a reported £360m, the highest price ever paid for a private company at the time. Walker's sale of Walkersteel proved to be a less successful investment for its new owners British Steel, as the steel market entered a steep slump as a result of the early 1990s recession. The Walkersteel brand has been revived following Walker's death but is linked in name only.

=== Jersey European Airways ===
In November 1983, the WalkerSteel group took over Jersey European Airways, already being the parent company to Blackpool based airline Spacegrand. The two airlines were initially run separately until 1985 when they were amalgamated and Exeter became the airline's headquarters and base for technical services.

The airline grew throughout the 1990s and was recognised in 1993 and 1994 when it won 'Best UK Regional Airline'. The new millennium saw the airline announce a new brand name at the beginning of May: British European. The rebrand reflected the size and scope of what was now the UK's third-largest scheduled airline. July 2002 saw the start of a new beginning for the airline, British European was forced to dramatically change its business model to survive in such a highly competitive and aggressive new low-cost travel era. Flybe was born and along with changes to commercial, fleet and operational policies that were to transform the airline. On 5 March 2020 Flybe ceased operating and went into administration.

At the airline's Head Office in Exeter there are two buildings named in his honour: Jack Walker House and the New Walker Hangar, both based on the Exeter International Airport complex.

In 2013, Jack Walker's estate sold its entire 48.1% shareholding in Flybe.

== Blackburn Rovers ==
In 1988, Jack Walker donated building materials for the new Riverside Stand at Ewood Park. It is also thought that his money was used to pay for the acquisition and wages of Ossie Ardiles and Steve Archibald in the 1987–88 season.

Walker took full control of the club in January 1991 with the intention of turning Rovers into the greatest and most prosperous club England had ever seen. He also threatened to make Manchester United look "cheap" and further outlined his motivations in a 1992 documentary on the club. "I'm only interested in putting Rovers where they should be. Blackburn Rovers is one of the greatest football teams in England. They are one of the founder members and we want them right back on top." Within the first three years of his takeover Walker spent £25 million on new players. This included breaking the British transfer record twice, signing Alan Shearer from Southampton for £3.3 million in 1992 and Chris Sutton from Norwich City for £5 million in 1994.

The Ewood Park ground was reconstructed at a cost of more than £20 million to give it a capacity of just over 30,000, with the new Jack Walker Stand providing a lasting tribute. New training facilities and a youth academy were also constructed at Brockhall Village.

When Jack Walker bought Rovers, the 1990-91 season was half completed and they were just above the relegation zone. They had not played in the First Division since 1966 and their last major trophy had been won in 1928.

Manager Don Mackay initially used Walker's funds to make signings which helped ensure Rovers survival that season, and built the platform for a promotion challenge in 1991–92. Walker declared his ambition early on that Rovers would return to the top flight, establish themselves as a top side in England and eventually go on to compete with the very best clubs in Europe. Kenny Dalglish became manager in October 1991, and by May, Rovers had been promoted to the newly formed Premier League through the playoffs.

Walker was present at the 1994 FA Charity Shield leading the Rovers team onto the pitch at the old Wembley Stadium.

In the 1994-95 season, Rovers won the Premiership title with Manchester United finishing runners up. It was their first top division title for 81 years and their first major trophy for 67 years.

In the summer of 1996, Alan Shearer was top goalscorer at Euro 96 and was linked with a move to a host of leading English and continental clubs, but the main talk in the national media was that Shearer would join local rivals Manchester United. Jack Walker and the Lancashire Telegraph constantly dismissed rumours of Shearer joining Manchester United. Local journalist Peter White stated that the club should never be forgiven should Shearer be allowed to join Manchester United.

"Rovers should never be forgiven for allowing that to happen. They know they would never be forgiven if they let Shearer go to the club the Rovers fans love to hate. Fans might just live with a move to Barcelona or Milan but not to 'that lot.'"

Manchester United manager Alex Ferguson expressed anger over his failure to sign Alan Shearer from Blackburn Rovers. Ferguson stated: "I had a gut feeling that it wouldn't happen simply because Jack Walker hates Manchester United." Martin Edwards also confirmed Ferguson's attempt to sign Shearer had been blocked by Rovers. Ultimately Shearer moved to Newcastle United. In 2017, Edwards once again confirmed Walker's refusal to sell.

John Hall, the then Newcastle chairman, also stated that Walker did not want to sell Shearer to Manchester United.

== Personal life and death ==
Away from Walkersteel and Blackburn Rovers, Walker invested in property development in and around Blackburn. He sponsored First Tower United, and Jersey Rugby Club after moving to St Helier in 1974.

Walker's primary motto in life and most famous quote was "think big".

On 17 August 2000, Walker died at 71 from cancer.

== Legacy ==
Before his death, Walker had put in place a family trust structure to own his various business interests, including the club. Blackburn Rovers were sold by the Jack Walker settlement in November 2010 to Venky's.

In September 2001, the Jack Walker Memorial garden was unveiled at the Blackburn End of Ewood Park. Standing in the middle is a statue of Walker. A road near Ewood Park was named "Jack Walker Way" in his honour.

In 2011, former Rovers player Fred Pickering spoke highly of Walker but criticised relatives. "The big shame is what his family have done since (Walker's death), because they haven't given the club much for the last six years or so."

Also speaking in 2011, Tony Parkes attacked the Jack Walker trust. "There are three groups of people to blame for the situation the club are in - the manager, Venky's and the Walker Trust. It has to be remembered the Walker Trust were the people who brought them [Venky's] in. They wanted to get out and were taking anyone's money to do that. All three have a lot to answer for."

In 2015, former Liberal Democrat leader and Rovers fan Tim Farron publicly criticised Walker's daughter Lynda Matthewman. Farron stated: "Part of me is cross with Lynda. I have to ask did they really do due diligence on the Venky's before they sold? This meant everything to her dad and they've sold it to a bunch of clowns."
