= Intra Airways =

British airline, 1969–1979

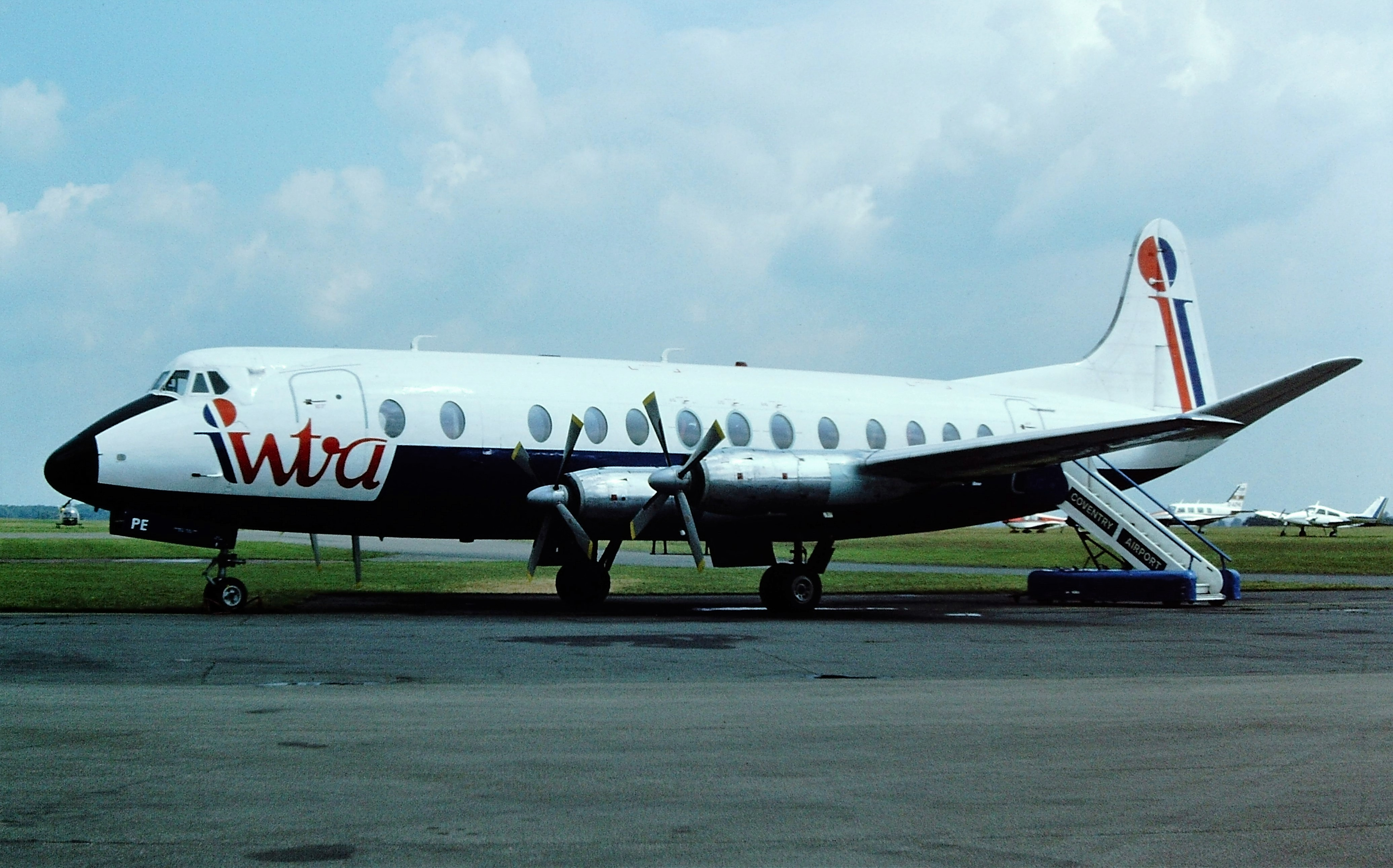
- Vickers Viscount 700 in later colours, in 1978
IATA	ICAO	Call sign
JY	—	—
- Founded: January 1969
- Commenced operations: March 1969
- Ceased operations: October 1979
- Hubs: Jersey Airport
- Destinations: British Isles, Continental Europe
- Parent company: Intra Holdings
- Headquarters: Jersey (States') Airport
- Key people: S Mansfield CBE; M.L. Thomas, Capt. G.L. Gillborn, L.C. Thomas; B. Haddican, J.H.J. Rogers, Capt D.H. Stuart, Mrs F. Geffroy, A.I. Le Gresley, Capt. P.A. Gelminster, J.D. Capstick

Intra Airways Ltd. was a private British independent airline established in 1969. Initially it operated passenger and cargo charters from the Channel Islands to the United Kingdom and Continental Europe. Scheduled services commenced in 1971. All flight operations were halted on 31 October 1979 and in the following day the assets were merged to form Jersey European Airways.

== History ==
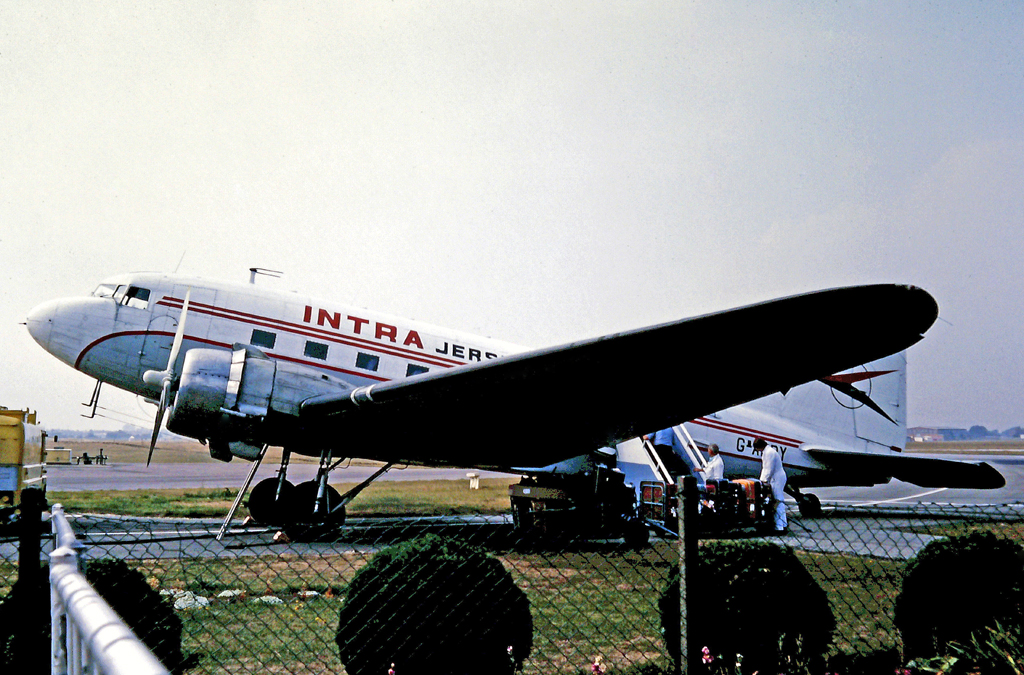
Douglas DC-3 at Gloucester (Staverton) in 1976, operating a scheduled passenger service

Intra Airways Ltd was formed on 1 January 1969 by former British United (C.I.) Airways employees to operate passenger and cargo charters from the Channel Islands to the UK and the Continent with a single Douglas DC-3. At the time of its inception, Intra Airways also applied to the Air Transport Licensing Board (ATLB) for a licence to commence scheduled services between Jersey and Guernsey. Intra Holdings Ltd of Jersey was the newly formed airline's majority shareholder. It held 90% of Intra Airways's stock. To support its fledgling operation, Intra Airways set up an associated engineering company based at Exeter Airport. The ATLB granted Intra Airways its first licence to operate scheduled services at the beginning of 1971. That licence was for the Jersey-Staverton route. It resulted in the acquisition of a second DC-3. Scheduled services commenced in April 1971, linking Jersey with Gloucester (Staverton) Airport.

In 1974, the Civil Aviation Authority (CAA), the ATLB's successor, approved Intra Airways's application for a scheduled service licence to operate 30 weekly flights between Shoreham Airport and Jersey and/or Guernsey, with an extension to Gatwick. However, the CAA's licence was for passenger services only as it had rejected Intra Airways's proposal to serve these routes with DC-3s to carry both passengers and cargo. The air carrier planned to serve these routes with Islanders. The new services were intended to replace the Shoreham-Channel Islands services previously operated by JF Airlines, while the extension to Gatwick was meant to connect with Intra Airways's Gatwick-Deauville service.

By 1978, Intra Airways operated scheduled passenger services linking Jersey with Cambridge and Gloucester (Staverton) in the UK as well as Caen, Deauville, Dinard, St Brieuc and Nantes in France, Ostend and Brussels in Belgium, and Düsseldorf in West Germany. In addition, it operated scheduled all-cargo services between Jersey and Guernsey as well as between the Channel Islands and Bournemouth (Hurn). The inter-Channel Islands cargo flights linked up with the domestic and international passenger service network.

In addition to expanding its scheduled operations, Intra Airways continued operating both ad hoc and regular series of charter flights. The latter included regular cargo flights carrying newspapers from Luton to Belfast Aldergrove operated with DC-3s at night and summer inclusive tour passenger charters from Gatwick to Dublin using Viscounts during daytime.

=== Joint operations and a full merger ===
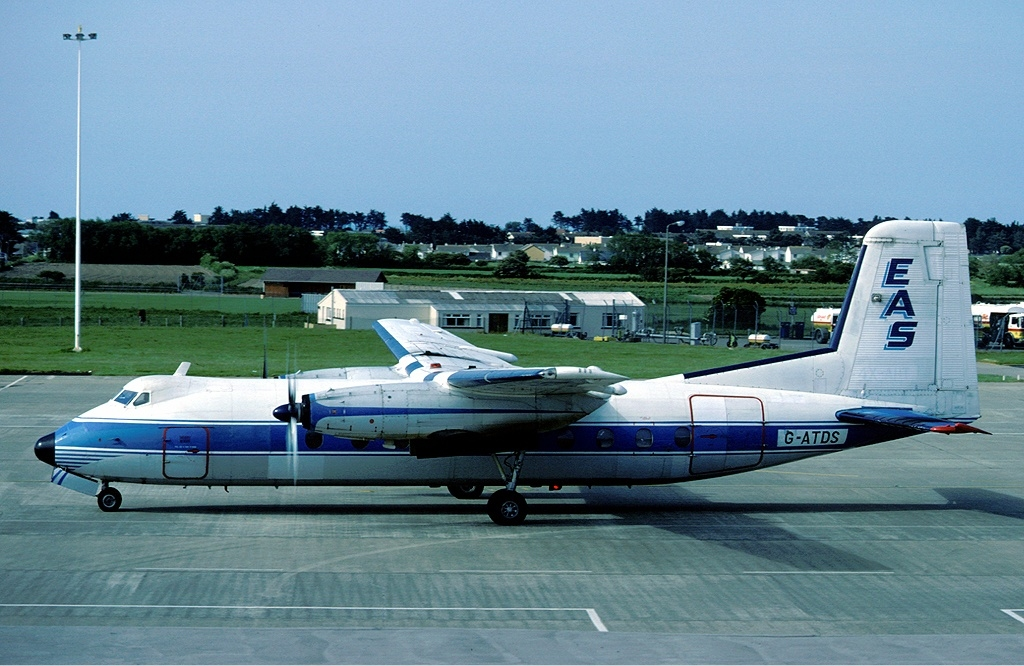
EAS Handley Page HPR-7 Herald

In January 1979 Intra Holdings Ltd sold its holding in Intra Airways. This resulted in the airline's operations merger with those of Bournemouth-based Express Air Freight (C.I.). Despite further events this association lasted until October 1980. A full-blown merger was in the air and, on October 31, 1979, Intra Airways ceased all flying activities and existed as a separate entity. The next day his assets became Jersey European Airways (JEA). Express Air Services, which took over the operation of Express Air Freight's cargo aircraft, subsequently demerged from JEA.

== Fleet ==
Intra Airways operated the following aircraft types:

- 2 x BN-2 Islander
- 6 x Douglas DC-3
- 4 x Vickers Viscount 800

=== Fleet in 1969 ===
In April 1969, the fleet of Intra Airways comprised 2 aircraft.

Aircraft type	Number
Douglas DC-3/C-47 Dakota	2
Total	2

Intra Airways employed 8 people at this time.

=== Fleet in 1978 ===
In April 1978, the fleet of Intra Airways comprised ten aircraft.

Aircraft type	Number
Vickers Viscount 800	3
Douglas DC-3/C-47 Dakota	7
Total	10

Intra Airways employed 130 people at this time.

== See also ==
- List of defunct airlines of the United Kingdom

== Notes ==
Notes

Citations
