= Aviation Beauport =

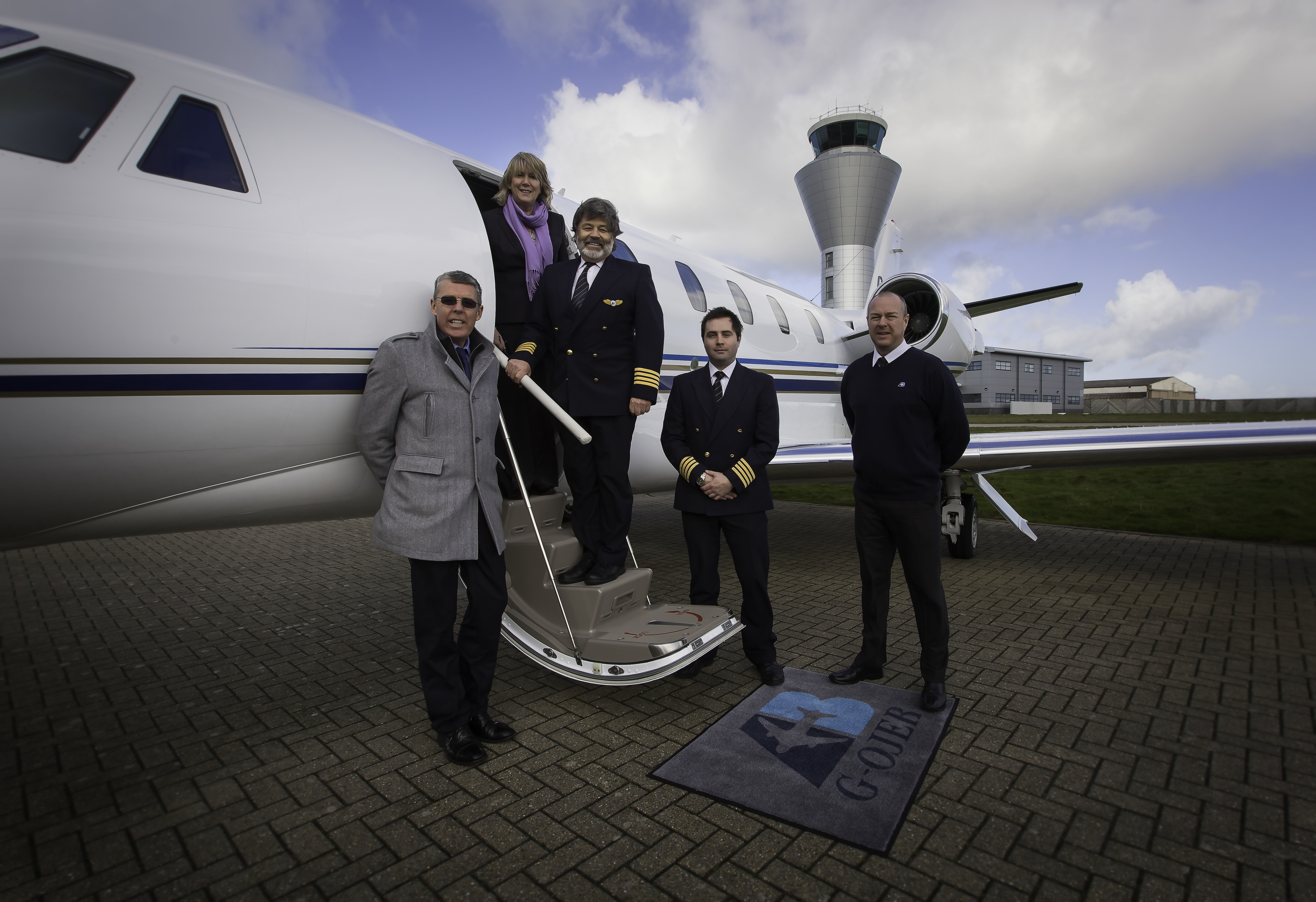
IATA	ICAO	Call sign
-	AVB	BEAUPAIR
- Founded: 1969
- Operating bases: 1
- Fleet size: 4
- Destinations: Worldwide
- Parent company: Gama Aviation
- Headquarters: Jersey Airport, Jersey
- Key people: Mike Bell, Maggie Barnes
- Website: https://www.aviationbeauport.com/

Aviation Beauport (Gama Aviation (Beauport) Limited) is a Jersey-based aviation company offering private aircraft charter, aircraft management, hangarage and handling services. The company is the only executive jet charter company in the Channel Islands to hold an Air Operators Certificate (AOC), and is the only fixed-base operator (FBO) in Jersey.

== History ==
The company was established in 1969 by chairman, Tom Clarke and managing director, Patrick Harrison. Its first aircraft was a twin-engined six-seater Piper Aztec D. The company was so named because Tom Clarke lived directly opposite Beauport Nursing Home in Jersey.

Aviation Beauport changed hands in 1972 and in the years that followed underwent several changes of ownership until 1985. At that time Greg Graham was the managing director of the air taxi division of Air Atlantique. When Air Atlantique decided to sell that part of the operation, and coincidentally Aviation Beauport came on to the market, Greg Graham approached local businessman, Mike Bell, with a plan for buying both businesses. After the purchase of the two businesses, Greg Graham was appointed managing director of the newly structured Aviation Beauport, and the scope of the company widened to include freight and handling as well as the management of private and corporate aircraft.

The company originally operated from the terminal building at Jersey Airport and moved to its purpose built FBO in 1995. Since that time the premises have been extended and upgraded considerably, with a suite of rental offices (Heron House) and a new state of the art executive passenger lounge, the design of which was highly commended by the AJADA. The standard and range of facilities and services on offer resulted in Aviation Beauport being named as one of Europe's top FBOs. In 2002 the decision was made to concentrate operations on the jet market and for many years the company owned and operated Cessna Citation Excels. In 2009 the company extended its operations by acquiring its Dassault Falcon 2000LX and a worldwide AOC. In response to the needs of the Jersey market, a Cessna Citation Mustang was added to the fleet shortly afterwards.

In January 2016 Gama Aviation plc, one of the world's largest business aviation service providers, announced a conditional acquisition of Aviation Beauport Ltd. The conditional acquisition was approved on 16 February by the Channel Island's Competition Authority [CICRA].
