= Walkersteel =

British company

- Type: Private
- Industry: Steel processing and distribution
- Headquarters: Church, Lancashire, Lancashire, England
- Key people: Jack Walker
- Website: www.walkersteel.com

Walkersteel is a major steel processing company based in Church, Hyndburn, Lancashire. The firm was originally established by Charles Walker before his son Jack Walker turned the business into a major company.

== Revenue ==
The company was sold to British Steel plc in 1989 for a fee in excess of £300 million - which helped fund Jack Walker's takeover of Blackburn Rovers in early 1991. By this time, the steel company was achieving profits worth close to £50 million a year, though the onset of the recession saw the steel market suffer a major slump.

== Revival ==
The brand was revived in 1999, by Jack Walker’s son Howard Walker and his partner Graham Walsh. The business was then shortly after owned and controlled by the Walker Trust. However, in 2015, it was then acquired by James Dodgeon and Harry Pilkington, who have been its owners and operators ever since.
