= Millener =

Millener is a surname. Notable people with the surname include:

- John Millener (born 1944), New Zealand physicist and cricketer
- Richard Millener (born 1984), British rally manager

== See also ==
- Milliner
- Milliner (surname)
- Millner (disambiguation)
- Milner (disambiguation)
