= Stobart Motorsport =

Stobart Motorsport is an offshoot of the Eddie Stobart Group. Under its title sponsorship, Stobart Motorsport supports various rallie and motorbikey teams.

== VK M-Sport Ford Rally Team ==
The Stobart VK M-Sport Ford Rally Team is a rally team competing in the World Rally Championship. The team's principal is Malcolm Wilson, whose M-Sport operation runs Stobart as well as the Ford factory team and Munchi's Ford World Rally Team. The team competed under the Stobart banner from 2006 - 2012, when support was withdrawn.

== Gallery ==
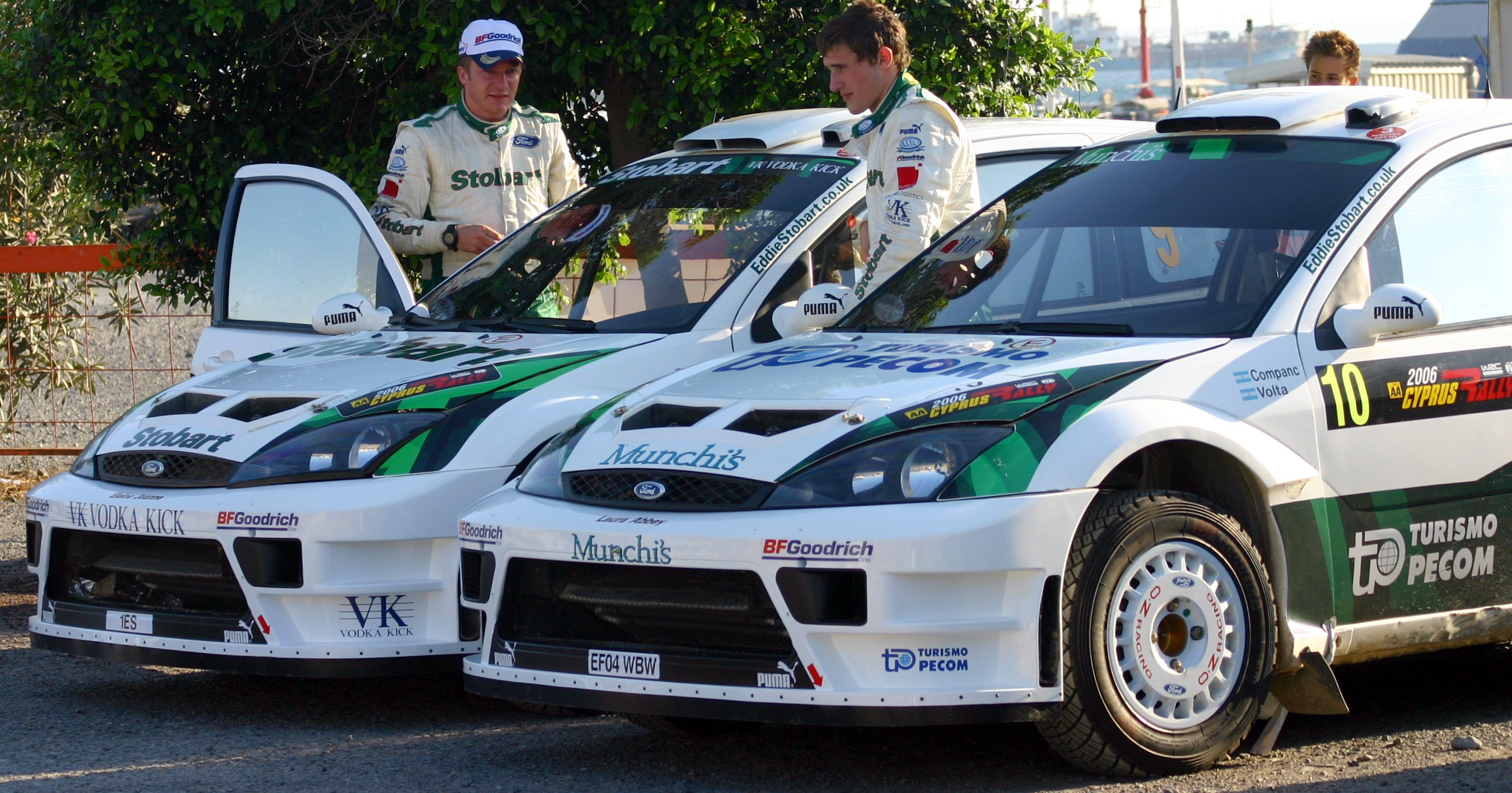
Stobart cars at 2006 Cyprus Rally

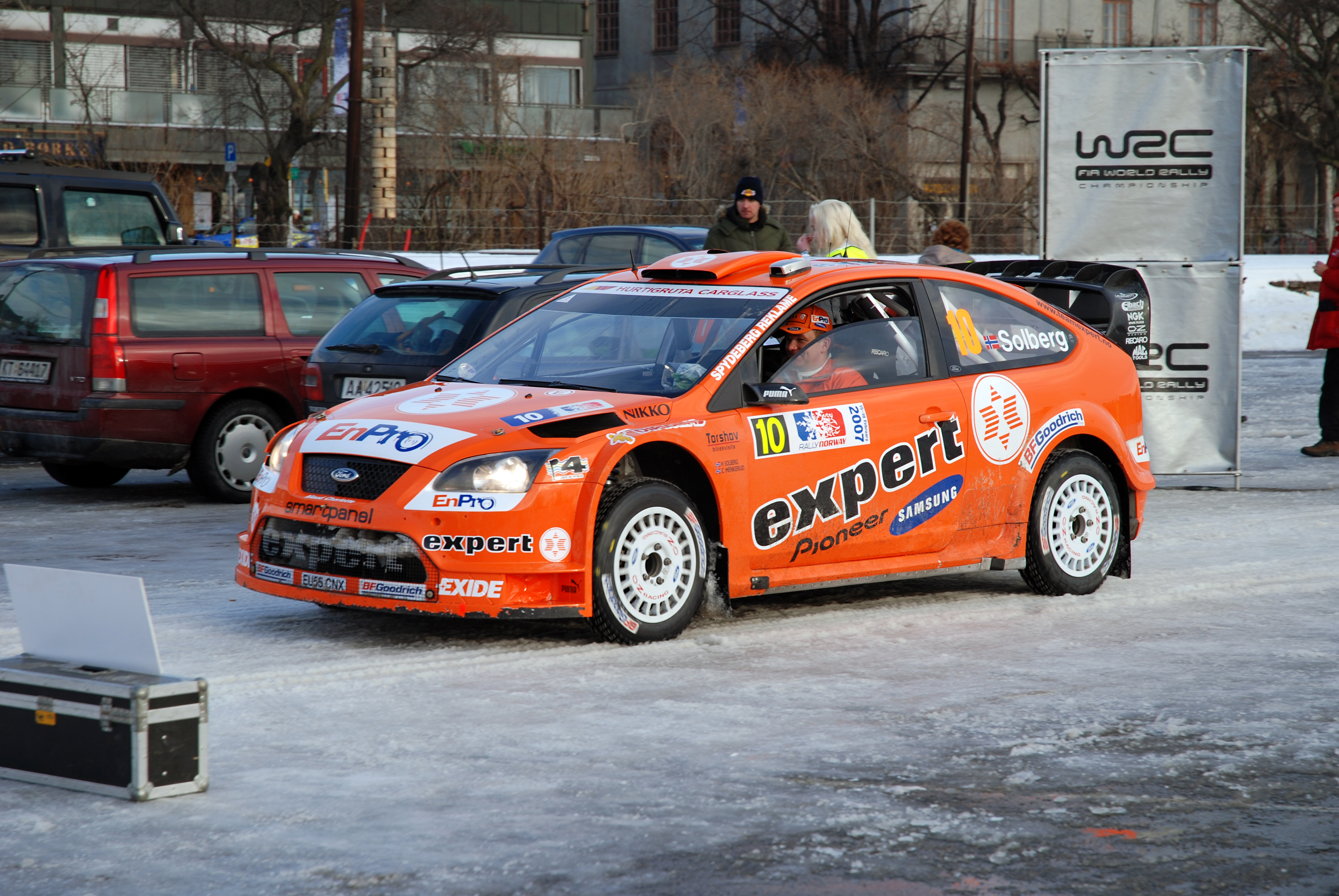
Henning Solberg in 2007

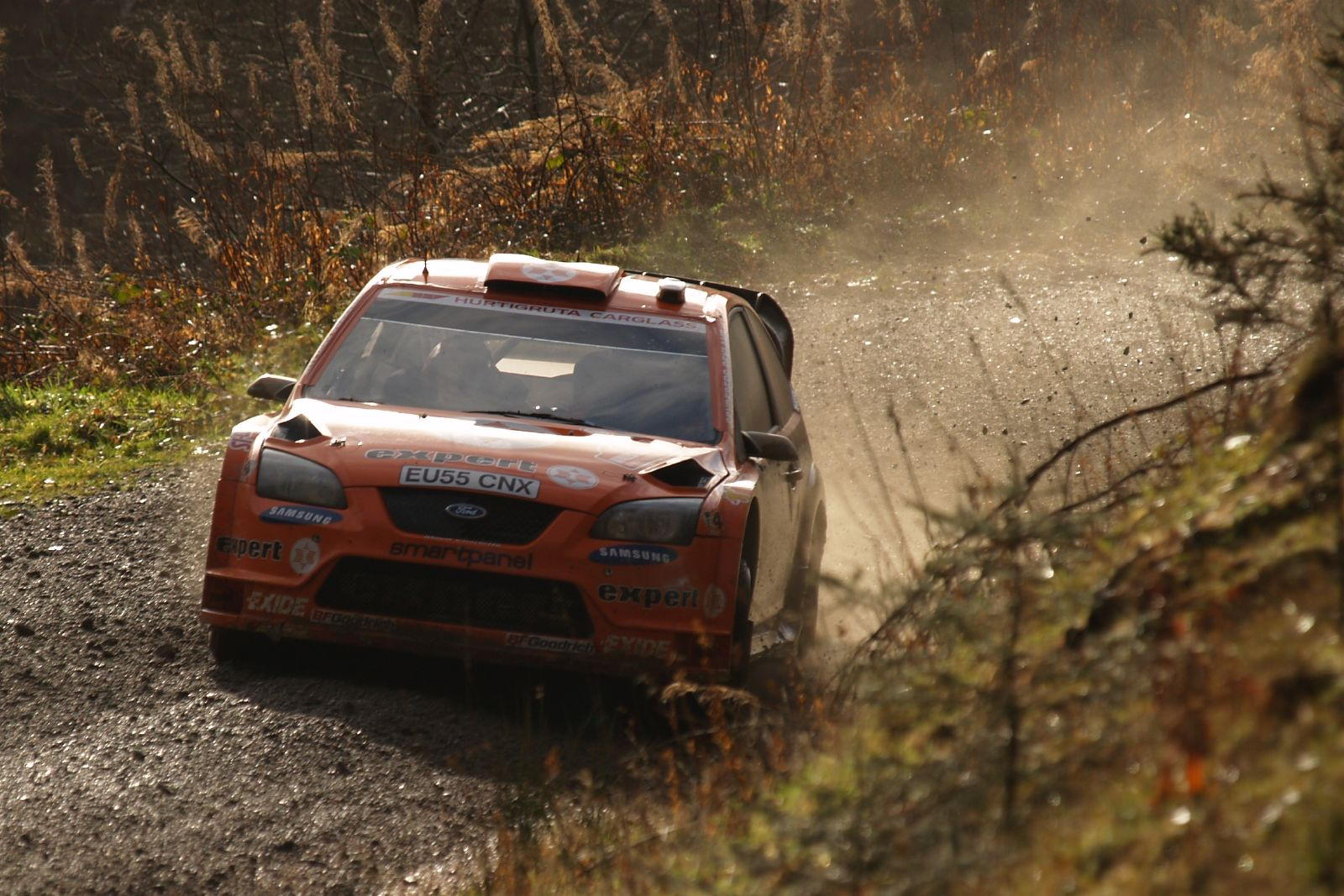
Henning Solberg in 2007

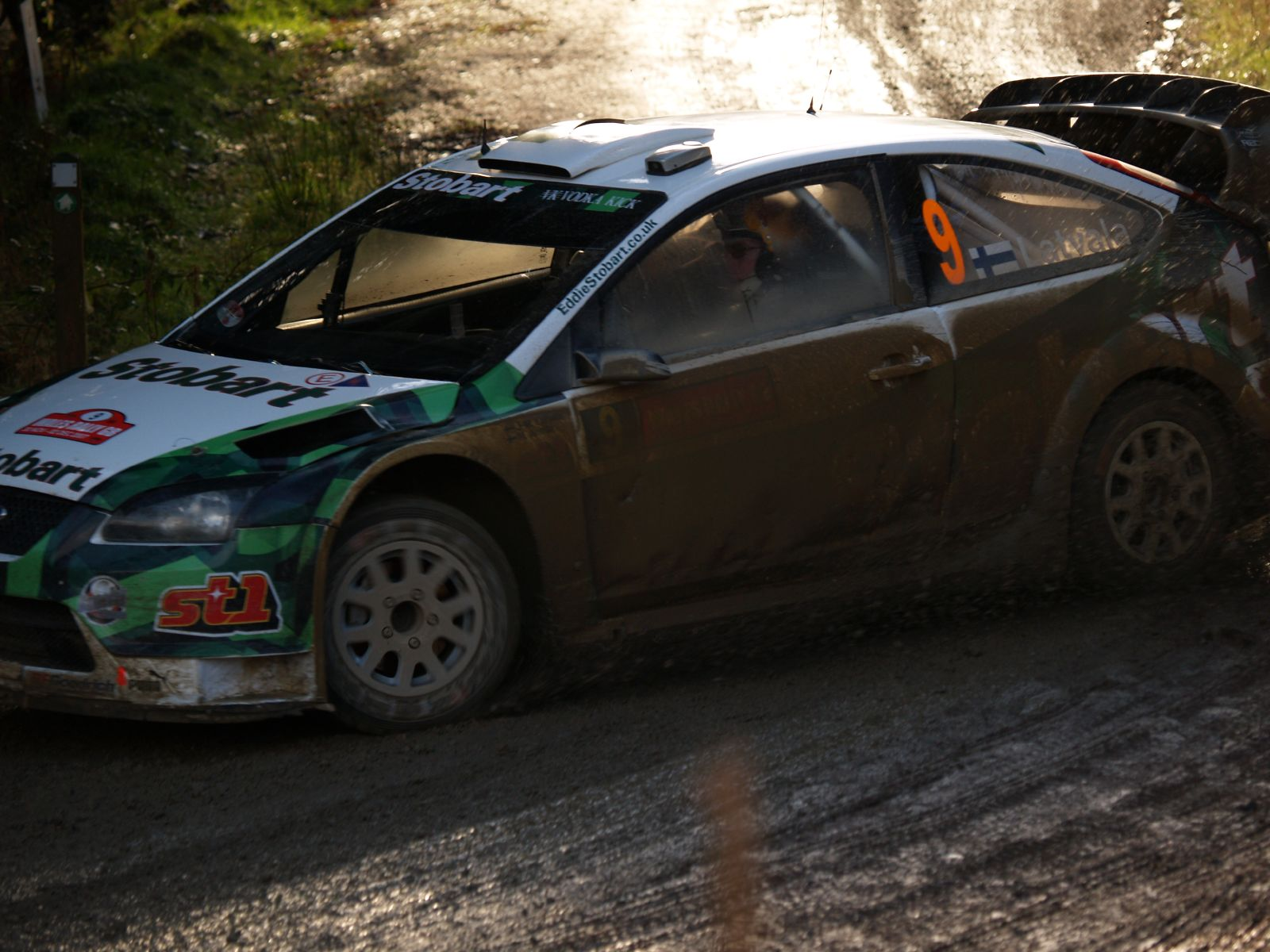
Jari-Matti Latvala at the 2007 Rally GB

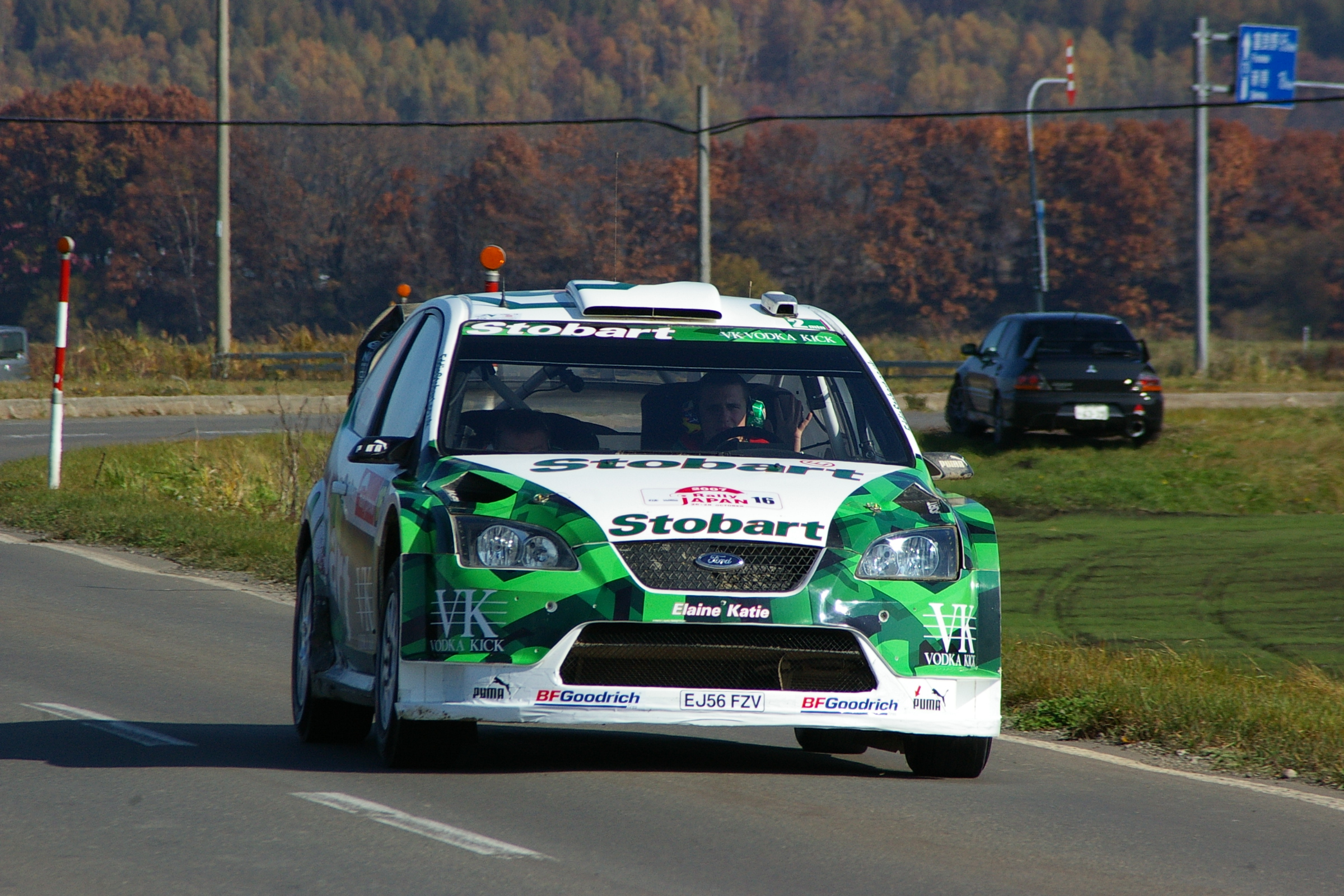
Matthew Wilson

== See also ==
- Stobart M-Sport Ford Rally Team
