= M-Sport World Rally Team =

World Rally Championship team

M-Sport Ford WRT
- Full name: M-Sport Ford World Rally Team
- Base: (United Kingdom) Cumbria, Great Britain
- Team principal(s): Richard Millener
- Drivers: (Republic of Ireland) Jon Armstrong (Republic of Ireland) Josh McErlean
- Co-drivers: (Republic of Ireland) Shane Byrne (Republic of Ireland) Eoin Treacy
- Chassis: Ford Puma Rally1
- Tyres: Hankook

World Rally Championship history
- Debut: 2006 Monte Carlo Rally
- Manufacturers' Championships: 1 (2017)
- Drivers' Championships: 2 (2017, 2018)
- Rally wins: 12

The M-Sport Ford World Rally Team (formerly "M-Sport World Rally Team", "Qatar M-Sport World Rally Team", and "Stobart M-Sport Ford Rally Team") is the privately run World Rally Championship team of M-Sport, the firm run by Malcolm Wilson that was previously responsible for the operation of the Ford World Rally Team.

== History ==
=== 2006 season ===
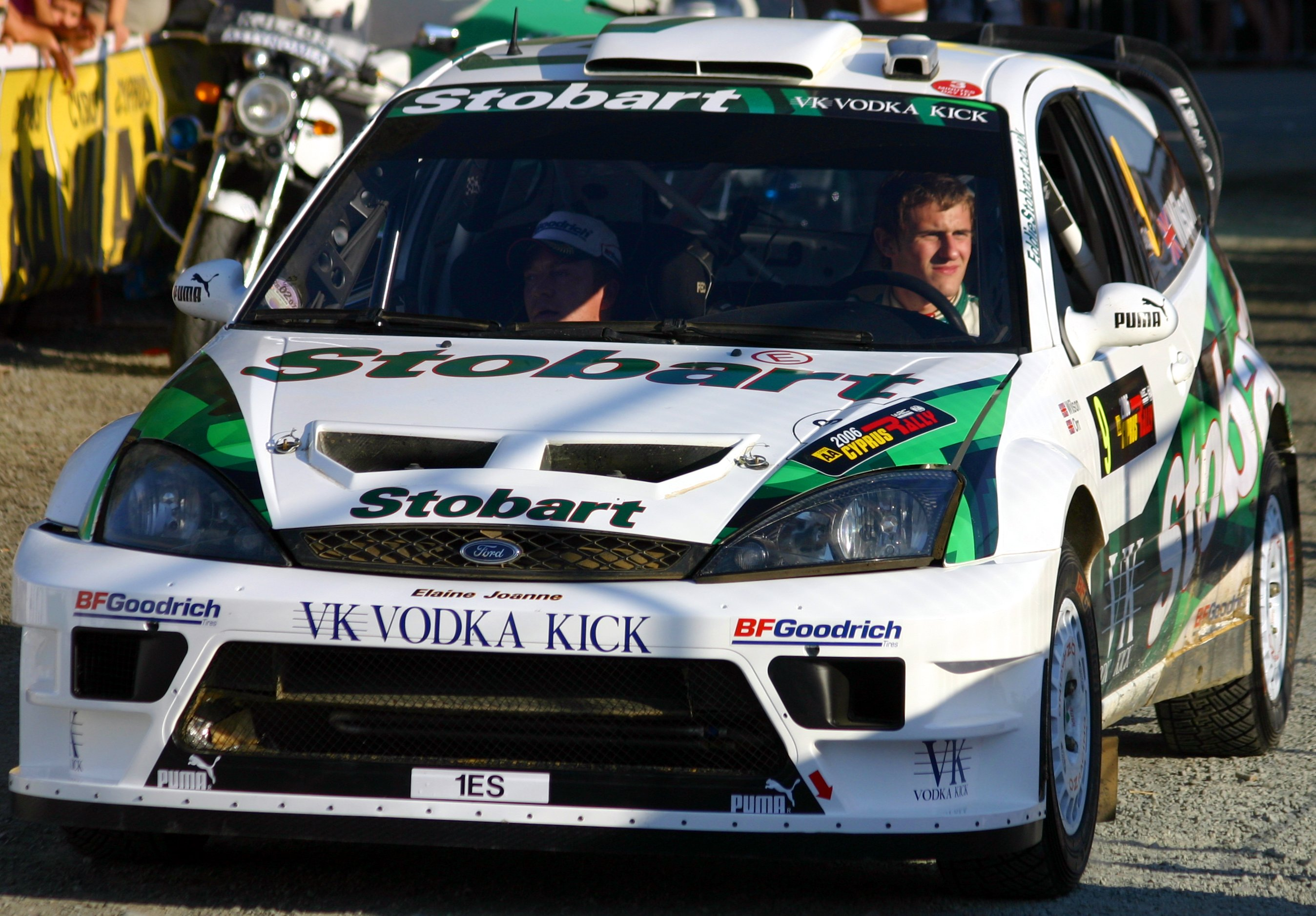
Wilson at the 2006 Cyprus Rally. Note that the car is named Elaine Joanne, following sponsor Stobart Group's tradition of giving its lorries female names.

Stobart debuted at the 2006 season opener Monte Carlo Rally with drivers Matthew Wilson and Pieter Tsjoen. Wilson went on to compete all the 16 rounds for the team. Other Stobart entrants during the season were Luís Pérez Companc in eight rallies, Kosti Katajamäki in five, Jari-Matti Latvala in four, Juan Pablo Raies at the Cyprus Rally and Andreas Mikkelsen at the Wales Rally GB.

The team's best results were Latvala's fourth place at the Wales Rally GB and Katajamäki's fifth at the Rally of Turkey and sixth at the Swedish Rally. With 44 points the team placed fifth overall in the manufacturers' world championship, behind OMV Peugeot Norway and ahead of Red Bull Škoda.

=== 2007 season ===
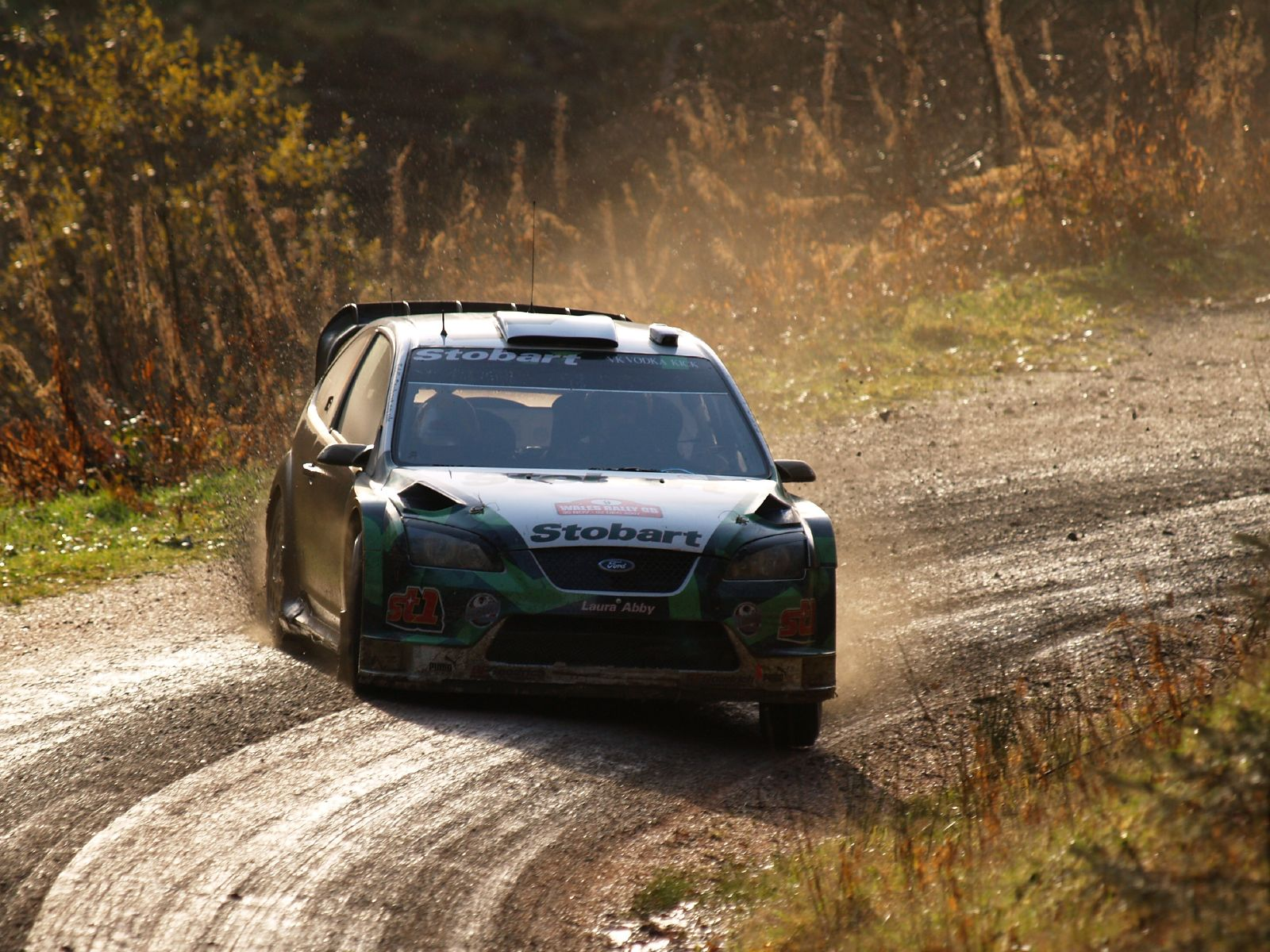
Latvala at the 2007 Rally GB.

In the 2007 season, Latvala and Wilson were joined by Henning Solberg and the three competed in all 16 rounds. Latvala and Solberg were nominated to collect manufacturers' championship points. Mikkelsen and Gareth Jones also drove for Stobart, in three and five events, respectively.

The team achieved its best points total at the Rally Norway, when Solberg took Stobart's first podium place by finishing third and Latvala finished fifth. Solberg later placed third at the Rally Japan and Latvala in the next rally in Ireland, whilst Wilson finished a season best fourth in Japan. Stobart fought with the Subaru World Rally Team for third place in the manufacturers' championship all year long, but Latvala's technical problems at the season-ending 2007 Wales Rally GB meant that the team had to settle for fourth place and 81 points. The team scored points in every event, and Latvala also led three rallies during the season; Rally d'Italia Sardegna, Rally Finland and Rally Japan.

=== 2008 season ===
For the 2008 season, Latvala was promoted to the BP Ford World Rally Team and replaced in the Stobart team by Gigi Galli. Wilson and Solberg continued with the team and along with Galli are signed to compete in all 15 events with the Ford Focus RS WRC 07. For some events, Solberg's car was entered by the sister Munchi's Ford World Rally Team. At the season opener, the 2008 Monte Carlo Rally, the team's fastest driver was François Duval, driving a fourth Stobart car, who finished in fourth place. Galli finished third at the Swedish Rally. Duval returned to the team for Rallye Deutschland, and finished third, as the leading Ford driver. On this rally, Galli suffered an injury in a crash that kept him out of action for the rest of the season. Duval replaced him in the team on the next rally in New Zealand. The factory Ford team decided to swap their driver Latvala with Duval for the two tarmac rallies of Catalunya and Corsica, in order to help them to secure the manufacturers' crown. The two drivers returned to their teams for the final two rounds, while Stobart also ran Valentino Rossi on Wales Rally GB.

=== 2009 season ===
Solberg and Wilson were joined at the team for the start of the 2009 season by Urmo Aava. However, he left the team after two rounds. Solberg scored third-placed finishes in Argentina and Poland. The team were joined in Poland by Krzysztof Hołowczyc, who finished the rally in sixth place. British privateer and founder of team sponsor Vodka Kick Steve Perez was entered by the team on Rally GB. The team finished third in the manufacturers' standings behind the Ford and Citroën factory teams. Solberg and Wilson finished sixth and seventh in the drivers' standings respectively.

=== 2010 season ===
Wilson and Solberg remained with the team again for 2010. For the opening Rally Sweden, Finnish entrepreneur Mattias Therman paid for Stobart to run an additional two cars on the rally for himself and retired former world champion Marcus Grönholm. Gronholm showed great speed but endured many issues during the rally and could only finish in 21st place. During the season several other drivers drove alongside the regular drivers Solberg and Wilson – Per-Gunnar Andersson in Bulgaria, Duval in Germany, Juha Kankkunen in Finland, Ken Block in France and Spain and Liu Chao Dong in Wales. In various races Solberg, Dennis Kuipers and Mads Østberg drove the new Ford Fiesta S2000. Again the team finished third in the manufacturers' standings.

=== 2011 season ===
Willson and Solberg were retained in 2011 with Mads Østberg and Evgeny Novikov joining the team. The best finishes were two second places in Sweden and Wales which marked the teams best finishes by then. Like in the previous seasons the team finished third behind the works entries of Ford and Citroën.

=== 2012 season ===
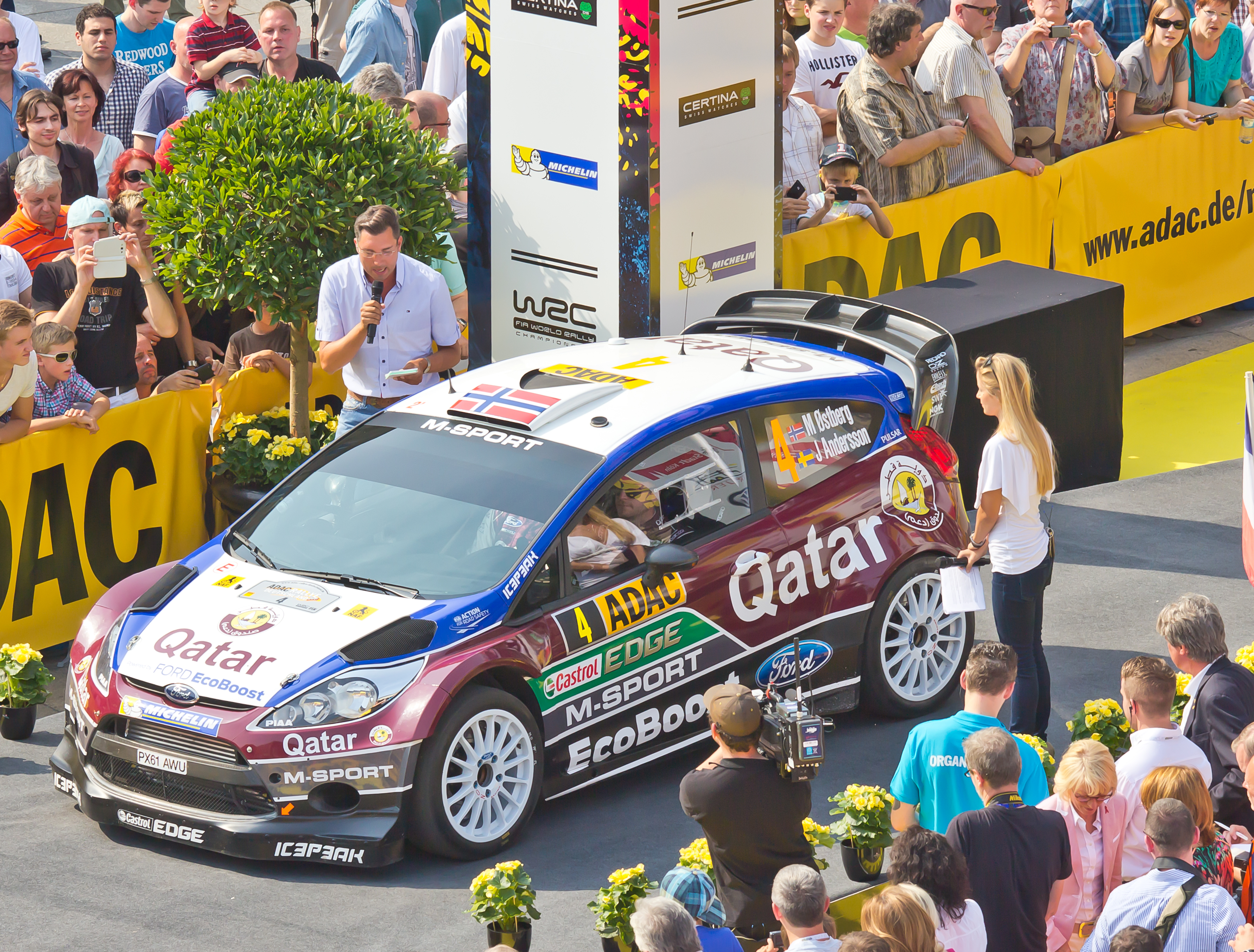
Mads Østberg at the 2013 Rallye Deutschland.

Stobart's support was withdrawn in 2012 and the team was rebranded as M-Sport Ford World Rally Team. Novikov remained with the team and was joined by Ott Tänak, while Østberg, Willson and Solberg left.

=== 2013 season ===
With Ford no longer having works entry, the M-Sport World Rally Team acquired sponsorship from Qatar via Nasser Al-Attiyah. The Qatar M-Sport World Rally Team became the de facto Ford lead team, with returning Mads Østberg and Evgeny Novikov. Meanwhile, a separate formation – Qatar World Rally Team was also supported by M-Sport, with drivers Al-Attiyah and Thierry Neuville. The team also fielded Ford Fiesta R5 for the 2012 WRC Academy champion Elfyn Evans in the WRC-2. Neuville finished the season as runner-up, long way behind Sebastien Ogier, while the team finished third in the team standings.

=== 2014 season ===
The Qatar's sponsorship ended after the end of the 2013 season. Mikko Hirvonen and Elfyn Evans were nominated for points for the team, while a separate entry would be formed for Robert Kubica – RK M-Sport World Rally Team. Both teams have scored points separately from one another. Hirvonen finished his last season in WRC in fourth place with 126 points, exactly the same amount he scored in 2013, while Evans's debut season ended in seventh place. The team again finished third in the team standings, but this time, ahead of the revived Hyundai team.

=== 2015 season ===
Elfyn Evans remained in the team, while Ott Tänak returned to M-Sport, replacing Hirvonen. The team scored three podium finishes and dropped back to fourth place behind Hyundai.

=== 2016 season ===
Tänak went to DMACK WRT and Evans competed in WRC2. Team of Mads Østberg and Eric Camilli ended the season in fourth place again.

=== 2017 season ===
For 2017, M-Sport hired Sébastien Ogier as lead driver. Ott Tänak returned to the team after contesting the 2016 season with DMACK World Rally Team. Elfyn Evans returned to the premier class after contesting the 2016 season in the WRC-2 category.

Ogier won the drivers' championship, claiming two wins and nine podiums. Tänak finished third with two wins and seven podiums. Evans won the Rally GB and finished second at Argentina and Finland, ranking fifth in points. The team won the manufacturers championship, collecting a podium at every round.

=== 2018 season ===
The team was named "M-Sport Ford World Rally Team" again after 2012, with increased factory support from Ford. Tänak left to Toyota and Suninen received an extended program. Ogier retained the title with four wins and two runner-up finishes, whereas Evans ranked seventh with two podiums. Suninen finished third at Portugal and was 12th in points.

=== 2019 season ===
Ogier left to join Citroën, while Suninen and Evans is teamed with Pontus Tidemand.

Malcolm Wilson stepped back from the team principal role, which was filled by Rich Millener.

=== 2021 season ===
M-Sport filled two Ford Fiesta WRC cars for the 2021 season. One of them would be driven by Gus Greensmith with a full-time drive, and the second car would be shared between Teemu Suninen and Adrien Fourmaux. However, Teemu Suninen parted ways with the team before Acropolis Rally Greece. As a consequence, Fourmaux would finish the season in the Fiesta.

In WRC-2, their line-up would be formed by Teemu Suninen, Adrien Forumaux, Martin Prokop and Tom Kristensson (Winner of 2020 Junior WRC).

=== 2022 season ===
As the hybrid cars arrived to WRC, Ford will increase their factory support to the team. The new car will be a Ford Puma Hybrid Rally1, in substitution of the Ford Fiesta WRC.

Craig Breen and Paul Nagle joined the team in a multi-year deal. Adrien Fourmaux and Alexandre Coria, along with Gus Greensmith and Jonas Andersson were also announced as factory drivers.

Former WRC-2 champions Pierre-Louis Loubet and Vincent Landais contested selected events in a fourth car. Jari Huttunen and Mikko Lukka represented the team in WRC-2.

Sébastien Loeb, the 9-time world champion, has tested the car several times and join the team for a part-time drive.

M-Sport started the season with Loeb and co-driver Isabelle Galmiche winning on Monte-Carlo, along with Breen and Nagle finishing in 3rd. The rest of the season was rather poor, with crews making a lot of mistakes and struggling with reliability issues. As a result, the only other podium was Breen and Nagle's 2nd place in Italy. In the overall classification, Breen only managed to finish 7th, even behind part-time contesting Sebastien Ogier. Greensmith and Fourmaux classified 10th and 16th, respectively.

Jari Huttunen and Mikko Lukka made their Rally1 debut in Finland and finished 9th following fuel pressure issues.

M-Sport sold one Puma Rally1 car to Greek privateer Jourdan Serderidis.

=== 2023 season ===
The team reduced the amount of their cars from 3 to 2, with the third car entered occasionally. 2022 runners-up Ott Tänak and Martin Järveoja returned to the team, while Pierre-Louis Loubet stepped up to drive the second car, teaming up with Thierry Neuville's former co-driver Nicolas Gilsoul. Greek privateer Jourdan Serderidis entered selected events like Monte-Carlo and Mexico.

Last year's factory crew Adrien Fourmaux and Alexandre Coria will represent M-Sport's WRC-2 team, joined by former Hyundai juniors Grégoire Munster and Louis Louka, as well as reigning WRC-3 Junior champion Robert Virves with new co-driver Hugo Magalhaes.

Craig Breen and new co-driver James Fulton left the team after just one year and returned to Hyundai. Gus Greensmith and Jonas Andersson also left the team and switched to WRC-2.

Tänak and Järveoja took M-Sport's first win since 2022 Rallye Monte Carlo on 2023 Rally Sweden.

== Results ==
=== Complete Dakar Rally results ===
Complete Dakar Rally results
Year	Car	Class	No.	Driver, Codriver	Position	Stages won
2024	Ford Ranger T1+	T1+	210	(Spain) Nani Roma (Spain) Alex Haro	44th	0
2024	Ford Ranger T1+	T1+	225	(South Africa) Gareth Woolridge (South Africa) Boyd Dreyer	46th	0
2025	Ford Raptor DKR	T1+	225	(Spain) Carlos Sainz (Spain) Lucas Cruz	DNF	0
2025	Ford Raptor DKR	T1+	226	(Sweden) Mattias Ekström (Sweden) Emil Bergkvist	3rd	1
2025	Ford Raptor DKR	T1+	227	(Spain) Nani Roma (Spain) Alex Haro	42nd	1
2025	Ford Raptor DKR	T1+	228	(United States) Mitch Guthrie (United States) Kellon Walch	5th	0

== Gallery ==
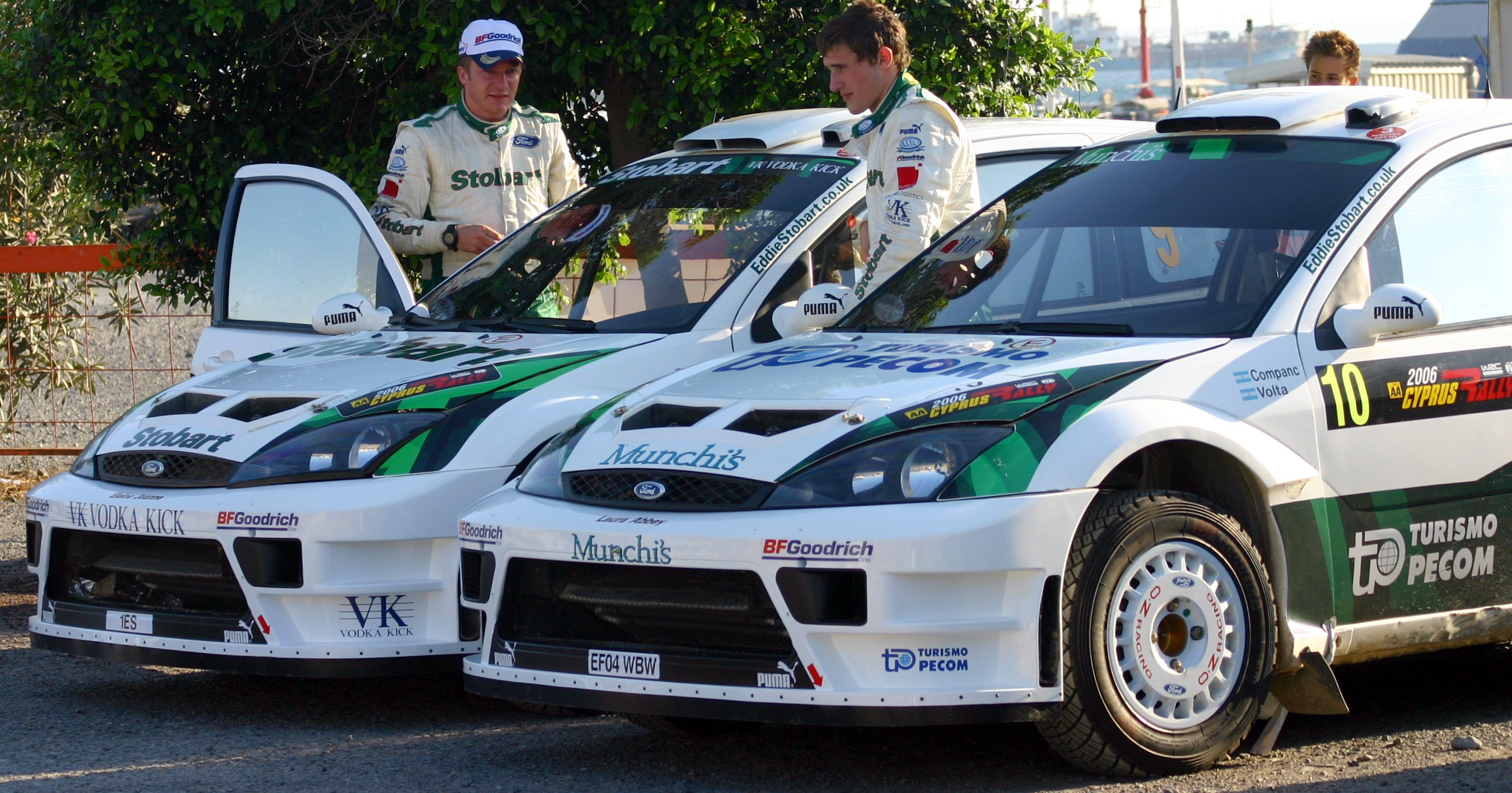
Stobart cars at 2006 Cyprus Rally

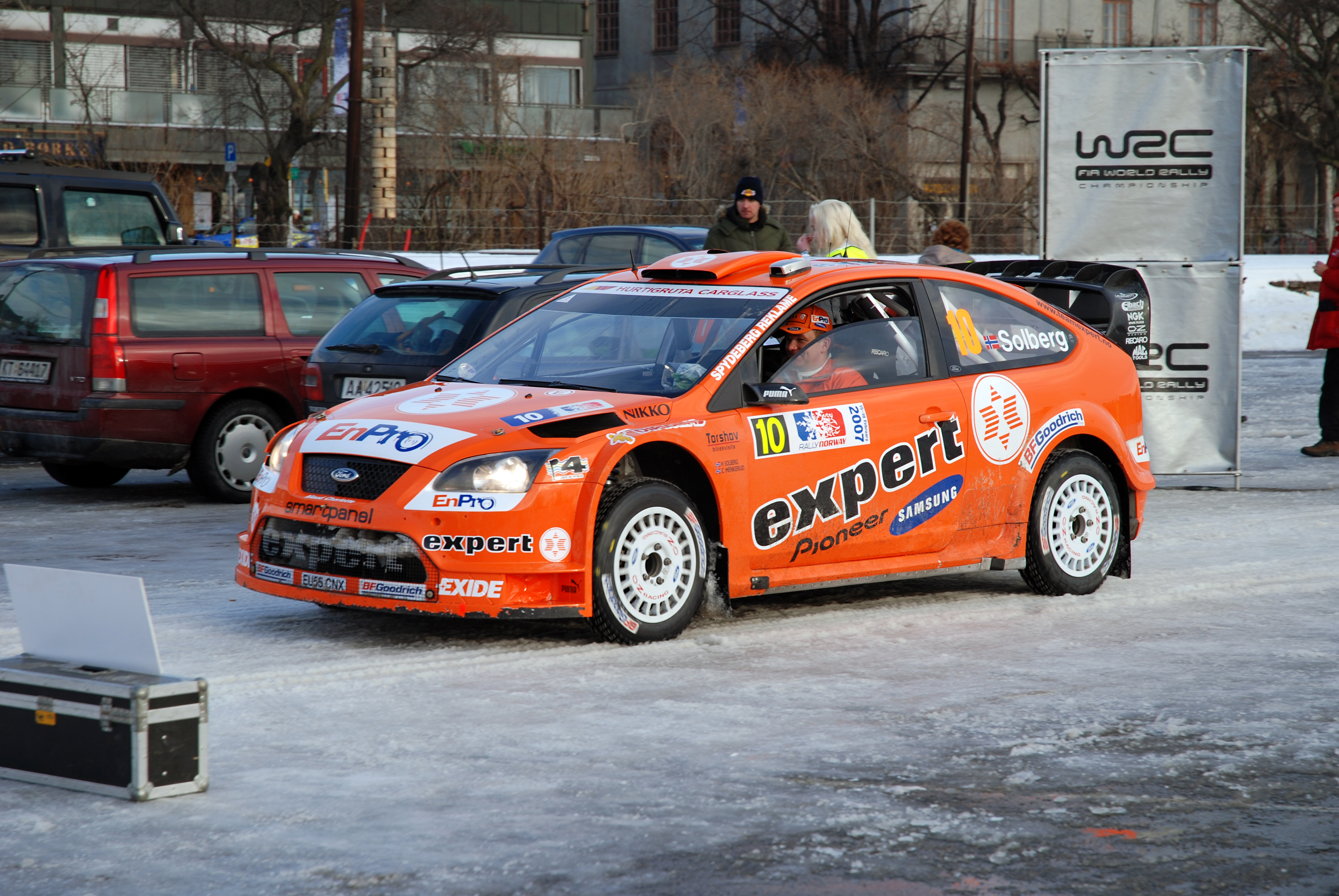
Henning Solberg in 2007

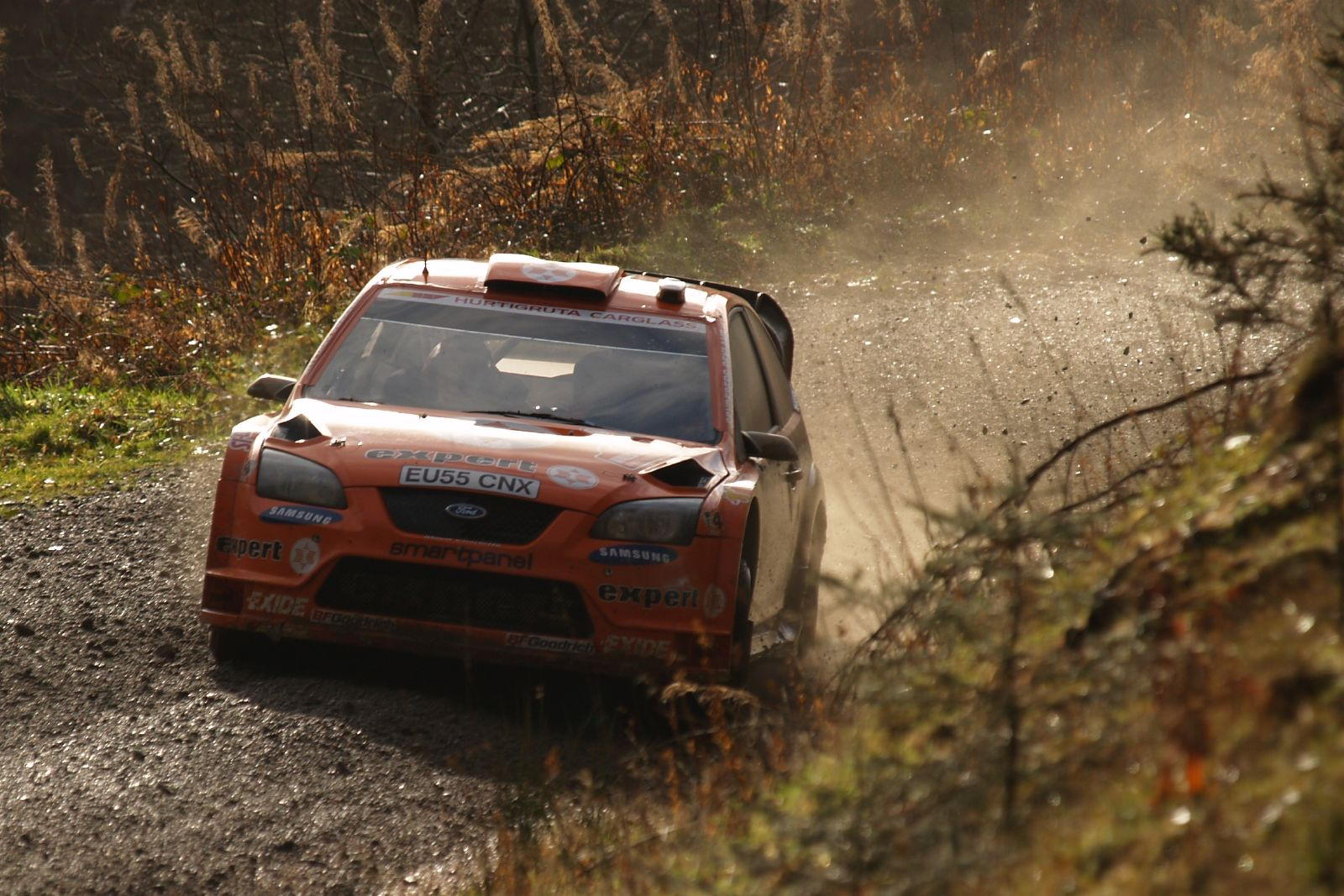
Henning Solberg in 2007

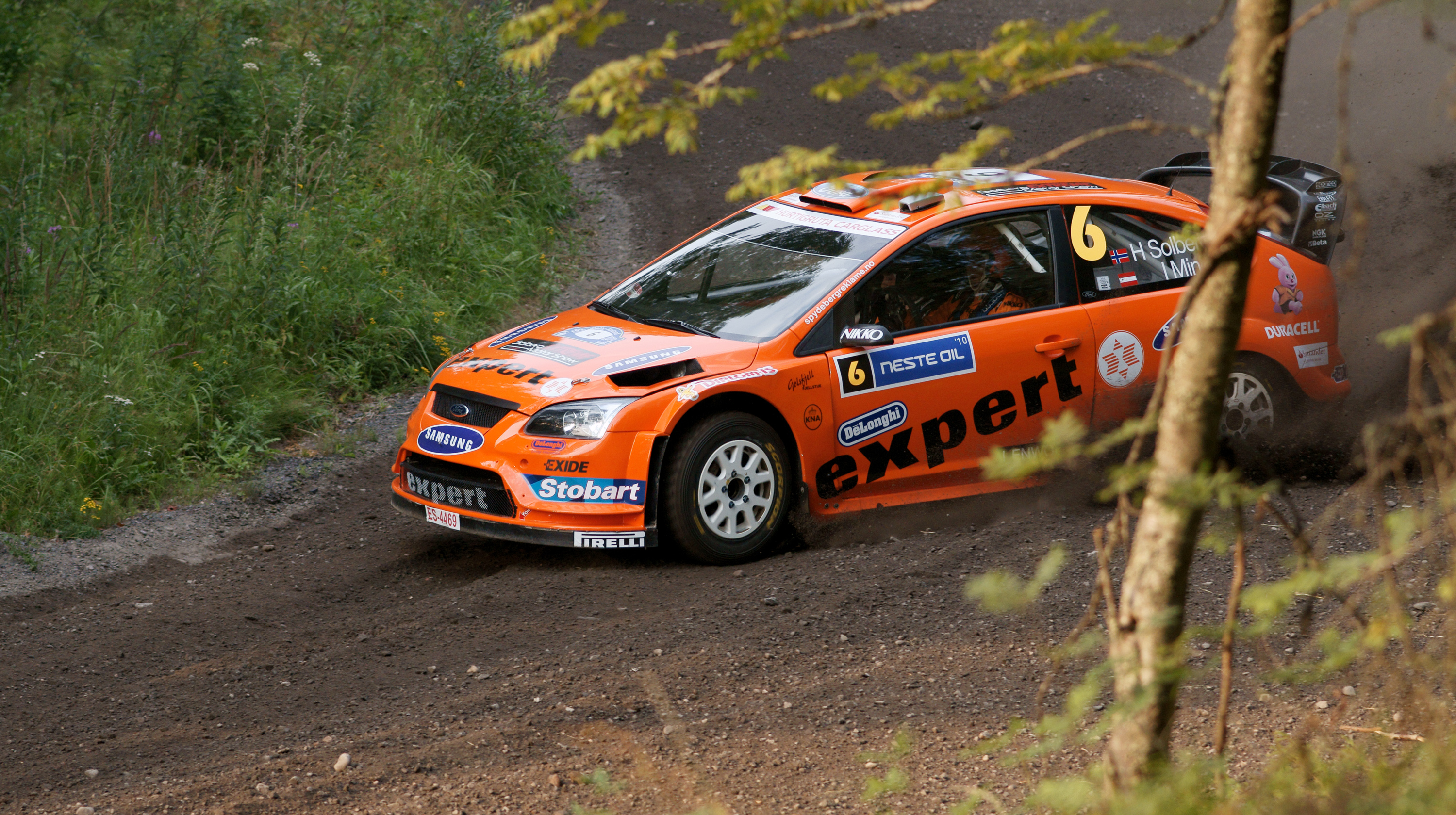
Henning Solberg at 2010 Rally Finland

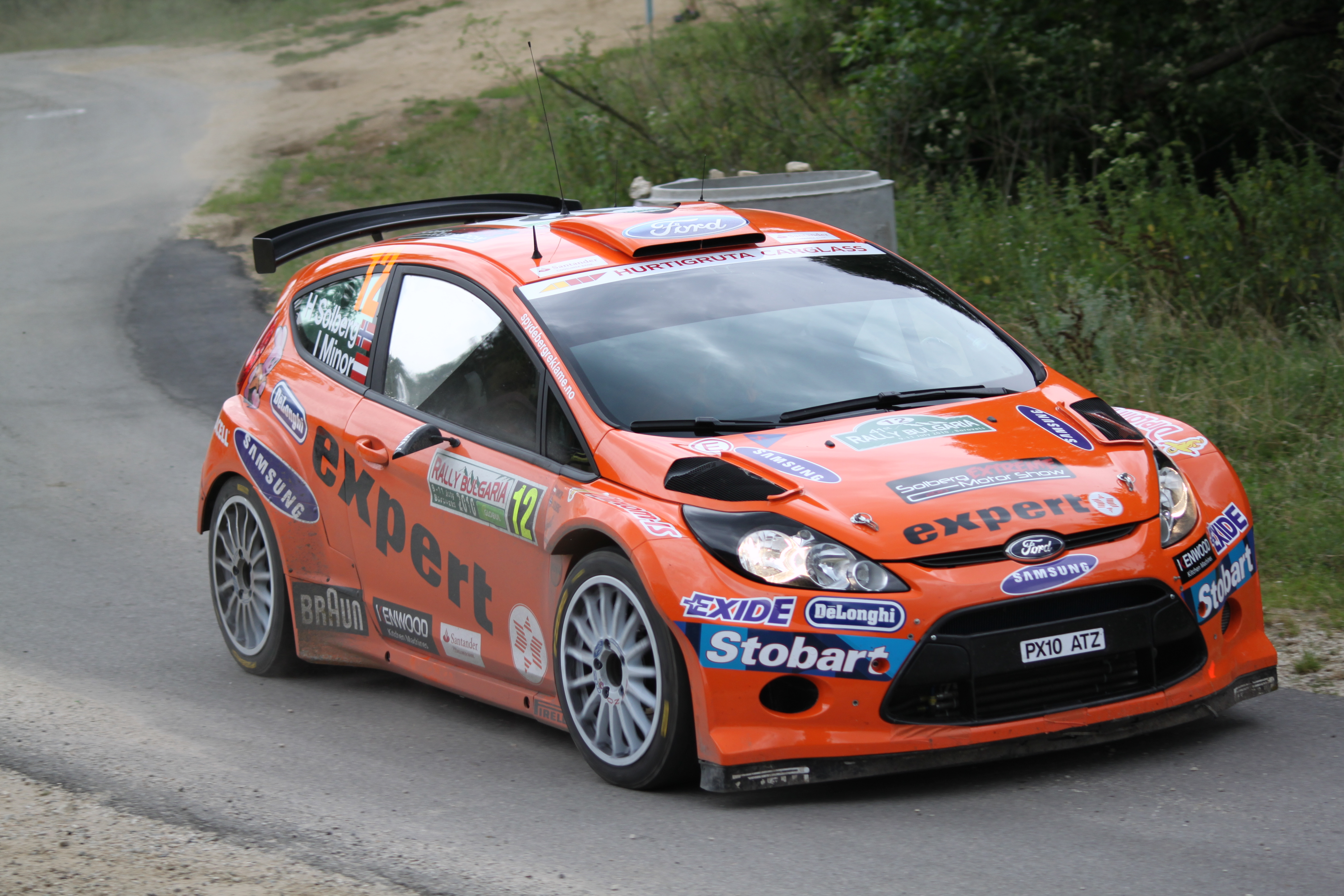
Henning Solberg with Ford Fiesta S2000 at 2010 Rally Bulgaria

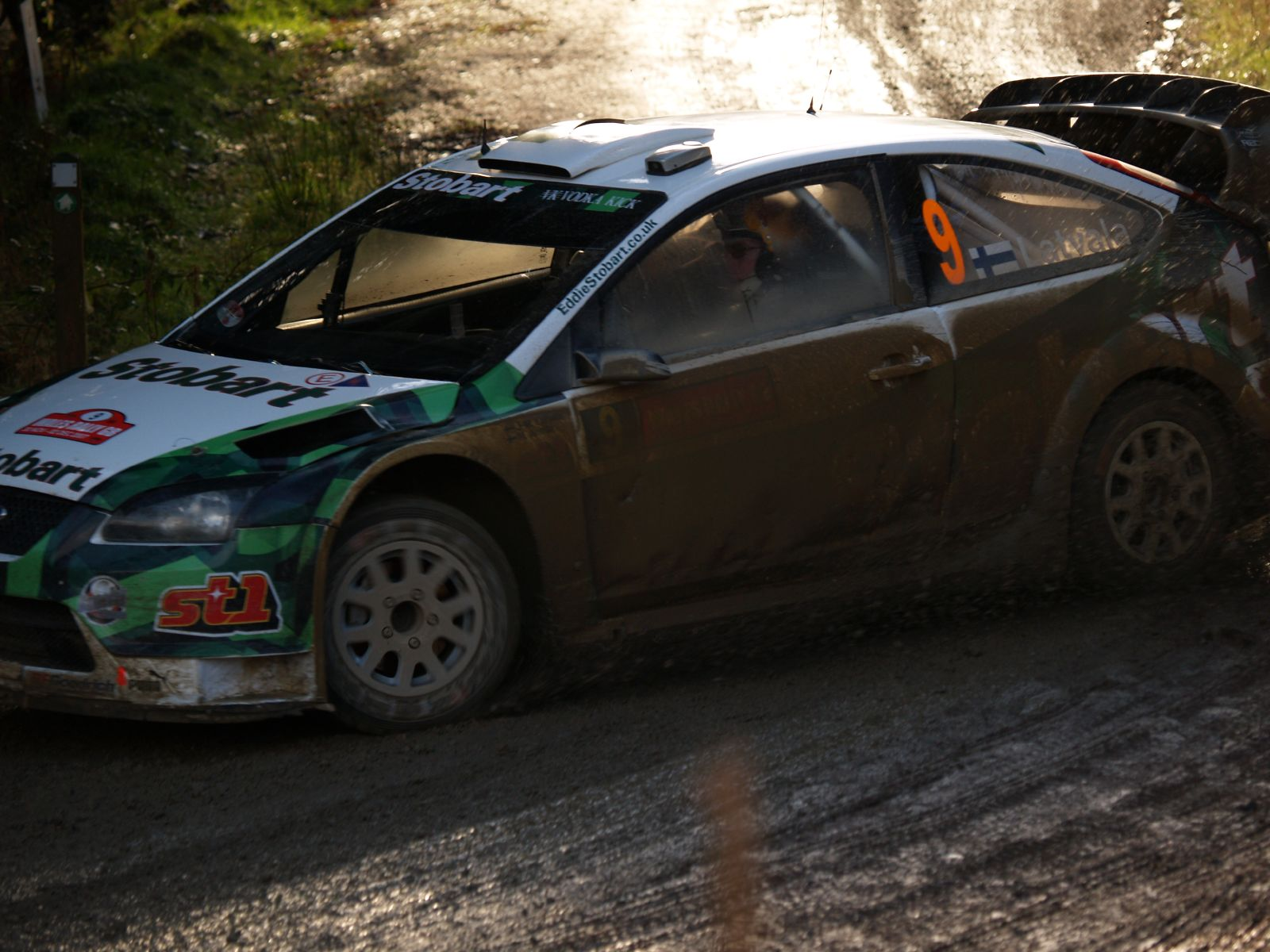
Jari-Matti Latvala at the 2007 Rally GB

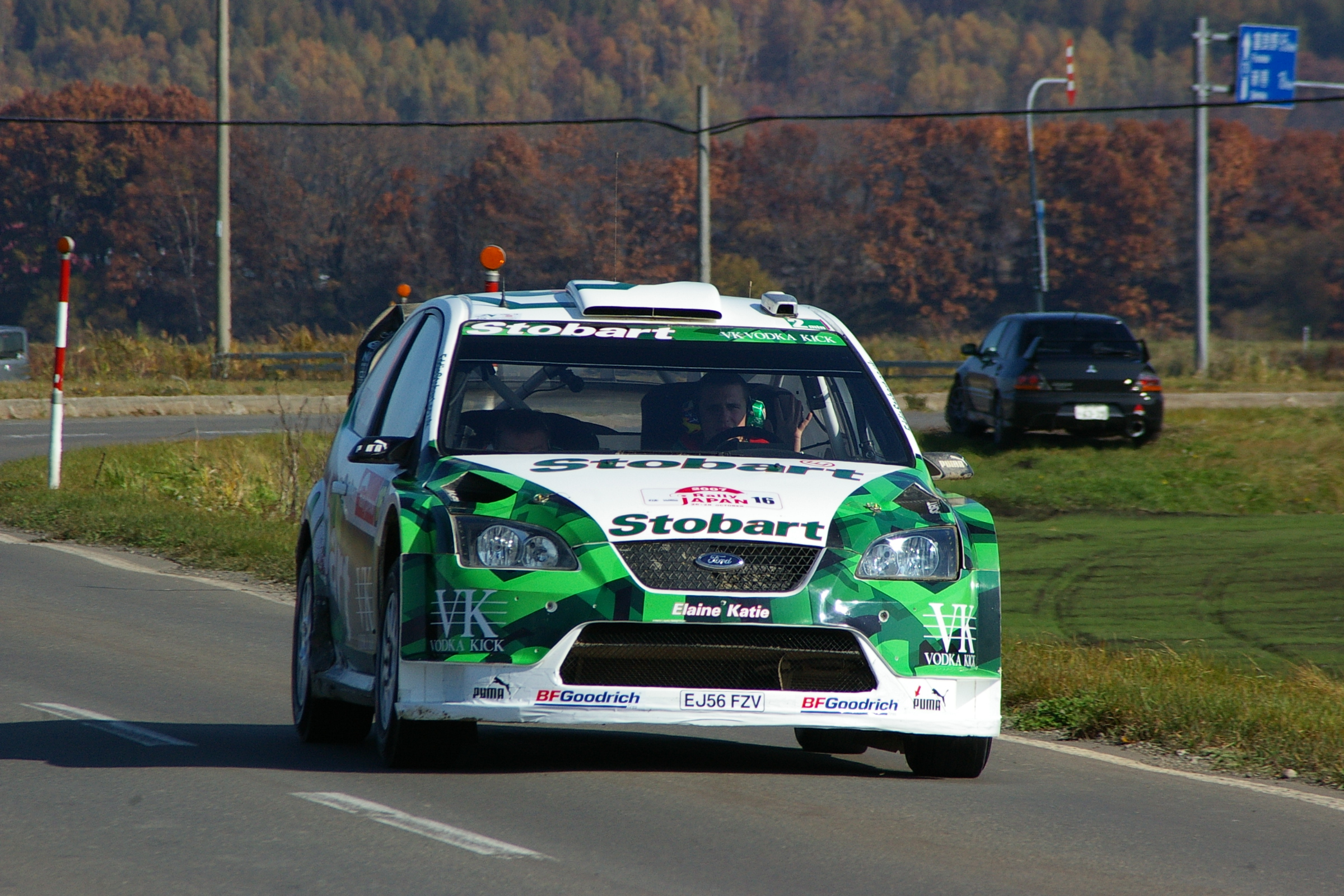
Matthew Wilson

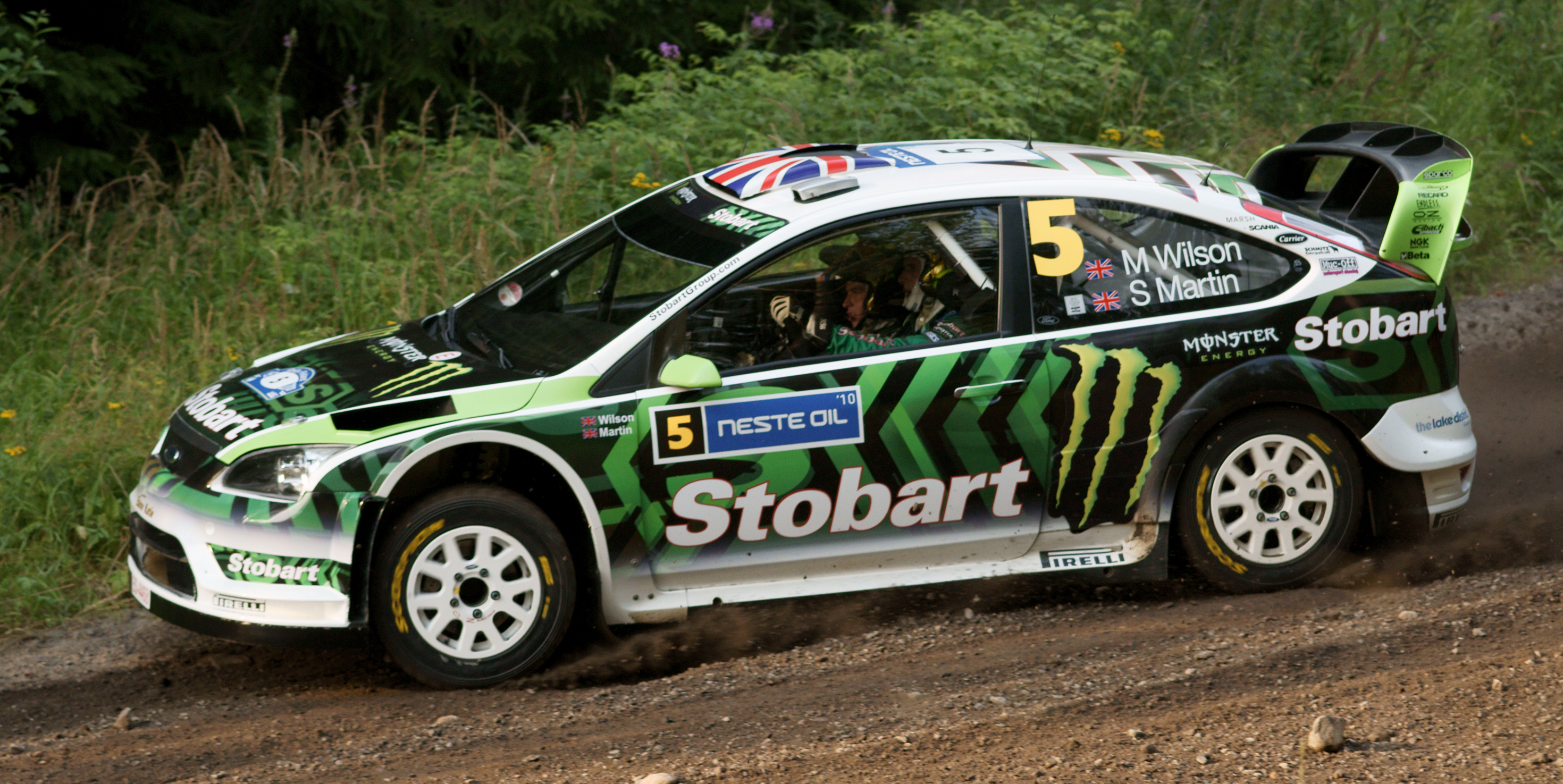
Matthew Wilson in 2010

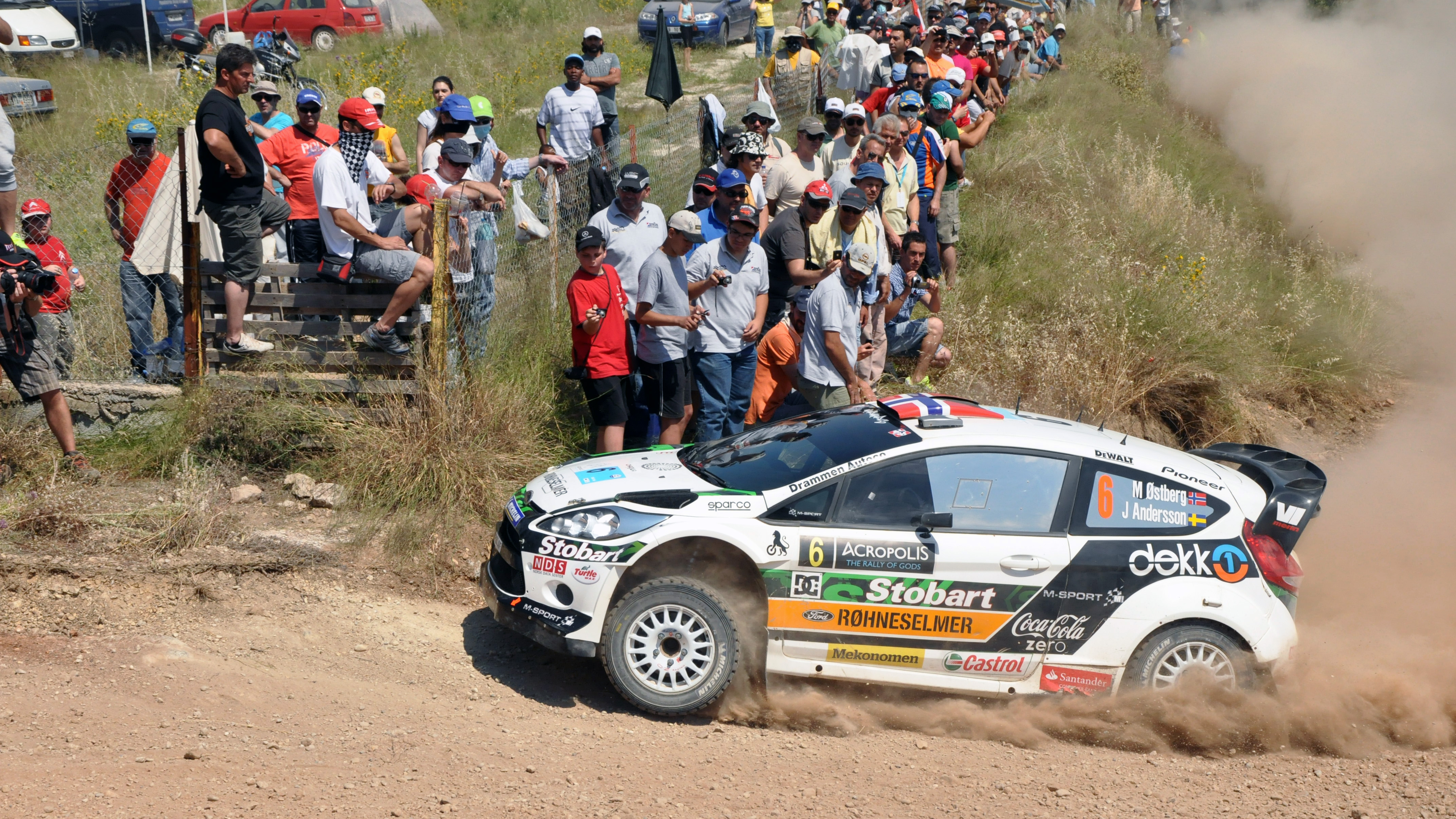
Mads Østberg at 2011 Acropolis Rally

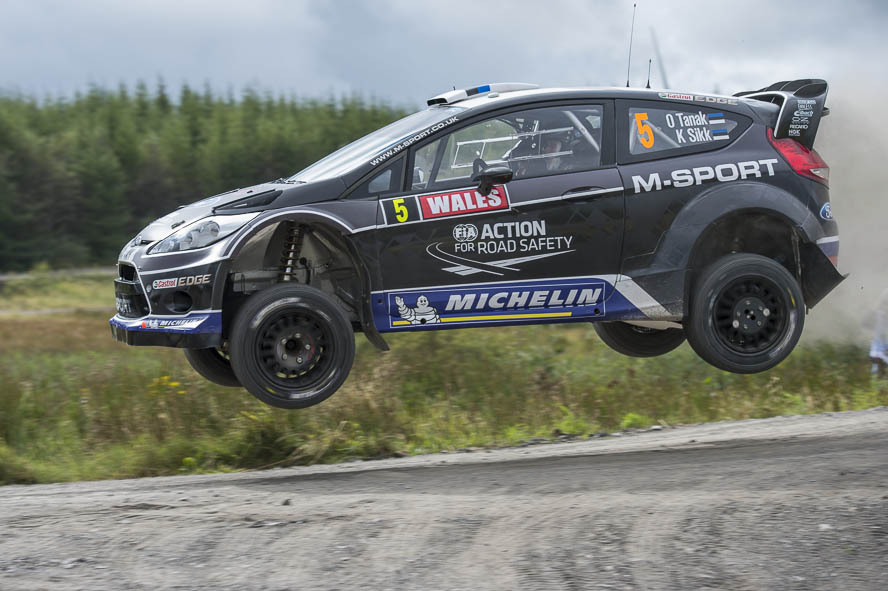
Ott Tänak at the 2012 Wales Rally GB

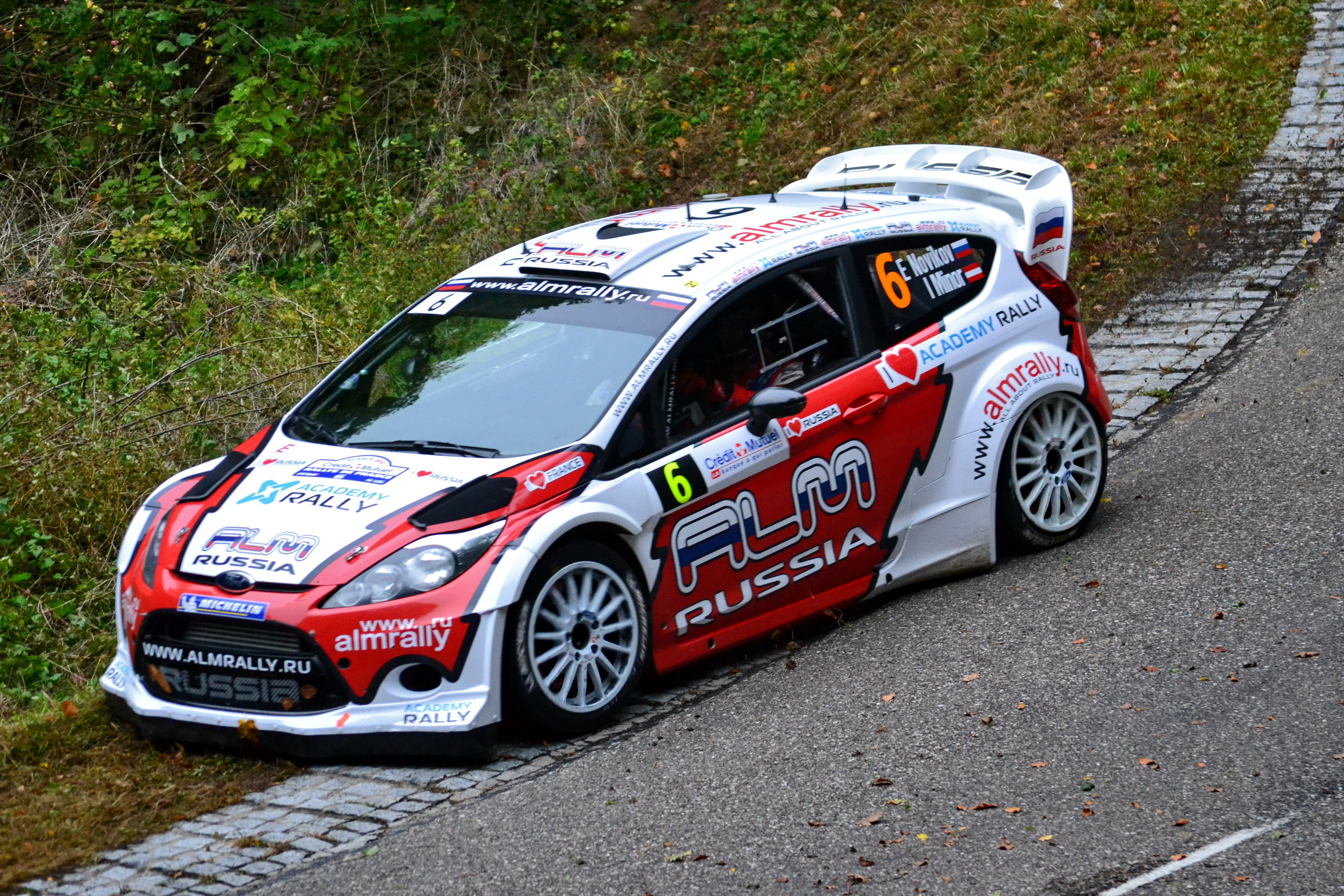
Evgeny Novikov in 2012

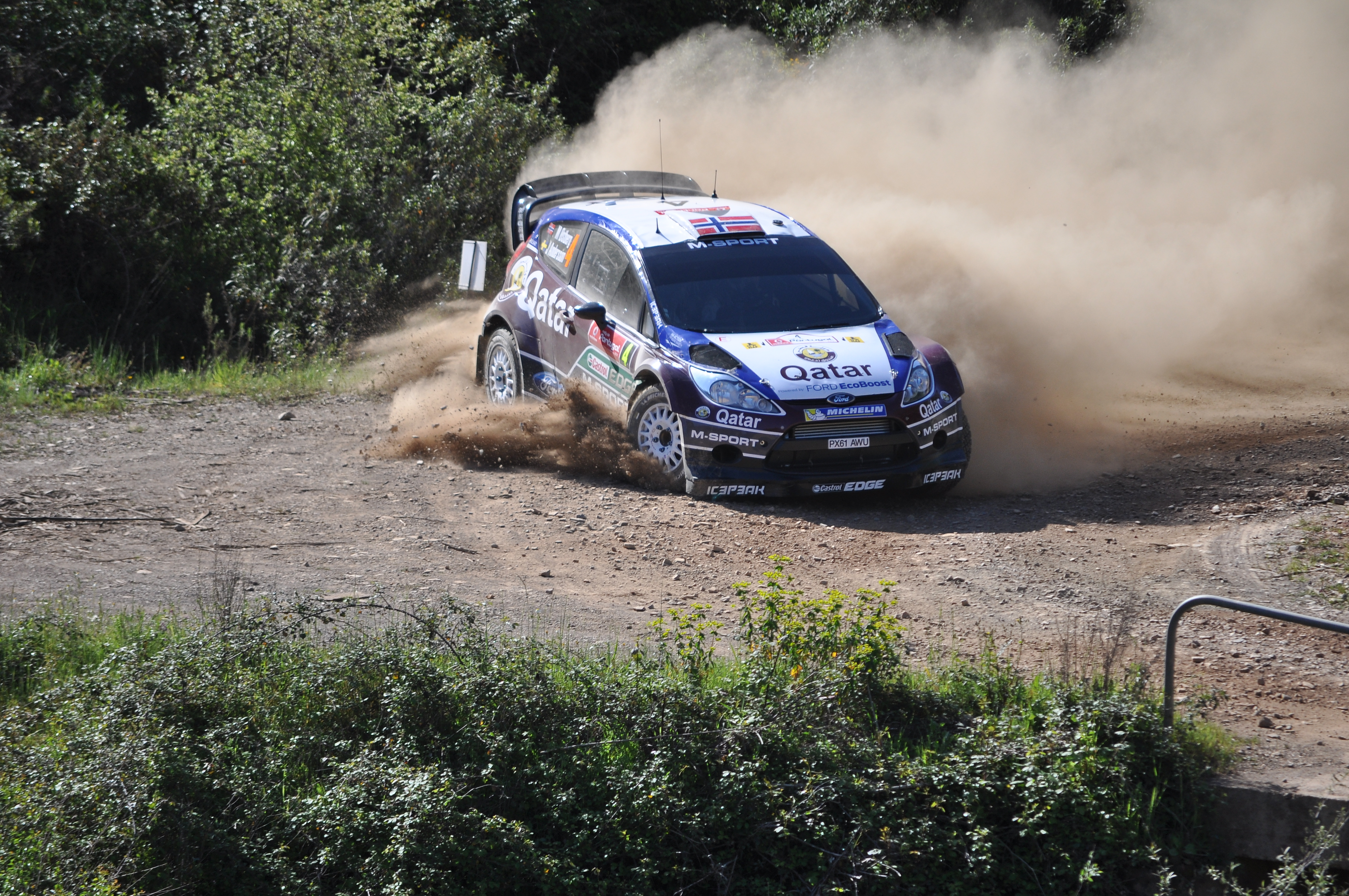
Mads Østberg at the 2013 Rally de Portugal

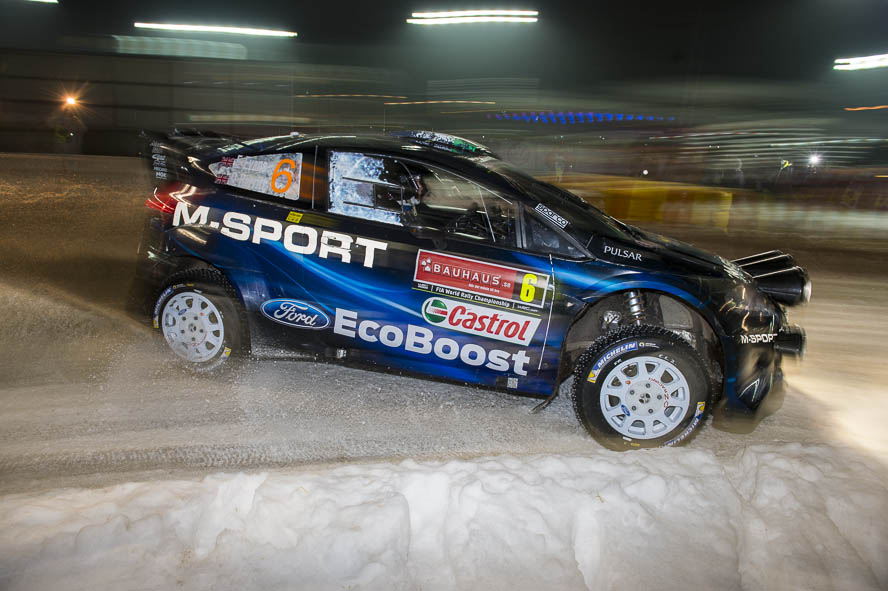
Elfyn Evans at the 2014 Rally Sweden

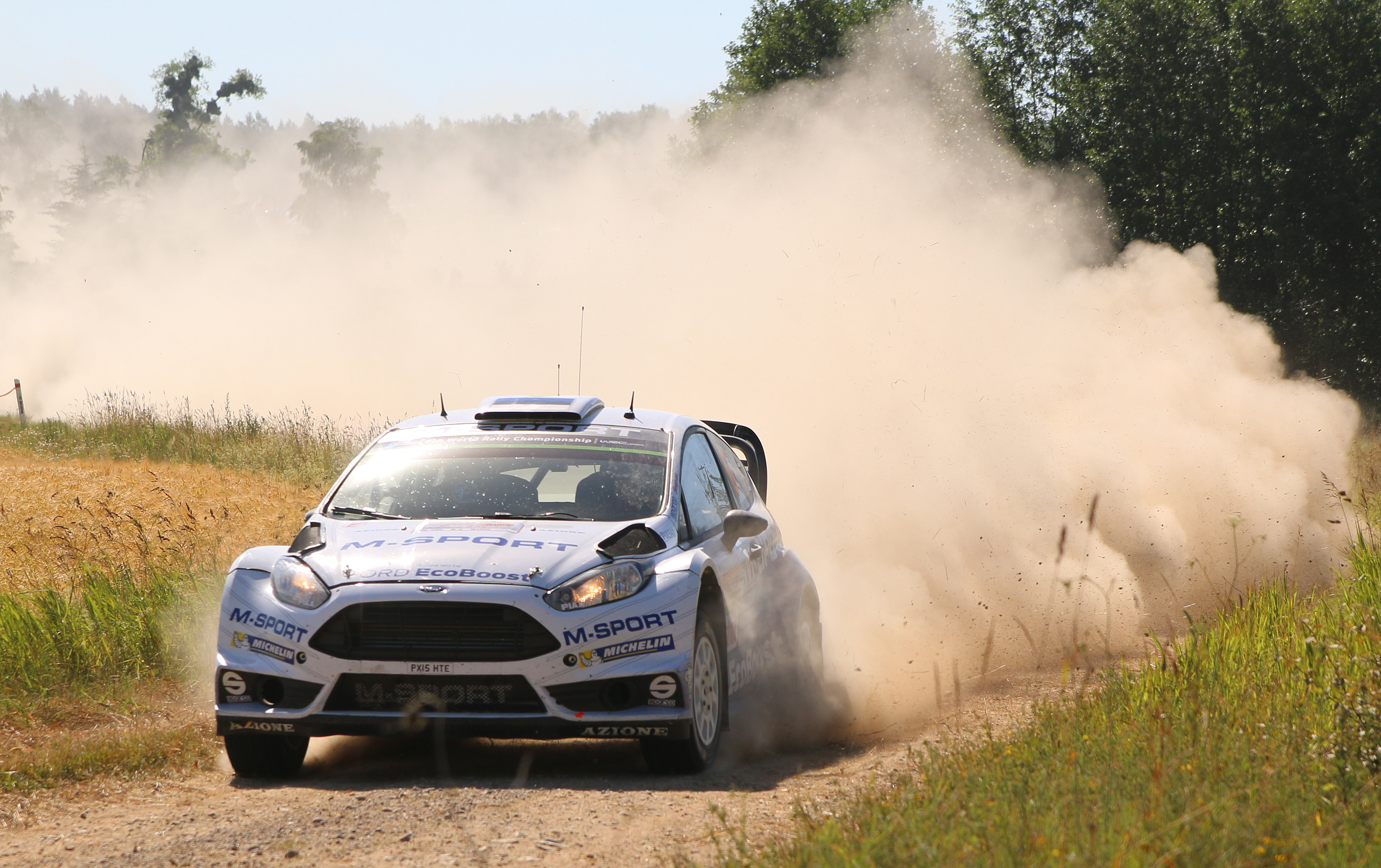
Ott Tänak at the 2015 Rally Poland

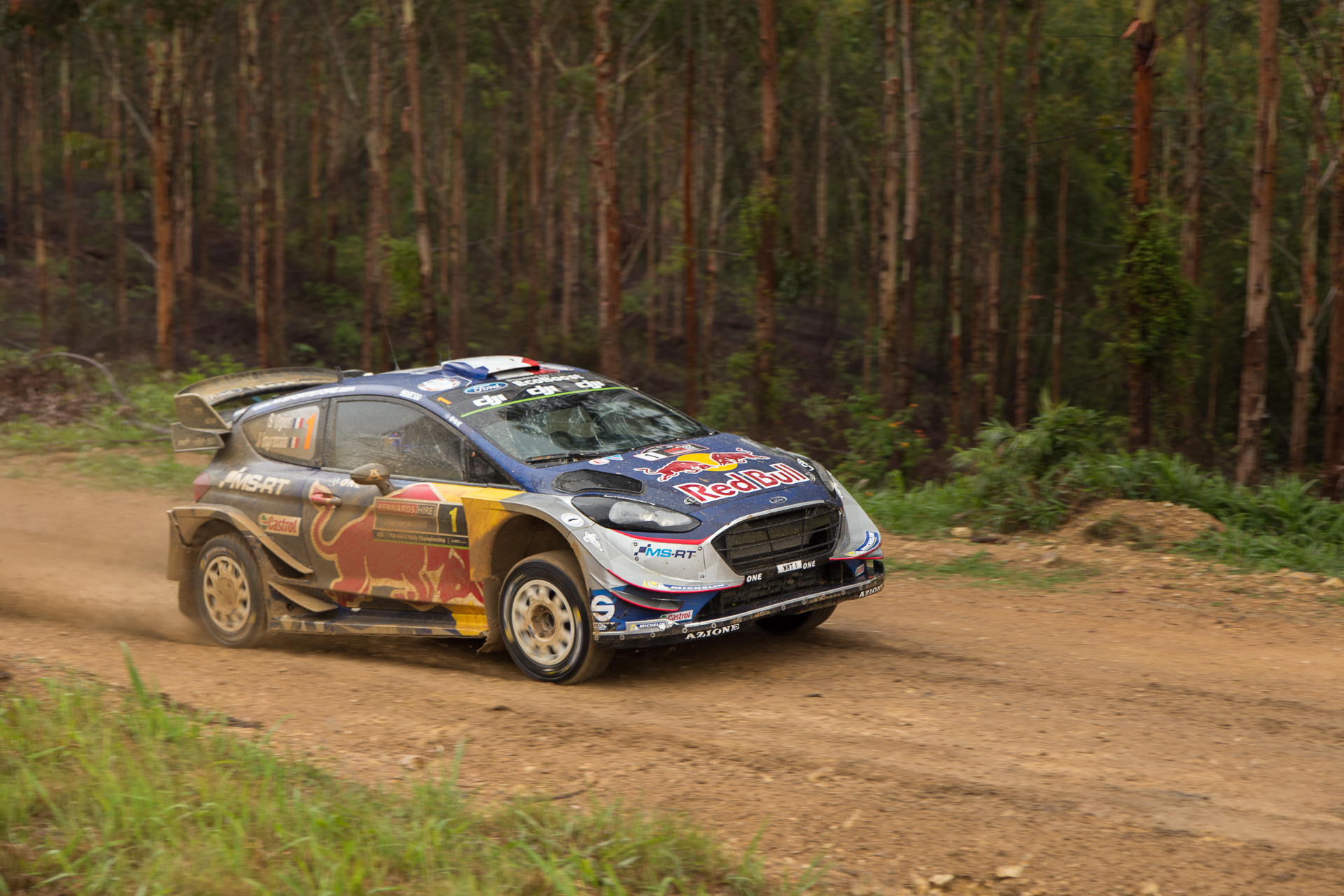
Sébastien Ogier at the 2017 Rally Australia

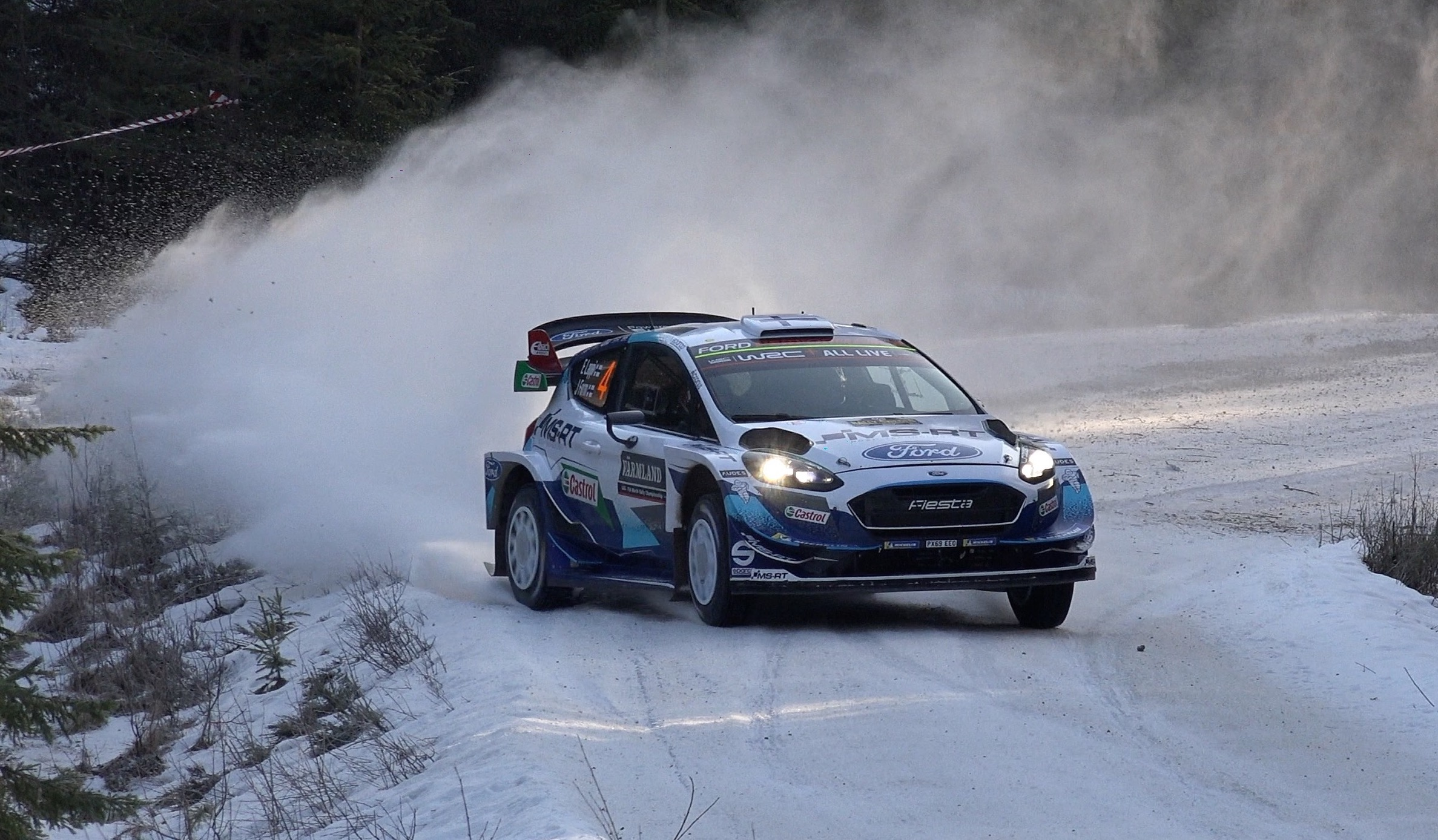
Esapekka Lappi at the 2020 Rally Sweden

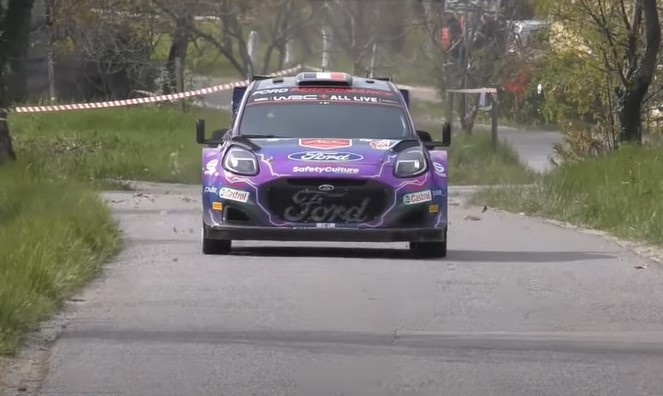
Ford Puma Rally1 at the 2022 Croatia Rally

== See also ==
- Stobart Motorsport
- Ford World Rally Team
- Munchi's Ford World Rally Team
- DMACK World Rally Team
