= Milner =

Milner may refer to:

== People and fictional characters ==
- Milner (surname), a list of people and fictional characters
- Milner (given name), a list of people

== Places ==
- Milner, British Columbia, Canada, a village
- Milner, Colorado, United States, an unincorporated community
- Milner, Georgia, United States, a city

== Other uses ==
- Milner Street, Chelsea, London, England
- Milner baronets, English baronetage
- Milner Award, awarded annually by the Royal Society for outstanding achievements in computer science by a European researcher

== See also ==
- Milner Dam, Idaho, United States
- Milner Pass, Colorado, United States, a pass in the Rocky Mountains
- Milner Square, a garden square in the Barnsbury district of Islington, North London
- Milner's Kindergarten, a group of British diplomats associated with Alfred, Lord Milner
- Milners of Leyburn, a small, family-run department store in Leyburn, North Yorkshire, England
- H. R. Milner Generating Station, a coal-fired station in Alberta, Canada
- Millner (disambiguation)
