= Milliner (surname) =

Milliner is an occupational surname, variant of "Milner", "miller". Its association with the occupation of milliner is unlikely, because the surname is traced to the Middle Ages when the latter occupation was unknown. Notable people with the surname include:

- Bert Milliner (1911–1975), Australian politician
- Dee Milliner (born 1991), American football player
- Eugene Milliner (1878–1921), American baseball player
- Glen Milliner (born 1948), Australian politician, son of Bertie

== See also ==
- Millener (surname)
