= Millner =

Millner may refer to:

== Places ==
- Millner, Northern Territory, Australia
- Electoral division of Millner, Northern Territory, Australia
- TG Millner Field, Australia

== Other uses ==
- Millner (surname)

== See also ==
- Robert Millner Shackleton
- Milner (disambiguation)
- Millinery, the proper name for the maker of hats
