= Richard Millener =

Team Principal of M-Sport World Rally Team

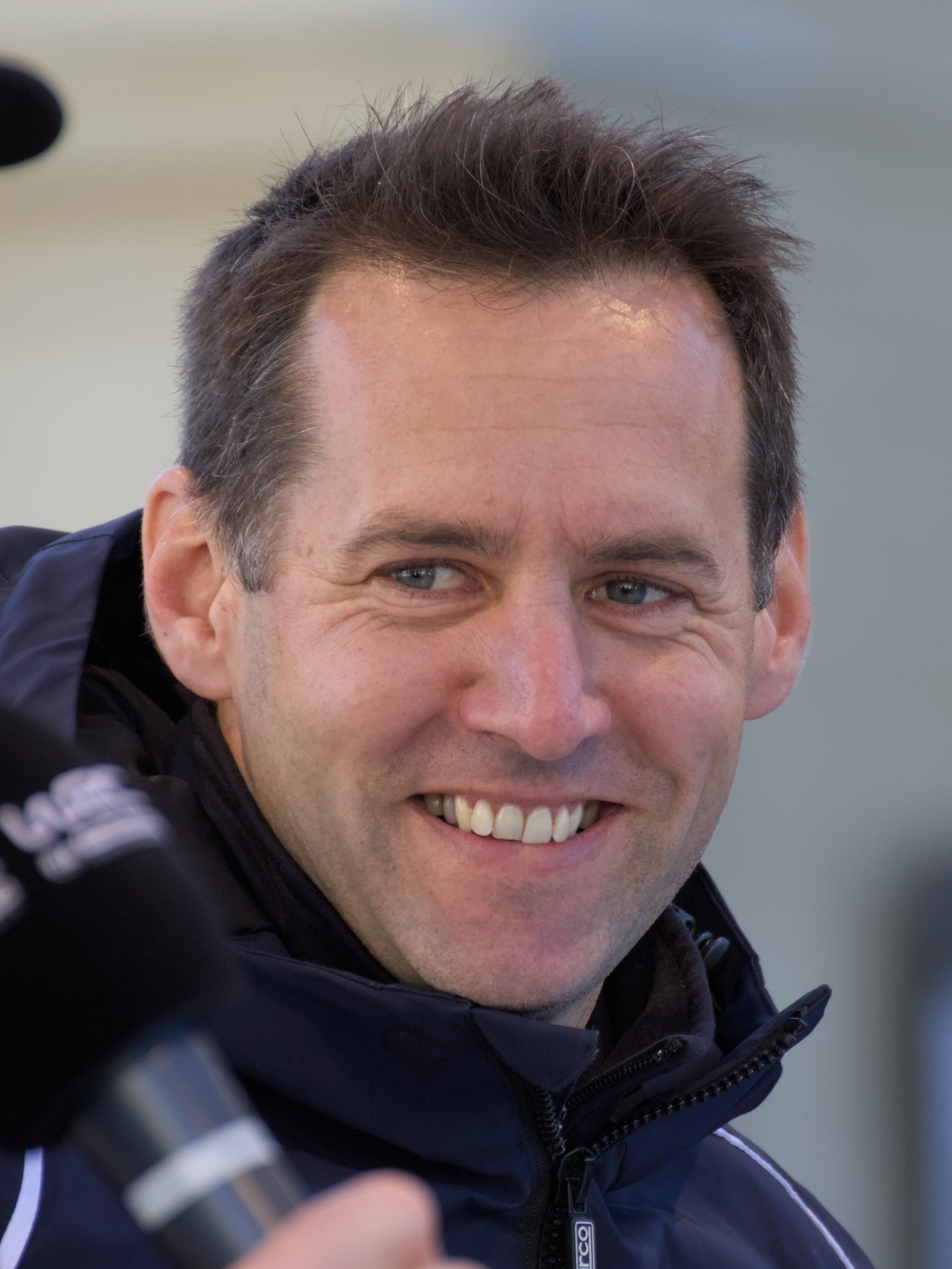
- Millener at the 2023 Central European Rally
- Born: 21 April 1984 (age 42)
- Occupation: Team principal
- Employer: M-Sport World Rally Team

Richard John "Rich" Millener (born 21 April 1984) is a British rally manager. He is the current team principal of M-Sport World Rally Team.

== Biography ==
Millener started working for M-Sport in 2007 with packing and delivering parts for their Ford Fiesta ST's and was later their customer liaison manager. Since 2019, he has been the team principal of the M-Sport World Rally Team, replacing long-time team principal Malcolm Wilson who stepped down from the role.
