= Millner (surname) =

Millner is a surname. Notable people with the surname include:

- David Millner (born 1938), English cricketer
- Denene Millner (born 1968), American author and journalist
- F. Ann Millner, American educator
- Guy Millner (born 1936), American businessman
- James Millner (doctor) (1830–1875), Australian doctor and pioneer
- Jim Millner (1919–2007), Australian pharmacist and corporate executive
- John J. Millner (born 1951), American politician
- Joshua Millner (1849–1931), British sport shooter
- Robert Millner (born 1950), Australian corporate executive
- Setric Millner Jr. (born 2000), American basketball player
- Tivadar Millner (1899–1988), Hungarian inventor
- Wayne Millner (1913–1976), American football player
- Madlyn Millner Kahr (1913–2004), American art historian, and educator
