= Milner (given name) =

Milner is a masculine given name which may refer to:

- Milner Ayala (1928–2001), Paraguayan footballer
- Milner Gray (designer) (1899–1997), British industrial designer
- Milner Gray (politician) (1871–1943), British politician
- Milner Holland (1902–1969), British lawyer and Attorney-General of the Duchy of Lancaster
- Milner Place (1930–2020), English writer and poet
- Milner Tozaka (born 1951), Solomon Islands diplomat and politician
