= 2008 New Year Honours =

British royal recognitions

The New Year Honours 2008 for the Commonwealth realms were announced on 29 December 2007, to celebrate the year passed and mark the beginning of 2008.

The recipients of honours are displayed here as they were styled before their new honour, and arranged firstly by the country whose ministers advised the Queen on the appointments, then by honour, with classes (Knight, Knight Grand Cross, etc.) and then divisions (Military, Civil, etc.) as appropriate.

== United Kingdom ==
=== Member of the Order of the Companions of Honour (CH) ===
- Sir Ian Murray McKellen, CBE, stage and screen actor, for services to drama and to equality.

=== Knight Bachelor ===
- John Michael Ashworth. For public service
- John Irving Bell, Regius Professor of Medicine, University of Oxford and President, Academy of Medical Sciences. For services to medicine
- John James Griffin Good, Chair, Edrington Group. For services to industry in Scotland
- Patrick Hugh Haren, Deputy Chairman, Viridian Group Ltd. For services to the electricity industry in Northern Ireland
- Michael Frank Harris, lately President, Social Security and Child Support Appeals Tribunal and Circuit Judge. For public service
- Roger Mark Jowell, Co-Founder and Director, European Social Survey and Research Professor, City University. For services to social science
- Nicholas Roger Kenyon, Managing Director, Barbican Centre and lately Director, BBC Proms. For services to classical music
- Alasdair Uist Macdonald, Headteacher, Morpeth School, Tower Hamlets, London. For services to education
- Professor Alexander Fred Markham, lately Chief Executive, Cancer Research UK. For services to medicine
- Ian Gerald McAllister, Chair, Network Rail. For services to transport
- Robert Naylor, Chief Executive, University College London Hospitals NHS Foundation Trust. For services to healthcare
- Professor Timothy Michael Martin O'Shea, Principal and Vice-Chancellor, University of Edinburgh. For services to higher education
- Michael Parkinson, Television and Radio Presenter. For services to broadcasting
- Bruce Anthony John Ponder, Head, Department of Oncology, University of Cambridge and Li Ka Shing Professor and director, Cancer Research UK Cambridge Research Institute. For services to medicine
- Stuart Alan Ransom Rose, Chief Executive, Marks & Spencer plc. For services to the retail industry and to corporate social responsibility
- James Meyer Sassoon. For services to the finance industry and to public service
- Professor John Stewart Savill, Professor of Experimental Medicine, Head of the College of Medicine and Veterinary Medicine, and Vice-Principal, University of Edinburgh. For services to clinical science
- John William Sorrell, Chair, the Sorrell Foundation and the London Design Festival. For services to the creative industries
- John Boothman Stuttard, lately Lord Mayor of the City of London. For public service
- Professor Brian William Vickers, Senior Fellow, School of Advanced Study, University of London. For services to literary scholarship
- Professor Ian Wilmut, Director, Scottish Centre for Regenerative Medicine. For services to science

=== Order of the Bath ===
There are three Classes of members of the Order of the Bath:

- Knight Grand Cross (GCB) or Dame Grand Cross (GCB)
- Knight Commander (KCB) or Dame Commander (DCB)
- Companion (CB)

==== Knight Commander of the Order of the Bath (KCB) ====
- Nigel Hamilton, head of the Northern Ireland Civil Service
- William Alexander Jeffrey, permanent secretary, Ministry of Defence
- Vice Admiral Adrian James Johns
- General John Chalmers McColl, late The Royal Anglian Regiment
- General Sir Charles Redmond Watt, late Welsh Guards

==== Companions of the Order of the Bath (CB) ====
Military division

- Rear Admiral Michael Kimmons
- Rear Admiral Andrew David Hugh Mathews
- Major General Jonathon Peter Riley, late The Royal Welch Fusiliers
- Major General Timothy Nicholas Tyler, late Corps of Royal Electrical and Mechanical Engineers
- The Reverend David Edward Wilkes, Royal Army Chaplains' Department
- Air Vice-Marshal John Alfred Cliffe, Royal Air Force
- Air Marshal David John Pocock, Royal Air Force

Civil division

- Nicholas John Bennett, director-general of strategic technologies, Ministry of Defence
- Philip Wynn Owen, director-general, strategy and pensions, Department for Work and Pensions
- Sandra Mary Caldwell, director of field operations, Health and Safety Executive, Department for Work and Pensions
- Joseph Alan Doran, lately director-general of departmental management, Department of Health
- Anthony Michael Christopher Inglese, solicitor and director-general of legal services, Department for Business, Enterprise and Regulatory Reform
- Samuel Thomas Kelly, lately Prime Minister's official spokesman, Prime Minister's Office
- David Alexander Lavery, director-general, Northern Ireland Court Service, Ministry of Justice
- Vanessa Vivienne Lawrence, director-general and chief executive, Ordnance Survey
- Bruce Mann, lately head of the Civil Contingencies Secretariat, Cabinet Office
- Jeanette Mary Pugh, director, safeguarding group, Department for Children, Schools and Families
- Deborah Reynolds, lately Chief Veterinary Officer, Department for Environment, Food and Rural Affairs
- Robert Alexander Talma Stheeman, chief executive, UK Debt Management Office, HM Treasury
- Kenneth David Sutton, deputy-chief executive, Border and Immigration Agency, Home Office

=== Order of St Michael and St George ===
==== Knight Grand Cross of the Order of St Michael and St George (GCMG) ====
- Sir David Geoffrey Manning, lately H.M. Ambassador, Washington

==== Dame Commander of the Order of St Michael and St George (DCMG) ====
- Ms Barbara Logan Hay, H.M. Consul-General, British Consulate General, Istanbul

==== Knight Commander of the Order of St Michael and St George (KCMG) ====
- Charles Richard Vernon Stagg, lately Director General Corporate Affairs, Foreign and Commonwealth Office

==== Companion of the Order of St Michael and St George (CMG) ====
- Hamish St Clair Daniel, Deputy High Commissioner, British High Commission, Karachi, and Director of Trade and Investment for Pakistan
- Miss Janet Elizabeth Douglas, lately Head of Consular Assistance Group, Foreign and Commonwealth Office
- Michael Joseph O'Sullivan, lately Regional Director China, British Council
- Dr Andrew John Pocock, H.M. Ambassador, Harare
- Michael Ryder, Deputy Head of Mission, British Embassy, Kabul
- Miss Katherine Lucy Smith, lately Deputy Head of Mission, British Embassy, Tehran

=== Royal Victorian Order ===
==== Knight Commander of the Royal Victorian Order (KCVO) ====
- Captain Norman Lloyd-Edwards, R.D., R.N.R., Lord-Lieutenant of South Glamorgan.
- James Napier Tidmarsh, M.B.E., formerly Lord-Lieutenant of the County and City of Bristol.
- Philip Lavallin Wroughton, Lord-Lieutenant of Berkshire.

==== Commander of the Royal Victorian Order (CVO) ====
- Bridget Katharine, Mrs. Cracroft-Eley, Lord-Lieutenant of Lincolnshire.
- Miss Judith Christine Hanratty, O.B.E., Chairman, Commonwealth Education Trust.
- Peter Michael, Baron Imbert, Q.P.M., J.P., Lord-Lieutenant of Greater London.
- John Dalziel Beveridge Smart, formerly Lord-Lieutenant of Kincardineshire.

==== Lieutenant of the Royal Victorian Order (LVO) ====
- Anthony James George Bowen, J.P., D.L. For services to The Prince's Trust.
- Brian Leslie Davies, Official Secretary to the Governor of New South Wales, Australia.
- Edward Charles Griffiths, Deputy Master of the Household.
- Norman Thain, M.V.O., Clerk of Works, Balmoral Estate.
- Robert Douglas Watt, formerly Chief Herald of Canada.

==== Member of the Royal Victorian Order (MVO) ====
- Ian Anderson. For services to The Duke of Edinburgh's Commonwealth Study Conferences.
- Miss Karen Hilary Ashworth, Paintings Conservator, Royal Collection.
- Julian Graham Birt, Senior Landing Site Officer, The Queen's Helicopter Flight.
- (John) Michael (Greene) Blair, T.D., Clerk to the Lieutenancy of Angus.
- Miss Siobhan Caroline Brooks, Personal Assistant to The Prince of Wales.
- Miss Julia Davis, Manager, Royal Accounts, Coutts & Co.
- Elizabeth Jane, Mrs. Duggan, formerly Manager, Royal Enclosure Office, Ascot Racecourse.
- Peter Antony Dunn, formerly Senior Audit Manager, KPMG.
- Graham Robert Finn, Accountant, Royal Travel.
- Ian Frank Johnston, Lieutenancy Team Manager, Lancashire County Council.
- Huw Cefin Jones, R.V.M., Senior Sous Chef, Royal Household.
- Peter David May, Building Services Supervisor, St. James's and Kensington Palaces.
- Hemi Mitic. For services to The Duke of Edinburgh's Commonwealth Study Conferences.
- Miss Melissa Sarah Morris, Secretary, Lord Chamberlain's Office.
- Nicholas James Mould, Deputy Land Steward, Eastern District, Duchy of Cornwall.
- Anne, Mrs. Owens, Assistant to the Clerk of the Lieutenancy, Manchester.
- David Paul Pogson, Senior Press Officer, Royal Household.
- Graham Michael Pullen, Producer, The Prince's Trust Concerts and Concert for Diana.
- Inspector John Joseph Smyth, Metropolitan Police. For services to Royalty Protection.
- Emma Elizabeth Jane, Mrs. Stuart, Assistant Bibliographer, Royal Library.
- John Lee Stubbs, Head Gamekeeper, Crown Estate, Windsor Great Park.
- Simon John George Waring, Director of Training, Outward Bound Trust.

==== Medal of the Royal Victorian Order (RVM) ====
Bar to the Royal Victorian Medal (Silver)

- John Gilbert Emery, R.V.M., Livery Porter, Windsor Castle.

Royal Victorian Medal (Silver)

- Lee Anthony Baldock, Chauffeur to The Prince of Wales and The Duchess of Cornwall.
- Peter John Bourner, Sawmill Manager, Sandringham Estate.
- Constable Keith Andrew Chadband, Metropolitan Police. For services to Royalty Protection.
- Richard William Hubert Codman, Farm Foreman, Sandringham Estate.
- Nichola, Mrs. Colman, Public Enterprises Secretary, Sandringham Estate.
- Lee Dobson, Head Valet to The Prince of Wales.
- Rodney Arthur Frowhawk, formerly Tractor Driver/Agricultural Engineer, Sandringham Estate.
- Kenneth Giles, Night Warder, State Apartments, Kensington Palace.
- John Richard Henderson, Yeoman Bed Goer, The Queen's Body Guard of the Yeomen of the Guard.
- Miss Frances May Hoare, Senior Retail Assistant, Windsor Castle.
- Elisabeth Mabel, Mrs. McInnes, formerly Flower Arranger, Palace of Holyroodhouse.
- Barry John Mitford, Page of the Backstairs.
- Geoffrey Peers, formerly Horticulturalist, Home Park Private, Windsor.
- Thomas Edward Trent, Yeoman Warder/Assistant Ravenmaster, HM Tower of London.

=== Order of the British Empire ===
The Order includes five classes in civil and military divisions; in decreasing order of seniority, these are:

- Knight Grand Cross (GBE) or Dame Grand Cross (GBE)
- Knight Commander (KBE) or Dame Commander (DBE)
- Commander (CBE)
- Officer (OBE)
- Member (MBE)

==== Dames Commander of the Order of the British Empire (DBE) ====
- Lynne Janie Brindley, Chief Executive, British Library
- Kay Elizabeth Davies, Lee's Prof of Anatomy, University of Oxford and director, Functional Genetics Unit, Medical Research Council
- Nuala Patricia O'Loan, former Police Ombudsman for Northern Ireland
- Fiona Claire Reynolds, (at the time) Director-General, National Trust for Places of Historic Interest or Natural Beauty
- Mary Elizabeth Tanner, President, World Council of Churches
- Jacqueline Wilson, children's author and former Children's Laureate

==== Knights Commander of the Order of the British Empire (KBE) ====
- David Frank Richmond, C.M.G., lately Director General, Defence and Intelligence, Foreign and Commonwealth Office.
- David Tang Wing-cheung, O.B.E. For charitable services in the UK and British interests in Hong Kong.

==== Commanders of the Order of the British Empire (CBE) ====
- Diana Babar, Team Leader, Litigation and Employment Group, Treasury Solicitor's Department. London.
- Graham Michael Badmam, Director of Children's Services, Kent County Council. For services to Local Government.
- Matthew David Baggott, QPM Chief Constable, Leicestershire Constabulary. For services to the Police. (London)
- Eileen Bell, Lately Presiding Officer (Speaker), Northern Ireland Assembly. For public service. (Down)
- Maurice Bennett Entrepreneur. For services to the Retail Industry. (London, NW11)
- Dr Margaret Bent, Senior Research Fellow, All Souls College, Oxford. For services to Musicology. (Oxford, Oxfordshire)
- Angela Mary, Lady Bernstein of Craigweil. For services to the Arts. (London, SW3)
- Richard Edward Bradbury, Chief Executive, River Island. For services to the Retail Industry. (Hertford, Hertfordshire)
- Dr Christine Braddock, Principal, Matthew Boulton College, Birmingham. For services to Further Education. (Rock, Worcestershire)
- Professor Michael Alan Brown, DL, Vice-Chancellor, Liverpool John Moores University. For services to Higher Education and to the community in Liverpool. (Wirral)
- Elisabeth Mary Buggins, Chair, NHS West Midlands. For services to Healthcare. (Walsall, West Midlands)
- Andrew Cameron, QPM Chief Constable, Central Scotland Police. For services to the Police. (Ayrshire)
- Evelyn Collins, Chief Executive, Equality Commission for Northern Ireland. For public service. (Belfast)
- John Condron, Chief Executive, Yell Group plc. For services to Business. (London, N6)
- Allan Edward Cook, Chief Executive, Cobham plc. For services to the Defence and Aerospace Industries. (Ferndown, Dorset)
- Bronwen Mary Curtis, Lately Civil Service Commissioner and Chairman, Northampton General Hospital NHS Trust. For services to the community. (Daventry, Northamptonshire)
- Anthony Gordon Douglas, Chief Executive, Children and Family Court Advisory and Support Service. For services to Family Justice and to Adoption. (London, N7)
- Malcolm Terry Earnshaw, Lately Director-General, Incorporated Society of British Advertisers. For services to the Advertising Industry. (Edith Weston, Rutland)
- Murray Simpson Easton, Managing Director, Submarine Solutions, BAE Systems. For services to the Maritime Industry. (Lindal, Cumbria)
- Professor Michael Anthony John Ferguson, Professor of Molecular Parasitology, University of Dundee. For services to Science. (Dundee)
- Brendan Foster, MBE, Founder, Great North Run. For services to Sport. (Stocksfield, Northumberland)
- Dr Thomas Jude Frawley. For public services in Northern Ireland. (Lo)
- Professor Stephen Byram Furber, ICL Professor of Computer Engineering, University of Manchester. For services to Computer Science. (Manchester, Greater Manchester)
- Alan Douglas Garwood, Lately Head of Defence Export Services, Ministry of Defence. (Hertfordshire)
- Dennis Godfrey, Lately Grade 5, Northern Ireland Office. (Belfast)
- Dr David William Golding. For services to the World Poverty Campaign. (Whitley Bay, Tyne and Wear)
- Mark Ian Goldring, Chief Executive Officer, Voluntary Services Overseas. For services to Disadvantaged People. (Richmond, Surrey)
- Teresa Colomba Graham, OBE, Lately Deputy Chair, Better Regulation Commission. For public service. (London, SW1V)
- Robert John Green, Lately Director, Inspectorate Reform, Ofsted, Department for Children, Schools and Families. (Thames Ditton, Surrey)
- Professor Jeremy John Denis Greenwood, Lately Director, British Trust for Ornithology. For services to Conservation. (Balmullo, Fife)
- Terry Hanafin, Lately Chief Executive, Essex Strategic Health Authority. For services to the NHS. (London, SE11)
- Richard Gordon Handover, Chair, Adult Learning Inspectorate. For services to Skills and to Industry. (Marlborough, Wiltshire)
- Keith Hargrave, Lately Headteacher, The Canterbury High School, Kent. For services to Education. (Deal, Kent)
- Dr Jonathan Watson Hargreaves, Lately Chief Executive, Scottish Water. For services to the Water Industry. (Morpeth, Northumberland)
- Lorna Harris, Head of International Co-operation Unit and Civil Recovery Unit, Crown Office and Procurator Fiscal Service, Scottish Executive. (Roxburgh)
- Dr Felicity Harvey, Director of Medicines, Pharmacy and Industry Group, Department of Health. (London, SW17)
- Professor Christine Hawley, Architect and Teacher. For services to Architectural Education. (London, SE15)
- Peter John Hill, Chief Executive, Laird Group plc. For services to the Engineering Industry. (London, SW1W)
- Ann Denise Hogbin, Chef de Mission, Commonwealth Games Council for England. For services to Sport. (London, SE15)
- Timothy Richard Hornsby, Commissioner, National Lottery. For public service. (London, SE21)
- Rachel Mary Rosalind Hurst, OBE Director, Disability Awareness in Action. For services to disabled people. (Hullavington, Wiltshire)
- Claire Ighodaro, For services to Business. (Weybridge, Surrey)
- Selwyn Dyson Image, JP, Founder, Emmaus Communities in UK. For services to Homeless People. (Cambridge, Cambridgeshire)
- Peter Ivan Jones, Lately Chair, Horserace Totalisator Board. For services to the Racing Industry. (Bridport, Dorset)
- Dr Bill Kirkup, Director-General, Clinical Programmes, Department of Health. (Gateshead, Tyne and Wear)
- Professor David Knowles, Senior Associate, The King's Fund. For services to Healthcare. (Kingston, Surrey)
- Hanif Kureishi, Playwright, Author and Director. For services to Literature and Drama. (London, W11)
- Dr Angela Isabella Agnes Lennox, MBE DL, General Medical Practitioner, Leicester. For services to Healthcare. (Leicester, Leicestershire)
- Brian Henry Leonard, Director, Industry Directorate, Culture, Creativity and Economy Group, Department for Culture, Media and Sport. (London, EC2Y)
- Susan Lewis, Her Majesty's Chief Inspector of Education and Training in Wales. For services to Education. (Cardiff, South Glamorgan)
- Alex Linkston, Chief Executive, West Lothian Council. For services to Local Government. (Linlithgow, West Lothian)
- Ann Judith Lloyd, Head of Health and Social Services Department and Chief Executive NHS Wales, Welsh Assembly Government. (Gloucestershire)
- Elizabeth Ann Lloyd, Lately Special Adviser, Prime Minister's Office. (London, SE27)
- Irene Lucas, Chief Executive, South Tyneside Metropolitan Borough Council. For services to Local Government. (Whitburn, Tyne and Wear)
- Professor Valerie Joan Lund, Professor of Rhinology, Ear Institute and Honorary Consultant, Royal National Throat, Nose and Ear Hospital, Royal Free NHS Trust. For services to Medicine. (Wraysbury, Middlesex)
- Matthew MacLeod Maciver, Chief Executive and Registrar, General Teaching Council for Scotland. For services to Education. (Edinburgh)
- Angela Mason, OBE, Lately Director, Women and Equality Unit, Department for Communities and Local Government. (London, NW1)
- Stella, Mbubaegbu, Principal and Chief Executive, Highbury College, Portsmouth and Chair, Black Leadership Initiative. For services to Further Education. (Orpington, Kent)
- Patrick Mccartan, Chair, Labour Relations Agency. For services to Employment Relations in Northern Ireland. (Bangor, Down)
- Shaun George Mcnally, Area Director, Cheshire/Merseyside, HM Courts Service, Ministry of Justice. (Lancashire)
- Professor David Harry Metcalf, Lately Commissioner, Low Pay Commission. For public service. (London, N7)
- John Frederick Mills, Lately Director of Rural Policy, Department for Environment, Food and Rural Affairs. (London)
- Stewart Milne, Chair and Chief Executive, Stewart Milne Group. For services to the Housebuilding Industry in Scotland. (Aberdeen)
- Professor Michael William John Noble, OBE, Professor of Social Policy, University of Oxford. For services to Social Research on Poverty and Deprivation. (Oxford, Oxfordshire)
- Dr George Matthew Paterson, Director, Food Standards Agency, Scotland. (Aberdeen)
- Elizabeth Peace. For services to the Property Industry. (Alton, Hampshire)
- Her Honour Judge Valerie Anne Pearlman, Senior Circuit Judge. For services to the Administration of Justice. (London)
- Professor Ole Holger Petersen, George Holt Professor of Physiology, University of Liverpool and Medical Research Council Research Professor. For services to Science. (Liverpool, Merseyside)
- Leslie Samuel Phillips, OBE, Actor. For services to Drama. (London, W9)
- Julian Benjamin Pipe, Mayor, London Borough of Hackney. For services to Local Government. (London, E8)
- Professor Martyn Poliakoff, Research Professor in Chemistry, The University of Nottingham. For services to Science. (Nottingham, Nottinghamshire)
- David William Quysner, Chair, Abingworth Management Limited. For services to the Venture Capital Industry. (Polegate, East Sussex)
- Professor Seona Reid, Director, Glasgow School of Art. For services to the Creative Industries. (Glasgow)
- Paula Frances Cooper Ridley, OBE, Lately Chair, Board of Trustees, Victoria and Albert Museum. For services to the Arts. (Liverpool, Merseyside)
- Dr Brian Woods-Scawen, DL. For services to Business and to the community in the West Midlands. (Kenilworth, Warwickshire)
- Professor William Christie Shaw, Professor of Orthodontics, University of Manchester. For services to Dentistry. (Didsbury, Greater Manchester)
- Professor Jonathan Paul Shepherd, Director, Violence and Society Research Group, Cardiff University. For services to Healthcare and to the Criminal Justice System. (South Glamorgan)
- Dr Charles Robert Saumarez Smith, Lately Director, National Gallery. For services to Art. (London, E1)
- John Allan Raymond Smith. For services to Medical Education and to Training. (Durrington, Wiltshire)
- Professor Brian Geoffrey Spratt, Professor of Molecular Microbiology, Imperial College Faculty of Medicine, London. For services to Science. (Holton, Oxfordshire)
- David John Still, Managing Director, Clipper Windpower. For services to the Energy Industry. (Haltwhistle, Northumberland)
- Teresa Anne Stirling, Head of Histories, Openness and Records Unit, Cabinet Office. (Ovingdean, East Sussex)
- Nigel John Ivo Stourton, OBE. For charitable services. (Bedale, North Yorkshire)
- John Joseph Paul Studzinski. For services to the Arts and to Charity. (London, SW10)
- Richard Summersgill, Director of Child Benefit and Tax Credit Offices, HM Revenue and Customs. (Lancashire)
- John Ivan Tiner, Lately Chief Executive, Financial Services Authority. For services to the Finance Industry. (Dorking, Surrey)
- Stanley William Tracey, OBE, Pianist and Composer. For services to Jazz Music. (St Albans, Hertfordshire)
- Marjorie Shiona Wallace, MBE, Founder and Chief Executive, SANE. For services to Mental Healthcare. (London, N6)
- Sarah Waller, Nurse and Programme Director, King's Fund. For services to Nursing and to the NHS. (Swindon, Wiltshire)
- Julie Walters, OBE, Actor. For services to Drama. (London, W1D)
- Professor Martin Wasik, Lately Chair, Sentencing Advisory Panel. For services to the Criminal Justice System. (Cheshire)
- Helen Weir, Group Finance Director, Lloyds TSB. For services to the Finance Industry. (London, EC2V)
- John Norton Braithwaite Whitney. For services to Radio Broadcasting and to the Arts. (Todbar, Dorset)
- Philip Frederick Williamson, Lately Chief Executive, Nationwide Building Society. For services to the Finance Industry. (Haywards Heath, West Sussex)
- Paul Young, OBE, Chief Fire Officer, Devon and Somerset Fire and Rescue Service. For services to Local Government. (Cullompton, Devon)

==== Officers of the Order of the British Empire (OBE) ====
- Pauline Ann Adams, Chair, Crossroads Wales. For services to Carers. (Swansea)
- Nicholas John Adkin, Tobacco Programme Manager, Department of Health. (London, N16)
- Mushtaq Ahmad, Lately Provost, South Lanarkshire Council. For services to Local Government. (Hamilton, Lanarkshire)
- John Akomfrah, Director. For services to the film industry. (London, N1)
- George Maxwell Alagiah, Broadcaster and Author. For services to Journalism. (London, N16)
- Graham Ashmore, Head of European and Cluster Policy, UK Trade and Investment, West Midlands Region. For services to International Trade.(Stourport on Severn, Worcestershire)
- Christopher John Atkinson, JP, DL, For services to the Administration of Justice in Sheffield. (Sheffield, South Yorkshire)
- Dr Michael Richard Atkinson, For services to the community in Balsall Heath, Birmingham. (Birmingham, West Midlands)
- John Azah, Vice-Chair, Independent Advisory Group, Metropolitan Police Service. For services to Community Relations in London. (Worcester Park, Surrey)
- Dr David Eric Barnardo, Vice-President and lately Chair, Barnardo's. For services to Social Care for Children. (Great Witcombe, Gloucestershire)
- Lynette Pamela Ann Barnes, Director, Ripon Council for Voluntary Service. For services to the Voluntary Sector in North Yorkshire. (Ripon, North Yorkshire)
- Dr Robert Barr, Managing Director, Manchester Geomatics Ltd. For services to Geography. (Lymm, Cheshire)
- John Bernard Barradell, Lately Chief Officer, Metropolitan Police Special Constabulary. For services to the Police. (London, SE7)
- Sarah Ann Bazin, Therapy Services Manager, Heart of England NHS Foundation Trust and Chair, Chartered Society of Physiotherapy. For services to Healthcare. (Warwick, Warwickshire)
- Dr Geoffrey Beard, Co-Founder, Furniture History Society. For services to Heritage. (Bath, Somerset)
- Paul Godfrey Beard, Lately Chair, Health and Social Care Advisory Service and Regional Director, Royal College of Nursing. For services to Healthcare. (London, N1)
- Roger Begy, Chair, Learning and Skills Council, Lincolnshire and Rutland. For services to Further Education and Training. (Oakham, Rutland)
- Ann Beynon, Director Wales, BT Group. For services to Business. (Cardiff, South Glamorgan)
- Iwona Blazwick, Director, Whitechapel Art Gallery. For services to Art. (London, N7)
- Paul Bleasdale, Head, Pensions and Medical Fitness Unit, School Resources Group, Department for Children, Schools and Families. (Darlington, Durham)
- Geoffrey Charles Bond, DL, For charitable services. (Southwell, Nottinghamshire)
- David Bowles, Chair, Northern Defence Industries. For services to the Defence Industry. (Sedgefield, Durham)
- Thomas Wilson Boyd, DL, For services to the Fishing Industry and to the community in Kingston-upon-Hull. (Beverley, East Riding of Yorkshire)
- Paul Breach, Executive Director, Northern Defence Industries. For services to the Hospitality Industry. (London, SW10)
- Barbara Dana Broccoli, Film Producer. For services to the Film Industry. (London, W1J)
- Gordon Brown, Lately Head of Freshwater Fisheries and Aquaculture Division, Marine Directorate, Scottish Executive. (Kinross-shire)
- Nigel Brown, For services to Business and to the community in Cambridgeshire. (Cambridge, Cambridgeshire)
- Rodney William Brown, Emergency Services Liaison Team Leader, Highways Agency, Department for Transport. (Holmer Green, Buckinghamshire)
- Professor Margaret Ann Buck, Lately Head, Central Saint Martins College of Art and Design (UAL). For services to Arts and Design Education. (London, SE22)
- David Robert Burge, Head of Police Finance and Pension Unit, Home Office. (Upminster, Essex)
- Audrey Ruth Burton, For charitable services in Harrogate, North Yorkshire. (Harrogate, North Yorkshire)
- David William Butler, Chief Executive, National Confederation of Parent Teacher Associations. For services to the Community and to Education. (Sevenoaks, Kent)
- Dr Donald Reeve Buttress, LVO, Architect and Surveyor. For services to the Conservation of Cathedrals. (St Albans, Hertfordshire)
- Dr Dolores Cecelia Byrne, Managing Director, Public Sector, QinetiQ. For services to the Defence Industry. (Fareham, Hampshire)
- Michael Anthony Cairns, Lately Commissioner of English Heritage. For services to Heritage. (Weybridge, Surrey)
- Daniel Carrigan, For services to Health and Safety. (Cumbernauld, Glasgow)
- Professor Robert Harvey Cassen, Emeritus Fellow, St Antony's College, Oxford and Visiting Professor, London School of Economics. For services to Education. (London, NW3)
- Stephen Edward Linton Clarke, For services to Maritime Heritage and to the community in Bideford, Devon. (Bideford, Devon)
- Neil Claxton, For services to Music. (Stockport, Cheshire)
- The Reverend David Roy Coffey, President, Baptist World Alliance. For services to Inter-faith Relations. (Didcot, Oxfordshire)
- Jasper Alexander Thirlby Conran, Designer. For services to the Retail Industry. (London, W1S)
- Michael Brian Cookson, President, British Cycling Federation. For services to Sport. (Clitheroe, Lancashire)
- Robert Coxon, Chair, Centre for Process Innovation. For services to the Chemicals Industry in the North East. (Stockton-on-Tees, Durham)
- David Beresford Cragg, MBE, Regional Director, Learning and Skills Council, West Midlands. For services to Training and to Education. (Birmingham, West Midlands)
- The Honourable Noel Quayle Cringle, President of Tynwald. For public service in the Isle of Man. (Rushen, Isle of Man)
- Dinah Selma Crystal, For services to the Pro Bono Legal Services. (Bowdon, Cheshire)
- Sally Cullen, Liaison Magistrate, Rome, Crown Prosecution Service. (Rome, 00186 ROME)
- Anthony Clive Davies, Managing Director, Focus Education UK Ltd. For services to School Inspections. (Oldham, Lancashire)
- Byron Davies, Chief Executive, Cardiff City Council. For services to Local Government in Wales. (Cowbridge, South Glamorgan)
- Susan Margaret Davies, Chief Executive, Wessex Archaeology. For services to Heritage. (Salisbury, Wiltshire)
- Nina Alexandra Dawes, Chief Executive, Lichfield District Council. For services to Local Government and to Flood Rescue in Staffordshire. (Stafford, Staffordshire)
- Dr Rosemarie Dickie, Lately Chair, Northamptonshire Police Authority. For services to the community in Northamptonshire. (Northampton, Northamptonshire)
- Sandie Dixie, Headteacher, Greenhill Primary School, Oldham. For services to Education. (Stalybridge, Lancashire)
- Captain Michael Fulford-Dobson, CVO, Lately Lord Lieutenant of Dorset. (Cerne Abbas, Dorset)
- Roy Dotrice, Actor. For services to Drama. (London, WC2N)
- Gillian Vera Drummond, DL, President, Association of Garden Trusts. For services to the Environment. (Southampton, Hampshire)
- William Charles Dryburgh, Grade B1, Ministry of Defence. (Dunfermline, Fife)
- Professor Clair Evelyn Houssemayne du Boulay, Postgraduate Dean, Wessex Deanery, NHS Education South Central. For services to Medicine. (Alresford, Hampshire)
- David Hunter Duncan, Lately Provost, North Ayrshire Council. For services to Local Government. (Kilwinning, Ayrshire and Arran)
- Professor Philip Arthur Dyer, Consultant Clinical Scientist, Manchester Royal Infirmary. For services to Medicine. (Bury, Greater Manchester)
- Dr Edith Maureen Sarah Edmondson, Chair, Northern Ireland Food Advisory Committee, Food Standards Agency. For public service. (Newtownards, Down)
- Margaret Elliott, For services to the community in Sunderland, Tyne and Wear. (Sunderland, Tyne and Wear)
- Michele Elliott, Director and Founder, Kidscape. For services to Children. (London, W2)
- Victor Reginald Emery, Managing Director, BAE Systems Surface Fleet Solutions. For services to the Shipbuilding Industry. (Newcastle upon Tyne, Tyne and Wear)
- Helen Elizabeth Moss Evans, For services to the Quartet Community Foundation, Bristol. (Stoke Bishop, Bristol)
- Robert Cameron Farmer, Head of Contingency Planning, Department for Environment, Food and Rural Affairs. (Aldershot, Hampshire)
- Joan Fenton, Lately Headteacher, Dyce School, Aberdeen. For services to Education. (Alford, Aberdeenshire)
- Ian Bennett Flanagan, Vice-President, Perennial-Gardeners' Royal Benevolent Society. For services to Horticulture. (Woldingham, Surrey)
- Rachael Heyhoe-Flint, MBE, DL, For services to Cricket. (Wolverhampton, West Midlands)
- Nicola Francis, Debt Enforcement Project Manager, Kidscape Charity, Department for Work and Pensions. (Tavistock, Devon)
- Kenneth Vincent Fraser, Operations Manager, County Court Bulk Centre, HM Courts Service. (Northampton, Northamptonshire)
- Romy Fraser, Founder, Neal's Yard Remedies. For services to the Health and Beauty Industry. (Musbury, Devon)
- Michael Peter Galloway, Director, Planning and Transportation, Dundee City Council. For services to Urban Design and Regeneration. (Dundee)
- Victor Galyer, Headteacher, Challney High School for Boys and Community College, Luton, Bedfordshire. For services to Education. (Luton, Bedfordshire)
- Eric Michael Garston, For charitable services. (London, W14)
- Michael Gault, For services to Shooting. (East Dereham, Norfolk)
- Timothy Stephen Gbedemah, Non-Executive Director, Border and Immigration Agency, Home Office. For public service. (London, SW11)
- Michael John Stanley Gibbons, For services to Regulatory Reform. (Welwyn, Hertfordshire)
- Michael Charles Gilbert, Lately Assistant Director, Energy Resilience Directorate. For services to the Gas and Electricity Industries. (Holbeach St Johns, Lincolnshire)
- Barbara Margaret Gildea, Executive Vice-President, Human Resources, Rolls-Royce. For services to Business. (London, SW1E)
- Professor Alan Henry Puckridge Gillett, For services to the Royal Institution of Chartered Surveyors and to the community in Ealing, West London. (London, W5)
- Robert Alan Gilmore, Lately Chief Executive, Banbridge District Council. For services to Local Government in Northern Ireland. (Banbridge, Down)
- Michael Goddard, For services to Technology. (Addlestone, Surrey)
- Deborah Louise Goodwin, Lately Member, Audit Committee, Training and Development Agency for Schools. For services to the community and to Education. (London, SW12)
- Diana Grahame, MVO, Secretary, Victoria Cross and George Cross Association. For charitable services. (London, SW11)
- Dr Michael Grainger, Lately Headteacher, Barnard Castle Church of England Primary School, Durham. For services to Education. (Bishop Auckland, Durham)
- Michael Greenway, Senior Consultant, EADS Defence and Security UK Ltd. For services to Business in Wales. (Monmouthshire)
- Chief Inspector Peter Mark Edward Griffiths, For services to the Criminal Justice System in West Yorkshire. (Wakefield, West Yorkshire)
- Richard Griffiths, Actor. For services to Drama. (Stratford-upon-Avon, Warwickshire)
- Ann Marie Grinstead, Lately Non-Executive Director, Valuation Office Agency. For public service. (Liss, Hampshire)
- Tricia Guild, Chair, Designers Guild. For services to Interior Design. (London, W11)
- Sister Brigid Halligan, Headteacher, Bellerive FCJ Catholic College, Liverpool. For services to Education. (Liverpool, Merseyside)
- Colin David Harbin, Lately Deputy Director, Border and Immigration Agency, Home Office. (Chalfont St Giles, Buckinghamshire)
- Dr John Winsor Harcup, For services to Health and to Heritage in Malvern, Worcestershire. (Malvern, Worcestershire)
- Roy James Harrison, Chair of Governors, Thomas Telford School; Governor, Sandwell Academy; Chair, Building Construction Committee, Madeley Academy, West Midlands. For services to Education. (Bridgnorth, Shropshire)
- Judith Beryl Hassan, For services to Holocaust Survivors. (London, NW6)
- Laurence Hatchwell, Lead Specialist, Rating Directorate, Valuation Office Agency, HM Revenue and Customs. (Surrey)
- David William Hill, Director and Company Secretary, LEO Pharma. For services to the Pharmaceutical Industry. (Marlow, Buckinghamshire)
- Councillor Martin John Hill, Leader, Lincolnshire County Council. For services to Local Government. (Bourne, Lincolnshire)
- Michael John Hollingbery, Former Chairman, Comet, For services to the community in the East Riding of Yorkshire. (Beverley, East Riding of Yorkshire)
- Elizabeth Howe, General Counsel, International Association of Prosecutors, Crown Prosecution Service.(Nr West Malling, Kent)
- John Andrew Howison, Lately Director, Trunk Road Infrastructure and Professional Services, Transport Scotland, Scottish Executive (Edinburgh)
- Keith Cecil Ross Howman, Lately President, World Pheasant Association. For services to Conservation. (Shepperton, Middlesex)
- Jonathan Peter Douglas-Hughes, DL, Chair, Essex Association of Boys' Clubs. For services to Young People. (Halstead, Essex)
- David Robert Hutchinson, Lately Vice-Chair and Media-Side Chair, Defence Press and Broadcasting Advisory Committee. For services to the Media. (Arundel, West Sussex)
- Alexander Jamieson, Lately Chief Executive, Includem. For Sandy services to the Youth Justice System in Scotland. (Valencia Province)
- Dr Godfrey John Jenkins, Head, Climate Change Programme, Hadley Centre, Meteorological Office. For services to Science. (Yateley, Hampshire)
- Robert Ryan Jervis, Lately Headteacher, Lakelands School, Sports and Language College, Ellesmere, Shropshire. For services to Education. (Shrewsbury, Shropshire)
- Amir Kabal, JP, DL, Member, Learning and Skills Council, National Equality and Diversity Sub-Committee. For services to Training and to the community in East (Barton-under-Needwood)
- Professor Rajvinder Singh Kandola, Member, National Employment Panel. For services to Disadvantaged People and to Diversity. (Leamington Spa, Warwickshire)
- The Venerable Dr Witharandeniye Kassapa, For services to the International Buddhist Relief Organisation. (Birmingham, West Midlands)
- Andrew Keddie, Lately Chair, Scottish Police Conveners' Forum. For public service. (Leven, Fife)
- Sheila Kelly, Executive Director, The Proprietary Association of Great Britain. For services to the Pharmaceutical Industry. (London, E3)
- David John Kendall, Principal, Derwen Independent Specialist College, Shropshire. For services to Special Needs Further Education. (Oswestry, Shropshire)
- Patricia Cecilia Kennedy, Headteacher, St Mark's Primary School, Barrhead, East Renfrewshire. For services to Education. (Newton Mearns, Renfrewshire)
- Professor Lou Kushnick, Lately Honorary Professorial Fellow in Race Relations, University of Manchester. For services to the community and to Higher Education. (Gatley, Cheshire)
- Dr Maeve Kyle, Chair, Coaching Northern Ireland. For services to Athletics. (Ballymena, Antrim)
- Andrew Lake Grade, B1, Ministry of Defence. (London)
- Dr David Leighton, Lately Headteacher, Llanfyllin High School. For services to Education in Wales. (Near Newtown, Powys)
- Kathleen Amy Lemaire, Chief Executive, School Library Association. For services to Education. (Aylesbury, Buckinghamshire)
- Dr Alan Charles Richard Lennon, Lately Chair, Council for Curriculum, Examinations and Assessment. For services to Education in Northern Ireland. (Ballynahinch, Down)
- Penelope Ann Letts, For services to Vulnerable People. (London, SE24)
- Paul Lincoln, Chief Executive, National Heart Forum for Coronary Heart Disease Prevention (UK). For services to Healthcare. (Sutton, Surrey)
- Paul Michael Lincoln, Senior Civil Servant, Ministry of Defence. (London, E1)
- Patrick Littlejohn, For services to Mountaineering. (Caemarfon, Gwynedd)
- Doreen Wilson Lofthouse, MBE, Chairman, Lofthouse of Fleetwood Ltd. For services to Business and to the community in Lancashire. (Little Thornton, Lancashire)
- Alison Logan, For services to Community Relations. (Glasgow)
- Jon Lord, Head, Community Housing Services, Bolton City Council. For services to Social Housing. (Bolton, Greater Manchester)
- Desmond Michael Lynam, Sports Commentator and Broadcaster. For services to Sport. (London, W6)
- William Roderick Macdonald, Chief Executive, British Racing School. For services to the Horse Racing Industry and to Disadvantaged Young People. (Newmarket, Suffolk)
- Alastair Jesse Head Macnish, Lately Chair, Accounts Commission for Scotland. For services to Local Government. (Gourock, Renfrewshire)
- Stephen Maddox, Chief Executive, Wirral Borough Council. For services to Local Government. (Chester, Cheshire)
- Professor Jean Catherine Manson, Head of Transmissible Spongiform Encephalopathy Division and Neuropathogenesis Unit, Roslin Institute. For services to Science. (Midlothian)
- Michele Marie Marken, Principal, St Joseph's College, Belfast. For services to Education. (Belfast)
- Professor Elaine Barbara Martin, Professor in Industrial Statistics, University of Newcastle-upon-Tyne. For services to Science. (Newcastle upon Tyne, Tyne and Wear)
- Nigel Jamie Martin, Managing Partner, Ward Hadaway. For services to Business in the North East. (Gosforth, Tyne and Wear)
- Diana Mason, For services to Equestrian Sport. (Stratford-upon-Avon, Warwickshire)
- Heather Rose Maxwell, Principal, South Devon College. For services to Further Education. (Devon)
- Colin Mcallister, Head of Division in Detection, North Region, HM Revenue and Customs. (Paisley, Lanarkshire)
- Robert Duncan Mccausland, For public service (mostly). (Belfast)
- Dr Philip Gordon Mcclements, Chief Medical Adviser, Northern Ireland Prison Service. For services to Healthcare. (Newtownards, Down)
- Alison Mary Mcdonald, Senior Manager, Processing Directorate, Portsmouth, HM Revenue and Customs. (Chichester, West Sussex)
- Anthony Mcgann, MBE, For services to the community in the Vauxhall and Kirkdale Districts of Liverpool. (Liverpool, Merseyside)
- Lucian Joseph John Mcgrath, Executive Director, Mines Advisory Group. For services to Mine Clearance. (Wirral)
- Bernard Mcguigan, Head of Estate Management, Northern Ireland Office. (Lurgan, Armagh)
- Karen Millen, Co-Founder, Karen Millen. For services to the Retail Industry. (Maidstone, Kent)
- Kylie Ann Minogue, Singer, For services to Music. (London, SW6)
- Jeanne Monckton, Lately Headteacher, Watling Street Primary School, Walsall. For services to Education. (Walsall, West Midlands)
- Stephen Hugh Morgan, Chief Executive, Autism Cymru. For services to People with Autism. (Machynlleth, Powys)
- Professor Treen Carson Michael Morris, Consultant Haematologist, Belfast City Hospital. For services to Medicine in Northern Ireland. (Larne, Antrim)
- Dr Peter Michael Neumann, Tutor in Mathematics, The Queen's College, Oxford and lately Chair, UK Mathematics Trust. For services to Education. (Oxford, Oxfordshire)
- Penelope Ann Newman, Chief Executive Officer, Cafédirect. For services to Ethical Business. (Ruislip, Middlesex)
- Esther Maria O'Callaghan, Entrepreneur and Chair, Young People's Fund, Big Lottery Fund. For services to the Voluntary Sector. (Rochdale, Lancashire)
- Grace Chidozie Ononiwu, Chief Crown Prosecutor, Northamptonshire. (Luton, Bedfordshire)
- Jean Orridge, Headteacher, High Clarence Primary School, Stockton-on-Tees. For services to Education. (Stockton-on-Tees, Durham)
- David Robert Parker, Director, Information and Secretariat, Commonwealth War Graves Commission. For public service. (Maidenhead, Berkshire)
- Stephen Robert Parnaby, Leader, East Riding of Yorkshire Council. For services to Local Government. (Cottingham, East Riding of Yorkshire)
- Maurice Patterson, Head, Eastern Regional Office, Invest NI, Northern Ireland Executive. (Belfast)
- Richard Pearson, JP, Lately Chair, British Institute of Innkeeping. For services to the Hospitality Industry. (Marlow, Buckinghamshire)
- David Alan Peat, Chief Executive, East Lancashire Primary Care Trust. For services to the NHS. (Burnley, Lancashire)
- Sue Pinder, Principal, West Lothian College. For services to Lifelong Learning in Scotland. (Tullibody, Clackmannanshire)
- Frank Christopher Price, For services to Engineering. (Leicestershire)
- Michael John Radford, For services to Animal Welfare Law. (Ross and Cromarty)
- Dr Chennakesavalu Rajagopal, Lately Civilian Medical Practitioner, Ministry of Defence. (Paderborn)
- Stephen Ramsden, Chief Executive, Luton and Dunstable NHS Foundation Trust. For services to Healthcare. (Hemel Hempstead, Herefordshire)
- Mohammed Shahid Raza, For services to the Muslim community in Leicester. (Wembley, Middlesex)
- Philip Howard Reed, Director, Churchill Museum and Cabinet War Rooms. For services to Museums. (London, SE22)
- Samuel Ross Reed, Lately Belfast Harbour Commissioner. For services to the Maritime Industry. (Belfast)
- Alison Richards, For services to UNICEF UK. (Longworth, Oxfordshire)
- Barbara Elizabeth Riddell, Director of Resources, London Fire Brigade. For services to the Fire and Rescue Service. (Edenbridge, Kent)
- Philip Keitch Riddle, Chief Executive, VisitScotland. For services to the Tourist Industry. (Edinburgh)
- Mark David Rimmer, Service Director, Brent Registration and Nationality Service, HM Treasury. (Hitchin, Hertfordshire)
- Christopher Edmund Thurston Rivington, Team Leader, Learning and Skills Council Relationship Management Team, Department for Innovation, Universities and Skills. (Rotherham, South Yorkshire)
- Peter Edward Thomas Robbins, QPM Chief Executive, Internet Watch Foundation. For services to Children and Families. (Royston, Hertfordshire)
- Jason Thorpe Robinson, MBE, Lately England and Sale Sharks Rugby Captain. For services to Sport. (Siddington, Cheshire)
- Dr Peter Leonard Roeder, Lately Animal Health Officer (Virology) and Secretary, Global Rinderpest Eradication Programme. For services to Veterinary Science. (Bordon, Hampshire)
- Trevor Beresford Romeo also known as Jazzie B, For services to Music. (London, NW1)
- Kenneth Ross, Chief Executive, Elphinstone Group Limited. For services to the Construction Industry in Scotland. (Glasgow)
- Dr Trevor James Heather Rothwell, Secretary, Forensic Pathology Council, Home Office. For public service. (Bath, Somerset)
- Professor Philip Routledge, Professor of Clinical Pharmacology and Honorary Consultant Physician, Cardiff and Vale NHS Trust. For services to Medicine. (Cardiff, South Glamorgan)
- Deborah Stedman-Scott, DL, Chief Executive, Tomorrow's People. For services to Unemployed People. (Hastings, East Sussex)
- Michael Gordon Scott, Lately Grade B1, Ministry of Defence. (Westbury, Wiltshire)
- Janet Seaton, Lately Head of Research and Information Services, Scottish Parliament. (Langport, Somerset)
- Anton Setchell, Assistant Chief Constable, Association of Chief Police Officers. For services to the Police. (High Wycombe, Buckinghamshire)
- Professor Martin Peter Severs, Associate Dean (Clinical Practice), Faculty of Science, University of Portsmouth. For services to Medicine. (Portsmouth, Hampshire)
- Christopher Sheffield, Senior Manager, HM Prison Manchester. (Formby, Merseyside)
- Kathleen Silvestro, Manager, Contact Centre, Bathgate, West Lothian, HM Revenue and Customs. (Edinburgh)
- Douglas Slocombe, Cinematographer. For services to the Film Industry. (London, SW7)
- Professor Louis Smidt, Chair, West London Mental Health NHS Trust. For services to Healthcare. (London, N1)
- Delia Smith, Headteacher, St Angela's Ursuline School, Newham, London. For services to Education. (London, E12)
- Iain Smith, Producer. For services to the Film Industry. (Iver, Buckinghamshire)
- Robert Graham Smith, Senior Vice-President, External and Environmental Affairs, Toyota Motor Europe. For services to the Automotive Industry. (Horsham, West Sussex)
- Dr Stuart Hugh Somerville, Head, Farm Business Services Group, Scottish Agricultural College. For services to the Agricultural Industry in Scotland. (Lanark, Lanarkshire)
- Professor Geoffrey Southworth, Deputy Chief Executive and Strategic Director for Research and Policy, National College for School Leadership. For services to Education. (Cambridge, Cambridgeshire)
- Rosemary Anne Squire, Co-Founder and Joint Chief Executive, Ambassador Theatre Group. For services to Theatre. (West Byfleet, Surrey)
- Dr David Robert Steel, Chief Executive, NHS Quality Improvement Scotland. For services to Healthcare. (Edinburgh)
- Roger Francis Stokes, Lately Senior Scientific Officer, QinetiQ. For services to the Armed Forces. (Farnborough, Hampshire)
- Dr Richard Harry Brooke Sturt, Lately Chair, Consumer Council for Water (Southern). For services to the Water Industry. (Deal, Kent)
- Robert Hedley Sykes, Lately Chief Executive, Worcestershire County Council. For services to Local Government. (Malvern, Worcestershire)
- The Reverend Paul Symonds, For services to Community Relations in Northern Ireland. (Newtownabbey, Antrim)
- Ian Talbot, Lately Artistic Director, Open Air Theatre in Regent's Park. For services to Drama. (London, SW18)
- Evelyn May Taylor, For services to Aromatherapy and to the Beauty Industry. (Peterborough, Cambridgeshire)
- Gordon Alexander Taylor, Chief Executive, Professional Footballers' Association. For services to Sport. (Nr Clitheroe, Lancashire)
- Professor Andrew James Thomson, Lately Dean, Faculty of Science, University of East Anglia. For services to Higher Education. (Norwich, Norfolk)
- Barbara Thorndick, Chief Executive, West Kent Housing Association. For services to Social Housing. (London, NW5)
- George David Thornton, Chair, Lake District National Park Authority. For services to the Environment. (Windermere, Cumbria)
- John Keith Thorpe, Grade 7, Cities and Urban Policy Division, Department for Communities and Local Government. (London, N2)
- Janice Tracey, Chief Executive, Londonderry Chamber of Commerce and Member, Northern Ireland Higher Education Council. For services to the Economy and to Education. (Claudy, Londonderry)
- Andrew Stewart Trotter, QPM Deputy Chief Constable, British Transport Police. For services to the Police. (Tonbridge, Kent)
- Professor Margaret Ann Tucker, Lately Dean and Head of the School of Nursing and Midwifery Studies, Cardiff University. For services to Healthcare. (Cowbridge, The Vale of Glamorgan)
- Dr Ian Paul Tunbridge, Executive Director, Combined Universities in Cornwall and lately Dean, University of Plymouth Colleges. For services to Higher Education. (Liskeard, Cornwall)
- Jennifer Sheila Uglow, Biographer and Editorial Director, Chatto and Windus. For services to Literature and to Publishing. (Canterbury, Kent)
- Patricia Mollie Valerie Valler, For services to the Women's Section, The Royal British Legion. (Southsea, Hampshire)
- Peter Vansittart, Author. For services to Literature. (Suffolk)
- Kashaf Walayat, Head of Service Improvement and Operations, Chief Information Officers Group, Department for Children, Schools and Families. (Sheffield, South Yorkshire)
- Alan James Walker, Finance Director, Jaguar Cars. For services to the Automotive Industry and to Disadvantaged People in Merseyside. (Chester, Cheshire)
- Professor James Walvin, Emeritus Professor of History, University of York. For services to Scholarship. (York, North Yorkshire)
- Brian Wareham, For services to Crimestoppers. (Winchester, Hampshire)
- Professor Kasturi Arachchi Ariya Saman Warnakulasuriya, Professor of Oral Medicine and Experimental Oral Pathology, King's College London, Guy's, King's and St Thomas' Hospitals, London. For services to Medicine. (Wallington, Surrey)
- Laura Theresa Warren, DL, For services to the voluntary sector in Essex. (Burnham-on-Crouch, Essex)
- Michael Roy Waterland, Chair, Portsmouth Hospitals NHS Trust. For services to Healthcare in the West Midlands and the South East. (Fareham, Hampshire)
- Nicholas Bruce Watson, Justices' Clerk, Leicestershire and Rutland, HM Courts Service. (Leicestershire)
- Alison Jane Watt, Artist. For services to Art. (Edinburgh)
- Graham Clive Watts, Chief Executive, Construction Industry Council. For services to the Construction Industry. (London, N11)
- Katherine Margaret Welch, Chief Executive, Acumen Community Enterprise Development Trust. For services to Social Enterprise in the North East. (Chester le Street, Durham)
- David Whitman, Corporate Services Manager, Jobcentre Plus, Department for Work and Pensions. (Sheffield, South Yorkshire)
- Roy Malcolm Wicks, Director-General, South Yorkshire Passenger Transport Executive. For services to Public Transport. (Barnsley, South Yorkshire)
- Councillor David John Wilcox, Member, Derbyshire County Council. For services to Local Government. (Tintwistle, Derbyshire)
- Dr William Edward Wilkins, Clinical Director of Integrated Medicine and Consultant Physician, Bro Morgannwg NHS Trust. For services to the NHS in Wales. (Bridgend, Mid Glamorgan)
- John Wilson, Director of Education, East Renfrewshire. For services to Education. (Killearn, Stirling and Falkirk)
- Michael Gregg Wilson, Producer and Photographic Collector. For services to the Film Industry. (London, W1J)
- Robert Primrose Wilson, For charitable services through the Willow Foundation. (Christchurch, Dorset)
- Sarah Wood, Senior Case Director, HM Revenue and Customs. (Heathfield, East Sussex)
- Malcolm Wright, For services to the NHS in Scotland. (Edinburgh)
- Adrian Roger Wyatt, Chief Executive, Quintain Estates and Development plc and Founder, Investment Property Forum. For services to the Property Industry. (Buntingford, Hertfordshire)
- Callton Lloyd Young, Department for Environment, Food and Rural Affairs, Director of Sustainability and Competitiveness, Food and Drink Federation. (Purley, Surrey)

==== Members of the Order of the British Empire (MBE) ====
- Wendy Abbs, lately Duty Clerk, Prime Minister's Office.
- Leslie Adams. For services to Flood Rescue.
- Maureen Anne Ainsley, Chair, Battle Museum of Local History. For services to the community in Battle, East Sussex.
- Kathleen Susan Aldom, Founder, Paul's Place. For services to young disabled people in South Gloucestershire.
- Helene Esther Alexander, Director and Curator, The Fan Museum. For services to Arts and Crafts.
- Geoffrey Allen. For services to the community in Bromley, Kent.
- John Hernaman Allen, Chair of Governors, Bury Church of England High School, Lancashire. For services to Education.
- Kathleen Allen. For services to the community in Bromley, Kent.
- Lorraine Allen, Head, Cornwall and Scilly European Objective 1 Programme, Government Office for the South West, Department for Children, Schools and Families.
- Katherine Fiona Allenby, lately Chair, British Athletes Commission. For services to Sport.
- Professor Subhash Anand, Professor of Technical Textiles, University of Bolton. For services to Higher Education and to the Textiles Industry.
- Ian Scott Anderson. For services to Music.
- Janet Edith Anderson, lately Chair, Early Years Development and Childcare Partnership, Kingston-upon-Hull. For services to Children and Families.
- Pauline Annan, Quality Manager, Social Security and Child Support Appeals Tribunal, Ministry of Justice.
- Keith Asbury, Liaison Officer, The Duke of Edinburgh's Award, Nuneaton, Bedworth and North Warwickshire. For services to Young People.
- William Brian Ashton, Head Coach, England rugby union team. For services to Sport.
- Keith Anthony Atkins, Headteacher, Gors Community School, Townhill, Swansea. For services to Education in Wales.
- Freddie Bacchus, lately Health Care Support Worker, The Queen Elizabeth Hospital King's Lynn Trust. For services to the NHS.
- Daniel Bailey, Craftsman, National Grid. For services to Flood Rescue.
- Susan Mary Bainbridge, lately Headteacher, Colleges Nursery School, Cambridge and Member, ReFocus Board, Sightlines Initiative. For services to Early Years Education.
- Dr Ian Alfred Baker. For services to the Britain-Nepal Medical Trust.
- Councillor Tamsy Baker, Member, Guildford Borough Council. For services to Local Government and to Vulnerable People.
- Kiran Bali, J.P., Director, Yorkshire and Humber Faiths Forum. For services to Community Relations in West Yorkshire.
- Louise Banham, Licence Reception Supervisor, European World Trade Directorate, Department for Business, Enterprise and Regulatory Reform.
- Richard Jonothan Barber. For services to the community and to the Tourist Industry in South Wales.
- Roy Barker, Vice-Chair, Zetland Lifeboat Museum, Royal National Lifeboat Institution. For services to Maritime Safety.
- Cornell Roxroy Crofton Barnes, Constable, West Midlands Police. For services to the Police.
- Dr Roy James Campbell Barry. For charitable services to Christian Aid.
- Vivienne Linda Bateson, Administrative Assistant, Jobcentre Plus, Department for Work and Pensions.
- Margaret Beard. For services to Libraries in North Staffordshire.
- Frances Elizabeth Beatty, J.P., lately Regional Director, Country Land and Business Association. For services to Business in the West Midlands.
- George Edwin Beecham. For services to the community in Canvey Island, Essex.
- Kevin John Behan, Director and Chair, Barnstaple Musical Comedy and Dramatic Society for Young People, Devon.
- Caroline Elizabeth Benbrook, J.P., Senior Officer, London and Anglia Compliance, Chelmsford, H.M. Revenue and Customs.
- Ursula Bennett, Head of Dentistry, Tower Hamlets, London. For services to Dentistry.
- Joan Berman. For services to People with Learning Disabilities in Eastern England.
- Monica Joyce Berwick. For services to the community in Ashford, Kent.
- Jacqueline Best, Administrative Officer, Regions Directorate, Department for Business, Enterprise and Regulatory Reform.
- Dr Anna Thevarthundiyil Thomas-Betts, Senior Lecturer and College Tutor, Imperial College London. For services to the community and Education.
- Paul Andrew Bevand, Executive Officer, Jobcentre Plus, Department for Work and Pensions.
- Paul Anthony Bielby, Founder, Master Skills Football Academy, Darlington. For services to Young People and Children in County Durham.
- David Hugh William Blacker. For services to Blackpool Boys' and Girls' Club.
- Robert Ashley Blackman, lately Head of Senior Management and Overseas Liaison Section, Home Office.
- Cynthia Anne Blake. For services to the Scouts in Watford, Hertfordshire.
- Norman Blake. For services to the Scouts in Watford, Hertfordshire.
- Valerie Bloom. For services to Poetry.
- Roger Blundell. For services to the Construction Industry.
- Terence Bond, Probation Officer, HM Prison Lancaster. For public service.
- Stanley William Booth. For public service.
- Ephraim Joseph Borowski. For services on behalf of the Jewish Community in Scotland.
- Patricia Bowles. For services to the community in Lincolnshire.
- Susan Bowman, Board Director, Clapham Park New Deal for Communities. For services to the community in Lambeth, London.
- Adrian Charles Bowrey, External and Government Affairs Executive, West of England Aerospace Forum. For services to the Aerospace Industry.
- Councillor David Charles Bradford. For services to the community in Norwich.
- David John Bradley. For services to Young People through the Duke of Edinburgh's Award in Altrincham, Cheshire.
- Martin Bradley, lately Vice-Chairman, Arts Council of Northern Ireland. For services to the Arts.
- David Bradshaw, Construction Operatives Instructor, H.M. Prison Hewell Grange, Redditch, Worcestershire. For services to Training.
- Douglas Braidwood, J.P. For services to the Royal British Legion Scotland in Perthshire.
- Robert John Bright, Council Member and Director, Skillfast-UK. For services to Training.
- Janet Ann Brightwell, Personal Secretary, Medical Research Council's Laboratory of Molecular Biology. For services to the Administration of Science.
- Timothy David Alexander Brigstocke, lately Chair, Royal Association for British Dairy Farmers. For services to the Dairy Industry.
- Rosemary Jean Elizabeth Brittain, lately Principal, Dundonald Primary School. For services to Education in Northern Ireland.
- Malcolm Arthur Broad, Community Governor, Patchway Community College and Governor, Portway Community School, Bristol. For services to Education.
- Raymond Brothwood. For services to the community in Sandwell, West Midlands.
- Douglas Gordon Stafford Brown. For charitable services in West London.
- Frederick John Brown. For services to St. John Ambulance Brigade in Devon.
- Gary Brown, Sergeant, Lincolnshire Police Force. For services to the Police.
- Kathleen Esther Bryan, Chair, Inner London Scope, Norwest Group. For services to disabled people in North London.
- Geoffrey David Budd, lately Company Secretary, DSG international plc. For services to the Retail Industry and to Better Regulation.
- Alexander Bulloch. For services to the Birmingham War Research Society.
- Antoni Burakowski, Designer and Photographer. For services to the Fashion Industry.
- Clive Patrick Burke, Executive Officer, Jobcentre Plus, Department for Work and Pensions.
- Richard Leslie Burnett, Concert Pianist and Founder, Finchcocks Museum of Early Music, Goudhurst, Kent. For services to Music.
- Rosalee Minalva Butler, Ward Sister, Sandwell and West Birmingham Hospitals NHS Trust. For services to Nursing.
- John Leslie Harold Butterworth, Editor, Shrewsbury and North Shropshire Chronicles. For services to Journalism and to Charity.
- Jean Byers. For services to the League of Friends of the Kent and Canterbury Hospital.
- David Kenneth Campbell, Area Operations Manager for South London, London Ambulance Service NHS Trust. For services to the NHS.
- Michael David Colin Craven Campbell, D.L. For charitable services.
- William John Allison Campbell. For services to the community in Wigtownshire.
- Victor Card, lately Head of Engineering, Civil Aviation Authority. For services to the Aviation Industry.
- Helen Carpenter, Project Co-ordinator, Welcome to Your Library. For services to Local Government.
- Kathleen Carr, Catering Supervisor, House of Commons.
- Mary Cassidy, Senior Executive Officer, Disability and Carers' Service, Department for Work and Pensions.
- Ann Patricia Chambers, Sure Start Operations Manager and Deputy Chief Executive, Howgill Family Centre, Whitehaven. For services to Children and Families in Cumbria.
- Annie Elizabeth Chambers, Chair, Mourne Hospice Support Group. For charitable services.
- Peter Chambers. For services to the Scouts in Sheffield.
- Dr Debjani Chatterjee, Poet and Author. For services to Literature.
- Gillian Cheeseman, lately Administration Manager, Central Science Laboratory, Department for Environment, Food and Rural Affairs.
- Peter Cheng, Nurse and Clinical Risk Manager, North Essex Mental Health Partnership. For services to Healthcare.
- Francis John Clegg, Acting General Manager, Translink Bus Services. For services to Public Transport in Northern Ireland.
- William Clement. For services to Piping and to Scottish Country Dancing.
- Mamie Wallace Clugston, Welfare Officer, Personnel and Central Support Division, Department for Enterprise, Trade and Investment, Northern Ireland Executive.
- Fred Cobain, M.L.A. For public service in Northern Ireland.
- Joy Cochrane. For services to Hockey in Essex.
- Mavis Coggings, Administrative Assistant, Cheque Processing Unit, Shipley, H.M. Revenue and Customs.
- Susan Mary Cole. For services to the Girl Guides in Northamptonshire.
- Garth Collard. For services to the Linton and District History Society, Cambridge.
- Evelyn Ann Collins, Director, Shopmobility Belfast and Chair, Shopmobility Northern Ireland. For services to disabled people.
- John Wilfred Collis, Support Grade 6, Serious Organised Crime Agency, Home Office. Alexander McKenzie Condie. For services to Social Housing in Fife.
- David Cook, Chief Executive, Kettering Borough Council. For services to Local Government.
- Gladys Copeland. For services to the Credit Union Movement in Northern Ireland.
- Cynthia Meryl Cormack. For services to Child Healthcare in South Africa.
- Norman Stansfield Cornish. For services to Art in the North East.
- Lilian Counsell, Office Manager, Lancashire County Council. For services to the community in Preston.
- Herbert Coutts, lately Director of Culture and Leisure, Edinburgh City Council. For services to the Arts and Recreation.
- Beverley Ann Cox. For services to Hairdressing.
- Damian St George Cranmer, lately Director of Music, Guildhall School of Music & Drama. For services to Music Education.
- Stella Critchely. For services to Ashford Youth Theatre, Kent.
- Vivien Margaret Crouch, School Nurse. For services to Healthcare in Bath.
- Patricia Juliette Culling, Grade C1, Ministry of Defence.
- James Currie, J.P. For services to the community in Muirkirk, East Ayrshire.
- James Wilson Currie. For services to Economic Development and to Young People through the Every Boy's Rally in Northern Ireland.
- Douglas James Dailey, Logistics Manager, British Cycling Federation. For services to Sport.
- Euton Daley, Artistic Director and Chief Executive, Pegasus Theatre, Oxford. For services to the Arts.
- John Timothy Dallimore. For services to Heritage in Somerset.
- Sheila Davidson, Chief Executive, The Bridge Project. For services to Women in Washington, Tyne and Wear.
- Alun Davies, Chair, National Forum for Organisations of Disabled People. For services to disabled people.
- John Hughes Davies. For services to the community in Pumsaint, Carmarthenshire.
- John Ingram Davies. For services to War Pensioners in Northern Ireland.
- Richard Davies, Founder, OWN IT Scheme, Newcastle upon-Tyne. For services to Disadvantaged Young People.
- Terence Davies. For services to the community in Gorslas, Carmarthenshire.
- The Reverend John James Davis. For services to the community in Staffordshire.
- Reginald Davis. For services to Photography and Charity.
- Dorothy Mary Dawes. For services to Frimley Park Hospital NHS Foundation Trust, Surrey.
- Jennifer Dawson, Executive Officer, Head of the Correspondence Unit, Highways Agency, Department for Transport.
- Raymond Kerry de Courcy, Chairman and Chief Executive, Rye and District Hotels and Caterers Association. For services to the Hospitality Industry.
- Julia, Lady de Waal. For services to the community in Westminster, London.
- Sarah Louise Derbyshire (Mrs Drew), Executive Director, Live Music Now. For services to Music.
- Edward Victor Deverson, Head of Division, Estates and Facilities, Babraham Institute, Cambridge. For services to Science.
- Gurbachan Singh Dhinsa, Vice-Chair, Greets Green New Deal for Communities. For services to the community in Sandwell, West Midlands.
- Melrose Gordon Diack. For services to Disadvantaged Young People in Ribble Valley, Lancashire.
- Margaret Diamond, Radiographer, Wishaw General Hospital, Lanarkshire. For services to the NHS.
- Horace Stanley Dilley. For services to the community in Biggleswade, Bedfordshire.
- Alan John Dixon, Grade C1, Ministry of Defence.
- Austen Mark Dixon. For services to Coastal Defences in East Anglia.
- Norman Dodds. For services to Pipe Band Music in Northern Ireland.
- Errol Douglas. For services to Hairdressing.
- William James Dowdall. For services to Thornhill New Deal for Communities Health and Wellbeing Project, Southampton.
- Raymond Arthur Drayton. For services to the community in Bransholme, East Riding of Yorkshire.
- Mervyn Dunlop. For services to the Cheers Youth Centre, Ballymoney, Northern Ireland.
- Sheila Eden, Occupational Therapist, Tower Hamlets, London. For services to Healthcare.
- Sally Edie, Head of Sports Programmes and Sports Development, University of Surrey. For services to Higher Education and to Sport.
- George Terence Edis, Chair, National Federation of Tenant Management Organisations. For services to the community in Walsall, West Midlands.
- John Stanley Edwards, lately Site Manager, Alverstoke Church of England Junior School, Hampshire. For services to Education.
- Llewelyn Goronwy Edwards, Councillor, Ceredigion County Council. For services to Local Government in West Wales.
- Lynne Edwards, Quilt Maker. For services to Arts and Crafts.
- Francis Egerton, lately Opera Singer. For services to Music.
- Penelope Joan Escombe, D.L. For services to the community in Northamptonshire.
- Eluned Evans. For services to Leukaemia Research and to the community in Carno, Powys.
- Kay Nicolette Evans, J.P. For services to Oxfam.
- Peter Evans, Secretary, Bideford Blues Junior Football Club, Devon. For services to Young People.
- Shirley Ann Evans, lately Home Care Assistant, Berkshire County Council. For services to the community in Slough.
- Terry Everett, Trading Standards Officer, Borough of Thurrock. For services to the Plumbing and Heating Industry.
- Yinnon Ezra, Director of Recreation and Heritage, Hampshire County Council. For services to Local Government.
- Denise Fagg. For services to Perth and Kinross Association of Voluntary Service and Crossroads Care.
- Professor Eileen Fairhurst, Chair, Salford Teaching Primary Care Trust. For services to the NHS.
- Brian Michael Faller, Chair, Barnet Hospital League of Friends. For charitable services.
- Joyce Fann, School Welfare Supervisor, Farnborough Road Junior School, Southport. For services to Education.
- John William Farndon, Fire Control Officer, Derbyshire Fire and Rescue Service. For services to Local Government.
- Jonathon Charles Fenn. For services to Flood Rescue.
- Robert John Fiddaman. For services to Agriculture.
- Valerie Finigan, Midwife, Royal Oldham and North Manchester Hospital, Pennine Acute NHS Hospitals Trust. For services to Healthcare.
- Derek Thomas Flint. For services to the Medical Research Council.
- Michael Flockhart, lately Forensic Engineer, Metropolitan Police Service. For services to the Police.
- Arthur Frederick Francis Flux. For services to the community in Banbury, Oxfordshire.
- Charles James Flynn, Deputy Chief Executive and Chief Operations Officer, Mersey Care NHS Trust. For services to Healthcare in Merseyside.
- Dr Peter John Ford, lately Chief Technician, Department of Physics, University of Bath. For services to Higher Education and to Science.
- Robert Geoffrey Ford, Chair, Ford Component Manufacturing Ltd., and Chair, South Tyneside Enterprise Partnership. For services to Business in the North East.
- Thomas William Fox, lately Special Needs Youth Leader, Derbyshire County Council. For services to Young People.
- Isabella Wilhelmina Crosbie Francis, J.P., lately Administrative Assistant, Ormiston Primary School, East Lothian. For services to Education and to the community in Ormiston.
- John Michael Francis, J.P., Higher Executive Officer, The Pension Service, Department for Work and Pensions.
- Paul Freedman. For charitable services in Essex.
- Felicity French. For services to the Soldiers', Sailors' and Airmen's Families Association in Germany.
- Henry David Friar. For services to the community in Sion Mills, Strabane, Northern Ireland.
- Jean Olive Frost, Manager, Rhyl Lifeboat Souvenir Shop, Royal National Lifeboat Institution. For services to Maritime Safety.
- Mary Fusco, Foyer Manager, Flax Housing Association Limited. For services to Social Housing in Northern Ireland.
- Lesley Gardner. For services to the Hospitality Industry.
- Andrew Philip Garnett, Grade C1, Ministry of Defence.
- Oliver Garnett, Guidebook Editor, National Trust. For services to Heritage.
- Fiona Garrigan, Administrative Officer, Jobcentre Plus, Department for Work and Pensions.
- Peter David Geddes. For services to Industrial Heritage in the Isle of Man.
- Susan Geddes (Mrs. Bullock), lately Grade B1, Prime Minister's Office.
- Anita Margaret George, J.P. For services to the community in Penzance, Cornwall.
- Peter Geoffrey George, Support Staff, Kent Police. For services to the Police.
- Arthur Ellis Gilbert. For charitable services in Burnham-on-Sea, Somerset.
- Helen Mary Josephine Giles. For services to Homeless People in London.
- Barbara Siobhan, Mrs. Gillespie, Probation Officer. For services to the Criminal Justice System in Northern Ireland.
- Dr. Mary Eleanor Gillham. For services to Nature Conservation in South Wales.
- Michael Patrick Gillick, Superintendent, WestMidlands Police. For services to the Police.
- Michael John Godrich. For services to Young People in Swansea.
- David Felton Goldsmith, lately Teacher, Lord Wandsworth College, Hampshire. For services to Education.
- Mark Robert Gorman, Director, Strategic Development, Help Age International. For services to Older People.
- Thomas Alfred Gorringe. For services to the Police in Northern Ireland.
- Hazel Elva Goss, Constable, North Wales Police. For services to the Police.
- The Reverend David Selwoode Graham, Chair, North Eastern Education and Library Board. For services to Education in Northern Ireland.
- Joyce Maxine Grandison. For services to the Women's Health and Family Services and to the community in Newham, London.
- June Lancelyn-Green. For services to the community in Merseyside.
- Dorothy Gregory, lately Headteacher, Walkergate Early Years Centre, Newcastle upon Tyne. For services to Early Years Education.
- Philip William Gregory. For services to the community in Bristol.
- Lionel Griffiths. For services to the Accountancy Profession in South Wales.
- Dr Paul Grout. For services to the Ministry of Defence Search and Rescue Force.
- Christine Marlene Hagen, lately Finance and Development Manager, Newtownards Road Women's Group Ltd. For services to the community in East Belfast.
- Christopher Frederick Haines. For services to Roman History.
- John Hale. For services to the community in the Forest of Dean, Gloucestershire.
- Martin Allan Hall, M.V.O., Director General, Finance & Leasing Association. For services to the Finance Industry.
- Richard Halsey, lately Places of Worship Strategy Manager, English Heritage. For services to Heritage.
- Andy Raphael Thomas Hamilton, Jazz Musician and Teacher. For services to Music in Birmingham.
- David Hamilton. For services to the Bilton Youth Centre, Harrogate.
- James Burns Hamilton, Managing Director, Soundtex Ceilings Ltd. For services to the Construction Industry in Scotland.
- The Reverend David Alan Hands, Bus Driver, Sunderland Depot. For services to Public Transport.
- Gillian Anne Hankey, Director, Bankruptcy Advisory Service Ltd. For services to the Insolvency Profession.
- Christopher George Harding, Chief Executive and Clerk, Norfolk Police Authority. For services to the Police.
- Kenneth Harrison. For services to the community in Liscard, Merseyside.
- Lilian Rose Harrison. For services to the community in Battersea, London.
- (Patrick) Roger Harrison, Secretary and Head Coach, Widnes Schools Rugby League Association. For services to School Sport.
- Ian Harwood, President, The Lute Society. For services to Musical Heritage.
- Eileen Haskins. For services to the community in North Wales and to the Welsh Amateur Athletic Association.
- Patricia Ann Hawkes, Chair, Brighton and Hove Children and Young People's Trust. For public service.
- Joan Haxby, Keep Fit Teacher. For services to Physical Fitness in Kent.
- Margaret Hayward. For services to the National Back Pain Association.
- Ann Elizabeth Head, Social Worker and Children's Guardian. For services to Children and Families.
- Elaine Evelyn, Mrs. Heal, Catering Manager, Teignmouth Community College, Devon. For services to Education.
- Richard John Hebditch. For services to Sport and to the community in Taunton, Somerset.
- Dorothy Ann Rebecca Hegarty. For services to Deaf People in Northern Ireland.
- Annette Hellyer, Manager, Devonport Warrant Officer and Senior Rates Mess, Eurest Support Services. For services to the Armed Forces.
- Judy Hemsley. For services to Children with Special Needs.
- Ralph Henderson, Deputy Headteacher, William Edwards School and Sports College, Essex. For services to Education.
- Paul Harvey Hendry, Customer Services Manager, Sheffield Group, Valuation Office Agency, H.M. Revenue and Customs.
- Dominic Henry, Senior Education Officer, Northern Ireland Office.
- Councillor Patrick Joseph Henry. For public service and for services to the community in Haywards Heath, West Sussex.
- Mary Hernon, Executive Officer, Jobcentre Plus, Department for Work and Pensions.
- Michael Herriot, Emergency Planning General Manager, Scottish Ambulance Service. For services to Healthcare.
- John Samuel Hewlett. For services to the Royal British Legion in Worcester.
- Barbara Hayhurst Heys. For charitable services in North Wales.
- Dr Mary Ursula Hickey, General Medical Practitioner, Westminster, London. For services to Healthcare.
- John Higgins. For services to Snooker.
- Dr Roger Hill, Technical Specialist, SELEX Sensors and Airborne Systems. For services to the Defence Industry.
- Geoffrey Hirst, Central Services Manager, Kirklees Metropolitan Council. For services to Local Government.
- Pauline Hoath, Administration Officer, H.M. Young Offenders' Institution, Wetherby, West Yorkshire.
- Alan Hodgkinson. For services to Football.
- Margaret-Anne Hodson, Chair, Riding for the Disabled Warfield Group. For services to Disability Sport in the Southern Region.
- Victoria Frances Holcroft, Project Director, Oxford Radcliffe Hospitals NHS Trust. For services to the NHS.
- Frank Hont, Regional Secretary, UNISON. For services to Community Relations in the North West.
- Aminul Hoque. For services to Youth Justice in East London.
- Stephen Horlock, Bereavement Services Manager, Woodvale Crematorium, Brighton. For services to Local Government.
- Graham Houghton, District Manager, Lambeth, Southwark and Wandsworth District Jobcentre Plus, Department for Work and Pensions.
- Brian Joseph Houston. For services to the Construction Industry.
- Michael George Howe, Station Manager (Retained), Shropshire Fire and Rescue Service. For services to Local Government.
- Lesley Howell, Grade D, Ministry of Defence. Goronwy Wyn Howells. For services to Amgueddfa Cymru (National Museum Wales).
- James Gareth Morris Howells, Boxing Coach. For services to Young People in Llanelli, Carmarthenshire.
- Norah Hoyles. For services to the community in Garstang, Lancashire.
- Renee Herkes Hub. For services to the League of Friends, South Tyneside NHS Foundation Trust.
- Sara Angela Hughes, Grade C1, Ministry of Defence.
- Therese Hughes, Hairdresser, Macmillan Support and Information Centre, Belfast City Hospital. For services to Healthcare.
- Professor Christine Helen Humfrey, J.P., Director, International Office, University of Nottingham. For services to Higher Education, Science and Regional Development.
- Brian Andrew Humpherson. For services to Music Education in Leicestershire.
- Mahroof Hussain, J.P., Cabinet Member for Communities and Involvement, Rotherham Metropolitan Borough Council. For services to Local Government.
- George Derek Ibbotson. For services to Athletics.
- Brenda Ince. For services to Football in Cambridgeshire.
- Annie Henderson Inglis. For services to Drama in Aberdeen and in the North East of Scotland.
- Bushra Iqbal, Head of Strategy and Policy Development, West of Scotland Racial Equality Council. For services to Community Relations in Strathclyde.
- Dr Cyril Isenberg. For services to Physics.
- Valerie Preston Ives. For services to Heritage in Leeds.
- Audrey Gail Jamieson, Manager, RAF Boulmer Nursery School. For services to Education.
- Talat Javed, lately Teacher of Urdu, South Birmingham College. For services to Further Education.
- Wendy Jane Jeffs. For services to Healthcare in Wales.
- The Reverend Milton Cosmas Job. For services to Education in London.
- Sukhbinder Johal, Chief Executive, Culture East Midlands. For services to the Arts.
- Thomas William Johnston, J.P. For services to Economic Regeneration and to the community in Armagh, Northern Ireland.
- Ann Elizabeth Trevor-Jones. For services to the National Garden Scheme and to the community in Shropshire.
- David Brian Jones. For services to the Food Wholesale Industry in South Wales.
- David Edward Picton Jones. For services to the Poultry Breeding Industry in Wales.
- Jeanne Anne Jones, J.P. For services to the Administration of Justice in Greater Manchester.
- Mair Lloyd Jones, J.P. For services to the community in Solihull, West Midlands.
- Mary Jones, Nurse, Bro Morgannwg NHS Trust. For services to Healthcare in Wales.
- Paul Jones, Gas Distribution Standby Operations Engineer, National Grid. For services to Flood Rescue.
- Sian Jones, Headteacher, Duffryn Infant School. For services to Education in South Wales.
- Councillor Sidney Kallar. For services to Local Government and to the community in Barking and Dagenham.
- Joan Kane, Caseworker, West Yorkshire, Crown Prosecution Service.
- Elizabeth Mary Varley Keatinge, Founder Trustee, Institute of Tourist Guiding. For services to the Tourist Industry.
- Peter John Edward Keeble, Director Support Services, Joint Services Command and Staff College, Serco Defence Science and Technology. For services to the Defence Industry.
- John Joseph Anthony Kelly, County Emergency Planning Officer, Oxfordshire County Council. For services to Local Government.
- Philip Thomas Kemball, Secretary to the Buncefield Board of Investigation, Health and Safety Executive, Department for Work and Pensions.
- Thomas Joseph Keogan, Consultant for Deaf Services, Darlington Borough Council. For services to Deaf People.
- John Kerr, Workshop Supervisor, Forensic Science Northern Ireland, Northern Ireland Office.
- Professor Brian Kerry, Head of Nematode Interactions Unit, Rothamsted Research. For services to Science.
- Robert Key, Executive Director, Elton John AIDS Foundation UK. For charitable services.
- Dr Pradeep Balbir Khanna, Consultant Physician, Care of the Elderly and Chief of Staff for Community Services, Gwent Healthcare NHS Trust. For services to Medicine.
- Nichola Kirkham, Special Constable. For services to the Police and to the community in South Yorkshire.
- Phillip Kissi, Higher Executive Officer, Jobcentre Plus, Department for Work and Pensions.
- Chris Knight, Business Support, Budget Co-ordination Team, H.M. Treasury.
- Judith Knight, Co-Founder and Director, Artsadmin. For services to the Arts.
- Arti Kumar, Associate Director, Centre for Excellence in Teaching and Learning, University of Bedfordshire. For services to Higher Education.
- Elizabeth Kwantes. For services to the community in Cookham, Berkshire.
- Glyn Murray Kyle. For services to the community in South London.
- Alan Lancaster. For services to Shaw Cross Club for Young People, Dewsbury, West Yorkshire.
- Barbara Jane Lancaster, Chair, City of Leeds Swim Club. For services to Sport.
- David Lathrope, Chair, Libraries and Information, East Midlands Inspire Working Group. For services to Local Government.
- Danny James Lavender, Higher Officer, London Compliance Office, South East, H.M. Revenue and Customs.
- Christine Vera Lazenby, lately Typist and Administrative Assistant, Government Office for Yorkshire and the Humber, Department for Communities and Local Government.
- Jane Le Baigue, lately Non-Executive Director, Bromley Primary Care Trust. For services to the NHS.
- Michael Andrew Lee. Power System Manager, National Grid. For services to Flood Rescue.
- Enid Mae Levin, lately Practice Development Manager, Social Care Institute for Excellence. For services to Social Care.
- Janet Carole Lewis, Founder and Director, English Youth Ballet. For services to Dance.
- Alan Lindsley. For services to the Sunderland Branch of the Multiple Sclerosis Society.
- Sandy Lines, Chair, United Norwich Kidney Patients' Association. For charitable services.
- Barry Ronald Littlewood, lately Chief Executive, Coventry Transport Museum. For services to Heritage.
- Gill Lloyd, Director, Artsadmin. For services to the Arts.
- Valerie Jane Lobban. For services to the community in Edinburgh.
- John Michael Locke, Chair and Secretary, Newport and District Friends of Cancer Research UK. For charitable services.
- Susan Elizabeth Sida-Lockett. For services to Regional and Local Government in Suffolk.
- Christopher James Longley. For services to the community in Yorkshire and Humber.
- Dr. Steven John Luke, Director, Arup (Wales Group). For services to Business and to the community in Wales.
- Gary Lumby, Head of Retail and Small Business Banking, Yorkshire Bank. For services to the Finance Industry.
- Lorna Helen Lumsden. For services to the community in Applecross, Ross-shire.
- Anthony Lynn. For services to the community in Saltburn-by-the-Sea, Redcar and Cleveland.
- Dr John William Alexander MacDonald, General Medical Practitioner. For services to Healthcare in the South West of Scotland.
- Henry Craig Madill. For services to Maritime Heritage in Northern Ireland.
- Donald Alexander Main. For services to the Accountancy Profession in Scotland.
- Dr. Abdul Bary Malik, J.P. For services to the Ethnic Minority Community in Bradford, West Yorkshire.
- Ranjan Dhirendra Manek. For services to Older Asian People in Coventry.
- Paul George Manning. For services to Sport and to Young People in Cornwall.
- Rhona Lesley Marshall. For charitable services in Uganda.
- Anita Susan Marsland, Executive Director of Health and Social Care, Knowsley Council and Chief Executive, Knowsley Primary Care Trust. For services to Health and Social Care.
- Christine Joyce Martyn, J.P. For services to the Administration of Justice in Cornwall.
- Frank Marven. For services to the community in Gravesend, Kent.
- Yvonne Mathias. For services to Music in North Wales.
- Bajrang Bahadur Mathur, Chair, Hillingdon Carers. For services to the community in Hillingdon, London.
- Jacqueline Yvonne Matthews. For services to the Louise Brown Yorkshire Ballet Scholarship Centre.
- Lynda Mary Matthews, Facilities Office Services Messenger, Welsh Assembly Government.
- George Mawhinney. For services to the Scouts in Northern Ireland.
- Maureen Rosemary May, Teaching Assistant, Slade Green Infant School, Bexley, Kent. For services to Education.
- Elizabeth Mary McCauley. For services to the Royal British Legion.
- Janet McCauslin, Assistant Principal, Lauder College. For services to Further Education in Fife.
- Colin McDowell, Author and Journalist. For services to the Fashion Industry.
- William Greer McDowell. For charitable services in Northern Ireland.
- Ronald Joseph McFall. For services to Football and to the community in Northern Ireland.
- George Hugh Patrick McGuinness. For services to the community in Glasgow.
- Thelma McGuire, Occupational Health Adviser. For services to the NHS in Scotland.
- Yvette McHugh. For services to Children and to the community in Dunnington, York.
- David McInally, lately Services Supervisor, University of Paisley. For services to Higher Education.
- James McIntyre, Administrative Assistant, Accounts Office, Cumbernauld, H.M. Revenue and Customs.
- Nancy Walker Young McIntyre, Jupiter Nursery Manager, Falkirk. For services to Conservation and to the Environment.
- Ann Catherine McKerracher. For services to Older People and to the community of Tong on the Isle of Lewis.
- Brigid McLaughlin, latelyWard Sister, Altnagelvin Hospital, Londonderry. For services to Healthcare in Northern Ireland.
- Thomas McLoughlin. For services to the Irish Community in Leeds, West Yorkshire.
- Anne Rossiter McMurray, Managing Director, Anne McMurray Consulting Ltd. For services to Women's Entrepreneurship in Northern Ireland.
- Kenneth Melsom, J.P., Chair of the corporation, Hastings College. For services to Further Education.
- Diana June Middleton, J.P. For charitable services.
- Dr Robert Middleton. For services to the community in the East Midlands.
- Martin Mills, Founder and Chair, Beggars Group. For services to the Music Industry.
- Commander Ivor George Milne, R.N. Retd., Grade C2, Ministry of Defence.
- Anna Elizabeth Milner. For services to the community in Looe, Cornwall.
- Lilian Mina, Chairman, Royal Hall Restoration Trust. For services to the community in Harrogate, North Yorkshire.
- Ann Leslie Mitchell, lately County Commissioner, Girlguiding Cambridgeshire East. For services to Young People.
- Lillian Ann Mitchell. For services to the community in Waltham Forest, London.
- Ronald Herbert Mobbs, Project Manager, Eaton Vale Scout and Guide Activity Centre, Norfolk. For services to Young People.
- Comfort Iyabo Amah Momoh, Female Genital Mutilation Public Health Specialist, Guy's and St Thomas' Hospital NHS Foundation Trust. For services to Women's Healthcare.
- Dinah Moon, Deputy Director, Swindon Samaritans. For services to Vulnerable People.
- Judith Ann Moore, lately Activities Organiser, Greater Manchester and Cheshire Branch, National Association of gifted children. For services to Education.
- Carol Mary Morgan, J.P. For services to the community in Caerphilly, South Wales.
- Robert Harry Morgan. For services to Brass Band Music.
- Norman Morlidge, J.P. For services to the Administration of Justice and H.M. Prison Service in Lancashire.
- Thomas Aran Morris, Vice-President, Borth Lifeboat Station, Royal National Lifeboat Institution. For services to Maritime Safety in Mid-Wales.
- Kenneth Morrison, Senior Executive Officer, The Pension Service, Department for Work and Pensions.
- Joan Morton. For services to the community in Huddersfield, West Yorkshire.
- William Trevor Moses. For services to Business and to the Dover Counselling Centre in Kent.
- Marion Mullen. For services to the Soldiers', Sailors' and Airmen's Families Association in Tyne and Wear.
- Olive Mulley. For services to the Girl Guides in Buckinghamshire.
- June Mullins, Administrative Assistant, Global Funds and Development Finance Institutions, Department for International Development.
- Thomas Murray. For services to the community in Wigtownshire.
- Alexander Naylor. For services to Athletics.
- Caroline Grant Naylor, J.P. For services to the WRVS and to the community in Leeds.
- Doreen Nevard. For services to the Sea Cadet Corps in Southwark, London.
- Penelope Moyra, Lady Newall. For services to the British Red Cross Society in London.
- Bernadette, Mrs. Newing. For services to the community in Gorton and Abbey Hey, Manchester.
- Norman Brian Newman. For services to the community in Saffron Walden, Essex.
- David Edison Newton, Fire Fighter, Lancashire Fire and Rescue Service. For services to Local Government.
- Phillip Nicholson, Head of Network Operations, E.ON Central Networks. For services to Flood Rescue.
- Barbara Norris. For services to the community in Wirral.
- Stanley Reginald Norris. For services to Young People in Ogmore Valley, Bridgend.
- John O'Dowd, Quality Improvement Officer, North Lanarkshire Council. For services to Education.
- Rose-Ann O'Malley, Founder, Talking Hands Organisation. For services to Deaf People.
- John O'Sullivan, Communications Adviser, Cabinet Office.
- John Charles Howard Oaker, lately Deputy Headteacher, Alumwell Junior School, Walsall. For services to Education.
- Leslie Charles Oakley. For services to People with Myositis.
- The Reverend Nims Onimim Loloba Obunge. For services to Community Relations in Tottenham, London.
- Carole Ogden, lately Personal Assistant, NHS North West. For services to the Community and the NHS.
- Chief Dennis Okocha. For services to the community of Stonebridge, London.
- Anthony Keith Oliver. For services to the community in Wimborne, Dorset.
- Kenneth James Orgill, Head of Support Services, University of Birmingham. For services to Higher Education.
- Frances Roberta Orr, Executive Officer, Royal Ulster Constabulary George Cross Foundation, Northern Ireland Office.
- Linda Orr. For services to the Rehabilitation of Young Offenders in Fife.
- Randolph Alan Otter, Chief Inspector, British Transport Police. For services to the Police.
- Mabel Paget. For services to Chirk Fundraising Committee, Cancer Research UK (Cymru).
- Captain Tracey Palmer, Salvation Army Officer. For services to Flood Rescue in Worksop, Nottinghamshire.
- Aileen, Lady Dodds-Parker. For services to Young People through the Fairbridge Society.
- Anne Christine Parry, Volunteer Assistant, Camelsdale First School, Haslemere, Surrey. For services to Education.
- Peter Passam. For services to Education in Hackney, London.
- Harold Patterson, J.P. For services to Young People and to the community in Lisburn, Northern Ireland.
- Hugh Pattrick, Family Court Adviser, Children and Families Court Advisory and Support Services Wales Cymru, Welsh Assembly Government.
- Christine Peacock, Higher Executive Officer, Disability and Carers' Service, Department for Work and Pensions.
- Sister Theresa Joseph Pegus, Assistant Roman Catholic Chaplain, H.M. Prison Glen Parva, Leicester.
- Joseph Allen Pendleton. For services to People with Chronic Pain in Merseyside.
- Mary Jane Penford. For services to the community in Mansfield, Nottinghamshire.
- Mary Penny. For services to Gymnastics and to Young People in Caerphilly.
- Neil Anthony Pepper, Night Safety Adviser, Tube Lines. For services to the Community and London Underground.
- David Pinchin. For services to the Independent Monitoring Board, H.M. Prison Belmarsh, London.
- Abila Pointing. For services to Community Relations in Liverpool and Manchester.
- Muriel Poisson. For charitable services in Jersey.
- Carole Joan Pollard, Senior Executive Officer, Jobcentre Plus, Department for Work and Pensions.
- Marcel Jacabus Pooke, Chair, Association of Chief Chiropody Officers. For services to Healthcare.
- Alan Robert Potter, lately Chief Executive, Institute of Biomedical Science. For services to Science.
- The Reverend Amy Rose Powell. For services to the community in Wandsworth, London.
- Ivor Verdun Powell, Coach, Team Bath Football Team. For services to Sport.
- Kim Powell, Administrative Officer, The Insolvency Service, Department for Business, Enterprise and Regulatory Reform.
- Olive Jennifer Loder Price. For services to H.M. Prison Blundeston, Suffolk.
- Bronach Priestly, Administrative Officer, Northern Ireland Court Service, Ministry of Justice.
- David Pugh. For services to the Royal Air Forces Association.
- Sandra Gretel Quick, Executive Officer, Jobcentre Plus, Department for Work and Pensions.
- Clive Thornton Radley, Head Coach, Marylebone Cricket Club. For services to Sport.
- Councillor Milan Radulovic, Leader, Broxtowe Borough Council. For services to Local Government in Nottinghamshire.
- Nola Margaret Rae. For services to Drama and to Mime.
- Charles William Rand. For services to Sport in Essex.
- Paul Anthony Randall-Morris, Founder, Cornish Heart Unit Fund. For charitable services.
- Carol Ranyard, J.P. For services to the community in Immingham, Lincolnshire.
- Jane Elizabeth Oakshott-Rastall, Founding Director, York Guilds' Mystery Plays. For services to Community Drama.
- Rajendra Rattan, General Dental Practitioner, Bromley Primary Care Trust. For services to Dentistry.
- Pauline Alexandra Rayner, Chair, Thames Rowing Club. For services to Sport.
- Rachel Rea, Councillor, Larne Borough Council. For services to Local Government in Northern Ireland.
- Councillor Derek Neville Rees, Chair, South Wales Fire and Rescue Service. For services to Local Government.
- Mair Monnington Rees, Manager, Multiple Sclerosis Centre, Cardigan. For charitable services.
- Thelma Margaret Rees. For services to the Veterinary Profession.
- Clovis Reid. For services to Youth Justice in Lambeth, London.
- Simon Rennie, Chief Executive, Central Scotland Forest Trust. For services to the Environment.
- Elizabeth, Mrs Renshaw, Business Manager, Woodchurch High Specialist Engineering College, Wirral. For services to Education.
- Michael Reynolds, lately Director, Sportsmatch. For services to Community Sport.
- Sandra Ann Reynolds, Senior Executive Officer, The Pension Service, Department for Work and Pensions.
- Vernon Garry Rhodes. For services to Bolton Mountain Rescue Team.
- Gaynor Richards, Director, Neath Port Talbot Council for Voluntary Service. For services to the Third Sector.
- John Leslie Riddle, Senior Officer, Debt Management and Banking, H.M. Revenue and Customs, Southend on-Sea.
- Francis John Edmund Rigby. For services to the community in Bolton, Greater Manchester, particularly the Wigan and Leigh Hospice.
- Alison Roberts, Designer and Photographer. For services to the Fashion Industry.
- Harold Michael Roberts, Senior Hovercraft Commander Morecambe Lifeboat Station, Royal National Lifeboat Institution. For services to Maritime Safety.
- Nigel Paul Roberts, Officer-in-Charge, Corwen Fire Station. For services to Local Government and to the community in North Wales.
- George Robinson. For services to the Royal British Legion.
- ~~Philippa Ann Rodale. For services to Animal Welfare and to the community in Dorset.~~
- Thomas Rodgers, Chair, Simon Community Northern Ireland Corporate Committee. For services to Homeless People.
- Jacqueline Rolfe, Welfare Co-ordinator, The Cedars Pupil Referral Unit, Maidstone. For services to Education.
- Elvin Vaughan John Rose, Foster Carer, Salford. For services to Children and Families.
- Jennifer Mary Rose, Foster Carer, Salford. For services to Children and Families.
- Commandant Lynda Diane Rose. For services to the Princess Royal's Volunteer Corps.
- Lieutenant Colonel Martin Paul John Rose, Assistant Director for Army Development, Basic Skills Agency at NIACE. For services to Adult Education.
- Audrey June Rosier, Voluntary Classroom Assistant, Cedar Integrated Primary School. For services to Education in Northern Ireland.
- Kathleen Ross, Dietitian, Royal Aberdeen Children's Hospital. For services to the NHS.
- Sister Mary Ross, lately Clinical Director, Notre Dame Centre. For services to Children and Families in Glasgow.
- Geoffrey Rowlands, Higher Officer, Distributed Processing Wales, West and North West, PAYE/SA Directorate, Chester, H.M. Revenue and Customs.
- Peter Frank Norman Russell, J.P. For services to Brunel University, Middlesex and to the community in Uxbridge.
- Eric Ruthven, Clerical Assistant, Caledonian MacBrayne Ltd., Gourock, Renfrewshire. For services to the community in Dunoon, Argyll.
- June Rutter. For services to Oxfam in Marlow, Buckinghamshire.
- Philip Ryan, Retained Station Manager, Tewkesbury Community Fire Station, Gloucestershire Fire and Rescue Service. For services to Flood Rescue.
- Anthony Garth Sabell, lately Optometrist, Birmingham and Midland Eye Centre, Sandwell and West Birmingham NHS Trust. For services to the NHS.
- Richard Michael Sams, Chair of Governors, the Malling School and Holmesdale Technology College Federation, Kent. For services to Education.
- Jack Sapsworth. For services to the community in Luton, Bedfordshire.
- Alan David Savory. For services to the Independent Park Home Advisory Service.
- Eric Sawyer. For services to the RAF Association in Cheshire.
- Jill Angela Mary Scott, Founder, Scotts Project Trust. For services to Young People with Learning Disabilities in Kent.
- Margaret Scullion, Head, Welfare and Corporate Services, Occupational Health Service, Department of Health, Social Services and Public Safety, Northern Ireland Executive.
- Frederick Edward Seaward, Head Groundsman, All England Tennis and Croquet Club, Wimbledon. For service to Sport.
- Annette Heather Morgan Senior, Emergency Planning Officer, Rotherham Metropolitan Borough Council. For services to Flood Rescue.
- Pamela Joyce Senior, Chair, Bolton Primary Care Trust, Greater Manchester. For services to Healthcare and to the community.
- Brian John Sexton. For services to the Domestic Energy Industry.
- Rose Margaret Shackleford, Administrative Officer, H.M. Revenue and Customs.
- Dr. Ashwin Shah, General Medical Practitioner, Newham, London. For services to Healthcare.
- Victoria Susan Shakesby, Watch Manager, Humberside Fire and Rescue Service. For services to Local Government.
- John Sharman, Lincolnshire County Branch Secretary, Unison. For services to Local Government.
- Andrea Margaret Shaw, Assistant Control Manager, South Yorkshire Fire and Rescue Service. For services to Flood Rescue.
- Barry Shearman, Foster Carer, Cumbria. For services to Children and Families.
- Susan Shearman, Foster Carer, Cumbria. For services to Children and Families.
- David Shelley, Deputy Head of Building, National Trust. For services to Heritage.
- The Reverend Canon Ernest John Heatley Shepherd. For services to the community in Northern Ireland.
- Barry Shooter, Community Pharmacist. For services to Pharmacy.
- Shirley Eva Simpson, Accommodation Manager, Service Delivery Group, Department of Agriculture and Rural Development, Northern Ireland Executive.
- Peter Robert Sindall, Founder, Onward Enterprises. For services to People with Learning Disabilities in Norfolk.
- Malkit Singh. For services to Punjabi Music.
- Brian Smith, Secretary, Association of Scottish Neighbourhood Watches. For services to Community Safety.
- Diane Elizabeth Smith, Hostel Manager, Look Ahead. For services to Homeless People in Westminster, London.
- Graham Ernest Smith, Planning Director of English, Welsh and Scottish Railways. For services to the Rail Freight Industry.
- Dr. John Henry Sandford-Smith. For services to Blind People in Developing Countries.
- Joyce Smith. For services to Arnos Vale Cemetery, Bristol.
- Kristeen Smith. For services to the community in West Stirlingshire.
- Robert Smith, Secretary, Local Government Boundary Commission for Scotland. For services to Local Government.
- Sheila Aynsley-Smith, Director of Student Services, Manchester Metropolitan University. For services to Higher Education.
- Winifred Douglas, Lady Spicer, Vice-President, Weldmar Hospice Trust. For charitable services in West Dorset.
- Beryl Splevins, lately Education Manager, H.M. Prison Frankland, Durham. For services to Education.
- Margaret Wilson Spouse. For services to the community in Duns, Berwickshire.
- Kathleen Muriel Sprague. For services to Coldharbour Working Wool Museum, Devon.
- Jonathan Emmanuel Nii Adja Squire, Convenor, Ethnic Minorities Law Centre Board of Directors. For services to Community Relations in Glasgow.
- William Stanger. For services to the community in Orkney.
- Raymond Kenneth Steadman, General Manager, Number 8 Community Arts Centre. For services to the Arts in Pershore, Worcestershire.
- Dr Christopher Steele, For services to General Medical Practice and to Broadcasting.
- Harold Steer. For services to the community in Portslade, Brighton.
- Stuart Stephenson. For services to Lincolnshire's Lancaster Association.
- William John Stewart, Chef de Mission, Commonwealth Games. For services to Sport in Northern Ireland.
- Gerry Storey. For services to Boxing in Northern Ireland.
- Ronald Edward Storey. For services to the Royal Air Force Association in Somerset.
- Marilyn Elaine Sugarhood. For services to Great Ormond Street Hospital, London.
- Philip James Sullivan. For services to Community Safety in Stroud, Gloucestershire.
- Alan Surtees. For services to Young People through The Duke of Edinburgh's Award.
- Christina Sweeney, Senior Executive Officer, Debt Centre, Trafford, Department for Work and Pensions.
- Isobel Sykes, Retained Crew Manager, Cheshire Fire and Rescue Service. For services to Local Government.
- Amajit Talwar, Chief Executive, Punch Records. For services to the Music Industry and to the community in the West Midlands.
- Leonard William Tate, Chair, The Ipswich Hospital NHS Trust Cardiology User Group and Vice-President of Heartbeat, East SuVolk. For services to Healthcare.
- Dr Peter Howard Lovel Tate. For services to General Medical Practice.
- Frederick James Taylor. For services to Angling.
- Rodney George Gordon Taylor, Managing Director, Seaward Electronic Ltd and Chair, Aspire Campaign. For services to Business in the North East.
- Gunvant Jeshavantray Thacker. For services to the community in North West London.
- The Reverend Harald Daniel Thomas. For services to the community in Torfaen, South East Wales.
- The Reverend Canon Owen Robert Spencer-Thomas. For services to the Church of England and to the community in Cambridgeshire.
- Wendy Elizabeth Thomas, J.P. For services to the Administration of Justice in the East Riding of Yorkshire.
- Alastair Thompson, Director, Logistical Services, Metropolitan Police Service. For services to the Police.
- Dorothy Thompson, School Crossing Warden, North Shields. For services to Education.
- Lisbeth Margaret Thoms. For services to Conservation in Scotland.
- John Francis Thornley, B.E.M., Grade C1, Ministry of Defence.
- John Michael Thornley. For services to Education in the Isle of Man.
- Margaret Tighe, Senior Officer, Internal Investigations, H.M. Revenue and Customs.
- John Joseph Tissiman, Chair, Edward Pryor and Son Ltd and Vice-President, Engineering Employers' Federation. For services to Engineering in South Yorkshire.
- Sarah June Todd. For services to the community in West Dunbartonshire.
- Dr Delma Tomlin. For services to the Arts in Yorkshire.
- Jack Crossley Tordoff. For services to Business and to Sport in Bradford.
- Norma Town. For services to the community in Darlington, County Durham.
- Doreen Ann Temple Trainor. For services to Nursing in West Lothian.
- Norman Alan Trebilcock. For services to the South Western Ambulance Service and to the Front Line Emergency Equipment Trust.
- Bryan Leslie Treherne. For services to International Trade and to the community in Croydon, Surrey.
- Julia Mary Victoria Tremlett, D.L. For services to the community in Devon.
- Grenville Tuck, Caretaker, Coombe Hill Infant and Junior Schools, Kingston upon Thames. For services to Education.
- Shirley Ann Turner, lately Strategic Planning Officer, Hampshire County Council and Chair, Education Building Development Officers' Group. For services to Local Government.
- Roy Tyson, Director of Facilities and Commercial Development, Doncaster and Bassetlaw Hospitals NHS Foundation Trust. For services to the NHS.
- Lucy Vale, School Crossing Warden, Dorridge, West Midlands. For services to Education.
- Barbara Ann Vaughan. For services to Health and to the community in Tackley, Oxfordshire.
- Kathryn Elizabeth Vincent. For services to the Children's International Summer Villages.
- Robert James Vinson, Detective Chief Inspector, Kent Police. For services to the Police.
- Sheila Vizard, lately Head, South Acton Children's Centre, Ealing, London. For services to Children and Families.
- David Wadkin, Vice-Chair of Governors, Oakwood Technology College, Rotherham. For services to Education.
- David James Walker, Construction Director, Bowmer and Kirkland Ltd. For services to the Construction Industry in the East Midlands.
- Maureen Walker. For services to the community in Eaglesham, Glasgow.
- Lawrence John Wall, Delivery Centre Manager (Gloucester) E.ON Central Networks. For services to Flood Rescue.
- James Norman Culbert Walsh. For services to Bee Keeping in Northern Ireland.
- Robert William Walton. For services to the Hospitality Industry.
- Elizabeth, Mrs. Ward. For services to Deaf and Hard of Hearing People in Northern Ireland.
- John Richard Owen-Ward. For services to the City of London Corporation.
- Stuart McLean Wardrop, T.D. For services to the Children's Hearings System in Scotland.
- Diane Teresa Warrick, Nursery Nurse, Millbank Primary School, Westminster, London. For services to Early Years Education.
- Brian Edward Waters. For services to Maritime Engineering and to Coastal Defence in West Sussex.
- Ann Margaret Watters, Chair, Kirkcaldy Civic Society. For services to Heritage in Fife.
- Vivien Rosemary Watterson, District Business Manager, London Traffic Prosecution Service, Crown Prosecution Service.
- Shirley Waving, Teaching Assistant, St. Mary's Primary School, Lewisham, London. For services to Education.
- Colin Weightman. For services to Bee Keeping.
- Susan Wheatley, Detective Chief Inspector, Hertfordshire Constabulary. For services to the Police.
- Anthony Whitbourn, Foster Carer, York. For services to Children and Families.
- Wendy Whitbourn, Foster Carer, York. For services to Children and Families.
- Ian Maurice White. For charitable services.
- James Robert White. For services to Nature Conservation in Dorset.
- John Raymond White. For services to Squash in Derbyshire.
- Roslyn Marise White. For services to 1st Sandleheath Sea Scout Group and Hampshire Scout Caving Club.
- Jean Whittaker. For services to George Eliot Hospitals NHS Trust.
- Neil Wilcoxson. For services to the Coal Industry.
- Joanne Lesley, Mrs. Willcox, Founder, Jo Malone. For services to the Beauty Industry.
- David John Williams, Q.F.S.M. For services to St. John Ambulance Brigade in Wales.
- Janet, Mrs. Williams, Education Manager, H.M. Prison Highpoint, Newmarket, Suffolk. For Services to Education.
- John Williams, D.L., Leader, Darlington Borough Council. For services to Local Government.
- John Thomas Williams, Executive Head Chef, The Ritz and Chair, Academy of Culinary Arts. For services to the Hospitality Industry.
- Marjorie, Mrs. Williams. For services to Heritage and to the community in Guildford.
- Carolyn Williamson, Secretary, British Association for Women in Policing. For services to the Police.
- Andrew Robert Wilson, First Call Operative, National Grid. For services to Flood Rescue.
- Christine Wilson, lately Head of Courts Administration Durham, H.M. Courts Service.
- Edward Wilson, lately Street Cleaner. For services to Local Government in the City of Westminster.
- Stephen Wilson. For public service.
- Dorothy May Winner, School Catering Assistant and Cleaner, Northgate High School, Norfolk. For services to Education.
- Michael John Wise. For services to Julia's House Children's Hospice and to the community in Dorset.
- Nigel Leonard Robert Wolland, Chief Engineer, Odeon Leicester Square. For services to the Film Industry.
- Patricia Ann Wood. For services to Animal Welfare in North Staffordshire.
- Thomas Holmes Wood, Chair, Ripon Select Foods Ltd. For services to the Food Industry and to the community in Ripon, North Yorkshire.
- William David Wood, Higher Executive Officer, The Pension Service, Department for Work and Pensions.
- The Reverend Carolyn Woodcock, Chaplain, H.M. Prison Lancaster Castle.
- Adrian Woods, Project Manager, Pit Stop 2000 Ltd., Halifax. For services to Disadvantaged Young People.
- Kathleen Woodside. For services to the War Widows' Association.
- Veronica Wootten, Trustee, Birmingham Royal Institution for the Blind, and Chair of Governors, Queen Alexandra College, Birmingham. For services to Further Education.
- Janet Lilian Wrighton, Director for Europe, International Federation of Netball Associations. For services to Sport.
- Dr. Julia Trea Margaret Wycherley. For services to Amphibian and Reptile Conservation.
- Dr. John Martin Wykeham. For services to the National Portrait Gallery.
- Nancy Patricia, Mrs. Wynne. For services to Staffordshire Police.
- Betty Yao, Programme Director, Asia House. For services to Asian Arts and Culture.
- Keith Yearsley. For services to the community in Macclesfield, Cheshire.
- John William Young. For services to the community in South Yorkshire.
- Keith Young. For services to the Publishing Industry.
- Ayyub Youssouf, Senior Executive Officer, Jobcentre Plus, Department for Work and Pensions.

=== Queen's Police Medal (QPM) ===
ENGLAND AND WALES

- Philip Aspey, Superintendent, Police Superintendents' Association.
- Robert John Beckley, Deputy Chief Constable, Avon and Somerset Constabulary.
- Neil Boon, Superintendent, Surrey Police.
- David Commins, Chief Superintendent, Metropolitan Police Service.
- Michael Culverhouse, lately Chief Constable, Isle of Man Constabulary.
- Peter Gordon Currie, Detective Chief Superintendent, Merseyside Police.
- John William Curry, Chief Superintendent, Her Majesty's Inspectorate of Constabulary Wakefield.
- James Gamble, Assistant Chief Constable, Serious Organised Crime Agency.
- Alfred Henry Hitchcock, Deputy Assistant Commissioner, Metropolitan Police Service.
- Ms Julia Hodson, Deputy Chief Constable, West Yorkshire Police.
- Joseph Holness, Constable, Kent Police.
- Jerry Kirkby, Temporary Assistant Chief Constable, Surrey Police.
- John Richard Graham MacBrayne, Detective Superintendent, Metropolitan Police Service.
- Kenneth MacRae, Detective Sergeant, Metropolitan Police Service.
- Ms Amanda Mason, Inspector, West Midlands Police.
- Andrew Murphy, Detective Chief Superintendent, Metropolitan Police Service.
- Anthony Morgan Pain, Constable, South Wales Police.
- Antony Paul Porter, Detective Chief Superintendent, Greater Manchester Police.
- Paul McKinley Robb, lately Assistant Chief Constable, British Transport Police.

SCOTLAND

- John Rodger Corrigan, Assistant Chief Constable, Strathclyde Police.
- Norma, Mrs. Graham, Deputy Chief Constable, Fife Constabulary.
- John Deans (Ian) Marshall, Constable, Dumfries and Galloway Police.

NORTHERN IRELAND

- Milton Kerr, Acting Chief Inspector, Police Service of Northern Ireland.
- Richard Adam Russell, Chief Superintendent, Police Service of Northern Ireland.
- Terence Patrick Shevlin, Superintendent, Police Service of Northern Ireland.

=== Queen's Fire Service Medal (QFSM) ===
ENGLAND AND WALES

- Nigel Thompson Charlston, Senior Fire Safety Manager, West Yorkshire Fire and Rescue Service.
- Robert Fyfe, Deputy Chief Fire Officer, Devon and Somerset Fire and Rescue Service.
- John Parry, Chief Fire Officer, Oxfordshire Fire and Rescue Service.
- David Michael Webb, Chief Fire Officer, Leicestershire Fire and Rescue Service.

SCOTLAND

- John Russell, Scottish Community Fire Safety Coordinator, Strathclyde Fire and Rescue.
- Anthony Wood, Deputy Chief Officer, Highlands and Islands Fire and Rescue Service.

=== Queen's Volunteer Reserves Medal (QVRM) ===
ROYAL NAVY

- Commander Susan Jane Eagles, Royal Naval Reserve.

ARMY

- Lieutenant Colonel David Charles Atkinson, T.D. (528451), Corps of Royal Electrical and Mechanical Engineers, Territorial Army.
- Major Anthony Thomas Bell, T.D. (532343), Corps of Royal Engineers, Territorial Army.
- 24176495 Warrant Officer Class 1 John Dixon, Adjutant General's Corps (Staff and Personnel Support Branch), Territorial Army.
- 24497845 Warrant Officer Class 1 Shaun David Mallinson, The Yorkshire Regiment, Territorial Army.
- Lieutenant Colonel Stephen Metcalfe, T.D. (504009), Corps of Royal Engineers, Territorial Army.

ROYAL AIR FORCE

- Flight Sergeant John Raymond Grant (F2632416). Royal Auxiliary Air Force.

== Crown Dependencies ==
=== The Most Excellent Order of the British Empire ===
Jersey

- John Mills for services to the civil service

==== Officer of the Order of the British Empire (OBE) ====
Isle of Man

- Noel Cringle, for public service in the Isle of Man.

==== Member of the Order of the British Empire (MBE) ====
Guernsey

- Cynthia Cormack, for her services to child health care in South Africa.

Jersey

- Muriel Poisson for her fund-raising activities to supporting the Battle of Flowers

Isle of Man

- Peter Geddes, for services to Industrial Heritage
- John Thornley, for services to education

== Cook Islands ==
Below are the individuals appointed by Elizabeth II in her right as Head of State of the Cook Islands, on advice of the Ministers of the Cook Islands.

=== Order of the British Empire ===
==== Officer of the Order of the British Empire (OBE) ====
- Mapu Tangatatutai Taia. For services to the community and the public sector.

==== Member of the Order of the British Empire (MBE) ====
- Temaeva Arii Tepouaʻe Kopu Koao Raemaki Karati. For services in the community and the public sector.

=== British Empire Medal ===
- Tei Shepherd Charlie Lockington. For services to the community.
- Ben Samuel, J.P. For services in the community and the public sector.

== Barbados ==
Below are the individuals appointed by Elizabeth II in her right as Queen of Barbados, on advice of Her Majesty's Barbados Ministers.

=== Knight Bachelor ===
- Dr. Albert Cecil Graham. For services to medicine and paediatric medicine.

== Grenada ==
Below are the individuals appointed by Elizabeth II in her right as Queen of Grenada, on advice of Her Majesty's Grenada Ministers.

=== Order of the British Empire ===
==== Commander of the Order of the British Empire (CBE) ====
- Dr. Lamuel A. Stanislaus. For services to the community and to medicine.

==== Member of the Order of the British Empire (MBE) ====
- Joseph Nathaniel Bain. For Credit Unionism and public service.
- Ethelbert Munro-Baptiste. For services to the community.
- Ricardo Keens-Douglas. For services to education and culture.

== Solomon Islands ==
Below are the individuals appointed by Elizabeth II in her right as Queen of Solomon Islands, on advice of Her Majesty's Solomon Islands Ministers.

=== Order of the British Empire ===
==== Officer of the Order of the British Empire (OBE) ====
- Moon Pin Quan. For services to commerce, politics and the community.
- Japhet Waipora. For services to provincial administration and politics.

==== Member of the Order of the British Empire (MBE) ====
- Drummond Ama. For services to shipping and the Church.
- Dr. Douglas Pickacha. For public administration and Medical and Health services

== Tuvalu ==
Below are the individuals appointed by Elizabeth II in her right as Queen of Tuvalu, on advice of Her Majesty's Tuvalu Ministers.

=== Order of the British Empire ===
==== Officer of the Order of the British Empire (OBE) ====
- Panapasi Nelesone. For public and community service.

==== Member of the Order of the British Empire (MBE) ====
- Tili Kelese. For public and community service.
- Faaiu Paeniu. For public and community service.
- Maimoaga Salesa. For public and community service.

=== British Empire Medal (BEM) ===
- Elia Lopati. For public and community service.
- Pokia Papa. For public and community service.
- Ioasa Tilaima. For public and community service.

== Saint Vincent and the Grenadines ==
Below are the individuals appointed by Elizabeth II in her right as Queen of Saint Vincent and the Grenadines, on advice of Her Majesty's Saint Vincent and the Grenadines Ministers.

=== Order of Saint Michael and Saint George ===
==== Companion of the Order of St Michael and St George (CMG) ====
- The Reverend Victor Hezekiah Job. For services to religion and the community.

=== Order of the British Empire ===
==== Officer of the Order of the British Empire (OBE) ====
- Owen Douglas Brisbane (Jr). For services to the Auxiliary Arm of the Royal Saint Vincent and the Grenadines Police Force, civil society and business.
- Jestina Viola, Mrs. Charles. For services to social and community work.

==== Member of the Order of the British Empire (MBE) ====
- Keith Gregory Miller. For services to Policing and law and order.
- Olsen Verald Peters. For services to Calypso music and music education.
- Dawn Waverley, Mrs.Smith. For services to tourism and catering.

== Belize ==
Below are the individuals appointed by Elizabeth II in her right as Queen of Belize, on advice of Her Majesty's Saint Christopher and Nevis Ministers.

=== Order of Saint Michael and Saint George ===
==== Knight Commander of the Order of St Michael and St George (KCMG) ====
- Barry Manfield Bowen. For contribution to commerce and industry.

=== Order of the British Empire ===
==== Commander of the Order of the British Empire (CBE) ====
- Dr. Kenrick Roford Leslie, M.B.E. For contribution to Meteorology and Science.

==== Officer of the Order of the British Empire (OBE) ====
- Brigadier General Lloyd Gillett. For contribution to national defence and community service.
- Gerald Lincoln Westby. For contribution to national defence and community service.

==== Member of the Order of the British Empire (MBE) ====
- Alan Burn. For services to maritime industries.
- Crispin Lincoln Jeffries. For service to the Belize Police Force.
- Yolanda Modesta, Mrs. Murray. For service to the Belize Police Force.
- Dr. Arile Oswald Petters. For services to science and education.

== Antigua and Barbuda ==
Below are the individuals appointed by Elizabeth II in her right as Queen of Antigua and Barbuda, on advice of Her Majesty's Saint Christopher and Nevis Ministers.

=== Order of the British Empire ===
==== Officer of the Order of the British Empire (OBE) ====
- Joselyn Maudlyn Eusalyn, Mrs. Lewis, M.B.E. For public service.

==== Member of the Order of the British Empire (MBE) ====
- Miss Yvonne Pamela Henry. For public service.
- Miss Verdeline Iothie Wyre. For public service.

== Saint Christopher and Nevis ==
Below are the individuals appointed by Elizabeth II in her right as Queen of Saint Christopher ad Nevis, on advice of Her Majesty's Saint Christopher and Nevis Ministers.

=== Order of the British Empire ===
==== Officer of the Order of the British Empire (OBE) ====
- Hesketh Walters Benjamin. For public service.

==== Member of the Order of the British Empire (MBE) ====
- Stanley Reginald Franks (Jr.). For public service.
- Ms Susanna Christiana Lee. For public service

== Sources ==
- "No. 58557". The London Gazette (Supplement). 29 December 2007. pp. 1–26. (UK)
- "No. 58558". The London Gazette (Supplement). 29 December 2007. p. 29. (Cook Islands)
- "No. 58559". The London Gazette (Supplement). 29 December 2007. p. 31. (Barbados)
- "No. 58560". The London Gazette (Supplement). 29 December 2007. p. 33. (Grenada)
- "No. 58561". The London Gazette (Supplement). 29 December 2007. p. 35. (Solomon Islands)
- "No. 58562". The London Gazette (Supplement). 29 December 2007. p. 37. (Tuvalu)
- "No. 58563". The London Gazette (Supplement). 29 December 2007. p. 39. (Saint Vincent and the Grenadines)
- "No. 58564". The London Gazette (Supplement). 29 December 2007. p. 41. (Belize)
- "No. 58565". The London Gazette (Supplement). 29 December 2007. p. 43. (Antigua and Barbuda)
- "No. 58566". The London Gazette (Supplement). 29 December 2007. p. 45. (Saint Christopher and Nevis)
