= Sandra Caldwell =

Sandra Caldwell may refer to:

- Sandra Caldwell (civil servant) (born 1948), British civil servant
- Sandra Caldwell (actress), American actress
