= Errol Douglas =

Errol Douglas MBE (born 8 January 1964) is a Guyanese-British hair stylist. He was presented with an MBE by the Queen for services to hairdressing in 2008. In 1998 Douglas opened his own salon in Belgravia, London.

== Career ==
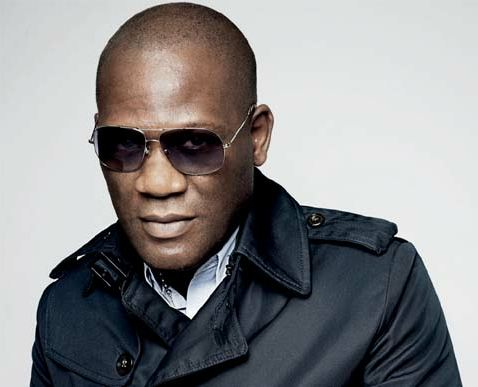
Errol Douglas

Douglas first started working in an East London salon aged 11. He gained his initial qualifications at Roger Heart's aged 16. During this time he met Paul Edmonds and moved to Neville Daniel. When Paul Edmonds opened his own salon in 1984, Douglas became Edmonds' Artistic Director. Douglas later returned to Neville Daniel as his Artistic Director (for six years) until he opened his own salon business in 1998. Douglas' session styling and fashion work is regularly featured in magazines such as Vogue, Harpers & Queen, Tatler, Red, Cosmopolitan and Elle. In 2010 he was named "Most Wanted Creative Talent" in the Most Wanted Awards for his "mesmerising photographic work". Errol is a regular contributor to live shows and seminars including performances in Australia, Britain, Canada, Germany, Italy, Spain, Switzerland and the US. Douglas has also taken part in the World Hairdressing Congress, BBC Clothes Show Live, Cosmopolitan Show, The Wedding Show, BBC Fashion Live and the Prima Baby Show. While at Paul Edmonds, Errol Douglas became a regular contributor on the BBC Clothes Show and the BBC Style Challenge. More recently, Errol has had a weekly slot on the Boot's Wellbeing channel, appeared on the Disney Channel, Davina McCall's 'Oblivion', Channel Four's 'Model Behaviour' and BBC 2's 'Tell it to me Straight'.

In June 2013 it was announced that Errol Douglas is to launch his own range of electrical styling tools in partnership with UK manufacturer Corioliss Ltd. Douglas and members of his Belgravia salon team contributed to the design of the tools, which include an infrared hair dryer and keratin capsule system hair styler.

== Awards ==
Douglas won British Afro Hairdresser of the Year in 1994 and 1996. In 1995 he won the London L'Oreal Colour Trophy and the Cosmopolitan Style Award. In 2003 Errol was awarded the Fellowship Hairdresser of the Year and the Fellowship Gold Star Consumer Salon in 2005. In 1994 Douglas was selected as a Fellowship F.A.M.E Team. In 2008 Douglas was named Cosmopolitan's Ultimate Man of the Year. In 2011 Douglas won the Evening Standard's London Lifestyle Award for London Hairdressing Salon of the Year.

Douglas is an active member of the Fellowship for British Hairdressing and was awarded with the Fellow with Honours award in the year 2000. He is a member of the National Hairdressers Federation, Hairdressing Council and actively supports HABIA. In March 2013, Errol Douglas was named as President of the Fellowship for British Hairdressing.

In March 2013, Errol Douglas was voted "Hair Hero 2013" by Hair Magazine.

== Clients ==
Errol Douglas has worked with a number of notable clients, including Diana Ross, Brad Pitt, Barbra Streisand, Christy Turlington, Cindy Crawford, Naomi Campbell, Melanie Griffith, Dawn French, Jennifer Saunders, Iman, Kelly Brook, Emilia Fox, Sophie Anderton, Annie Lennox, Cat Deeley, Lady Victoria Hervey, Lady Helen Windsor, Uma Thurman, Pamela Anderson, Lenny Kravitz and Oscar winner Forest Whitaker.

== Charity ==
Douglas is a supporter of a number of charities, including Hair-Raising (for Great Ormond Street Hospital), and Make A Difference Makeover in support of Centrepoint's work with homeless people.
