= Robert Cassen =

British economist

- Born: 24 March 1935
- Education: Bedford School, New College, Oxford, University of California, Berkeley, Harvard University
- Scientific career
- Fields: Economics
- Workplaces: University of Oxford, London School of Economics

Professor Robert Harvey Cassen OBE (born 1935), is a British economist and former Professor of the Economics of Development at the University of Oxford.

== Biography ==
Robert Cassen was born on 24 March 1935 and educated at Bedford School, at New College, Oxford, at the University of California, Berkeley, and at Harvard University, where he completed his doctorate in economics. He taught in the department of economics at the London School of Economics between 1961 and 1969, was Senior Economist at the Overseas Development Ministry between 1966 and 1967, Senior Economist at the World Bank between 1969 and 1972 (and again between 1980 and 1981), Special Advisor to the House of Commons Select Committee on Overseas Development between 1973 and 1974, Director of the Oxford Department of International Development between 1986 and 1993, Professor of the Economics of Development at the University of Oxford between 1986 and 1997, and Professorial Fellow at St Antony's College, Oxford between 1986 and 1997. He has been visiting professor at the London School of Economics since 1997.

He was appointed OBE in the 2008 New Year Honours.

== Publications ==
- India: Population, Economy, Society, 1978
- Planning for Growing Populations, 1979
- World Development Report, 1981
- Rich Country Interests and Third World Development, 1982
- Soviet Interests in the Third World, 1985
- Does Aid Work?, 1986, 2nd edition 1994
- Poverty in India, 1992
- Population and Development: Old Debates, New Conclusions, 1994
- India: The Future of Economic Reform, 1995
- 21st Century India: Population, Economy, Human Development and the Environment, 2004
- Tackling Low Educational Achievement, 2007
