= Alexander Markham =

British cancer researcher

Sir Alexander Fred Markham, born 1950, is professor of medicine at the University of Leeds, director of the Molecular Medicine Institute at St James's University Hospital, and a former chief executive of Cancer Research UK.

== Academic career ==
Markham graduated from the University of Birmingham with a BSc in chemistry in 1971 and a PhD, also in chemistry, in 1974. He qualified in medicine in 1985 at the Universities of London and Oxford.

Markham has been one of the pioneers of molecular genetics research in the UK since the late 1980s. His work has included the development of DNA fingerprinting, work which received the Queen's Award for Technological Achievement in 1990. He has been a professor of medicine at the University of Leeds since 1993.

Markham serves on a number of advisory panels for the Medical Research Council and the Department of Health. He is chairman of the Office for the Strategic Coordination of Health Research (OSCHR) Translational Medicine Board.

He is a fellow of the Academy of Medical Sciences and a former chairman of the National Cancer Research Institute.

Markham also advises the German government on its cancer research strategy.

== Personal life ==
Markham's late wife Dr Lisa Brown, Lady Markham, was an expert biochemist and a member of the British Toxicology Society. She worked as a Chartered Patent Attorney. The couple have two children; Grace and James. Markham is a fan of Manchester City.

== Honours ==
Markham received a knighthood in the 2008 New Year Honours for services to medicine.

He has been awarded honorary degrees from:

- University of Surrey
- University of Stirling (D.Univ) on 7 November 2008
- University of Leeds (D.Sc) in 2006
- University of Brighton (MD) in Summer 2012
- University of Birmingham (D.Univ) in 2013

== Charitable work ==
Professor Markham sits on the boards of many charities, including:

- Arthritis Research UK
- The Candlelighters Trust
- The Foulkes Foundation
- The Wellcome Trust
