= Diana Babar =

British civil servant

- Occupation: Solicitor

Diana Babar, CBE was a solicitor and Team Leader of the Litigation and Employment Group in the Treasury Solicitor's Department.

She was appointed Commander of the Order of the British Empire (CBE) in the 2008 New Year Honours.
