= Nicholas John Bennett =

- Born: 30 September 1948
- Died: 10 October 2023 (aged 75)
- Occupation: Civil servant

Nicholas John Bennett CB (30 September 1948 – 10 October 2023) was a British civil servant. He was Director-General of Strategic Technologies at the Ministry of Defence (UK) until his retirement.

Bennett became a Companion of the Order of the Bath in the 2008 New Year Honours. He died on 10 October 2023, at the age of 75.
