= Clair du Boulay =

British expert in pathology and medical education

Clair du Boulay OBE FRCPath
- Born: Clair Evelyn Munday; Adelaide, Australia
- Education: University of Southampton
- Known for: Services to Medicine
- Spouse: Professor Frank Smith
- Scientific career
- Fields: Medical education Gastrointestinal pathology Soft tissue sarcomas

Clair Evelyn Houssemayne du Boulay is a retired British professor and expert in pathology and medical education. She was the Vice-President of the Royal College of Pathologists from 2002 to 2005.

== Career ==
Du Boulay practised as a consultant pathologist specialising in gastrointestinal pathology and soft tissue sarcomas at the University of Southampton.

Following her clinical work she became involved in medical education and was appointed Postgraduate Dean at the Wessex Deanery, where she managed the training and education of healthcare professionals in more than fifty NHS Trusts across the south of England.

She was Vice-President of the Royal College of Pathologists from 2002 to 2005.

== Awards and honours ==
She was a fellow of the Royal College of Pathologists.

She was appointed as an Officer of the Order of the British Empire in the 2008 New Year Honours for services to medicine.

== Publications ==
Cu Boulay is the author and co-author of multiple peer-reviewed journal articles and books including:

- Revalidation for doctors in the United Kingdom: the end or the beginning? - BMJ, 2000
- From CME to CPD: getting better at getting better? - BMJ, 2000
- The clinical skills resource: a review of current practice - Medical Education, 1999
- Immunohistochemistry of soft tissue tumours: a review - The Journal of Pathology, 1985
- An immunohistochemical study of Whipple's disease using the immunoperoxidase technique - Human Pathology, 1982
