= Robert Naylor (hospital director) =

Sir Robert Naylor was the Chief Executive of University College London Hospitals (UCLH) NHS Foundation Trust until September 2016.

Naylor has been a Chief Executive in the NHS for 24 years and has been Chief Executive of UCLH since November 2000. UCLH is one of the largest NHS Trusts, comprising six hospitals in central London. It is a founder member of the recently accredited UCL Partners, an Academic Health Science Centre designated by the Department of Health.

Naylor has been an advisor to various strategy groups associated with healthcare reform. He is particularly interested in organisational development as a means of empowering clinical teams and promoting leadership skills. He has been a chairman of a number of National and Regional committees and is a Senior Associate Fellow at the University of Warwick, Institute of Governance and Public Management.

Naylor was knighted in the New Year Honours 2008. In 2011, his salary was said to be the fifth-highest in the English NHS. In 2015 the Health Service Journal judged him as the fourth top Chief Executive in the National Health Service.

In March 2017, Naylor published his review of NHS property and estates and how to make best use of the buildings and land. This included controversial recommendations to sell off NHS assets.
