= Ian McAllister (businessman) =

Scottish businessman (born 1943)

Sir Ian Gerald McAllister CBE (born 17 August 1943) is a Scottish businessman. Formerly Chairman of Ford Motor Company UK, he was Chairman of Network Rail from 2002 to 2009.

== Biography ==
McAllister was born in Glasgow to Ian McAllister and Margaret Mary McAllister. The family moved to Chorley, Lancashire when he was a child, and he received a Catholic education at Thornleigh Salesian College, Bolton. McAllister graduated from the University of London in 1964, where he gained a BSc in economics.

=== Ford ===
McAllister joined Ford as a finance trainee and progressed through various positions in sales and marketing in the UK and Germany before becoming the marketing director for Lincoln Mercury in the United States, returning to become managing director and latterly Chairman of the UK company which then encompassed just the Ford brand built at Dagenham. During his chairmanship, he returned the company to profitability from losses of £660Million in 1990, but transferred production of the new Mondeo to Genk, Belgium under Ford's global brand program; while retaining Escort estate production at Halewood and Fiesta production at Dagenham.

=== Outside Ford ===
While chairman of Ford, he held various industry positions, including becoming President of the Society of Motor Manufacturers and Traders. After retiring from Ford, McAllister has undertaken mainly Government orientated work, with his only non-executive post at Scottish and Newcastle.

McAllister was appointed Chairman of Network Rail in October 2002 following the acquisition of Railtrack. On 3 October 2008, he announced that he will not stand for re-election to continue as chairman of Network Rail. He has held this position for six years. In making the announcement, Sir Ian noted that as Network Rail moves to a "new phase in its development," it is appropriate that there be a new chairman to lead it there.

He was formerly: Deputy Chairman of the Qualifications and Curriculum Authority; a member of the Advisory Committee on Business and the Environment; an Advisory Council member of The Management School, Imperial College; Chairman of the Carbon Trust (2001-2011); a member of the Energy Saving Trust; a member of the advisory board of Victim Support.

=== Personal life ===
He is married to Susan and they have four offspring.

He was appointed Commander of the Order of the British Empire (CBE) in the 1996 New Year Honours and knighted in the 2008 New Year Honours. He was awarded an honorary Doctorate from Loughborough University in July 1999.

A committed Christian, McAllister enjoys gardening and supports Manchester United.
