= Rachel Hurst =

British activist

Rachel Mary Rosalind Hurst CBE is a British activist and former director of Disability Awareness in Action (DAA), an international network working on disability and human rights.

== Early training and employment ==
Born in 1939, Hurst trained as an actress, dancer and teacher at Rose Bruford College, using the qualification gained to work in an inner London primary school as a dance and drama teacher from 1970 to 1975.

== Disability activism ==
From the late 1960s onwards, Hurst started exhibiting symptoms of a congenital condition. She became a wheelchair-user in 1976 and subsequently lost her teaching job. She decided that she needed to meet other disabled people, so she contacted what was then the Greenwich Association for Disabled People. Hurst quickly became a trustee and, from 1983 to 1990 the chair, and altered the organisation to become the Greenwich Association of Disabled People and Centre for Independent Living (GADCIL), run by and for disabled people. The organisation took over the running of the local Dial-a-Ride service and were the driving force behind Forum@Greenwich, a community initiative for full accessibility and equality of opportunity. GADCIL was a member organisation of the British Council of Disabled People (BCODP), and Hurst was an officer of BCODP between 1983 and 1998, and its chair from 1985 to 1987. Hurst became a member of the Impact Foundation UK, an international initiative against avoidable disability. She, Sir John Wilson (the Chair of Impact), and Henry Enns the Chair of Disabled Peoples' International (DPI), created a charitable organisation to support the United Nations Decade of Disabled People, known as the Global Project in support of Disabled People, with Hurst as the Project Director, and the others on the board of Trustees, along with representatives from Inclusion International, the World Federation of the Deaf, the World Blind Union and others. In 1992 Hurst persuaded Nicholas Scott, then Minister for Disabled People, to support the organisation; it was thereafter renamed Disability Awareness in Action (DAA) and housed in various Government buildings.

DAA was an international information network on disability and human rights, promoting, supporting and co-ordinating local action globally in support of the rights of disabled people. They did this by publishing, in three languages, large print and braille, monthly newsletters with stories and experiences from disabled individuals or their organisations all over the world, and also a series of Resource Kits, designed to help fledgling organisations get off the ground and give them the tools they needed to campaign and change the situation for disabled people in their locality. Hurst was the Director of DAA from its creation in 1992 until her retirement in 2011. She was also actively involved in DPI, being on the World Council between 1987 and 2003. She also served as the Chair of the DPI European Union Committee (1992–1995) and of the DPI European Region (1995–1999).

Hurst has been awarded two honorary Doctorates, in Social Science from the University of Greenwich and in Law from Robert Gordon University, Aberdeen.

Hurst was granted the Freedom of the London Borough of Greenwich in 1990, and in 2003 won RADAR's Person of the Year Award, for the furtherance of Human Rights internationally.

In the 1995 New Year Honours she was awarded an OBE, followed in 2008 by a CBE.

Hurst has spoken at international, national and local conferences and seminars on the Disability Movement and equalisation of opportunities, Human Rights, Policy and Social Development, Bioethics and Disability, Independent Living, legislation, especially anti-discrimination, media images of disability, housing, access and transportation. She has been interviewed on local and national media and written articles in mainstream and disability press on disability rights issues. In the last few years her concentration has been on disablism, including bio-ethical concerns, such as genetics, genetic screening and the right to life.

== Publications ==
- With Tomson Dube, Richard Light and Joshua Malinga, "Promoting Inclusion? Disabled people, legislation and public policy", ch. 8 pp 104–118, IN OR OUT OF THE MAINSTREAM, (Disability Press, Leeds) 2006.
- 'Disability, Development and the Biotechnologies', 49(4) pp 101–106, DEVELOPMENT (Palgrave) 2006
- 'Disabled People' Chap C2 in AN ALTERNATIVE WORLD HEALTH REPORT, (Global Health Watch) 2006.
- 'The Perfect Crime', BETTER HUMANS? The Politics of human enhancement and life Extension, (Demos) 2006.
- With Jim Elder-Woodward and Tony Manwaring, Forward, INDEPENDENT LIVING, THE RIGHT TO BE EQUAL CITIZENS, (Demos) 2005.
- 'Disabled Peoples' International: Europe and the Social Model of Disability, THE SOCIAL MODEL OF DISABILITY: EUROPE AND THE MAJORITY WORLD, (The Disability Press, Leeds) 2005.
- With Tony Manwaring, Forward, DISABLISM, HOW TO TACKLE THE LAST PREJUDICE, (Demos), 2004.
- 'The International Disability Rights Movement and the ICF', DISABILITY AND REHABILITATION, 2003: VOL. 25.No. 11-12. 572-576 (Taylor & Francis Ltd.) 2003.
- 'Assisted suicide, disability and human rights', Forum on Physician-assisted death: dying with dignity? The Lancet Neurology, vol. 2 (10), London, 2003.
- 'Conclusion: Enabling or Disabling Globalisation?' CONTROVERSIAL ISSUES IN A DISABLING SOCIETY, (Open University Press) 2003.
- "Why a Convention on the Rights of Disabled People?" BRITISH INSTITUTE OF HUMAN RIGHTS NEWSLETTER, Autumn, 2001.
- 'To Revise or Not to Revise?', DISABILITY & SOCIETY, (Taylor & Francis Ltd) 2000.
- TRAINING MANUAL ON HUMAN RIGHTS AND THE MEDIA, (DAA), 1999.
- 'Disabled People's Organisations and Development: Strategies for Change', DISABILITY AND DEVELOPMENT, ed. Stone, E., (The Disability Press), Leeds, 1999
- ARE DISABLED PEOPLE INCLUDED?, an exposure document on the violation of disabled people's human rights (DAA), 1998.
- "A Disabled Person's Viewpoint", SERVICES FOR YOUNG PEOPLE WITH CHRONIC DISORDERS, (Royal College of Physicians), London, 1996.
- 'Choice and Empowerment - Lessons from Europe', DISABILITY & SOCIETY, (Carfax), 1995.
- OVERCOMING OBSTACLES TO THE INTEGRATION OF DISABLED PEOPLE, UNESCO, sponsored report as a contribution to the World Summit on Social Development, (DAA), 1995.
- "Self-Help for Disabled People", YEARBOOK OF CO-OPERATIVE ENTERPRISE, 1992. (Plunkett Foundation) January, 1992.
- "Independent Living, Civil Rights and Housing", BUILDING OUR LIVES, ed. Linda Laurie (Shelter), 1991.
- 'Disabled People Should Influence Their Own Future', Social Work Today, (British Association of Social Workers), January 26, 1987.
- In and Out of Employment for Disabled People, Open University (UK), 1986. Booklet of 20pp.
- "Centre For Independent Living", BULLETIN, (London GLC), 1985.
- "A Voice To Be Reckoned With", DISABILITY NOW, (Spastics Society), February 1987.
- "Een Stem Waar Rekening mee Gehonden Moet Worden", VRINDENKRING, (Joanna Stichting, Arnhem), July 1987. Dutch translation.
- GETTING IN ON THE ACT, (Thames TV, London), co-author: W. Bingley, 1987. 24pp.
- "Access In Japan", ACCESS ACTION, (Access Committee for England), 1988.
