= Sandra Caldwell (civil servant) =

British civil servant

Sandra Mary Caldwell CB JP (born 20 June 1948) is a retired British civil servant. She served as director of field operations for the Health and Safety Executive from 2004 to 2009 and also as deputy chief executive of the HSE from 2008 to 2009. She was appointed Companion of the Order of the Bath (CB) in the 2008 New Year Honours.
