= Corioliss =

UK-based hair and beauty company

Corioliss is an international hair and beauty company founded in the United Kingdom in 2002 that manufactures its own electrical hair products, hair accessories and hair care range. Corioliss was named "the Dyson of the Hair World" by Vogue. The Corioliss award-winning titanium hair straightener range are manufactured at the company's factories in Korea and China.

Corioliss was initially represented in shopping centers throughout the UK with exclusive concession stands in Harrods, Selfridges and Debenhams. In 2009, the company expanded to the United States, and as of January 2015, the Corioliss brand was represented in 46 countries worldwide. Corioliss hair straighteners & hair dryers have won various awards, such as; "Product Innovation of the Year", "Product You Can’t Live Without", "Hair Awards Winner", "Best Creative Hot Tool", and "Best Hair Buys". Corioliss supplied salon styling tools for Celebrity Big Brother 2007 and 2011.

== Endorsements ==
Michelle Obama’s personal hair stylist Johnny Wright revealed in a 2010 InStyle magazine Q&A, “I’m in love with the Corioliss Flat Iron.” In an article explaining how to get the First Lady’s trademark elegant style. Johnny explained that he rated the Corioliss Flat Iron above all others because, “it’s made with titanium, which is less damaging than other metals”
