= Therese Hughes =

Therese Hughes MBE is a Northern Ireland hairdresser in Newry, County Down.

== Career ==
Hughes provides a wig boutique service for patients suffering hair loss as a result of treatment for cancer, alopecia and for various other reasons. She was awarded a MBE in the 2008 Honours List in recognition of her work with patients in The City Hospital, Belfast, Northern Ireland. Hughes owned several hairdressing salons before deciding to exclusively focus her expertise in providing wigs and hairpieces. She decided to launch this service in Northern Ireland after watching a woman going through the distress of hair loss following chemotherapy for breast cancer.
