= Timothy Hornsby =

British civil servant (1940–2026)

Timothy Richard Hornsby, CBE (22 September 1940 – 6 August 2026) was a British civil servant. He was Chairman of the Horniman Museum 2004–2014.

== Life and career ==
Timothy Richard Hornsby was born in London on 22 September 1940, the only child of solicitor Harker William Hornsby. He studied modern history at Oxford. From 1991 to 1995 he was chief executive of Kingston Council. He was chief executive of the National Lottery from 1995 to 2001. He was then appointed a commissioner of the National Lottery Commission.

Hornsby died from complications of pneumonia on 6 August 2026, aged 85.
