= British Athletes Commission =

British athletic representative body

The British Elite Athletes Association
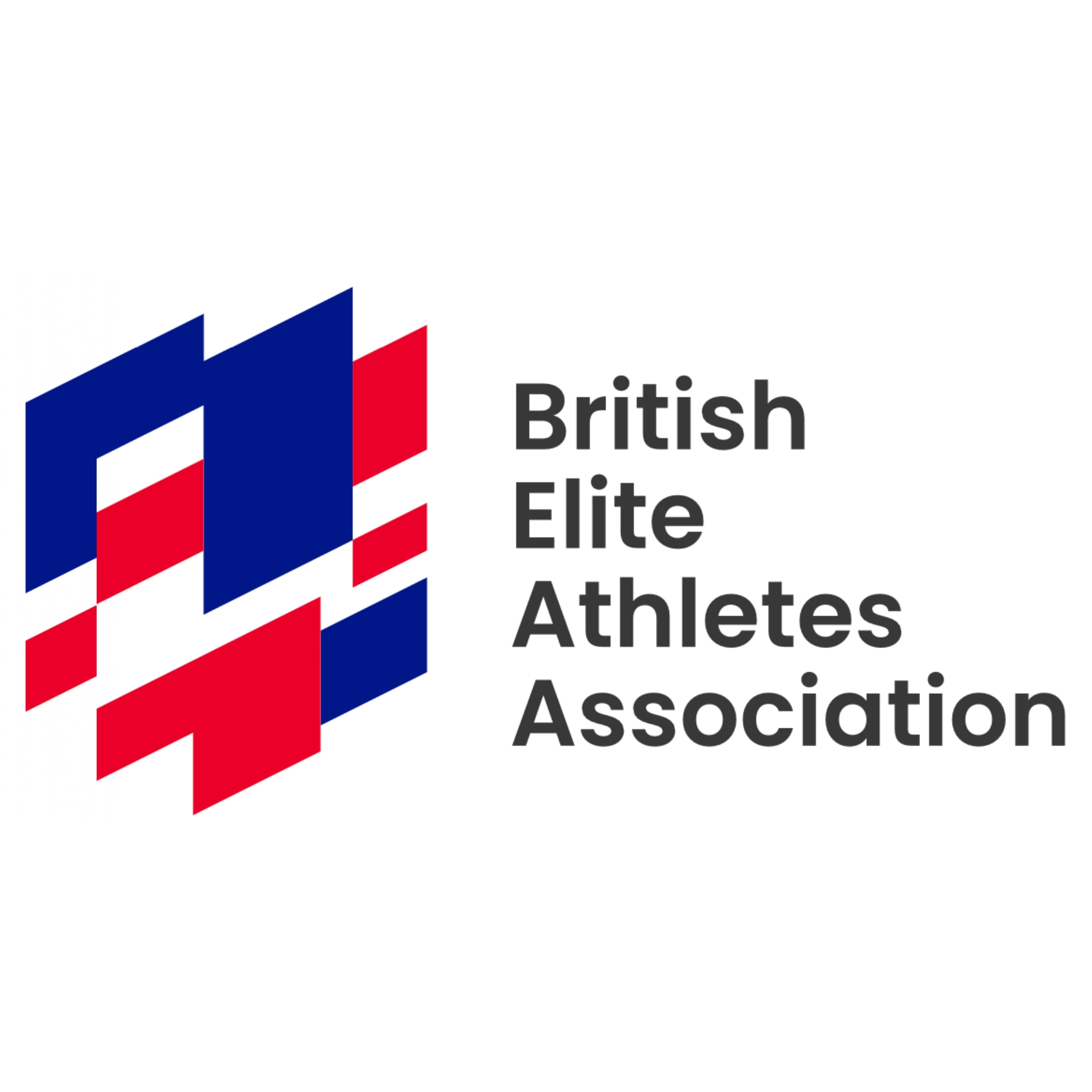
- Company type: Public
- Founded: 13 January 2004
- Headquarters: Ipswich, England
- Key people: Dominic Mahony, Chair
- Number of employees: 8
- Website: Official website

The British Elite Athletes Association (BEAA) was set up in 2004 to represent the interests of athletes in Great Britain to decision makers in sport, and to help athletes in member sports access support, representation and community within their sport and beyond.

The BEAA is an independent organisation representing the views of athletes to major decision making bodies such as the British Olympic Association, UK Sport and national governing bodies.

In 2020, the BEAA (then-British Athletes Commission) launched a helpline in partnership with the NSPCC to support gymnasts affected by complaints of abuse within the sport. They ultimately supported over 280 gymnasts and their families affected by abuse and mistreatment.

In September 2022 the British Athletes Commission rebranded to the British Elite Athletes Association following the appointment of CEO Anna Watkins, a double Olympian rower.

== Structure ==
- Chair: Dominic Mahony
- Chief executive officer: Anna Watkins

The board consists of:

- Dominic Mahony
- Rod Jaques
- Asha Philip
- Hollie Pearne-Webb
- Peter Crowther
- Jennifer Nel
- Milan Sud
- Pranav Soneji
- Martin Fewell
- Anna Watkins
