= Kiran Bali =

British Magistrate

Kiran Bali MBE JP

Personal details
- Born: 1978 (age 47–48) Fartown, Huddersfield, West Yorkshire, England
- Occupation: Magistrate, climate change activist, interfaith leader

Kiran Bali (born 1978) is a British magistrate, climate change activist, interfaith leader and the Global Chair of the United Religions Initiative. She was born in Fartown, Huddersfield, in Yorkshire, England.

Bali has served as the general secretary of the Hindu Society of Kirklees and Calderdale, and was director of the Yorkshire and the Humber Faiths forum. She also served as president of the Huddersfield Interfaith Council. Bali was recognized by Queen Elizabeth II for her interfaith work when she was named a Member of the Most Excellent Order of the British Empire (MBE) in 2008. She is an advocate of interfaith cooperation on climate change, and she helped to launch the Hindu declaration on Climate Change in India in November 2015.

Bali was the youngest magistrate to sit at the Kirklees Magistrate Court. She also served as an independent member of the West Yorkshire Police Authority.
