= National Heart Forum =

Charitable organisation in the UK

The UK Health Forum (UKHF) (formerly National Heart Forum) is a charitable organisation in the UK allying over 60 charities, non-governmental and medical professional organizations in reducing the risks of coronary heart disease (CHD) and such related conditions as stroke, diabetes and cancer. Established in 1984, the NHF has three primary functions: (1) to facilitate the work of its members by providing a forum for communication and by coordinating their actions; (2) to encourage sound national and international action by researching CHD and related conditions and educating others about them; and (3) to aid policy makers and UKHF members in effective collaboration. Members include such organisations as the British Medical Association, the British Heart Foundation, Which? and Cancer Research UK.

Among other areas of interest, the UKHF has spoken publicly against irresponsible advertising of junk food to children.

It has a commercial subsidiary Micro Health Simulations.
