= Cyril Isenberg =

British physicist

MBE Cyril Isenberg
- Scientific career
- Fields: Physics
- Workplaces: University of Kent

Cyril Isenberg is an English physicist at the University of Kent, where he is an Honorary Lecturer.

Isenberg is known for pioneering the analog computing possibilities of soap bubbles; in 2012, his 1976 article on the subject was one of a set of "classic articles" selected by American Scientist to celebrate their centennial. He has also frequently given physics lectures to schoolchildren and appeared in television shows, and is the organizer of the British Physics Olympiad. He is the author of books The Science of Soap Films and Soap Bubbles (Dover, 1978) and Physics Experiments and Projects for Students (with S. Chomet, Taylor & Francis, 1989 & 1996).

In 1994, Isenberg won the Lawrence Bragg Medal and Prize of the Institute of Physics for his contributions to physics education. In 2008, he became a Member of the Order of the British Empire.
