= Du Boulay =

Du Boulay is a surname, and may refer to:

- Arthur du Boulay (1880–1918), British military officer
- César-Egasse du Boulay (died 1678), French historian
- Clair du Boulay, British expert in pathology and medical education
- F. R. H. Du Boulay (1920–2008), British medieval historian
- Francis Houssemayne du Boulay (1837–1914), Australian naturalist and musician
- François Jacques Houssemayne Du Boulay (1759–1828), British financier
- Henry Du Boulay (1840–1925), Archdeacon of Bodmin, Cornwall
- James Houssemayne Du Boulay (1868–1943), British civil servant in India
- Sir Roger Du Boulay (1922–2020), British diplomat
- Shirley du Boulay (1933–2023), British author and biographer
- Benedict du Boulay, British computer scientist

== See also ==
- Boulay
