= Boulay =

Boulay is a surname, and may refer to:

- Antoine Jacques Claude Joseph, comte Boulay de la Meurthe (1761–1840), French politician and magistrate
- Diana Boulay (born 1946), Canadian artist
- Étienne Boulay (born 1983), Canadian football player
- Francine Boulay-Parizeau (born 1953), former Canadian handball player
- Herménégilde Boulay (1861–1942), Canadian politician, farmer, manufacturer, merchant and trader
- Isabelle Boulay (born 1972), francophone Canadian pop singer
- Joséphine Boulay (1869–1925), French organist and composer
- Mathieu Boulay (born 1987), Canadian football player
- Olivier Boulay (born 1957), French automobile designer
- Jean-Luc Boulay (born 1955), French and Canadian chef, restaurateur, Officer of the Ordre du Mérite Agricole de France, television personality in Quebec.

== See also ==
- Du Boulay
- Boulay-les-Barres, Loiret, France
- Boulay-les-Ifs, Mayenne, France
- Boulay-Moselle, France, which gave its name to the Fortified Sector of Boulay
- Île Boulay, island near Abidjan, Côte d'Ivoire
- Le Boulay, Indre–et-Loire, France
- Le Boulay-Morin, Eure, France
