= 2018–19 Coupe de France preliminary rounds, Auvergne-Rhône-Alpes =

The 2018–19 Coupe de France preliminary rounds, Auvergne-Rhône-Alpes was the qualifying competition to decide which teams from the leagues of the Auvergne-Rhône-Alpes region of France took part in the main competition from the seventh round.

== First round ==
These matches were played on 25 and 26 August 2018.

First round results: Auvergne-Rhône-Alpes
| Tie no | Home team (tier) | Score | Away team (tier) |
|---|---|---|---|
| 1. | Olympique Albertville FC (9) | 1–0 (Note: Olympique Albertville FC penalised after fielding too many transferred players. JS Chambéry qualify. Original scoreline 1–0.) | JS Chambéry (8) |
| 2. | US Pontoise (9) | 0–2 | Nivolet FC (8) |
| 3. | Biollay Pro FC (9) | 3–6 | FC Chambotte (8) |
| 4. | US Grand Mont La Bâthie (11) | 1–1 (3–5 p) | Feyzin Club Belle Étoile (9) |
| 5. | Montmélian AF (9) | 0–4 | CA Maurienne (8) |
| 6. | FC St Michel-de-Maurienne (11) | 1–2 | ES Drumettaz-Mouxy (9) |
| 7. | USC Aiguebelle (11) | 0–3 | AS Cuines-La Chambre Val d'Arc (10) |
| 8. | Marthod Sport (12) | 1–2 | FC St Baldoph (10) |
| 9. | FC Haute Tarentaise (10) | 1–2 | Cognin Sports (9) |
| 10. | CA Yenne (11) | 4–2 | US Motteraine (9) |
| 11. | FC La Rochette (12) | 1–0 | Chambéry Sport 73 (9) |
| 12. | Cœur de Savoie (11) | 1–2 | US Chartreuse Guiers (9) |
| 13. | Chamoux SF (13) | 0–8 | FC Beaufortain Queige (12) |
| 14. | AS Brison-St Innocent (11) | 0–1 | US La Ravoire (10) |
| 15. | FC Villargondran (11) | 1–0 (a.e.t.) | AS Ugine (9) |
| 16. | FC Bauges (12) | 2–1 | US Modane (10) |
| 17. | AS Novalaise (10) | 0–2 | Entente Val d'Hyères (9) |
| 18. | Ste Hélène FC (11) | 2–1 | FC Laissaud (10) |
| 19. | US Ruy-Montceau (11) | 0–1 | US Sassenage (8) |
| 20. | FC Canton de Vinay | 0–3 | US Mours (9) |
| 21. | FC St Quentinois (11) | 0–1 | US Jarrie-Champ (8) |
| 22. | US Ro-Claix (11) | 1–0 | ES Manival (8) |
| 23. | Formafoot Bièvre Valloire (11) | 0–4 | OC Eybens (8) |
| 24. | CF Estrablin (10) | 0–1 (a.e.t.) | ES Rachais (8) |
| 25. | FC Voiron-Moirans (10) | 0–1 | AS Ver Sau (8) |
| 26. | FC Minier (11) | 3–0 | AS Espinat (9) |
| 27. | US Cère et Landes (11) | 1–2 | Sud Cantal Foot (9) |
| 28. | FC Albepierre-Bredons (12) | 1–2 | Cère FC Vic/Polminhac (9) |
| 29. | FC Hauts de Cère (12) | 1–3 | AS Belbexoise (10) |
| 30. | US Besse (11) | 0–1 | ES Riomois-Condat (9) |
| 31. | ES Roannaise (12) | 2–3 | FC Junhac-Montsalvy (10) |
| 32. | CS Vézac (10) | 3–0 | FC des Quatre Vallées (9) |
| 33. | US Haut-Célé (11) | 0–2 | Parlan-Le Rouget FC (9) |
| 34. | Cézallier Alagnon FC (12) | 0–5 | ES Margeride (11) |
| 35. | Jordanne FC (13) | 4–2 | FC Artense (9) |
| 36. | Espoir Molinetois (10) | 4–2 (a.e.t.) | AS Lurcy-Lévis (9) |
| 37. | US Trezelles (10) | 4–4 (2–4 p) | FC Billy-Crechy (9) |
| 38. | AS Trizacoise (12) | 0–3 | AS Sansacoise (8) |
| 39. | Saignes FC (10) | 0–1 | FC Massiac-Molompize-Blesle (8) |
| 40. | ES Vebret-Ydes (11) | 1–2 | US Murat (9) |
| 41. | US Saulzet-Escurolles (10) | 1–4 | AS Dompierroise (8) |
| 42. | AS Val de Sioule (11) | 1–2 | AS Le Breuil (10) |
| 43. | US Cœur Allier (10) | 0–7 | Médiéval Club Montluçonnais (10) |
| 44. | AS Neuilly-le-Réal (10) | 2–1 | SC Gannat (9) |
| 45. | AS Mercy-Chapeau (10) | 1–7 | AS Gennetinoise (10) |
| 46. | ES St Plaisir (12) | 0–6 | US Malicorne (10) |
| 47. | AS Salignoise (11) | 1–6 | JS Neuvy (9) |
| 48. | US Bien-Assis Montluçon (10) | 2–3 | AC Creuzier-le-Vieux (8) |
| 49. | AS Cérilly (9) | 1–5 | US Vendat (8) |
| 50. | SC Ygrandais (10) | 0–1 | FC Souvigny (9) |
| 51. | AS Billezois (10) | 3–4 (a.e.t.) | Ballon Beaulonnais (9) |
| 52. | ES St Étienne-de-Vicq/Bost (12) | 1–4 | CS Bessay (9) |
| 53. | AS Toulonnaise (9) | 2–1 | Commentary FC (8) |
| 54. | OC Montenay-sur-Allier (11) | 1–6 | SC Avermes (9) |
| 55. | US Varennes-sur-Tèche (10) | 2–3 | Étoile Moulins Yzeure (9) |
| 56. | US Biachette Désertines (10) | 3–0 | AS Tronget (9) |
| 57. | Montluçon FC (11) | 3–5 | AS Villebret (10) |
| 58. | FR Pouzy-Mésangy (11) | 2–4 (a.e.t.) | AS Louchy (9) |
| 59. | SC Charmes 2000 (11) | 2–9 | Stade St Yorre (9) |
| 60. | Bourbon Sportif (9) | 5–1 | AS Varennes-sur-Allier (8) |
| 61. | FC Haut d'Allier (9) | 2–4 | US Lignerolles-Lavault Ste Anne (8) |
| 62. | US Saulcet-Le Theil (10) | 2–2 (4–5 p) | CS Cosne d'Allier (9) |
| 63. | US St Victor (10) | 1–2 | US Vallon (9) |
| 64. | Magnet-Suillet-St Gérand (10) | 3–4 (a.e.t.) | Bézenet-Doyet Foot (8) |
| 65. | US St Désiré (11) | 0–2 | ES Vernetoise (9) |
| 66. | AS Riotordoise (12) | 0–11 | US Sucs et Lignon (8) |
| 67. | FC Vézézoux (10) | 0–1 | AS St Didier-St Just (8) |
| 68. | AS La Roche-Blanche (11) | 0–2 | AS Moissat (10) |
| 69. | FF Chappes (11) | 0–4 | AS St Genès-Champanelle (8) |
| 70. | AS Joze (11) | 3–0 (Note: Tie won by forfeit.) | Aulnat Sportif (11) |
| 71. | US Landos (10) | 2–2 (3–4 p) | US Arsac-en-Velay (9) |
| 72. | AS Villettoise (10) | 2–0 | FC St Germain Laprade (9) |
| 73. | AS Mazet-Chambon (11) | 3–3 (4–2 p) | FC Aurec (9) |
| 74. | AS Cheminots Langeac (10) | 1–5 | FC Dunières (9) |
| 75. | AS Grazac-Lapte (9) | 2–3 | AS Loudes (8) |
| 76. | FC Arzon (10) | 2–1 | AG Sigolenoise (10) |
| 77. | OC Ondaine (10) | 2–6 | Olympic St Julien-Chapteuil (8) |
| 78. | Amicale St Jean-de-Nay (12) | 3–2 | US La Chapelle-Laurent (10) |
| 79. | US Lantriac (12) | 1–3 (a.e.t.) | US Bassoise (9) |
| 80. | US Bains-St Christophe (9) | 2–5 | Sauveteurs Brivois (8) |
| 81. | ES St Mamet (9) | 1–1 (5–4 p) | US Crandelles (8) |
| 82. | AS Yolet (10) | 1–2 | ES Pierrefortaise (8) |
| 83. | Aiguilhe FC (12) | 1–2 (a.e.t.) | FC Tence (10) |
| 84. | AS Montfaucon (11) | 2–2 (6–5 p) | AS Pertuis (10) |
| 85. | US Vals Le Puy (11) | 1–3 | Retournac Sportif (8) |
| 86. | AS Tullins-Fures (11) | 1–8 | Olympique Nord Dauphiné (8) |
| 87. | Rives SF (11) | 3–4 | JS St Georgeoise (12) |
| 88. | US La Bâtie-Divisin (12) | 1–1 (3–4 p) | Noyarey FC (11) |
| 89. | US Creys-Morestel (10) | 6–3 (a.e.t.) (Note: Tie switched at the request of both clubs.) | Stade Châbonnais (12) |
| 90. | AC Poisat (12) | 0–4 | US La Murette (9) |
| 91. | AS Fontaine (14) | 1–2 (a.e.t.) | Le Grand-Lemps/Colombe/Apprieu Foot 38 (12) |
| 92. | FC Chirens (12) | 1–5 | AS Vézeronce-Huert (11) |
| 93. | Balbins-Ornacieux-Semons Sports (12) | 0–3 | US Reventin (11) |
| 94. | FC Liers (12) | 4–4 (4–1 p) | Deux Rochers FC (11) |
| 95. | US Beaurepairoise (12) | 4–1 (Note: US Beaurepairoise penalised for fielding a suspended player. FC Sud Isère qualify. Original scoreline 4–1.) | FC Sud Isère (10) |
| 96. | Eyzin St Sorlin FC (13) | 1–5 | ASCOL Foot 38 (12) |
| 97. | Pays d'Allevard (12) | 3–0 | FOC Froges (14) |
| 98. | US Village Olympique Grenoble (13) | 2–0 | CS Miribel (11) |
| 99. | Moirans FC (13) | 2–6 | Olympique Les Avenières (11) |
| 100. | US Flacheroise (13) | 0–7 | CS Faramans (12) |
| 101. | AS Grésivaudan (11) | 2–0 | FC Seyssins (10) |
| 102. | AS Susville-Matheysine (12) | 3–1 | FC Bilieu (11) |
| 103. | CS Four (11) | 0–1 | AL St Maurice-l'Exil (9) |
| 104. | Amicale Tunisienne St Martin-d'Hères (11) | 1–3 | CS Voreppe (9) |
| 105. | FC Crolles-Bernin (11) | 1–2 | AJA Villeneuve (9) |
| 106. | FC St Martin d'Uriage (12) | 3–1 | US St Paul-de-Varces (11) |
| 107. | FC Vallée Bleue (12) | 3–2 (a.e.t.) | FC Allobroges Asafia (10) |
| 108. | AS Cheyssieu (12) | 2–0 | EF des Étangs (11) |
| 109. | US Montgasconnaise (12) | 2–1 | CS Nivolas (10) |
| 110. | FC La Sure (11) | 5–1 | Union Nord Iséroise (10) |
| 111. | US Beauvoir-Royas (12) | 2–2 (4–3 p) | Olympique Villefontaine (11) |
| 112. | AS St Lattier (12) | 1–4 | FC Varèze (9) |
| 113. | FC Lauzes (11) | 0–6 | AS Domarin (9) |
| 114. | FC Balmes Nord-Isère (10) | 3–4 | AS St André-le-Gaz (9) |
| 115. | MJC St Hilaire-de-la-Côte (12) | 2–2 (2–3 p) | Artas Charantonnay FC (11) |
| 116. | US Courpière (9) | 4–3 | Durolle Foot (8) |
| 117. | ALS Besse Egliseneuve (9) | 3–1 | FC Châtel-Guyon (8) |
| 118. | US Menat-Neuf-Eglise (11) | 0–3 | AS Orcines (10) |
| 119. | CS St Anthème (12) | 1–4 (a.e.t.) | SC Billom (9) |
| 120. | US Chapdes-Beaufort (11) | 1–4 | FC Nord Limagne (10) |
| 121. | US Marcillat-Pionsat (10) | 1–2 | EFC St Amant-Tallende (8) |
| 122. | ES Saint-Maurice-ès-Allier (11) | 3–0 | FC Bromont-Lamothe/Montfermy (11) |
| 123. | Entente Charblot (11) | 3–0 | FC Mézel (10) |
| 124. | US Gerzat (10) | 4–4 (2–4 p) | AS Livradois Sud (9) |
| 125. | CO Veyre-Monton (10) | 0–2 | AI St Babel (8) |
| 126. | US Orcet (9) | 1–0 | AS Enval-Marsat (8) |
| 127. | RS Luzillat-Charnat-Vinzelles (10) | 0–3 | Espérance Ceyratois Football (8) |
| 128. | FC Sayat-Argnat (9) | 2–3 (a.e.t.) | US Maringues (8) |
| 129. | US St Sylvestre-Pragoulin (12) | 1–5 | Clermont Métropole FC (9) |
| 130. | RC St Clément-de-Régnat (11) | 4–1 | FC Nord Combraille (10) |
| 131. | US Corbelin (11) | 0–4 | AS Italienne Européenne Grenoble (10) |
| 132. | FC des Collines (11) | 2–1 (a.e.t.) | AS Martinerois (9) |
| 133. | ASJF Domène (11) | 4–2 (a.e.t.) | FC Versoud (10) |
| 134. | ES Fillinges (10) | 0–2 | FC Cruseilles (8) |
| 135. | Échenevex-Ségny-Chevry Olympique (10) | 1–0 | US Annemasse-Gaillard (8) |
| 136. | FC Lezoux (9) | 2–4 | FC Aubierois (9) |
| 137. | ES Couze Pavin (11) | 2–3 | Pérignat FC (9) |
| 138. | Haut Giffre FC (10) | 4–5 | US Mont Blanc (8) |
| 139. | ES Valleiry (10) | 0–3 | ES Chilly (8) |
| 140. | CSA Poisy (10) | 2–1 | ES Amancy (8) |
| 141. | FC St Julien-de-Coppel (10) | 1–4 | ES St Germinoise (8) |
| 142. | FC Paslières-Noalhat (12) | 0–2 | AS Haute-Dordogne (10) |
| 143. | FC Issoire 2 (11) | 1–4 | AS Job (10) |
| 144. | US Tours-sur-Meymont (12) | 3–3 (3–2 p) | US Val de Couze Chambon (10) |
| 145. | ES St Rémy-sur-Durolle (11) | 1–3 | FC Vertaizon (8) |
| 146. | CSA Brassacois Florinois (10) | 2–1 | US St Gervaisienne (9) |
| 147, | AS St Ours (10) | 1–0 | La Combelle CAB (8) |
| 148. | EC Lembronnais (12) | 0–2 | RAS Beauregard l'Évêque (9) |
| 149. | AS Cunlhat (11) | 0–5 | US Les Martres-d'Artière (9) |
| 150. | ES Volcans Malauzat (11) | 0–1 | CS St Bonnet-près-Riom (10) |
| 151. | US Limons (10) | 0–7 | US Mozac (9) |
| 152. | ES St Sauves-Tauves (12) | 0–2 | FC Mirefleurs (11) |
| 153. | FC Plauzat-Champeix (10) | 1–4 | AS Romagnat (8) |
| 154. | CS Pont-de-Dore (11) | 0–9 | AGuiRA FC (10) |
| 155. | RC Laqueuille (12) | 1–3 | Dômes-Sancy Foot (9) |
| 156. | AS Cellule (10) | 0–0 (19–18 p) | JS St Priest-des-Champs (8) |
| 157. | ASC Ouvoimoja (11) | 1–2 | AS Royat (10) |
| 158. | Ecureuils Franc Rosier (10) | 6–1 | RC Charbonnières-Paugnat (10) |
| 159. | FC Blanzat (10) | 0–1 | US Les Martres-de-Veyre (8) |
| 160. | US Ennezat (9) | 4–5 | UJ Clermontoise (8) |
| 161. | US Lussas (13) | 1–1 (3–4 p) | AS Roussas-Granges-Gontardes (11) |
| 162. | US Vallée du Jabron (10) | 0–4 | Rhône Crussol Foot 07 (9) |
| 163. | AS Vernoux (13) | 0–1 | FC La Coucourde (13) |
| 164. | FC Cheylarois (11) | 5–2 | EA Montvendre (11) |
| 165. | AS Portugais Annecy (12) | 2–6 | CS Ayze (10) |
| 166. | JS Livron (12) | 2–1 | FC Goubetois (11) |
| 167. | FC Bren (12) | 2–5 (a.e.t.) | AS Vallée du Doux (11) |
| 168. | AS Homenetmen Bourg-lès Valence (11) | 0–2 | FC Tricastin (8) |
| 169. | FC Hermitage (11) | 2–2 (2–4 p) | FC Montélimar (9) |
| 170. | CO Donzère (12) | 0–1 | US Portes Hautes Cévennes (8) |
| 171. | FC Vallon-Pont-d'Arc (12) | 3–2 | CO Châteauneuf-du-Rhône (12) |
| 172. | FC Hauterives/US Grand-Serre (11) | 2–3 | RC Mauves (10) |
| 173. | FC Larnage-Serves (11) | 2–1 | AS Portugaise Valence (10) |
| 174. | Olympique St Montanais (11) | 0–2 | AS Vanséenne (11) |
| 175. | FC Alboussière (12) | 0–4 | FC Châtelet (10) |
| 176. | FC Félines-St Cyr-Peaugres (11) | 1–4 | CO Châteauneuvois (10) |
| 177. | FC Bourg-lès-Valence (10) | 0–2 | Olympique Ruomsois (9) |
| 178. | Independante Blacheroise (12) | 1–3 | JS St Privat (11) |
| 179. | ES Boulieu-lès-Annonay (11) | 7–0 | AS St Marcelloise (12) |
| 180. | Diois FC (12) | 0–3 | AS Cornas (10) |
| 181. | AJ Chabrillan (13) | 1–1 (5–4 p) | AS St Priest 07 (12) |
| 182. | US Peyrins (13) | 8–3 | US Pailharès-Lalouvesc (13) |
| 183. | FC Rochegudien (12) | 2–1 | US Montmeyran (11) |
| 184. | ES Trèfle (13) | 4–2 | ASL Génissieux (11) |
| 185. | FC Portois (10) | 2–1 | Espérance Hostunoise (11) |
| 186. | Borussia Valence FC (14) | 1–2 | SC Bourguesan (11) |
| 187. | FC Rochepaule (13) | 0–4 | US Montélier (12) |
| 188. | AS La Sanne (13) | 0–2 | ES Chomérac (11) |
| 189. | FC Clérieux-St Bardoux-Granges-les-Beaumont (13) | 3–1 | JS Allexoise (11) |
| 190. | FC Bathernay (none) | void (Note: FC Bathernay withdrew. ES Malissardoise play FC St Restitut (see tie 374).) | ES Malissardoise |
| 191. | AS Coucouron (11) | 0–1 | AS Berg-Helvie (10) |
| 192. | US St Gervais-sur-Roubion (12) | 1–1 (8–9 p) | RC Tournon-Tain (11) |
| 193. | CS Lapeyrousien (13) | 2–8 | AS St Barthélemy-Grozon (11) |
| 194. | FC St Restitut (13) | void (Note: Vivar SC Soyons withdrew. FC St Restitut play ES Malissardoise (see tie 374).) | Vivar SC Soyons (none) |
| 195. | FC Baume-Montségur (12) | 1–2 | US Rochemaure (12) |
| 196. | US St Martin-de-Valamas (12) | 2–2 (6–5 p) | ES Nord Drôme (11) |
| 197. | AS Cancoise (12) | 1–0 | US Pont-La Roche (10) |
| 198. | OS Vallée de l'Ouvèze (12) | 0–1 | US Ancône (11) |
| 199. | US Vals-les-Bains (10) | 0–3 | Valence FC (8) |
| 200. | PS Romanaise (10) | 0–3 | FC Chabeuil (8) |
| 201. | FC Muzolais (11) | 0–2 | Entente Crest-Aouste (8) |
| 202. | AS Valensolles (10) | 2–0 | ASF Pierrelatte (9) |
| 203. | RC Savasson (12) | 0–6 | US St Just-St Marcel (11) |
| 204. | AS Dolon (10) | 1–4 | FC Péageois (8) |
| 205. | US Baixoise (12) | 4–3 (a.e.t.) | FC St Didier-sous-Aubenas (11) |
| 206. | IF Barbières-Bésayes-Rochefort-Samson-Marches (11) | 1–2 | US Val d'Ay (10) |
| 207. | CS Châteauneuf-de-Galaure (12) | 3–2 | US 2 Vallons (12) |
| 208. | ES Beaumonteleger (11) | 1–3 | US Croix du Fraysse (11) |
| 209. | FC 540 (11) | 1–5 | FC Eyrieux Embroye (9) |
| 210. | FC Serrières-Sablons (10) | 3–2 | AS Véore Montoison (9) |
| 211. | FR Allan (10) | 2–1 | SC Romans (11) |
| 212. | Olympique Centre Ardèche (9) | 0–4 | AS Donatienne (8) |
| 213. | ES St Jeure-d'Ay-Marsan (12) | 0–2 | Entente Sarras Sports St Vallier (9) |
| 214. | AS Marin (11) | 8–2 | FC Carroz d'Arâches (12) |
| 215. | Foot Sud 74 (11) | 1–2 | FC Thônes (9) |
| 216. | Association Chandieu-Heyrieux (9) | 2–0 | FC Annonay (8) |
| 217. | FC Chanas (10) | 2–3 | US Millery-Vourles (8) |
| 218. | Olympiqe St Quentinois (10) | 0–0 (4–2 p) | Olympique Rhodia (9) |
| 219. | AS Diémoz (11) | 1–3 | US Davézieux-Vidalon (10) |
| 220. | FC Lamure Poule (10) | 1–2 | Sud Lyonnais Foot (8) |
| 221. | CS Vacheresse Vallée d'Abondance (12) | 2–8 | AJ Ville-la-Grand (11) |
| 222. | AS Ferney-Voltaire (12) | 2–1 (a.e.t.) | AS Prévessin-Moëns (11) |
| 223. | AS Épagny-Metz-Tessy (12) | 0–9 | FC La Filière (11) |
| 224. | Arthaz Sports (12) | 2–3 | UC Turque Thonon-les-Bains (11) |
| 225. | AS Italienne Annecy (12) | 1–0 | ES Cernex (10) |
| 226. | FC Villy-le-Pelloux (13) | 0–6 | FC Léman Presqu'île (12) |
| 227. | FC Anthy Sport (13) | 0–2 | FC Arenthon-Scientrier (12) |
| 228. | FC Les Houches-Servoz (13) | 1–10 | CS Megève (12) |
| 229. | CS Chamonix (12) | 0–3 | FC Cluses (10) |
| 230. | CSL Perrignier (12) | 5–0 | AS Thonon (13) |
| 231. | FC Haut-Rhône (12) | 0–6 | US Argonay (10) |
| 232. | CS Veigy-Foncenex (12) | 1–5 | ES Viry (11) |
| 233. | AS Sillingy (10) | 0–0 (8–9 p) | AG Bons-en-Chablais (9) |
| 234. | AS Évires (12) | 1–4 | CS La Balme-de-Sillingy (10) |
| 235. | FC Semine (12) | 2–3 | CO Chavanod (11) |
| 236. | US Challex (11) | 1–1 (3–4 p) | US Divonne (9) |
| 237. | AS Parmelan Villaz (11) | 0–4 | ES Thyez (10) |
| 238. | ASC Sallanches (10) | 3–1 | Marignier Sports (9) |
| 239. | US Vétraz-Monthoux (12) | 0–6 | FC Foron (9) |
| 240. | Olympique Cran (10) | 1–0 | FC Frangy (11) |
| 241. | FC Gavot (11) | 2–1 | FC Évian (12) |
| 242. | FC Vuache (12) | 2–3 | ES Meythet (11) |
| 243. | Beaumont Collonges FC (10) | 1–3 | ES Seynod (8) |
| 244. | US Pers-Jussy (12) | 1–4 | ES Clusienne (11) |
| 245. | FRS Champanges (12) | 1–3 | SC Morzine Vallée d'Aulps (10) |
| 246. | FC Cessy-Gex (11) | 3–2 (a.e.t.) | AS St Genis-Ferney-Crozet (9) |
| 247. | US Margencel (10) | 1–4 | JS Reignier (9) |
| 248. | ES Douvaine-Loisin (12) | 4–3 | ES St Jeoire-La Tour (10) |
| 249. | CS St Pierre (10) | 1–5 | FC Chéran (9) |
| 250. | AS Le Lyaud-Armoy (12) | 1–3 | FJ Ambilly (9) |
| 251. | FC Cranves-Sales (11) | 1–2 | FC Ballaison (9) |
| 252. | ES Lanfonnet (11) | 0–3 | US Pringy (9) |
| 253. | FC Marcellaz-Albanais (11) | 0–3 | US Semnoz-Vieugy (9) |
| 254. | ES Sciez (11) | 1–4 | Football Sud Gessien (10) |
| 255. | FC Dombes (10) | 3–4 (a.e.t.) | CS Lagnieu (8) |
| 256. | FO Bourg-en-Bresse (9) | 0–2 | AS Montréal-la-Cluse (8) |
| 257. | Olympique Sud Revermont 01 (10) | 3–5 | ES Foissiat-Étrez (8) |
| 258. | US Replonges (10) | 0–3 | US Nantua (8) |
| 259. | Concordia FC Bellegarde (9) | 1–0 | US Culoz Grand Colombier (8) |
| 260. | Fareins Saône Vallée Foot (10) | 3–5 | FC Bressans (8) |
| 261. | FC Bord de Veyle (11) | 1–5 | ES Val de Saône (10) |
| 262. | US Dombes-Chalamont (11) | 2–1 | FC Mas-Rillier (12) |
| 263. | FC Serrières-Villebois (11) | 1–2 | FC Bords de l'Ain (9) |
| 264. | CS Chevroux (12) | 1–0 | AS Chaveyriat-Chanoz (11) |
| 265. | Bourg Sud (11) | 4–1 | AS St Étienne-sur-Reyssouze (10) |
| 266. | FC Nurieux-Volognat (11) | 1–2 | Plaine Revermont Foot (10) |
| 267. | FC Manziat (11) | 1–2 | AS Montrevelloise (9) |
| 268. | FC Veyle-Vieux-Jonc (11) | 1–3 | FC Côtière-Luenaz (9) |
| 269. | AS Vertrieu (11) | 3–4 | SC Portes de l'Ain (9) |
| 270. | ES Revermontoise (10) | 2–0 | FC Dombes-Bresse (9) |
| 271. | US St Cyr (12) | 6–5 (a.e.t.) | US Vonnas (11) |
| 272. | AS Guéreins-Genouilleux (12) | 2–1 | AS Grièges-Pont-de-Veyle (10) |
| 273. | Olympique Buyatin (12) | 5–1 | US Tenay (11) |
| 274. | Vallis Auréa Foot (10) | 2–2 (3–5 p) | FC Bourguisan (10) |
| 275. | FC Curtafond-Confrançon-St Martin-St Didier (11) | 1–3 | AS Bâgé-le-Châtel (10) |
| 276. | ES Cormoranche (11) | 2–0 | US Pont-de-Vaux-Arbigny (10) |
| 277. | FC Priay (11) | 3–0 | CS Belley (10) |
| 278. | AS Montmerle (11) | 1–4 | Jassans-Frans Foot (9) |
| 279. | US Veyziat (10) | 1–8 | US Arbent Marchon (9) |
| 280. | CSJ Châtillonnaise (11) | 3–2 | SC Mille Étangs (11) |
| 281. | JS Bresse Dombes (13) | 1–3 | AS Attignat (11) |
| 282. | US Izernore (11) | 1–4 | FC de la Plaine de l'Ain (11) |
| 283. | Valserine FC (10) | 2–3 | AS Travailleurs Turcs Oyonnax (11) |
| 284. | FC Injoux-Génissiat (13) | 1–1 (6–7 p) | AS Hautecourt-Romanèche (11) |
| 285. | St Denis-Ambutrix FC (11) | 0–5 | Oyonnax Plastics Vallée FC (9) |
| 286. | Olympique St Étienne (13) | 0–1 | Haut Pilat Interfoot (11) |
| 287. | AS Boën-Trelins (13) | 2–3 | ES Haut Forez (11) |
| 288. | FC Marcellinois (13) | 1–3 | FC Montrambert Ricamar (11) |
| 289. | FC Bords de Loire (12) | 4–1 | St Étienne UC Terrenoire (11) |
| 290. | Olympique du Montcel (11) | 2–4 | AS St Just-St Rambert (9) |
| 291. | Forez Donzy FC (10) | 4–3 | GS Dervaux Chambon-Feugerolles (8) |
| 292. | US Metare St Étienne Sud-Est (10) | 0–8 (Note: Match abandoned at half time, with the scoreline 0–8, due to US Metare St Étienne Sud-Est being reduced to less than 8 players. AS Savigneux-Montbrison qualify.) | AS Savigneux-Montbrison (8) |
| 293. | AS Chambéon-Magneux (9) | 0–1 | AS Châteauneuf (8) |
| 294. | AC Rive-de-Gier (9) | 0–1 (a.e.t.) | US Villars (8) |
| 295. | Feu Vert St Chamond (11) | 0–3 | FC St Étienne (9) |
| 296. | JS Cellieu (10) | 1–1 (5–3 p) | ES La Talaudière (8) |
| 297. | AS Couzan (10) | 0–5 | L'Étrat-La Tour Sportif (8) |
| 298. | Bellegarde Sports (10) | 0–2 | USG La Fouillouse (8) |
| 299. | US Villerest (10) | 3–4 (a.e.t.) | SEL St Priest-en-Jarez (8) |
| 300. | AS Jonzieux (10) | 1–6 | US St Galmier-Chambœuf (8) |
| 301. | ES Genas Azieu (10) | 1–0 | CS Vaulxois (11) |
| 302. | St Alban Sportif (11) | 2–4 | Lyon Ouest SC (9) |
| 303. | JS Irigny (10) | 4–0 | AS Denicé (11) |
| 304. | FC St Cyr Collonges au Mont d'Or (10) | 3–0 | Olympic Sathonay (11) |
| 305. | US L'Horme (12) | 2–8 | AF Pays de Coise (10) |
| 306. | US Loire-sur-Rhône (10) | 4–0 | AS Portugaise Vaulx-en-Velin (11) |
| 307. | CS Ozon (11) | 0–4 | AS Buers Villeurbanne (10) |
| 308. | FC Colombier-Satolas (11) | 1–3 | AS Bellecour-Perrache (8) |
| 309. | FC Corbas (9) | 1–3 | FC Chaponnay-Marennes (8) |
| 310. | AS Manissieux (9) | 1–6 | FC Pontcharra-St Loup (8) |
| 311. | RC Beligny (10) | 0–3 | CO St Fons (8) |
| 312. | AS Grézieu-le-Marché (11) | 2–1 | Haute Brévenne Foot (9) |
| 313. | US Est Lyonnais (9) | 5–5 (4–5 p) | US Meyzieu (8) |
| 314. | AL Mions (9) | 0–3 | AS Montchat Lyon (8) |
| 315. | AS Sornins Réunis (11) | 1–0 | Sud Azergues Foot (10) |
| 316. | ES Chaponost (10) | 3–4 | FC Grigny (9) |
| 317. | Muroise Foot (11) | – (Note: Match abandoned after 80 minutes by the referee, with the scoreline 2–0, after a mass fight between players. The League committee penalised both teams and removed them from both from the competition) | Latino AFC Lyon (12) |
| 318. | AS St Forgeux (10) | 3–0 | US Formans (11) |
| 319. | Chambost-Allières-St Just-d'Avray (10) | 3–0 | ASM St Pierre-la-Palud (11) |
| 320. | US Vaulx-en-Velin (10) | 0–2 | SO Pont-de-Chéruy-Chavanoz (8) |
| 321. | AS Rhodanienne (10) | 0–2 | AS Algerienne Villeurbanne (9) |
| 322. | Beaujolais Football (9) | 3–4 (a.e.t.) | USF Tarare (10) |
| 323. | GS Chasse-sur-Rhône (10) | 2–5 | AS Villefontaine (9) |
| 324. | US Des Monts (12) | 1–5 | FC Sud Ouest 69 (10) |
| 325. | FC St Fons (12) | 1–3 | Eveil Lyon (11) |
| 326. | FC Croix Roussien (11) | 0–0 (4–2 p) | AS St Martin-en-Haut (10) |
| 327. | Entente Odenas-Charentay-St Lager (10) | 0–0 (4–2 p) | Ménival FC (9) |
| 328. | CS Verpillière (9) | 2–2 (3–5 p) | FC Sévenne (10) |
| 329. | FC Antillais Villeurbanne (12) | 2–0 (a.e.t.) | FC St Romain-en-Gal (12) |
| 330. | UGA Lyon-Décines (9) | 2–3 (a.e.t.) | FC Franchevilloise (11) |
| 331. | Stade Amplepuisien (9) | 2–3 | FC Val Lyonnais (8) |
| 332. | Chazay FC (10) | 2–1 | FC Point du Jour (11) |
| 333. | ACS Mayotte du Rhône (10) | 3–0 | CS Anatolia (11) |
| 334. | FC Rontalon (13) | 2–3 | US Reneins Vauxonne (11) |
| 335. | CS Meginand (9) | 6–0 | Lyon Croix Rousse Football (10) |
| 336. | ES Lierguoise (10) | 2–6 | UO Tassin-la-Demi-Lune (11) |
| 337. | FC Rive Droite (10) | 1–2 | ES Gleizé (11) |
| 338. | AS Toussieu (12) | 5–2 (a.e.t.) | US Montanay (11) |
| 339. | SC Maccabi Lyon (11) | 2–3 | Olympique Rillieux (10) |
| 340. | AS Craponne (9) | 1–2 | CS Neuville (8) |
| 341. | US Vaux-en-Bugey (12) | 1–7 | ES Frontonas-Chamagnieu (11) |
| 342. | FC Deux Fontaines (11) | 2–0 | FC Comoriens de Lyon (12) |
| 343. | FC Franc Lyonnais (11) | 2–2 (3–0 p) | AS Villeurbanne Éveil Lyonnais (9) |
| 344. | CAS Cheminots Oullins Lyon (10) | 2–3 (a.e.t.) | Caluire SC (8) |
| 345. | Rhône Sud FC (11) | 2–1 | ES Charly Foot (10) |
| 346. | ABH FC (13) | 6–10 | AS Finerbal (12) |
| 347. | FC Belmont-de-la-Loire (none) | 1–5 | FC Ouches (12) |
| 348. | AS Noirétable (12) | 0–0 (3–5 p) | Riorges FC (10) |
| 349. | US St Georges-Haute-Ville (12) | 0–6 | US Briennon (10) |
| 350. | FC Lézigneux (12) | 1–0 | Sury SC (11) |
| 351. | US Ecotay-Moingt (11) | 3–2 | SC Grand-Croix/Lorette (9) |
| 352. | ES Montrondaise (11) | 5–0 | Olympique Le Coteau (10) |
| 353. | FC Val d'Aix (10) | 1–3 | Entente Plaine Montagne (12) |
| 354. | Nord Roannais (11) | 2–0 | Roanne AS Parc du Sport (9) |
| 355. | St Romain-les-Atheux Sports (13) | 1–2 | AS Astrée (12) |
| 356. | FC Boisset-Chalain (11) | 3–3 (4–5 p) | US Renaisonnaise Apchonnaise (10) |
| 357. | ES Sorbiers (11) | 1–3 | FC St Paul-en-Jarez (9) |
| 358. | Olympique Est Roannais (11) | 1–2 | FC Roanne Clermont (9) |
| 359. | FC St Joseph-St Martin (11) | 7–1 | AS St Ferréol-Gampille-Firminy (11) |
| 360. | AS St Cyr-les-Vignes (11) | 1–6 | FC Chazelles (9) |
| 361. | SC Piraillon (12) | 0–2 | AS Aveizieux (11) |
| 362. | SS Ussonaise (12) | 0–2 | US Sud Forézienne (10) |
| 363. | FC Perreux (11) | 1–2 | FC Commelle-Vernay (9) |
| 364. | CO La Rivière (12) | 3–3 (4–2 p) | ES St Christo-Marcenod (11) |
| 365. | St Jean Sport (11) | 3–4 | AJ Chapellois (11) |
| 366. | AS Parigny (12) | 5–5 (4–5 p) | ACL Mably (11) |
| 367. | FC Plaine Poncins (12) | 1–0 | FC Loire Sornin (11) |
| 368. | AS St Laurent-la-Conche (12) | 0–7 | Olympique Belleroche Villefranche (8) |
| 369. | AS St Haon-le-Vieux (12) | 0–1 | FCI St Romain-le-Puy (10) |
| 370. | SC St Sixte (12) | 1–2 | FC Luriecq (11) |
| 371. | FC Montagnes du Matin (11) | 1–2 | ES Champdieu-Marcilly (9) |
| 372. | ES Dyonisienne (11) | 3–0 | US Neulise Felinoise Gildarienne (11) |
| 373. | FC Montagny (12) | 3–3 (0–3 p) | ES Doizieux-La Terrasse-sur-Dorlay (12) |
| 374. | FC St Restitut (13) | 3–2 | ES Malissardoise (11) |
| 375. | SS Allinges (10) | 2–0 | US Dolomoise (11) |

== Second round ==
These matches were played on 1 and 2 September 2018.

Second round results: Auvergne-Rhône-Alpes
| Tie no | Home team (tier) | Score | Away team (tier) |
|---|---|---|---|
| 1. | US Mozac (9) | 8–0 | Ecureuils Franc Rosier (10) |
| 2. | Olympiqe St Quentinois (10) | 2–1 | Association Chandieu-Heyrieux (9) |
| 3. | AF Pays de Coise (10) | 5–0 | JS Cellieu (10) |
| 4. | Bézenet-Doyet Foot (8) | 7–0 | AS Toulonnaise (9) |
| 5. | Olympique Cran (10) | 1–2 | ES Seynod (8) |
| 6. | ES Margeride (11) | 4–2 | Cère FC Vic/Polminhac (9) |
| 7. | US Murat (9) | 1–0 | Sud Cantal Foot (9) |
| 8. | FC Junhac-Montsalvy (10) | 0–2 (a.e.t.) | Parlan-Le Rouget FC (9) |
| 9. | ES St Germinoise (8) | 1–0 | SC Billom (9) |
| 10. | AS St Ours (10) | 0–5 | US Vic-le-Comte (8) |
| 11. | FC Franc Lyonnais (11) | 1–3 | Feyzin Club Belle Étoile (9) |
| 12. | AG Bons-en-Chablais (9) | 1–3 | ES Chilly (8) |
| 13. | FC Ballaison (9) | 3–0 | US Pringy (9) |
| 14. | RC Tournon-Tain (11) | 0–1 (a.e.t.) | SS Allinges (10) |
| 15. | US Bassoise (9) | 0–2 | FC Dunières (9) |
| 16. | Retournac Sportif (8) | 2–5 | AS Chadrac (8) |
| 17. | AS Mazet-Chambon (11) | 0–2 | Sauveteurs Brivois (8) |
| 18. | Amicale St Jean-de-Nay (12) | 0–9 | AS St Didier-St Just (8) |
| 19. | AS Loudes (8) | 3–1 | US Arsac-en-Velay (9) |
| 20. | AS Montfaucon (11) | 0–7 | Olympic St Julien-Chapteuil (8) |
| 21. | AS Villettoise (10) | 1–6 | US Sucs et Lignon (8) |
| 22. | ES St Mamet (9) | 4–3 | Entente Nord Lozère (8) |
| 23. | FC Minier (11) | 0–2 | AS Sansacoise (8) |
| 24. | AS Belbexoise (10) | 1–1 (3–2 p) | CS Vézac (10) |
| 25. | FC Massiac-Molompize-Blesle (8) | 3–2 | ES Pierrefortaise (8) |
| 26. | AS St Genès-Champanelle (8) | 2–1 | AI St Babel (8) |
| 27. | ALS Besse Egliseneuve (9) | 2–3 (a.e.t.) | EFC St Amant-Tallende (8) |
| 28. | AS Joze (11) | 0–6 | US Les Martres-de-Veyre (8) |
| 29. | FC Mirefleurs (11) | 1–2 | US Issoire (8) |
| 30. | AS Orcines (10) | 2–5 | FC Aubierois (9) |
| 31. | ES Saint-Maurice-ès-Allier (11) | 1–3 | US Orcet (9) |
| 32. | RAS Beauregard l'Évêque (9) | 2–0 | Clermont Métropole FC (9) |
| 33. | AGuiRA FC (10) | 2–0 | US Les Martres-d'Artière (9) |
| 34. | FC Nord Limagne (10) | 0–0 (7–8 p) | AS Livradois Sud (9) |
| 35. | AS Moissat (10) | 2–0 | UJ Clermontoise (8) |
| 36. | Entente Charblot (11) | 0–4 | Espérance Ceyratois Football (8) |
| 37. | FC Vertaizon (8) | 0–2 (a.e.t.) | Dômes-Sancy Foot (9) |
| 38. | RC St Clément-de-Régnat (11) | 2–5 | US Courpière (9) |
| 39. | US Tours-sur-Meymont (12) | 1–2 | AS Haute-Dordogne (10) |
| 40. | CSA Brassacois Florinois (10) | 0–0 (1–3 p) | Pérignat FC (9) |
| 41. | CS St Bonnet-près-Riom (10) | 0–4 | US Maringues (8) |
| 42. | AS Royat (10) | 1–4 | AS Romagnat (8) |
| 43. | FC Roanne Clermont (9) | 3–2 | Étoile Moulins Yzeure (9) |
| 44. | AS Le Breuil (10) | 3–1 | Ballon Beaulonnais (9) |
| 45. | US Vendat (8) | 0–3 | AA Lapalisse (8) |
| 46. | JS Neuvy (9) | 0–6 | Bourbon Sportif (9) |
| 47. | Médiéval Club Montluçonnais (10) | 5–2 | Espoir Molinetois (10) |
| 48. | Stade St Yorre (9) | 1–2 | AS Nord Vignoble (8) |
| 49. | AS Neuilly-le-Réal (10) | 0–1 | CS Bessay (9) |
| 50. | AS Louchy (9) | 2–1 | AS Dompierroise (8) |
| 51. | US Biachette Désertines (10) | 1–2 | AC Creuzier-le-Vieux (8) |
| 52. | US Vallon (9) | 3–0 | ES Vernetoise (9) |
| 53. | AS Gennetinoise (10) | 1–0 | FC Souvigny (9) |
| 54. | SC Avermes (9) | 5–0 | AS Villebret (10) |
| 55. | US Malicorne (10) | 0–3 | US Lignerolles-Lavault Ste Anne (8) |
| 56. | FC Billy-Crechy (9) | 3–1 | CS Cosne d'Allier (9) |
| 57. | Concordia FC Bellegarde (9) | 2–1 | CS Viriat (8) |
| 58. | SC Portes de l'Ain (9) | 6–1 | Ambérieu FC (8) |
| 59. | AS St André-le-Gaz (9) | 0–2 | Olympique St Marcellin (8) |
| 60. | FC Cessy-Gex (11) | 1–2 | CS Amphion Publier (8) |
| 61. | FC Grigny (9) | 0–2 | Olympique St Genis-Laval (8) |
| 62. | ASJF Domène (11) | 0–4 | Vallée du Guiers FC (8) |
| 63. | FC St Paul-en-Jarez (9) | 2–1 (a.e.t.) | Football Mont-Pilat (9) |
| 64. | FC Pays de l'Arbresle (10) | 3–6 | CS Neuville (8) |
| 65. | Nivolet FC (8) | 1–1 (6–7 p) | FC Belle Étoile Mercury (9) |
| 66. | CA Yenne (11) | 1–5 | FC Chambotte (8) |
| 67. | FC St Baldoph (10) | 1–5 | CA Maurienne (8) |
| 68. | ES Drumettaz-Mouxy (9) | 3–0 | US La Ravoire (10) |
| 69. | AS Cuines-La Chambre Val d'Arc (10) | 2–1 | FC Villargondran (11) |
| 70. | FC La Rochette (12) | 9–0 | FC Beaufortain Queige (12) |
| 71. | FC Bauges (12) | 0–6 | US Chartreuse Guiers (9) |
| 72. | Ste Hélène FC (11) | 1–2 | Entente Val d'Hyères (9) |
| 73. | US Mours (9) | 2–1 | US Sassenage (8) |
| 74. | Noyarey FC (11) | 1–2 | US Jarrie-Champ (8) |
| 75. | US Creys-Morestel (10) | 1–2 | US Ro-Claix (11) |
| 76. | US La Murette (9) | 4–1 (a.e.t.) | OC Eybens (8) |
| 77. | JS St Georgeoise (12) | 1–5 | ES Rachais (8) |
| 78. | Le Grand-Lemps/Colombe/Apprieu Foot 38 (12) | 1–4 | AS Ver Sau (8) |
| 79. | US Reventin (11) | 2–1 | Olympique Nord Dauphiné (8) |
| 80. | AS Vézeronce-Huert (11) | 1–0 | Olympique Les Avenières (11) |
| 81. | CS Faramans (12) | 1–0 | FC Liers (12) |
| 82. | ASCOL Foot 38 (12) | 1–2 | US Village Olympique Grenoble (13) |
| 83. | AS Grésivaudan (11) | 3–0 | CS Voreppe (9) |
| 84. | AS Susville-Matheysine (12) | 2–4 | AJA Villeneuve (9) |
| 85. | AS Cheyssieu (12) | 1–9 | AL St Maurice-l'Exil (9) |
| 86. | FC St Martin d'Uriage (12) | 1–0 (a.e.t.) | US Montgasconnaise (12) |
| 87. | FC Vallée Bleue (12) | 1–4 | FC La Sure (11) |
| 88. | US Beauvoir-Royas (12) | 0–6 | AS Domarin (9) |
| 89. | Artas Charantonnay FC (11) | 2–0 | AS Italienne Européenne Grenoble (10) |
| 90. | ES Frontonas-Chamagnieu (11) | 0–1 | FC des Collines (11) |
| 91. | AS Ferney-Voltaire (12) | 1–3 | FC Cruseilles (8) |
| 92. | AJ Ville-la-Grand (11) | 5–1 | Échenevex-Ségny-Chevry Olympique (10) |
| 93. | CS Megève (12) | 0–6 | US Mont Blanc (8) |
| 94. | AS Italienne Annecy (12) | 1–2 | FC La Filière (11) |
| 95. | CS Ayze (10) | 4–0 | US Argonay (10) |
| 96. | AS Marin (11) | 3–1 | FC Thônes (9) |
| 97. | FC La Coucourde (13) | 4–4 (7–6 p) | AS Vanséenne (11) |
| 98. | Rhône Crussol Foot 07 (9) | 2–0 | JS Livron (12) |
| 99. | AS Roussas-Granges-Gontardes (11) | 2–6 | FC Tricastin (8) |
| 100. | FC Vallon-Pont-d'Arc (12) | 1–5 | FC Cheylarois (11) |
| 101. | AS Vallée du Doux (11) | 2–1 | RC Mauves (10) |
| 102. | FC Montélimar (9) | 2–1 (a.e.t.) | US Portes Hautes Cévennes (8) |
| 103. | FC Serrières-Sablons (10) | 2–3 | AS Donatienne (8) |
| 104. | AS Valensolles (10) | 1–2 | Valence FC (8) |
| 105. | ES Boulieu-lès-Annonay (11) | 2–2 (10–11 p) | FC Châtelet (10) |
| 106. | Entente Sarras Sports St Vallier (9) | 1–2 | FC Chabeuil (8) |
| 107. | AS Cornas (10) | 2–1 | FC Larnage-Serves (11) |
| 108. | FC Clérieux-St Bardoux-Granges-les-Beaumont (13) | 0–4 | Olympique Ruomsois (9) |
| 109. | FC Eyrieux Embroye (9) | 2–1 | FC Péageois (8) |
| 110. | FC Portois (10) | 2–1 | CO Châteauneuvois (10) |
| 111. | AS Berg-Helvie (10) | 1–1 (2–4 p) | JS St Privat (11) |
| 112. | SC Bourguesan (11) | 1–3 | US Montélier (12) |
| 113. | ES Chomérac (11) | 3–1 | US St Just-St Marcel (11) |
| 114. | AJ Chabrillan (13) | 1–4 | US Baixoise (12) |
| 115. | US Peyrins (13) | 0–2 | ES Trèfle (13) |
| 116. | US St Martin-de-Valamas (12) | 2–1 (a.e.t.) | AS Cancoise (12) |
| 117. | US Ancône (11) | 4–1 | FC Rochegudien (12) |
| 118. | FC St Restitut (13) | 0–5 | AS St Barthélemy-Grozon (11) |
| 119. | US Rochemaure (12) | 1–0 (a.e.t.) | US Croix du Fraysse (11) |
| 120. | US Val d'Ay (10) | 1–0 | FR Allan (10) |
| 121. | US Davézieux-Vidalon (10) | 0–1 | US Millery-Vourles (8) |
| 122. | AS Villefontaine (9) | 4–0 | Sud Lyonnais Foot (8) |
| 123. | UC Turque Thonon-les-Bains (11) | 2–8 | FC Foron (9) |
| 124. | FC Léman Presqu'île (12) | 2–6 | CSL Perrignier (12) |
| 125. | SC Morzine Vallée d'Aulps (10) | 2–0 | ASC Sallanches (10) |
| 126. | US Divonne (9) | 1–2 | FJ Ambilly (9) |
| 127. | ES Douvaine-Loisin (12) | 2–1 | FC Chéran (9) |
| 128. | ES Clusienne (11) | 0–1 (a.e.t.) | JS Reignier (9) |
| 129. | FC Cluses (10) | 0–3 | CS La Balme-de-Sillingy (10) |
| 130. | FC Arenthon-Scientrier (12) | 0–3 | ES Viry (11) |
| 131. | CO Chavanod (11) | 2–1 | AS Hautecourt-Romanèche (11) |
| 132. | ES Meythet (11) | 3–4 | US Semnoz-Vieugy (9) |
| 133. | FC Gavot (11) | 0–3 | Football Sud Gessien (10) |
| 134. | AS Montrevelloise (9) | 0–6 | CS Lagnieu (8) |
| 135. | FC Bords de l'Ain (9) | 1–1 (6–7 p) | AS Montréal-la-Cluse (8) |
| 136. | Bourg Sud (11) | 1–1 (4–5 p) | ES Foissiat-Étrez (8) |
| 137. | Olympique Buyatin (12) | 0–10 | US Nantua (8) |
| 138. | AS Guéreins-Genouilleux (12) | 0–4 | FC Bressans (8) |
| 139. | CS Chevroux (12) | 0–2 | ES Val de Saône (10) |
| 140. | US Dombes-Chalamont (11) | 2–4 | ES Revermontoise (10) |
| 141. | Jassans-Frans Foot (9) | 5–1 | FC Côtière-Luenaz (9) |
| 142. | Plaine Revermont Foot (10) | 2–5 | US Arbent Marchon (9) |
| 143. | US St Cyr (12) | 0–4 | AS Bâgé-le-Châtel (10) |
| 144. | FC de la Plaine de l'Ain (11) | 1–6 | Oyonnax Plastics Vallée FC (9) |
| 145. | FC Priay (11) | 2–4 (a.e.t.) | AS Travailleurs Turcs Oyonnax (11) |
| 146. | AS Attignat (11) | 3–0 | ES Cormoranche (11) |
| 147. | CSJ Châtillonnaise (11) | 0–6 | FC St Cyr Collonges au Mont d'Or (10) |
| 148. | FC Bourguisan (10) | 1–0 | US Loire-sur-Rhône (10) |
| 149. | AJ Chapellois (11) | 6–0 | CO La Rivière (12) |
| 150. | FC St Étienne (9) | 5–2 | AS Châteauneuf (8) |
| 151. | FC Montrambert Ricamar (11) | 0–6 | US Villars (8) |
| 152. | AS St Just-St Rambert (9) | 1–5 | AS Savigneux-Montbrison (8) |
| 153. | Haut Pilat Interfoot (11) | 0–2 | Forez Donzy FC (10) |
| 154. | FC Bords de Loire (12) | 1–4 | US St Galmier-Chambœuf (8) |
| 155. | ES Haut Forez (11) | 2–1 | AS Finerbal (12) |
| 156. | US Ecotay-Moingt (11) | 0–2 | L'Étrat-La Tour Sportif (8) |
| 157. | FC Lézigneux (12) | 1–2 | Nord Roannais (11) |
| 158. | FC Chazelles (9) | 2–4 (a.e.t.) | USG La Fouillouse (8) |
| 159. | AS Aveizieux (11) | 2–0 | SEL St Priest-en-Jarez (8) |
| 160. | ACL Mably (11) | 0–5 | US Renaisonnaise Apchonnaise (10) |
| 161. | FC St Joseph-St Martin (11) | 1–2 | US Sud Forézienne (10) |
| 162. | FC Ouches (12) | 0–1 | Riorges FC (10) |
| 163. | US Briennon (10) | 2–1 | FC Commelle-Vernay (9) |
| 164. | AS Grézieu-le-Marché (11) | 3–2 | Olympique Belleroche Villefranche (8) |
| 165. | Entente Plaine Montagne (12) | 0–2 | FCI St Romain-le-Puy (10) |
| 166. | AS Astrée (12) | 0–1 | FC Luriecq (11) |
| 167. | FC Plaine Poncins (12) | 3–1 | ES Dyonisienne (11) |
| 168. | ES Doizieux-La Terrasse-sur-Dorlay (12) | 2–5 (a.e.t.) | ES Champdieu-Marcilly (9) |
| 169. | ES Genas Azieu (10) | 0–2 | FC Chaponnay-Marennes (8) |
| 170. | JS Irigny (10) | 3–0 | AS Bellecour-Perrache (8) |
| 171. | Lyon Ouest SC (9) | 3–5 | US Meyzieu (8) |
| 172. | USF Tarare (10) | 1–4 | FC Pontcharra-St Loup (8) |
| 173. | AS Buers Villeurbanne (10) | 7–0 | Eveil Lyon (11) |
| 174. | FC Sud Ouest 69 (10) | 1–2 (a.e.t.) | CO St Fons (8) |
| 175. | AS Sornins Réunis (11) | 0–1 | Chambost-Allières-St Just-d'Avray (10) |
| 176. | FC Sévenne (10) | 3–4 (a.e.t.) | SO Pont-de-Chéruy-Chavanoz (8) |
| 177. | walkover | – (Note: FC Croix Roussien received a bye due to the two teams in Round 1 tie 317 both being expelled.) | FC Croix Roussien (11) |
| 178. | Entente Odenas-Charentay-St Lager (10) | 0–2 | FC Val Lyonnais (8) |
| 179. | FC Antillais Villeurbanne (12) | 1–4 | Chazay FC (10) |
| 180. | CS Meginand (9) | 3–1 | FC Franchevilloise (11) |
| 181. | AS Toussieu (12) | 2–0 | ACS Mayotte du Rhône (10) |
| 182. | US Reneins Vauxonne (11) | 1–1 (2–3 p) | ES Gliezé (11) |
| 183. | Rhône Sud FC (11) | 1–3 | Olympique Rillieux (10) |
| 184. | FC Deux Fontaines (11) | 1–2 | UO Tassin-la-Demi-Lune (11) |
| 185. | ES Thyez (10) | 0–1 (a.e.t.) | CSA Poisy (10) |
| 186. | AS St Forgeux (10) | 1–4 | AS Montchat Lyon (8) |
| 187. | Pays d'Allevard (12) | 4–1 | FC Sud Isère (10) |
| 188. | Cognin Sports (9) | 3–4 | JS Chambéry (8) |
| 189. | FC Tence (10) | 5–0 | FC Arzon (10) |
| 190. | AS Job (10) | 1–2 | AS Cellule (10) |
| 191. | Jordanne FC (13) | 0–2 | ES Riomois-Condat (9) |

== Third round ==
These matches were played on 15 and 16 September 2018.

Third round results: Auvergne-Rhône-Alpes
| Tie no | Home team (tier) | Score | Away team (tier) |
|---|---|---|---|
| 1. | US Blavozy (6) | 0–2 | FC Chamalières (5) |
| 2. | Parlan-Le Rouget FC (9) | 3–6 (a.e.t.) | FA Le Cendre (7) |
| 3. | Cébazat Sports (7) | 0–0 (4–3 p) | US Beaumontoise (7) |
| 4. | US Courpière (9) | 0–3 | Velay FC (6) |
| 5. | CS Lagnieu (8) | 1–0 (a.e.t.) | FC La Tour-St Clair (7) |
| 6. | FC Échirolles (6) | 5–0 | FC Vallée de la Gresse (7) |
| 7. | FC Aurillac Arpajon Cantal Auvergne (5) | 6–0 | Sporting Chataigneraie Cantal (6) |
| 8. | AS Chadrac (8) | 3–2 | FC Espaly (6) |
| 9. | Sauveteurs Brivois (8) | 1–2 (a.e.t.) | AS Loudes (8) |
| 10. | CS Bessay (9) | 1–0 (a.e.t.) | SC St Pourcain (7) |
| 11. | AA Lapalisse (8) | 3–0 | US Vallon (9) |
| 12. | Bézenet-Doyet Foot (8) | 1–2 | US Feurs (6) |
| 13. | L'Étrat-La Tour Sportif (8) | 2–0 | ES Champdieu-Marcilly (9) |
| 14. | AS Sud Ardèche (7) | 1–0 | Football Côte St André (7) |
| 15. | Olympique Ruomsois (9) | 1–0 (a.e.t.) | Vallée du Guiers FC (8) |
| 16. | Oyonnax Plastics Vallée FC (9) | 0–3 | GFA Rumilly-Vallières (5) |
| 17. | ES Tarentaise (7) | 3–4 (a.e.t.) | JS Chambéry (8) |
| 18. | US Villars (8) | 3–1 | SO Pont-de-Chéruy-Chavanoz (8) |
| 19. | US Murat (9) | 0–8 | Ytrac Foot (5) |
| 20. | ES Riomois-Condat (9) | 0–1 | US St Flour (6) |
| 21. | AS Romagnat (8) | 4–1 | US Orcet (9) |
| 22. | US Issoire (8) | 4–0 | FC Aubierois (9) |
| 23. | RAS Beauregard l'Évêque (9) | 0–3 | FCUS Ambert (7) |
| 24. | Espérance Ceyratois Football (8) | 0–3 | SA Thiers (5) |
| 25. | Montluçon Football (5) | 8–2 | US St Georges / Les Ancizes (6) |
| 26. | AS Aveizieux (11) | 1–2 (a.e.t.) | AS Montchat Lyon (8) |
| 27. | SC Cruas (7) | 1–1 (4–2 p) | Valence FC (8) |
| 28. | Football Sud Gessien (10) | 0–8 | US Annecy-le-Vieux (7) |
| 29. | AS Sansacoise (8) | 0–1 | CS Arpajonnais (7) |
| 30. | AS Haute-Dordogne (10) | 0–0 (5–4 p) | EFC St Amant-Tallende (8) |
| 31. | AS Belbexoise (10) | 0–3 | US Vallée de l'Authre (7) |
| 32. | Pérignat FC (9) | 2–6 | US Brioude (7) |
| 33. | FC Massiac-Molompize-Blesle (8) | 3–3 (5–6 p) | FC Ally Mauriac (7) |
| 34. | ES Margeride (11) | 2–4 | Association Vergongheon-Arvant (7) |
| 35. | ES St Mamet (9) | 0–2 | FC Cournon-d'Auvergne (6) |
| 36. | US Vic-le-Comte (8) | 2–1 | ES St Germinoise (8) |
| 37. | FC Dunières (9) | 3–0 | SC Langogne (7) |
| 38. | AS Cellule (10) | 1–5 | FC Riom (6) |
| 39. | AS St Didier-St Just (8) | 1–3 | US Mozac (9) |
| 40. | AGuiRA FC (10) | 1–2 | US Monistrol (7) |
| 41. | FC Tence (10) | 1–9 | FCO Firminy-Insersport (7) |
| 42. | Olympic St Julien-Chapteuil (8) | 1–2 | AS Emblavez-Vorey (7) |
| 43. | US Sucs et Lignon (8) | 5–0 | Dômes-Sancy Foot (9) |
| 44. | AS Livradois Sud (9) | 0–1 | AS St Jacques (7) |
| 45. | AS Cheminots St Germain (7) | 3–1 | Nord Roannais (11) |
| 46. | Riorges FC (10) | 3–2 | US St Beauzire (7) |
| 47. | AS Gennetinoise (10) | 1–3 | CS Volvic (6) |
| 48. | CS Pont-du-Château (7) | 1–1 (2–4 p) | US Maringues (8) |
| 49. | Bourbon Sportif (9) | 0–1 | AS Louchy (9) |
| 50. | SC Avermes (9) | 2–3 | AS Moulins Foot (5) |
| 51. | US Lignerolles-Lavault Ste Anne (8) | 1–2 | Lempdes Sport (7) |
| 52. | Médiéval Club Montluçonnais (10) | 0–3 | AS Nord Vignoble (8) |
| 53. | AC Creuzier-le-Vieux (8) | 1–3 (a.e.t.) | AS Domerat (6) |
| 54. | AS Le Breuil (10) | 0–2 | AS St Genès-Champanelle (8) |
| 55. | FC Billy-Crechy (9) | 0–2 | RC Vichy (7) |
| 56. | SCA Cussét (7) | 1–4 | Roannais Foot 42 (7) |
| 57. | ES Montrondaise (11) | 0–6 | FC Val Lyonnais (8) |
| 58. | AS Grézieu-le-Marché (11) | 2–2 (2–4 p) | FC Salaise (6) |
| 59. | US Renaisonnaise Apchonnaise (10) | 0–1 | ES Haut Forez (11) |
| 60. | US Briennon (10) | 1–0 | FC Lyon (7) |
| 61. | AJ Chapellois (11) | 0–3 | Caluire SC (8) |
| 62. | US St Galmier-Chambœuf (8) | 2–1 | FC Roche-St Genest (7) |
| 63. | ES Bressane Marboz (7) | 2–4 (a.e.t.) | CS Neuville (8) |
| 64. | FC Bourguisan (10) | 1–3 | Côte Chaude Sportif (6) |
| 65. | FC Luriecq (11) | 1–5 | FC St Étienne (9) |
| 66. | US Sud Forézienne (10) | 3–2 (a.e.t.) | FC Veyle Sâone (7) |
| 67. | JS Irigny (10) | 3–2 | AS Savigneux-Montbrison (8) |
| 68. | Chazay FC (10) | 1–3 | CS Meginand (9) |
| 69. | FC Plaine Poncins (12) | 0–10 | FC Limonest Saint-Didier (5) |
| 70. | Olympique St Genis-Laval (8) | 1–4 | ES Veauche (7) |
| 71. | FC Roanne Clermont (9) | 1–2 | AS Algérienne Chambon-Feugerolles (7) |
| 72. | FCI St Romain-le-Puy (10) | 1–3 | Feyzin Club Belle Étoile (9) |
| 73. | FC St Paul-en-Jarez (9) | 1–5 | AF Pays de Coise (10) |
| 74. | FC Bords de Saône (7) | 2–1 | AS Bron Grand Lyon (7) |
| 75. | Forez Donzy FC (10) | 1–2 | CO St Fons (8) |
| 76. | ES Revermontoise (10) | 2–3 | ES Foissiat-Étrez (8) |
| 77. | UF Belleville St Jean-d'Ardières (7) | 2–3 (a.e.t.) | FC Bressans (8) |
| 78. | US Reventin (11) | 1–3 | US Millery-Vourles (8) |
| 79. | ES Val de Saône (10) | 1–3 | AS Domarin (9) |
| 80. | ES Trèfle (13) | 1–6 | Vénissieux FC (7) |
| 81. | AL St Maurice-l'Exil (9) | 2–1 | Domtac FC (6) |
| 82. | AJA Villeneuve (9) | 1–3 | Chassieu Décines FC (7) |
| 83. | Olympique Rillieux (10) | 2–1 (a.e.t.) | FC Croix Roussien (11) |
| 84. | UO Tassin-la-Demi-Lune (11) | 1–3 | AS Vézeronce-Huert (11) |
| 85. | US Meyzieu (8) | 1–1 (5–4 p) | Ain Sud Foot (5) |
| 86. | SC Portes de l'Ain (9) | 0–5 | Hauts Lyonnais (6) |
| 87. | Chambost-Allières-St Just-d'Avray (10) | 1–1 (3–4 p) | Artas Charantonnay FC (11) |
| 88. | AS Villefontaine (9) | 4–0 | Olympiqe St Quentinois (10) |
| 89. | ES Gliezé (11) | 1–5 | AS Bâgé-le-Châtel (10) |
| 90. | FC Pontcharra-St Loup (8) | 4–0 | FC Varèze (9) |
| 91. | Jassans-Frans Foot (9) | 2–4 | US Feillens (7) |
| 92. | AS Misérieux-Trévoux (7) | 4–1 | USG La Fouillouse (8) |
| 93. | AS Attignat (11) | 1–2 | AS Buers Villeurbanne (10) |
| 94. | US Village Olympique Grenoble (13) | 0–3 | St Chamond Foot (7) |
| 95. | AS Toussieu (12) | 1–3 | FC Chaponnay-Marennes (8) |
| 96. | US Baixoise (12) | 0–13 | UMS Montélimar (6) |
| 97. | US Ro-Claix (11) | 2–4 | US Mours (9) |
| 98. | FC Cheylarois (11) | 2–3 (a.e.t.) | US Val d'Ay (10) |
| 99. | US Ancône (11) | 3–1 | US Jarrie-Champ (8) |
| 100. | FC St Martin d'Uriage (12) | 0–4 | ES Rachais (8) |
| 101. | CS Faramans (12) | 0–1 | Entente Crest-Aouste (8) |
| 102. | US Chartreuse Guiers (9) | 0–3 | FC Bourgoin-Jallieu (5) |
| 103. | FC La Coucourde (13) | 0–12 | MOS Trois Rivières (7) |
| 104. | FC Châtelet (10) | 0–2 | FC Portois (10) |
| 105. | JS St Privat (11) | 3–1 | ES Chomérac (11) |
| 106. | AS Ver Sau (8) | 0–1 | FC Vaulx-en-Velin (5) |
| 107. | AS Donatienne (8) | 2–1 | FC Tricastin (8) |
| 108. | US Rochemaure (12) | 1–3 | FC Charvieu-Chavagneux (7) |
| 109. | US Montélier (12) | 0–7 | FC Rhône Vallées (6) |
| 110. | Olympique St Marcellin (8) | 1–2 | US La Murette (9) |
| 111. | AS Cornas (10) | 1–5 | Olympique de Valence (7) |
| 112. | FC Montélimar (9) | 1–2 | FC Valdaine (7) |
| 113. | FC Chabeuil (8) | 4–0 | AS Chavanay (7) |
| 114. | AS St Barthélemy-Grozon (11) | 1–9 | US Gières (7) |
| 115. | FC La Sure (11) | 4–0 | US St Martin-de-Valamas (12) |
| 116. | CS Châteauneuf-de-Galaure (12) | 0–2 | FC Eyrieux Embroye (9) |
| 117. | FC des Collines (11) | 1–3 | AS Grésivaudan (11) |
| 118. | AS Vallée du Doux (11) | 0–1 | Rhône Crussol Foot 07 (9) |
| 119. | AS Marin (11) | 3–5 | Aix-les-Bains FC (6) |
| 120. | CA Maurienne (8) | 3–2 (a.e.t.) | FC Cruseilles (8) |
| 121. | ES Viry (11) | 2–1 | Concordia FC Bellegarde (9) |
| 122. | CS Ayze (10) | 0–8 | Chambéry SF (5) |
| 123. | ES Seynod (8) | 2–0 | CS Amphion Publier (8) |
| 124. | CS La Balme-de-Sillingy (10) | 3–2 | FC La Filière (11) |
| 125. | FC La Rochette (12) | 0–4 | FC Ballaison (9) |
| 126. | SC Morzine Vallée d'Aulps (10) | 3–0 | US Nantua (8) |
| 127. | ES Douvaine-Loisin (12) | 0–3 | AC Seyssinet (7) |
| 128. | AJ Ville-la-Grand (11) | 0–1 | Entente Val d'Hyères (9) |
| 129. | FJ Ambilly (9) | 4–2 | AS Cuines-La Chambre Val d'Arc (10) |
| 130. | JS Reignier (9) | 3–3 (2–4 p) | Thonon Évian FC (7) |
| 131. | FC Belle Étoile Mercury (9) | 4–0 | CSA Poisy (10) |
| 132. | SS Allinges (10) | 3–4 | AS Montréal-la-Cluse (8) |
| 133. | FC Chambotte (8) | 1–0 (a.e.t.) | ES Drumettaz-Mouxy (9) |
| 134. | US Semnoz-Vieugy (9) | 1–1 (4–3 p) | ES Chilly (8) |
| 135. | Pays d'Allevard (12) | 0–4 | FC Foron (9) |
| 136. | US Mont Blanc (8) | 1–2 (a.e.t.) | Cluses-Scionzier FC (6) |
| 137. | CO Chavanod (11) | 2–3 | US Arbent Marchon (9) |
| 138. | US Les Martres-de-Veyre (8) | 3–2 | AS Moissat (10) |
| 139. | CSL Perrignier (12) | 0–1 | AS Travailleurs Turcs Oyonnax (11) |
| 140. | FC St Cyr Collonges au Mont d'Or (10) | 3–0 | AS Algerienne Villeurbanne (9) |

== Fourth round ==
These matches were played on 29 and 30 September 2018.

Fourth round results: Auvergne-Rhône-Alpes
| Tie no | Home team (tier) | Score | Away team (tier) |
|---|---|---|---|
| 1. | AS Haute-Dordogne (10) | 0–5 | AS Chadrac (8) |
| 2. | FA Le Cendre (7) | 0–1 | FC Aurillac Arpajon Cantal Auvergne (5) |
| 3. | US Mozac (9) | 2–0 | US Les Martres-de-Veyre (8) |
| 4. | AS Loudes (8) | 2–7 (a.e.t.) | US Brioude (7) |
| 5. | AS Romagnat (8) | 0–5 | Le Puy Foot 43 Auvergne (4) |
| 6. | AS St Genès-Champanelle (8) | 3–2 | Velay FC (6) |
| 7. | FC Ally Mauriac (7) | 0–5 | FC Chamalières (5) |
| 8. | US Vallée de l'Authre (7) | 3–0 | US Vic-le-Comte (8) |
| 9. | US Issoire (8) | 2–2 (5–3 p) | Ytrac Foot (5) |
| 10. | Association Vergongheon-Arvant (7) | 0–0 (5–3 p) | FC Cournon-d'Auvergne (6) |
| 11. | Lempdes Sport (7) | 1–0 | CS Arpajonnais (7) |
| 12. | US St Flour (6) | 3–1 (a.e.t.) | AS Emblavez-Vorey (7) |
| 13. | SA Thiers (5) | 2–2 (4–5 p) | Montluçon Football (5) |
| 14. | AS Domerat (6) | 4–1 | US Monistrol (7) |
| 15. | AS St Jacques (7) | 0–3 | FC Riom (6) |
| 16. | AS Nord Vignoble (8) | 3–2 (a.e.t.) | AS Algérienne Chambon-Feugerolles (7) |
| 17. | AA Lapalisse (8) | 0–2 (a.e.t.) | ASF Andrézieux (4) |
| 18. | FC Dunières (9) | 3–1 (a.e.t.) | US Sucs et Lignon (8) |
| 19. | FCUS Ambert (7) | 3–6 (a.e.t.) | AS Cheminots St Germain (7) |
| 20. | Roannais Foot 42 (7) | 2–0 | US St Galmier-Chambœuf (8) |
| 21. | CS Bessay (9) | 1–4 | L'Étrat-La Tour Sportif (8) |
| 22. | AS Louchy (9) | 0–7 | ES Veauche (7) |
| 23. | Cébazat Sports (7) | 1–4 | AS Moulins Foot (5) |
| 24. | US Maringues (8) | 0–2 | US Feurs (6) |
| 25. | FCO Firminy-Insersport (7) | 5–0 | RC Vichy (7) |
| 26. | CS Volvic (6) | 1–0 | AS Yzeure (4) |
| 27. | AF Pays de Coise (10) | 0–2 | FC Eyrieux Embroye (9) |
| 28. | US Val d'Ay (10) | 1–2 | FC Val Lyonnais (8) |
| 29. | Riorges FC (10) | 1–3 | FC Chabeuil (8) |
| 30. | Rhône Crussol Foot 07 (9) | 0–7 | FC Limonest Saint-Didier (5) |
| 31. | US Briennon (10) | 1–9 | FC Vaulx-en-Velin (5) |
| 32. | US Ancône (11) | 0–3 | CS Meginand (9) |
| 33. | FC St Étienne (9) | 0–0 (4–3 p) | Olympique Ruomsois (9) |
| 34. | JS Irigny (10) | 0–2 | FC Valdaine (7) |
| 35. | FC Portois (10) | 0–2 | Côte Chaude Sportif (6) |
| 36. | Olympique de Valence (7) | 1–0 (a.e.t.) | St Chamond Foot (7) |
| 37. | JS St Privat (11) | 2–4 | SC Cruas (7) |
| 38. | CO St Fons (8) | 0–2 | UMS Montélimar (6) |
| 39. | US Feillens (7) | 2–1 | US Villars (8) |
| 40. | AS Sud Ardèche (7) | 3–1 (Note: Result was challenged by Monts d'Or Azergues Foot because the referee didn't send off an AS Sud Ardèche player after awarding a second yellow card. League committee declined the challenge. AS Sud Ardèche qualify.) | Monts d'Or Azergues Foot (4) |
| 41. | ES Haut Forez (11) | 0–1 | FC Rhône Vallées (6) |
| 42. | US Millery-Vourles (8) | 1–0 | US Mours (9) |
| 43. | AS Montchat Lyon (8) | 1–1 (7–8 p) | Entente Crest-Aouste (8) |
| 44. | FC St Cyr Collonges au Mont d'Or (10) | 0–0 (5–4 p) | Caluire SC (8) |
| 45. | Feyzin Club Belle Étoile (9) | 0–0 (3–4 p) | AS Donatienne (8) |
| 46. | Vénissieux FC (7) | 2–0 | FC Pontcharra-St Loup (8) |
| 47. | US La Murette (9) | 5–1 | Olympique Rillieux (10) |
| 48. | FC Chaponnay-Marennes (8) | 3–0 | AS Saint-Priest (4) |
| 49. | Artas Charantonnay FC (11) | 2–3 (a.e.t.) | AS Domarin (9) |
| 50. | AL St Maurice-l'Exil (9) | 1–2 | AS Misérieux-Trévoux (7) |
| 51. | US Meyzieu (8) | 0–0 (4–3 p) | CS Lagnieu (8) |
| 52. | FC Bressans (8) | 3–1 | FC Bourgoin-Jallieu (5) |
| 53. | CS Neuville (8) | 2–3 | Chassieu Décines FC (7) |
| 54. | FC La Sure (11) | 0–2 | ES Foissiat-Étrez (8) |
| 55. | AS Travailleurs Turcs Oyonnax (11) | 1–4 | AS Vézeronce-Huert (11) |
| 56. | AS Bâgé-le-Châtel (10) | 2–3 (a.e.t.) | US Sud Forézienne (10) |
| 57. | AS Villefontaine (9) | 0–2 | Hauts Lyonnais (6) |
| 58. | AS Buers Villeurbanne (10) | 1–3 (a.e.t.) | FC Salaise (6) |
| 59. | US Semnoz-Vieugy (9) | 1–2 | Annecy FC (4) |
| 60. | Chambéry SF (5) | 4–1 | Cluses-Scionzier FC (6) |
| 61. | MOS Trois Rivières (7) | 0–3 | FC Échirolles (6) |
| 62. | US Arbent Marchon (9) | 4–0 | FC Ballaison (9) |
| 63. | FC Foron (9) | 2–1 (a.e.t.) | FC Bords de Saône (7) |
| 64. | ES Rachais (8) | 5–3 | Aix-les-Bains FC (6) |
| 65. | JS Chambéry (8) | 1–3 | ES Seynod (8) |
| 66. | US Annecy-le-Vieux (7) | 4–0 | AS Montréal-la-Cluse (8) |
| 67. | AS Grésivaudan (11) | 3–1 | FC Chambotte (8) |
| 68. | FC Charvieu-Chavagneux (7) | 2–5 | Thonon Évian Savoie FC (7) |
| 69. | ES Viry (11) | 5–6 (a.e.t.) | FJ Ambilly (9) |
| 70. | CA Maurienne (8) | 0–1 | GFA Rumilly-Vallières (5) |
| 71. | SC Morzine Vallée d'Aulps (10) | 0–1 | US Gières (7) |
| 72. | Entente Val d'Hyères (9) | 2–1 | AC Seyssinet (7) |
| 73. | CS La Balme-de-Sillingy (10) | 0–2 | FC Belle Étoile Mercury (9) |

== Fifth round ==
These matches were played on 13 and 14 October 2018.

Fifth round results: Auvergne-Rhône-Alpes
| Tie no | Home team (tier) | Score | Away team (tier) |
|---|---|---|---|
| 1. | US Mozac (9) | 3–1 | FC Dunières (9) |
| 2. | L'Étrat-La Tour Sportif (8) | 2–0 | Lempdes Sport (7) |
| 3. | AS Nord Vignoble (8) | 2–2 (7–6 p) | US Vallée de l'Authre (7) |
| 4. | AS St Genès-Champanelle (8) | 0–5 | US St Flour (6) |
| 5. | ES Veauche (7) | 2–4 | AS Lyon-Duchère (3) |
| 6. | US Sud Forézienne (10) | 0–1 | Montluçon Football (5) |
| 7. | AS Cheminots St Germain (7) | 3–1 | AS Domerat (6) |
| 8. | US Issoire (8) | 0–1 | FC Aurillac Arpajon Cantal Auvergne (5) |
| 9. | US Brioude (7) | 1–2 | Le Puy Foot 43 Auvergne (4) |
| 10. | AS Chadrac (8) | 0–4 | CS Volvic (6) |
| 11. | FC Riom (6) | 2–1 | Association Vergongheon-Arvant (7) |
| 12. | FC St Étienne (9) | 1–4 | FC Chamalières (5) |
| 13. | US Arbent Marchon (9) | 0–3 | ASF Andrézieux (4) |
| 14. | US Meyzieu (8) | 0–1 | Côte Chaude Sportif (6) |
| 15. | FC Salaise (6) | 0–9 | FC Limonest Saint-Didier (5) |
| 16. | Chassieu Décines FC (7) | 2–0 | AS Sud Ardèche (7) |
| 17. | FC Val Lyonnais (8) | 2–1 | Roannais Foot 42 (7) |
| 18. | FCO Firminy-Insersport (7) | 1–1 (6–5 p) | Vénissieux FC (7) |
| 19. | US Millery-Vourles (8) | 0–1 | AS Moulins Foot (5) |
| 20. | US Feurs (6) | 0–0 (2–4 p) | Hauts Lyonnais (6) |
| 21. | AS Vézeronce-Huert (11) | 3–1 | FC St Cyr Collonges au Mont d'Or (10) |
| 22. | CS Meginand (9) | 1–1 (6–5 p) | US La Murette (9) |
| 23. | AS Domarin (9) | 1–1 (4–3 p) | FC Chaponnay-Marennes (8) |
| 24. | ES Foissiat-Étrez (8) | 1–0 | ES Rachais (8) |
| 25. | FC Vaulx-en-Velin (5) | 0–2 | FC Villefranche (3) |
| 26. | AS Donatienne (8) | 0–0 (4–2 p) | ES Seynod (8) |
| 27. | FC Belle Étoile Mercury (9) | 2–1 | FC Rhône Vallées (6) |
| 28. | FJ Ambilly (9) | 2–5 | US Annecy-le-Vieux (7) |
| 29. | FC Bressans (8) | 0–3 | US Feillens (7) |
| 30. | FC Foron (9) | 1–2 | Football Bourg-en-Bresse Péronnas 01 (3) |
| 31. | FC Chabeuil (8) | 1–1 (2–4 p) | FC Échirolles (6) |
| 32. | Entente Crest-Aouste (8) | 2–1 (a.e.t.) | FC Valdaine (7) |
| 33. | SC Cruas (7) | 3–0 | US Gières (7) |
| 34. | UMS Montélimar (6) | 3–2 | Chambéry SF (5) |
| 35. | Olympique de Valence (7) | 3–1 | GFA Rumilly-Vallières (5) |
| 36. | AS Grésivaudan (11) | 2–5 | Entente Val d'Hyères (9) |
| 37. | Thonon Évian Savoie FC (7) | 1–3 | Annecy FC (4) |
| 38. | FC Eyrieux Embroye (9) | 1–2 | AS Misérieux-Trévoux (7) |

== Sixth round ==
These matches were played on 27 and 28 October 2018.

Sixth round results: Auvergne-Rhône-Alpes
| Tie no | Home team (tier) | Score | Away team (tier) |
|---|---|---|---|
| 1. | L'Étrat-La Tour Sportif (8) | 0–4 | Le Puy Foot 43 Auvergne (4) |
| 2. | US Mozac (9) | 2–3 (a.e.t.) | FC Riom (6) |
| 3. | FC Chamalières (5) | 4–0 | US St Flour (6) |
| 4. | AS Domarin (9) | 0–6 | AS Lyon-Duchère (3) |
| 5. | CS Meginand (9) | 0–4 | FC Aurillac Arpajon Cantal Auvergne (5) |
| 6. | CS Volvic (6) | 4–1 | FCO Firminy-Insersport (7) |
| 7. | AS Misérieux-Trévoux (7) | 0–1 | Chassieu Décines FC (7) |
| 8. | AS Nord Vignoble (8) | 1–2 | Montluçon Football (5) |
| 9. | AS Cheminots St Germain (7) | 0–3 | ASF Andrézieux (4) |
| 10. | ES Foissiat-Étrez (8) | 1–7 | UMS Montélimar (6) |
| 11. | SC Cruas (7) | 0–2 | FC Limonest Saint-Didier (5) |
| 12. | AS Donatienne (8) | 1–2 | Annecy FC (4) |
| 13. | FC Belle Étoile Mercury (9) | 0–4 | Olympique de Valence (7) |
| 14. | FC Val Lyonnais (8) | 2–0 | Côte Chaude Sportif (6) |
| 15. | AS Vézeronce-Huert (11) | 0–2 | Entente Crest-Aouste (8) |
| 16. | FC Échirolles (6) | 2–5 | FC Villefranche (3) |
| 17. | Entente Val d'Hyères (9) | 1–2 | US Feillens (7) |
| 18. | US Annecy-le-Vieux (7) | 3–2 (a.e.t.) | AS Moulins Foot (5) |
| 19. | Hauts Lyonnais (6) | 2–4 (a.e.t.) | Football Bourg-en-Bresse Péronnas 01 (3) |
