= Régional 1 =

Football league in France

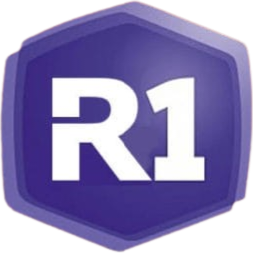
- Founded: 1919; 107 years ago
- Country: France
- Confederation: UEFA
- Level on pyramid: 3 (1933–1948); 4 (1948–1978); 5 (1978–1993); 6 (1993–present)
- Promotion to: National 2
- Relegation to: Régional 2
- Domestic cup: Coupe de France
- Website: www.fff.fr

The Régional 1, formerly known as the Division d'Honneur, is the generic name for the sixth-tier football league competitions run by each of the 13 regional leagues in France. Clubs may be promoted from these leagues into the Championnat National 3, subject to certain criteria. The name is also used for the highest level of football in the French overseas departments and regions of Guadeloupe, French Guiana, Martinique, Mayotte and Réunion.

Each region administers its own league under its own rules and may give it a distinct name. Some clubs are semi-professional, and qualifying reserve and academy teams of clubs competing at higher levels are also eligible to enter.

== Clubs ==
As of the 2020–21 season

=== Ligue d'Auvergne-Rhône-Alpes ===
==== Group A ====
- Blavozy
- Clermont Foot III
- Clermont Saint-Jacques
- AS Domerat
- FC Espaly
- AS Moulins
- Moulins Yzeure Foot II
- FC Riom
- US Saint-Georges
- FC Velay
- RC Vichy
- CS Volvic
- Ytrac Foot

==== Group B ====
- FC Aix-les-Bains
- FC Bourg-en-Bresse II
- Chassieu Décines
- Cluses-Scionzier
- FC Échirolles
- US Feurs
- Grenoble Foot II
- FC Limonest Saint-Didier II
- Monts d'Or Azergues Foot II
- UMS Montélimar
- Olympique de Valence
- FC Rhône Vallées
- Salaise/Sanne
- Thonon Évian

=== Ligue Bourgogne-Franche-Comté ===
==== Group A ====
- AJ Auxerre III
- Auxerre Stade
- Avallon FCO
- FC Chalon
- US Charitoise
- US Cosne
- Fauverney Rouvres
- IS-Selongey
- UF Mâcon
- USC Paray
- FC Paron
- AS Quetigny
- AS Saint-Apollinaire
- Sud Nivernais Imphy Decize

==== Group B ====
- AS Baume-les-Dames
- AS Belfort Sud
- Racing Besançon II
- Bresse Jura Foot
- FC Champagnole
- FC Grandvillars II
- Jura Sud Foot II
- RC Lons le Saunier
- Louhans-Cuiseaux FC II
- CA Pontarlier II
- US Saint-Vit
- FC Vesoul
- 4 Rivières 70

=== Ligue de Bretagne ===
==== Group A ====
- Chateaulin FC
- US Concarneau II
- SM Douarnenez
- GDS Guipavas
- US La Montagne
- CEP Lorient
- Loudeac OSC
- SP Milizac
- Stade Plabennécois II
- Kériolets de Pluvigner
- GSI Pontivy II
- EA Saint-Renan
- Séné FC
- Vannes OC II

==== Group B ====
- FC Atlantique Villaine
- FC Breteil Talensac
- OC Cesson
- Dinan-Léhon FC II
- FC Guipry-Messac
- Lamballe FC
- US Langueux
- SC Le Rheu
- Plancoet Aguenon FC
- US Quessoy
- US Saint-Malo II
- AS Vignoc Hédé Guipel
- AS Vitré II

=== Ligue Centre-Val-de-Loire ===
- J3S Amilly
- SC Azay Chenillé
- Blois Football 41 II
- AS Portugais de Bourges
- C'Chartres Football III
- Chambray FC
- FC Deols
- AS Saint-Amand-Montrond
- FC Saint-Georges-sur-Eure
- FC Saint-Jean-le-Blanc
- Tours FC II
- SF Vileuil

=== Ligue de Corse ===
- AFA FA
- GFC Ajaccio II
- FC Bastelicaccia
- ÉF Bastia
- AJ Biguglia
- US Bocognano Gravona
- AS Casinca
- USC Corte
- AS Furiani Aglia II
- Gallia Club Lunel
- US Ghisonaccia
- AS Nebbiu Conca d'Oru
- AS Porto-Vecchio
- FC Sainte-Lucie

=== Ligue Grand-Est ===
==== Group A ====
- AS Asfeld
- AS Avize Grauves
- FC Bogny
- RCDS La Chapelle
- FC Cormontreuil
- US Eclaron
- RC Épernay Champagne
- FC Métropole Troyenne II
- FC Nogentais
- EF Reims Sainte-Anne
- Rethel Sporting Football
- FC Saint-Mesmin
- CS Sedan Ardennes II
- SA Sézannais

==== Group B ====
- Bar-le-Duc FC
- CA Boulay
- RC Champigneulles
- US Forbach
- Jarville JF
- Lunéville FC
- APM Metz
- AS Nancy-Lorraine II
- AS Pagny-sur-Moselle
- Saint-Avold
- FC Thionville
- US Vandoeuvre
- US Vaux-sur-Blaise
- ES Villerupt Thil

==== Group C ====
- Bischheim Soleil FC
- SR Colmar
- AS Erstein
- FC Geispolsheim
- ES Golbey
- FC Hagenthal Wentzwiller
- FCSR Haguenau II
- FC Hegenheim
- ASIM Illzach
- FC Obermodern
- US Reipertswiller
- FC Sarrebourg
- FCE Schirrhein
- FC Strasbourg Kronenbourg

=== Ligue Hauts-de-France ===
==== Group A ====
- OS Aise
- CS Avion
- Stade béthunois
- US Camon
- USL Dunkerque II
- US Gravelines
- ESC Longueau
- FC Loon-Plage
- AS Marck
- US Noeux
- ASF Outreau
- US Saint-Omer
- US Tourcoing FC
- Wasquehal Football

==== Group B ====
- AC Chambray
- US Chantilly
- US Chauny
- AFC Compiegne
- US Guignicourt
- SC Hazebrouck
- FC Itancourt Neuville
- US Laon
- US Lesquin
- USSM Loos
- US Nogent
- US Roye-Noyon
- FC Saint-Amand-les-Eaux
- USM Senlis

=== Ligue de Méditérranée ===
- SPC Berre
- AS Cagnes-le-Cros
- ES Cannet-Rocheville
- FC Carnoux
- US Carqueiranne
- SPC Courthezon
- ES Fos-sur-Mer
- Marignane Gignac FC II
- Stade marseillais
- ROS Rapid_de_Menton
- FC Rousset SVO
- AS Sainte-Maxime
- Salon Bel Air Football
- SC Toulon II

=== Ligue de Normandie ===
==== Group A ====
- FC Argentan
- Bayeux
- ASPTT Caen
- SU Dives-Cabourg
- JS Douvres
- US Ducey-Isigny
- Football Club Flérien
- US Granville II
- OS Maladerie
- USON Mondeville
- US Saint-Lô-Manche
- AS Tourlaville

==== Group B ====
- FUSC Bois-Guillaume
- AST Deauville
- AL Deville-Maromme
- CSSM Le Havre
- AS Madrillet-Château-Blanc
- US Mesnil-Esnard Franqueville
- CMS Oissel II
- O Pavillon
- Romilly Pont-Saint-Pierre
- FC Rouen II
- Stade Sotteville
- AC Yvetot

=== Ligue Nouvelle-Aquitaine ===
Group A

- Stade Bordelais
- FC Bressuire
- Limoges Football
- Angoulême Charente FC 2
- FC Périgny
- ES Buxerolles
- FC Chauray 2
- CS Feytiat
- Thouars Foot 79
- ESA Brive
- FC Saint-André-de-Cubzac
- SO Châtellerault
- FC Nueillaubiers
- RC Parthenay Viennay

Group B

- SA Mérignac
- Saint-Paul-Sport
- FC Girondins de Bordeaux
- FC Saint-Médard-en-Jalles
- Stade Montois
- Les Croisés de Saint-André de Bayonne
- AS Mazères-Uzos-Rontignon
- E. Boé Bon-Encontre
- US Bouscat
- Sud Corrèze FC
- Jeunesse Villenavaise
- FC Marmande 47
- ES Boulazac
- Aviron Bayonnais FC 2

== Overseas leagues ==
The Guadeloupean League, French Guiana League, and the Martinican League are associated to CONCACAF.

The Reunionese League is associated to CAF and Mayotte League is a non-affiliated league.
