= Fabien Mira =

French former professional footballer (born 1961)

Personal information
- Full name: Fabien Mira
- Date of birth: 25 November 1961 (age 64)
- Place of birth: Montpellier, France
- Height: 1.78 m (5 ft 10 in)
- Position: Defender

Team information
- Current team: US Montélimar (manager)

Senior career*
Years	Team	Apps	(Gls)
1980–1981	Vichy	24	(0)
1981–1983	Fontainebleau	43	(1)
1983–1986	Bourg-sous-La Roche	83	(9)
1986–1988	FC Valence	58	(2)
1988–1992	USJOA Valence	106	(11)
1992–1993	ASOA Valence	10	(0)

Managerial career
- 1999–2004: US Montélimar
- 2004–2006: FC Rhône-Vallées
- 2006–2013: AS Valence
- 2013–2015: US Montélimar
- 2015–2016: US Vallée du Jabron
- 2017–2022: Olympique Ruomsois
- 2022–2025: US Montélimar
- * Club domestic league appearances and goals

Fabien Mira (born 25 November 1961) is a French former professional footballer and manager who played as a defender.

== Playing career ==
Born in Montpellier, Mira started his professional career in the 1980–81 season with Division 3 club Vichy. After making 24 appearances during his debut campaign, he was signed by Division 2 side Fontainebleau in the summer of 1981. Mira played 43 league matches during a two-year spell at Fontainebleau, scoring once. In 1983, he joined Bourg-sous-La Roche and scored six goals in 29 appearances during his first season as the team won promotion to Division 2. He then played 32 matches in the 1984–85 campaign as La Roche were relegated back to Division 3. Mira spent one more season with the club before transferring to FC Valence in 1986.

Mira played for FC Valence for two seasons, scoring once in 29 appearances during each campaign. He joined local rivals USJOA Valence in 1988 and went on to spend five years with the club. In the 1991–92 season, he was part of the team that won promotion to Division 2. In 1992, FC Valence and USJOA Valence merged to form ASOA Valence. Mira spent one season with the new club before retiring from playing in 1993, having made a total of 324 league appearances and scored 23 goals.

== Managerial career ==
In the summer of 2010, Mira was appointed manager of AS Valence and in his first season in charge, he led the team to promotion to the Championnat de France amateur.

He decided to step down as manager of Montélimar at the end of the 2014–15 season.

He was appointed as manager of Olympique Ruomsois in 2017.

He was reappointed as manager of UMS Montélimar in summer 2022. In March 2025, he announced he would leave Montélimar at the end of the season.
