= Parizeau =

Parizeau (French pronunciation: [pa.riˈzo]) is a surname of French origin.

Notable people with this surname include:

- Alice Parizeau, Polish-Canadian writer
- André Parizeau, Canadian politician from the Communist Party of Quebec
- Francine Boulay-Parizeau, Canadian handball player
- Jacques Parizeau, Canadian politician
- Michel Parizeau, Canadian ice hockey player
- Damase Parizeau, Canadian politician
- Roger Parizeau, Canadian politician

== See also ==
- Pariseau (disambiguation)
