= Pariseau =

Pariseau may refer to:

- Mother Joseph Pariseau (1823–1902), Canadian Religious Sister
- Pat Pariseau (1936-2020), American politician from Minnesota
- Île Pariseau, an island in Canada
- Léo-Pariseau Prize

== See also ==
- Parizeau, a surname
