= Impact of the Hindu–German Conspiracy =

The Hindu–German Conspiracy failed to engage popular support within India. However, it had a significant impact on Britain's policies within the empire and international relations. The outlines and plans for the nascent ideas of the conspiracy were noted, and tracking by British intelligence began as early as 1911. Alarmed at the agile organization, which repeatedly reformed in different parts of the country despite being subdued in others, the chief of Indian Intelligence Sir Charles Cleveland was forced to warn that the idea and attempts at pan-Indian revolutions were spreading through India "like some hidden fire." A massive, concerted and coordinated effort was required to subdue the movement. Attempts were made in 1914 to prevent the naturalisation of Tarak Nath Das as an American citizen, while successful pressure was applied to have Har Dayal interned. The conspiracy had been detected early by British intelligence, and had been the subject of British pressure from 1914.

== Background ==
World War I began with an unprecedented outpouring of loyalty and goodwill towards the United Kingdom from within the mainstream political leadership, contrary to initial British fears of an Indian revolt. India contributed massively to the British war effort by providing men and resources. About 1.3 million Indian soldiers and laborers served in Europe, Africa, and the Middle East, while both the Indian government and the princes sent large supplies of food, money, and ammunition. However, Bengal and Punjab remained hotbeds of anti-colonial activities. Terrorism in Bengal, increasingly closely linked with the unrests in Punjab, was significant enough to nearly paralyze the regional administration. Also from the beginning of the war, expatriate Indian population, notably from United States, Canada, and Germany, headed by the Berlin Committee and the Ghadar Party, attempted to trigger insurrections in India on the lines of the 1857 uprising with Irish Republican, German and Turkish help in a massive conspiracy that has since come to be called the Hindu–German Conspiracy This conspiracy also attempted to rally Afghanistan against British India. A number of failed attempts were made at mutiny, of which the February mutiny plan and the 1915 Singapore Mutiny remains most notable. This movement was suppressed by means of a massive international counter-intelligence operation and political acts (including the Defence of India Act 1915) that lasted nearly ten years.

== Political impact ==
The Conspiracy, judged by the British Indian Government's own evaluation at the time, and those of a number of contemporary and modern historians, was one of the most important events in the Indian independence movement and was one of the most significant threats to have faced the Raj in the second decade of the 20th century.

=== In India ===
The conspiracy, especially in the scenario of the British war effort and the threat from the militant movement in India, was the major factor for the passage of the Defence of India Act 1915. Among the strongest proponents of the act was Michael O'Dwyer, the then Lieutenant Governor of Punjab, and this was largely due to the Ghadar movement.

It is now judged to have been the principal factor guiding British political concessions as well as Whitehall's India policy during and after World War I, including the passage of Montagu–Chelmsford Reforms. It has also been suggested by a number of historians that the events, especially in Punjab, in 1919 owed to a large extent to the Ghadar movement or what was left of it, the presence of Pratap's Kabul mission in Afghanistan its overtures towards Bolshevik Russia, and the Raj's perception of its potential was a key factor, in spurring political progression in India. In 1917, the Montagu–Chelmsford Reforms initiated the first rounds of political reform in the Indian subcontinent. At the same time, a Sedition Committee chaired by Sydney Rowlatt, an English judge, was instituted in 1918 which evaluated the Indo-German-Ghadar link and the militant movement in India. On the recommendations of the committee, the Rowlatt Act, an extension of the Defence of India Act 1915, was enforced in response to the threat in Punjab and Bengal.

1919 was also the time that Indian troops were returning from the battlefields of Europe and Mesopotamia to find India far removed from the ideals they fought for and in the midst of economic and political stagnation. The attempts of mutiny in 1915 and the Lahore conspiracy trials were still in public attention. News of young Mohajirs who fought on behalf of the Turkish Caliphate and later fought in the ranks of the Red Army during the Russian Civil War also began reaching India at this time. The Russian Revolution had also cast its long shadow on India. It was also at this time that Gandhi, till then relatively unknown in the Indian political scene, began emerging as a mass leader.

=== Afghanistan ===
Ominously, in 1919, the Third Anglo-Afghan War began in the wake of Amir Habibullah's assassination and institution of Amānullāh in a system blatantly influenced by the Kabul Mission. In addition, in India, Gandhi's call for protest against the Rowlatt Act achieved an unprecedented response of furious unrest and protests. The situation especially in Punjab was deteriorating rapidly, with disruptions of rail, telegraph, and communication systems. The movement was at its peak before the end of the first week of April, with some recording that "practically the whole of Lahore was on the streets, the immense crowd that passed through Anarkali was estimated to be around 20,000." In Amritsar, over 5,000 people gathered at Jallianwala Bagh. This situation deteriorated perceptibly over the next few days. Michael O'Dwyer is said to have been of firm belief that these were the early and ill-concealed signs of a conspiracy of a coordinated uprising around May, on the lines of the 1857 revolt, at a time when the British troops would have withdrawn to the hills for the summer. The Amritsar massacre, as well as responses preceding and succeeding it, contrary to being an isolated incident, was the result of a concerted plan of response from the Punjab administration to suppress such a conspiracy succeeding. James Houssemayne Du Boulay is said to have ascribed a direct relationship between the fear of a Ghadarite uprising in the midst of an increasingly tense situation in Punjab, and the British response that ended in the massacre.

Lastly, the British efforts to downplay and disguise the nature and impact of the revolutionary movement at this time also resulted in a policy designed to strengthen the moderate movement in India, which ultimately saw Gandhi's rise in the Indian movement.

== International relations ==
The conspiracy influenced a number of aspects of Great Britain's international relations, most of all the Anglo-American relations during the war, as well as, to some extent, the Anglo-Chinese relations. After the war, it was one of the issues that influenced Anglo-Japanese relations.

=== Anglo-US relations ===
By 1916, the majority of the resources of the American Department of the British Foreign Office were related to the Indian seditionist movement. Before the outbreak of the war, Cecil Spring Rice, the Ambassador to the United States at the time of the war, is known to resist the British Foreign Office from making this a diplomatic issue. Spring-Rice's dispatches cite concerns with regards to American tolerance of the Anarchist movements in American soil, the American government's inactions despite concrete knowledge (in Spring-Rice's opinion) of the conspiracies, as well as concerns regarding the image of Britain in American public opinion if she is seen to persecute oppressed people. Further, Spring-Rice was particularly wary of the Wilson administration's political commitments, especially given that the United States Secretary of State William Jennings Bryan had authored eight years previously a pamphlet highly critical of the "British rule in India", which had been classified as seditionist by the Indian and Imperial governments. Following Bryan's departure, the Secretary of State for India, the Marquess of Crewe, attempted to persuade Spring-Rice to raise the issue in front of the United States government. American authorities in the Philippines were also more cooperative at this time which assured Britain of knowledge of any plans against Hong Kong. Following the conclusion of the Lahore Conspiracy Case trial, and as more evidence of German complicity came afore, Foreign Secretary Edward Grey was forced to override Spring-Rice's concerns. In February 1916, the concerns of the British government regarding the conspiracy and German complicity were officially presented to the American government.

However, although the new Secretary of State, Robert Lansing, was initially as uncooperative as Bryan, the first investigations of the conspiracy opened with the raid of the Wall Street office of Wolf von Igel, seizing papers that were later presented as evidence in the Hindu–German Conspiracy Trial. To much chagrin of the British government, however, it was not pursued further at the time. The issue precipitated a more general Anglo-American neutrality dispute, aggravated by belligerent preventive measures taken by the British Far-Eastern fleet on the high seas that threatened the sovereignty of American vessels. The seizure of German and Turkish passengers from the American vessel China by HMS Laurentic at the mouth of the Yangtze River and the following argument by the British government that the seizure planned to foment armed uprising in India provoked outrage from the American government, followed by a number of incidents, including the SS Henry S incident. The U. S. Atlantic Fleet dispatched destroyers to the Philippines. The relations were strained when in May 1916, the British government decided to relax its aggressive policy and seek cooperation with the US. The China prisoners were released that month, but relations did not improve before November that year, with a number of exchanges through the rest of 1916.

The issue was ultimately addressed by William G. E. Wiseman, head of British intelligence in the US, who passed on details of a bomb plot directly to the New York Police bypassing diplomatic channels. This led to the arrest of Chandra Kanta Chuckrevarty. As the links between Chuckervarty papers and the Igel papers became apparent, the investigations by Federal authorities ultimately expanded to cover the entire conspiracy., with the US agreeing to pass on evidence so long as Britain did not seek admission of liability for Breaches of Neutrality. At a time when diplomatic relations with Germany were deteriorating, the Foreign Office directed the Embassy to cooperate with the investigations. These ultimately resolved the Anglo-American diplomatic disputes just as America entered the war.

=== Sino-English and Anglo-Japanese relations ===
Through 1915–16, China (along with Indonesia) formed one of the major bases for the conspirators, and significant efforts were made by the British Government to coax China into the war to attempt to control the German and Ghadar intrigues. This would also allow the free purchase of arms from China for the Entente powers. However, Yuan's proposals for bringing China into the war were against Japanese interests and gains from the war. This along with Japanese support for Sun Yat Sen and rebels in Southern China laid the foundations of deterioration of Anglo-Japanese relations as early as 1916. After the end of World War I, Japan increasingly became a haven for radical Indian nationalists in exile, who were protected by patriotic Japanese societies. Notable among these included Rash Behari Bose, Tarak Nath Das, A. M. Sahay as well as others. The protections offered to these nationalists effectively prevented British efforts to repatriate them and became a major policy concern.

== Indian Independence Committee ==
The IIC was formally disbanded in November 1918, with most of its members becoming closely associated with Communism and the Soviet Union. Bhupendranath Datta and V. N. Chatterjee arrived in Moscow in 1920. Narendranath Bhattacharya, under a new identity of M. N. Roy was amongst the first Indian communists and made a memorable speech in the second congress of the Communist International that rejected the Leninist thesis and foreshadowed Maoist peasant movements. Chatterjee himself was in Berlin till 1932 as the general secretary of the League Against Imperialism and was able to convince Nehru to affiliate Indian National Congress with the league in 1927.He later fled Nazi Germany for Soviet Russia but disappeared in 1937 under Stalin's Great Purge.

== Ghadar Party ==
The Ghadar Party, suppressed during the war, revived itself in 1920 and openly declared its communist beliefs. Although sidelined in California, it remained relatively stronger in East Asia, where it allied itself with the Chinese Communist Party.

== Later efforts ==
Although the conspiracy failed during World War I and the movement was suppressed at the time with a number of its key leaders hanged or incarcerated, a number of prominent Ghadarites also managed to flee India to Japan and Thailand. The concept of a revolutionary movement for independence also found a revival amongst later-generation Indian leaders, most notably Subhas Chandra Bose, who towards the mid-1930s began calling for a more radical approach towards colonial domination. During World War II, a number of these leaders were instrumental in seeking Axis support to revive such a concept. Bose himself, from the very beginning of World War II actively evaluated the concept of revolutionary movement against the Raj, interacting with Japan and subsequently escaping to Germany to raise an Indian armed force, the Indische Legion, to fight in India against Britain. He would later return to South East Asia to take charge of the Indian National Army which was formed following the labour of exiled nationalists, efforts from within Japan to revive a similar concept, and the direction and leadership of people like Mohan Singh, Giani Pritam Singh, Rash Behari Bose. The most famous of these saw the formation of the Indian Independence League, the Indian National Army and ultimately the Arzi Hukumat-e-Azad Hind in South East Asia.

== Notes and references ==
=== Sources ===
- Brown, Giles T. (1 August 1948). "The Hindu Conspiracy, 1914-1917". Pacific Historical Review. 17 (3): 299–310. doi:10.2307/3634258. JSTOR 3634258.
- Brown, Emily C. (May 1973). "Indian Revolutionaries Abroad, 1905–1922: In the Background of International Developments. By Arun Coomer Bose. Patna: Bharati Bhawan, 1971. xv, 268 pp. Illustrations, Bibliography, Index. (Dist. By South Asian Books, Columbia, Mo.)". The Journal of Asian Studies. 32 (3): 522–523. doi:10.2307/2052702. JSTOR 2052702. S2CID 153543772.
- Brown, Emily C. (February 1986). "The Indian Revolutionary Problem in British Diplomacy, 1914–1919. By Don Dignan. New Delhi: Allied Publishers, 1983. xvi, 256 pp. Notes, Bibliography, Index. (Distributed by South Asia Books, Columbia, Mo.)". The Journal of Asian Studies. 45 (2): 421–422. doi:10.2307/2055882. JSTOR 2055882.
- Cell, John W. (22 August 2002). Hailey: A Study in British Imperialism, 1872-1969. Cambridge University Press. ISBN 978-0-521-52117-8.
- Cole, Howard; et al. (2001). Labour and Radical Politics 1762–1937. Routledge. ISBN 0-415-26576-2.
- Deepak, B. R. (1999). "Revolutionary Activities of the Ghadar Party in China". China Report. 35 (4). Sage Publications: 439. doi:10.1177/000944559903500402. ISSN 0009-4455. S2CID 154972977.
- Dignan, Don (February 1971). "The Hindu Conspiracy in Anglo-American Relations during World War I". The Pacific Historical Review. 40 (1). University of California Press: 57–76. doi:10.2307/3637829. ISSN 0030-8684. JSTOR 3637829.
- Dignan, Don (1983). The Indian Revolutionary Problem in British Diplomacy, 1914-1919. Allied Publishers.
- Fay, Peter W. (1993). The Forgotten Army: India's Armed Struggle for Independence, 1942–1945. Ann Arbor: University of Michigan Press. ISBN 0-472-08342-2.
- Fraser, Thomas G. (April 1977). "Germany and Indian Revolution, 1914-18". Journal of Contemporary History. 12 (2): 255–272. doi:10.1177/002200947701200203. S2CID 161813088.
- Gupta, Amit Kumar (September 1997). "Defying Death: Nationalist Revolutionism in India, 1897-1938". Social Scientist. 25 (9/10): 3–27. doi:10.2307/3517678. JSTOR 3517678.
- Hoover, Karl (May 1985). "The Hindu Conspiracy in California, 1913-1918". German Studies Review. 8 (2): 245–261. doi:10.2307/1428642. JSTOR 1428642.
- Hopkirk, Peter (1997). Like Hidden Fire: The Plot to Bring Down the British Empire. Kodansha Globe. ISBN 1-56836-127-0.
- Hopkirk, Peter (2001). On Secret Service East of Constantinople. Oxford Paperbacks. ISBN 0-19-280230-5.
- Ker, J. C. (1917). Political Trouble in India 1907–1917. Calcutta.: Superintendent Government Printing, India, 1917. Republished 1973 by Delhi, Oriental Publishers. OCLC 1208166.
- Lebra, Joyce C. (1977). Japanese trained armies in South-East Asia. New York: Columbia University Press. ISBN 0-231-03995-6.
- Lovett, Sir Verney (1920). A History of the Indian Nationalist Movement. New York: Frederick A. Stokes Company. ISBN 81-7536-249-9.
- Majumdar, Ramesh C. (1971). History of the Freedom Movement in India. Vol. II. Firma K. L. Mukhopadhyay. ISBN 81-7102-099-2.
- Popplewell, Richard James (1995). Intelligence and Imperial Defence: British Intelligence and the Defence of the Indian Empire, 1904-1924. Psychology Press. ISBN 978-0-7146-4580-3.
- Sarkar, Benoy Kumar (March 1921). "Reviewed work: A History of the Indian Nationalist Movement., Verney Lovett". Political Science Quarterly. 36 (1): 136. doi:10.2307/2142669. JSTOR 2142669.
- Sarkar, Sumit (1983). Modern India, 1885-1947. Delhi: Macmillan. ISBN 978-0-333-90425-1.
- Sinha, P. B. (November 1971). "A New Source for the History of the Revolutionary Movement in India, 1907–1917". The Journal of Asian Studies. 31 (1): 151–156. doi:10.2307/2053060. JSTOR 2053060. S2CID 156523255.
- Strachan, Hew (2001). The First World War. Vol. I: To Arms. Oxford University Press USA. ISBN 0-19-926191-1.
- Tinker, Hugh (October 1968). "India in the First World War and after". Journal of Contemporary History. 3 (4): 89–107. doi:10.1177/002200946800300407. S2CID 150456443.
