= César-Egasse du Boulay =

French historian

César-Egasse du Boulay (died 1678), known as Bulaeus, was a French historian.

== Life ==
He was born at the beginning of the seventeenth century at Saint-Ellier, Maine (province). After teaching humanities in the College of Navarre he occupied important positions in the University of Paris, including those of rector and historian of the university. He died on 16 October 1678.

== Works ==
His main work is the Historia Universitatis Parisiensis, covering the period from the supposed foundation of the university by Charlemagne (800) to 1600. The first three volumes published in 1665 were censured by the university. To justify himself, the author wrote the Notæ ad censuram ... (Paris, 1667). The censors appointed by the king found nothing blameworthy in the work, and the last three volumes were published in 1673.

The 1913 Catholic Encyclopedia describes Boulay's history as "important on account of the many original documents which it reproduces", but criticizes the "poor judgment of the author." Philosopher Hastings Rashdall called Boulay "perhaps the stupidest man who ever wrote a valuable book".

Other writings of Du Boulay refer to the same topic of the university, its foundation, patrons, administration, and privileges:

- De patronis quatuor nationum universitatis (1662)
- Carlomagnolia ... (1662)
- De decanatu nationis Gallicanæ ... (1662)
- Remarques sur la dignité, rang ... du recteur (1668)
- Remarques sur l'election des officiers de l'Université (1668)
- Recueil des privilèges de l'Université ... (1674)
- Fondation de l'Université par l'empereur Charlemagne ... (1675).

In addition to these Du Boulay wrote Speculum eloquentiæ (1658) and Trésor des antiquités romaines (1650).
