= Olympique de Valence =

French football club

- Full name: Olympique de Valence
- Founded: 2005 (as AS Valence); 2014 (refounded)
- Ground: Stade Georges Pompidou; Valence
- Capacity: 12,500
- President: Jean Marie Vergnes
- Manager: Philippe Brunel
- League: National 3 Group K
- 2022–23: Régional 1 Auvergne-Rhône-Alpes, Group B, 1st (promoted))
- Website: https://www.olympique-valence.fr
Home colours

Olympique de Valence (formerly Association Sportive Valence), simply known as Valence, is a French association football club based in the town of Valence, Drôme. It was founded in 2005 following the demise of ASOA Valence and folded in 2014 but was refounded immediately. As of the 2023–24 season, the club's senior team plays in Championnat National 3, the fifth tier of French football.

== History ==
Former logo of AS Valence.

AS Valence was founded in 2005 after the town's previous club, ASOA Valence, which had been playing in the Championnat National, was disbanded in August of that year. The senior team, coached by Eric Vila, joined the DH Rhône-Alpes, a regional league at the sixth tier of the French football league system, and finished in fourth place in the 2005–06 season. In the summer of 2006, former ASOA Valence player Fabien Mira was hired as manager. At the end of the following campaign, however, Valence finished tenth in the division and the team was subsequently relegated to the DHR Rhône-Alpes.

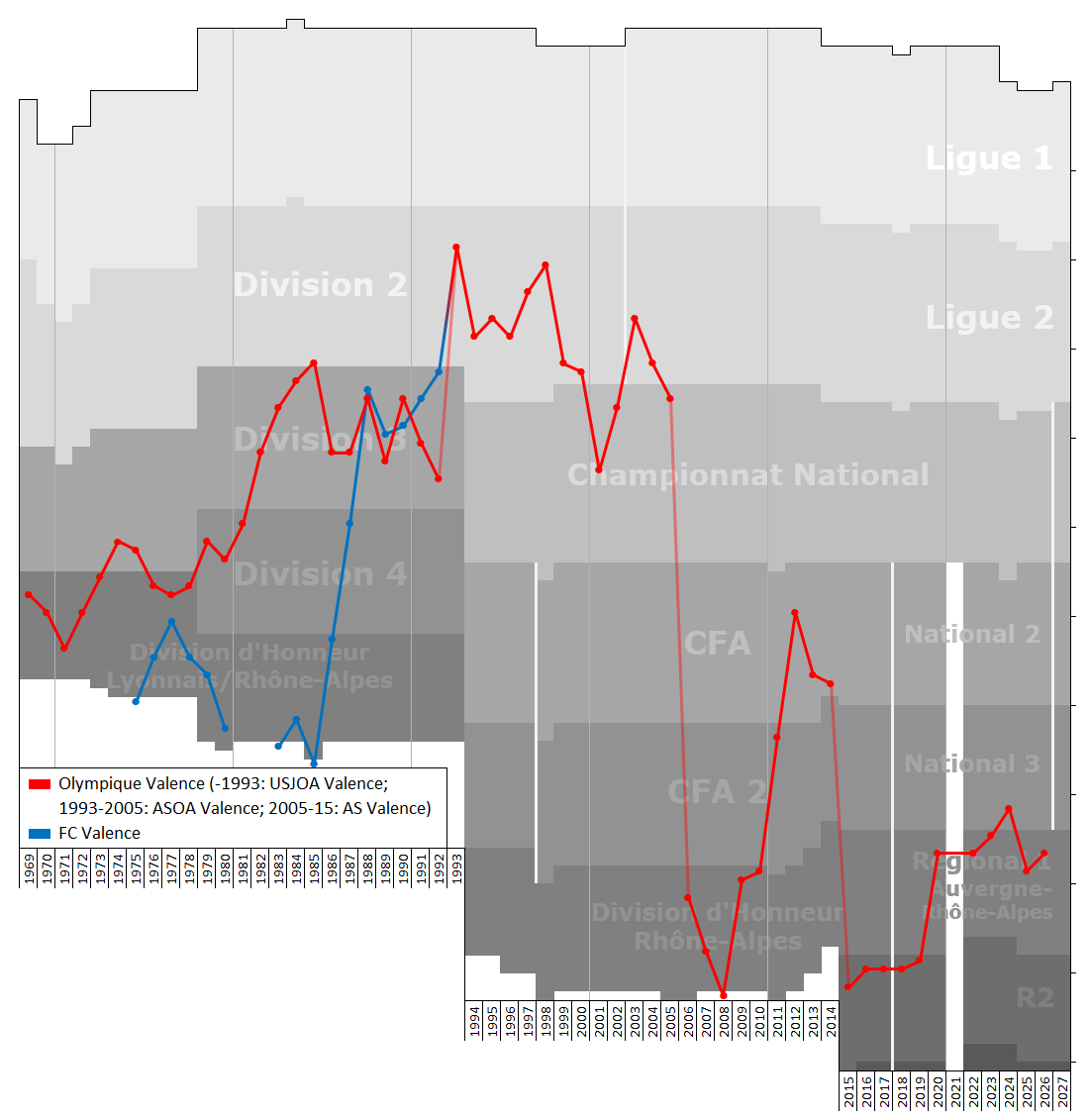
Historical league performance chart of Olympique de Valence

In 2008, the side won the DHR at the first attempt and went on to finish as runners-up in the DH in the 2008–09 season. They won the DH Rhône-Alpes in 2010, thereby earning promotion to the CFA 2 Group D for the 2010–11 campaign. Valence ended the season as runners-up to Chambéry but were nevertheless promoted to the CFA after the latter was denied promotion by the FFF.

Valence ended the 2011–12 season in sixth place in the CFA Group B, retaining their place in the division for the following campaign. Even when financial problems became apparent, it stayed for two more seasons in the CFA until the club, in the relegation area, folded in 2014 after declaring bankruptcy. Almost immediately a new club was founded and it took the name Olympique de Valence, restarting in its third regional division.

Since reforming, the club won three promotions in 2017, 2019 and 2023, to regain their place at the fifth tier.
