= François Jacques Houssemayne Du Boulay =

François Jacques Houssemayne Du Boulay (London, 24 June 1759 – 28 October 1828) was a British financier and a prominent Huguenot.

FJHDuB

== Life and career ==
Du Boulay was the son of Rev Benjamin François Houssemaine du Boulay and Louise Houssemaine du Boulay (née Lamotte) and the great-grandfather of Sir James Houssemayne Du Boulay. He married Elizabeth Paris (31 August 1775 – 19 July 1814). They had eight children.

Du Boulay was a stock jobber. At one time he was the largest holder of government stock on the Bank of England list. On his death in 1828 his fortune included almost one-third of a million sterling in 3% three per cent Consolidated Bank Annuities (equivalent to £31,304,666 in 2025). relative wealth today £553,337,397.47. He lived at “Forest Estate” at Walthamstow which was sold on his death and is now Forest School, Walthamstow.
