= Diana Boulay =

Canadian sculptor

- Born: November 22, 1946 (age 79); Montreal, Quebec, Canada
- Occupation: Sculptor

Diana Boulay (born November 22, 1946) is a Canadian artist known for her sculptures using recycled plastics and found objects.

== Early life and education ==
Boulay received a BFA degree from the University of Quebec at Montreal in 1981.

== Work ==
Boulay has been creating recycled plastic sculptures for over 45 years. Her process involves preparing discarded plastics by color, creating monochrome scenarios by interlocking the objects without glue, support frames or paint. Using recycled materials is a central aspect of her practice; even her packing cases are discarded suitcases, used rolling cabinets and pizza carrying cases. Many of her acrylic showcases are "rejects" from manufacturers, aquariums, terrariums and other containers she finds at flea markets.

Thomas Frick of Art in America magazine reviewed her work in the January 1988 issue, commenting that "What strikes one most about Boulay-Dube's constructions is their playfulness and their paradoxical formal and material purity. So far as I can discern, they entirely avoid any kind of irony or commentary that would limit their imaginative strength."

Her work is included in the collection of the Musée national des beaux-arts du Québec.
