= F. R. H. Du Boulay =

20th-century English historian

F. R. H. Du Boulay FBA
- Robin Du Boulay, July 2003
- Born: Francis Robin Houssemayne Du Boulay; 19 December 1920
- Died: 2 January 2008 (aged 87)

Academic work
- Main interests: Medieval Kent; Medieval Germany
- Notable works: An Age of Ambition (1970); Germany in the Later Middle Ages (1983); The England of Piers Plowman
- Influenced: R. W. Southern

Francis Robin Houssemayne Du Boulay (19 December 1920 – 2 January 2008) was a distinguished medieval historian and Fellow of the British Academy.

== Education ==
Known as Robin Du Boulay, he was born at Chislehurst on 19 December 1920. He lived in Alexandria, Egypt, until he was 8 years old, where his father worked. He then gained a place at Christ's Hospital, and was subsequently awarded an exhibition to read history at Balliol College, Oxford.

Du Boulay's undergraduate studies were interrupted by the Second World War, and he was commissioned in the Royal Artillery in 1943, but he returned to Balliol in 1945 and graduated with First Class honours in history in 1947.

== Career ==
Upon graduation, Du Boulay joined the faculty of the history department of Bedford College, University of London.

Du Boulay was Professor of Medieval History at the University of London from 1960 to 1982, and was elected a Fellow of the British Academy in 1980.

== Select publications ==
- The Lordship of Canterbury (1966)
- An Age of Ambition (1970)
- Germany in the Later Middle Ages (1983)
- The England of Piers Plowman (1991)
- Servants of Empire (2011 – published posthumously)
