= Île Boulay =

Island in Ivory Coast

Coordinates: 5°16′45″N 4°06′56″W

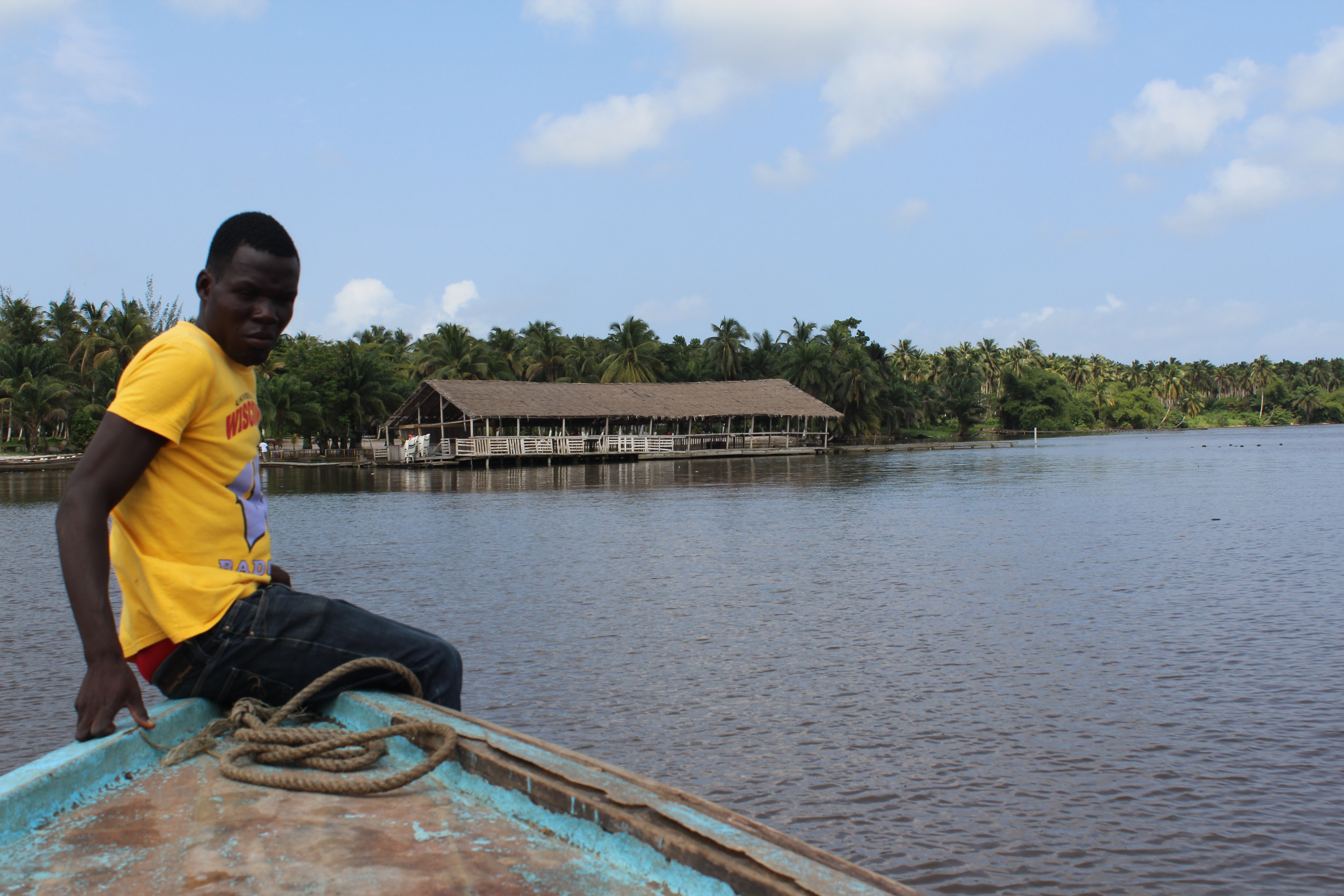
Boulay Island

Île Boulay is an island in the Ébrié Lagoon in Ivory Coast. This island is relatively unpopulated (a bit over 10,000 people) and remains in an undeveloped state, considering its proximity to the urban areas of Abidjan. Île Boulay is only 15 minutes from downtown Abidjan by boat. It contains vacation cottages for some of the richer residents of the city. Water skiing is a popular activity offshore.

Since 2008 there has been a project to extend the Autonomous Port of Abidjan to the island, and to build a bridge to it. Also in 2008, the government of Mali began construction of a warehouse for goods transshipped through Abidjan. These projects have created considerable opposition from the local residents. The waters around Île Boulay have also been affected by bacterial and chemical pollution.
