= James Houssemayne Du Boulay =

British colonial civil servant

Sir James Houssemayne Du Boulay KCIE CSI (15 April 1868 in Hampshire – 26 November 1943) was a British civil servant.

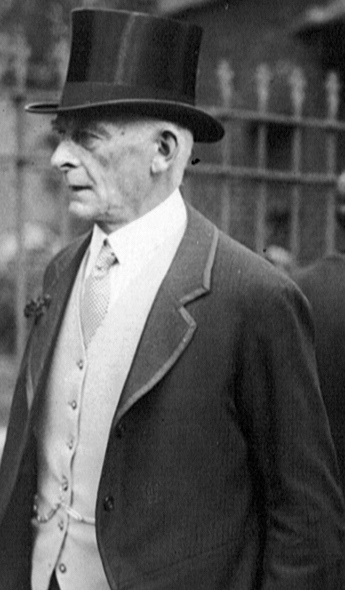
Photo of Sir James Houssemayne Du Boulay KCIE CSI

== Life and career ==
Houssemayne Du Boulay was the son of James Thomas Houssemayne Du Boulay and Alice Mead Du Boulay (née Cornish) and the great grandson of Francois Jacques Houssemayne Du Boulay. His mother's grandfather was Sir Robert Wilmot, 3rd Baronet (1765–1842) of Chaddesden. He was educated at Winchester College and Balliol College Oxford. On 31 July 1901 he married Freda Elais Butts Howell (1874–1957) granddaughter of Sir Thomas Howell. Lady Houssemayne Du Boulay was Lady-in-waiting to Queen Mary (1911, Delhi Durbar, India). They had four children.

After university, Houssemayne Du Boulay was selected for the Indian Civil Service. Thereafter his positions included:

- Bombay Presidency.
- Lt -Col Indian Defence Force.
- Private Secretary to Governor of Bombay, Lord Northcote.
- Private Secretary to Governor of Bombay, Lord Lamington.
- Secretary to the Government of Bombay Political Department.
- Private secretary to Viceroy of India, Lord Hardinge of Penshurst.
- Secretary to Government of India Home Department.
- Temporary member of Governor General's Executive Council.
- Member of Indian Jails Committee.

Houssemayne Du Boulay retired in 1922.

== See also ==
- Impact of the Hindu-German Conspiracy
