= Joséphine Boulay =

French organist, composer and professor

Joséphine Pauline Boulay
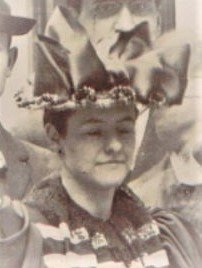
- Born: 22 May 1869; Paris, France
- Died: 5 August 1925 (aged 56); Paris, France
- Occupations: Organist, composer and professor

Joséphine Pauline Boulay (22 May 1869 – 5 August 1925) was a French organist, composer and professor.

== Career ==
Born in Paris, she became blind at age three. She began her studies with the Blind Sisters of St. Paul and then with the National Institution for the Blind. She was admitted to the Conservatoire de Paris in 1887 and studied with César Franck and Jules Massenet. In 1888, she became the first blind woman to win a first prize in organ at the Conservatoire.

Appointed a professor at the National Institution for the Blind, she took charge of the organ and composition classes there while continuing her musical apprenticeship at the Conservatoire. There, she went on to win a second prize for harmony in the class of Charles Lenepveu in 1890, a second prize for counterpoint and fugue in 1895 in the class of Jules Massenet, and finally a first prize in 1897 in the composition class of Gabriel Fauré.

For thirty-seven years she taught piano, organ, composition and harmony for young blind students at the institute. She was decorated with the Palmes académiques in 1899 for her work. She died in Paris at 56 years of age.

== Works ==
Selected works include:

- Petit Carillon
- Andante in E
- 1896
  - Chant de paix
- 1898
  - Trois Pièces pour Orgue
    - Prelude
    - Andante
    - Fugue
- 1900
  - Six Motets à la Sainte Vierge et au Saint Sacrement for voice and organ or harmonium
  - Regina coeli
- 1902
  - Suite for violin and piano
