= UMS Montélimar =

French football club

- Full name: Union Montilienne Sportive Football
- Founded: 1924
- Ground: Stade Alexandre Tropenas, Montélimar
- Capacity: 3,500
- President: André Delphine
- Manager: Yohann Febrer
- League: Régional 1 Auvergne-Rhône-Alpes (Group B)
- Website: http://www.umsfoot-montelimar.fr/
Home colours

Union Montilienne Sportive Football, commonly known as UMS Montélimar, is a French association football club based in the commune of Montélimar, in the Drôme department of south-eastern France. The club plays its home matches at the Stade Alexandre Tropenas, which has a capacity of 3,500 spectators.

Founded on 26 June 1924, the club fields teams in a range of age groups; the men's senior team currently plays in the Division d'Honneur Rhône Alpes, the sixth tier of the French football league system, and spent three seasons in Division 2 between 1970 and 1973.

== Notable players ==
- (France) Franck Sauzée

== Honours ==
- Championnat de France Amateur Group Sud: 1968–69, 1969–70
- Division 4 Group H: 1978–79
- Division d'Honneur Rhône-Alpes: 1989–90
- Division d'Honneur Lyonnais: 1961–62
