= List of people from Carlisle =

This is a list of notable people associated with Carlisle, a city in Cumbria, England.

== Born in Carlisle ==
=== Arts ===
- Matt Pagan (1993– ), singer, born in Carlisle
- John Scott (1849–1919), artist, born in Carlisle

=== Business ===
- Monkhouse Davison, 18th-century London merchant; born in Carlisle and had homes in Carlisle and Dalston, Cumbria
- Eddie Stobart, haulage contractor; he and son Edward Stobart were born near Carlisle
- Stuart Stockdale, fashion designer, former head of design at Pringle of Scotland and Jaeger

=== Literature ===
- Beatrix Campbell, feminist writer and journalist
- Peter Cox, vegetarian cookbook author
- M. W. Craven, author
- Grace Dent, restaurant critic and broadcaster
- Margaret Forster, novelist
- George MacDonald Fraser, novelist
- Maria Hack, educational writer
- Sarah Hall, Booker Prize-nominated writer and poet

=== Media ===
- Melvyn Bragg, former ITV editor, BBC presenter and Radio 4 broadcaster of In Our Time (BBC Radio 4)
- Lee Brennan, member of the boy band 911
- Isabella Brownson, actress
- Bryan Dick, TV and theatre actor, best known for his roles in Eric & Ernie, Blackpool and Torchwood
- Freda Dowie, actress
- Mike Figgis, film director, writer and composer, born in Carlisle
- Sheila Jones Harms, soprano
- Mike Harrison, lead singer of the band Spooky Tooth
- Ifor James, noted international French horn player and professor
- Jon Keighren, football commentator
- John Myers, radio executive
- Roxanne Pallett, actress, starred in Emmerdale
- Jancis Robinson, Master of Wine, journalist and wine critic
- Helen Skelton, Blue Peter presenter

=== Medicine ===
- Sir James Sawyer, physician and cancer researcher

=== Politics ===
- Robert Campbell, member of the Wisconsin State Assembly
- Nicholas Cox, first lieutenant-governor of New Carlisle, Quebec who named the community after his hometown
- Thomas Logie MacDonald, ex-mayor and astronomer who had a lunar crater named after him
- Pam McConnell, Toronto city counsellor
- Edward Tiffin, United States senator and 1st governor of Ohio

=== Sport ===
- Kieran Barton, English–American footballer and coach
- Kevin Beattie, former England football international
- Steve Borthwick, former captain of the England rugby union team
- Jarrad Branthwaite, Everton defender
- Alan Gray, football defender born 1974
- Paul Hindmarch, cricketer
- Grant Holt, Norwich City striker
- Helen Housby, netballer
- Paul Huntington, Leeds United and Newcastle United footballer
- Matt Jansen, former England U21 and Blackburn Rovers striker; born in Wetheral, near Carlisle
- Alex MacDowall, World Touring Car Championship driver
- Paul Nixon, England cricketer
- Henry Potts, cricketer and footballer
- Paul Simpson, former footballer and manager
- Lauren Smith, badminton player
- Peter Thompson, former Liverpool F.C player, born 1942
- Derek Townsley, professional footballer
- Geoff Twentyman, footballer and subsequent head scout for Liverpool F.C. under Bill Shankly; born in Brampton near Carlisle

== Resident of Carlisle ==
- William James Blacklock, 19th-century landscape artist, studied in Carlisle and later had a studio in Stanwix
- Ivor Broadis, ex England international footballer and journalist moved to Carlisle after the Second World War
- Hunter Davies, writer and journalist, brought up in Carlisle
- Rory Delap, professional footballer who played for Stoke City FC
- Richard Hammond, TV presenter, lived in Carlisle
- Charlie Hunnam, actor, attended art college in Carlisle; known for roles in the series Queer as Folk and Sons of Anarchy, and films Pacific Rim and Green Street
- Margery Jackson, miser, litigant, landlady and local character
- Richard Madeley, TV personality, worked for BBC Carlisle and Border Television
- Peter Manley, professional darts player
- Rumer, singer, attended Newman School in Carlisle
- Bill Shankly, former manager of Carlisle United
