= Aquascutum =

British luxury clothing company

- Industry: Fashion
- Founder: John Emary
- Headquarters: London, England
- Products: Menswear; Womenswear; Accessories
- Parent: Shandong Ruyi
- Website: www.aquascutum-active.com

Aquascutum is a British heritage luxury fashion house that designs, licences and distributes ready to wear and accessories. It is owned by Shandong Ruyi.

== History ==
=== Beginnings ===
Aquascutum was established in 1851, the year of the Great Exhibition, when tailor and entrepreneur John Emary opened a high quality menswear shop at 46 Regent Street. In 1853, after succeeding in producing the first waterproof wool, he had his discovery patented and renamed the company 'Aquascutum', Latin for 'watershield'. In 1901, Emary moved to 100 Regent Street. The company created other fabrics and coats using similar names, such as the Eiderscutum light overcoat and (in 1962) the multicoloured wool-yarn weave, Aquaspectrum.

Coats for officers in the Crimean War (1853–1856) were made from Aquascutum's waterproof fabric, as were the trench coats worn by soldiers of all ranks in both world wars. Domestic and fashion applications followed, promoted in the 19th century by royal fashion leader King Edward VII; he was Aquascutum's first royal client, ordering an Aquascutum coat in the Prince of Wales check. In 1897, Aquascutum was granted a royal warrant, the first that would mark the British royal family's long patronage of the company. Aquascutum's trenchcoats have been worn by three Princes of Wales, Margaret Thatcher and Winston Churchill. In 1900, Aquascutum opened a womenswear department, offering water-repellent capes and coats, which were very popular among British suffragettes.

Cary Grant wearing Aquascutum

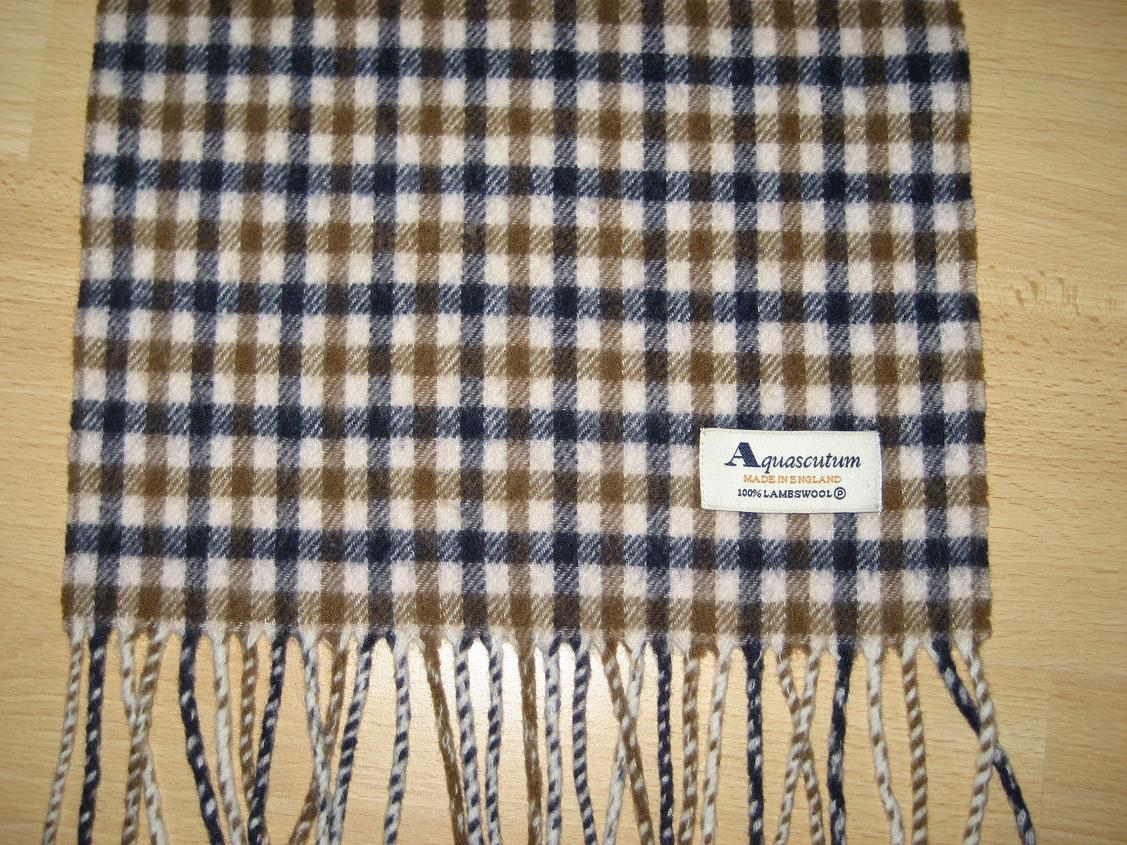
An Aquascutum scarf, showing the Club Check colours

The company has supplied aristocrats, political leaders, and actors, including three Princes of Wales, Prince Rainier of Monaco, Winston Churchill, Humphrey Bogart, Lauren Bacall, Sophia Loren, Cary Grant, Sean Connery and Michael Caine. In 1953 its wyncol fabric - designed to withstand 100 mph winds - was used by explorer Edmund Hillary in the first confirmed ascent of Mount Everest. During the 1980s and 1990s, Kingsley Matheson Pink, managing director of the Regent Street flagship store, dressed UK prime minister Margaret Thatcher, including her visit to the USSR, and comprised coats and tailored suits, dresses and evening wear. He also was subsequently responsible for dressing Prime Minister John Major, as well as a number of other international dignitaries including the King of Malaysia.

=== Renown International, 1990–2009 ===
Aquascutum was family owned until 1990, when it was purchased by Japanese textile conglomerate company Renown Incorporated for about 20 billion yen ($163.3 million)

In 2005, Renown was the Aquascutum ready-to-wear licence holder in Japan with retail value of €50 million. Also in 2005, Aquascutum presented its first runway at the London Fashion Week.

In April 2006, Aquascutum appointed Kim Winser as president and chief executive officer. By 2007, the company entered into license agreements with Novaseta, the accessories company owned by Ermenegildo Zegna, and Antichi Pellettieri to produce ties and scarves for the Aquascutum men’s and women’s collections.

In 2008, Renown announced that it would sell Aquascutum, after the parent company experienced three straight years of losses. In May 2009, Renown rejected a corporate buyout bid led by Kim Winser. After the bid was rejected, Winser left Aquascutum.

In 2009, Crombie expressed interest in Aquascutum’s U.K. and European businesses. However, Renown only continued acquisition talks with YGM Trading, a Hong Kong fashion retailer, which held licenses to sell Aquascutum clothes in Asia, the brand's biggest market; in 2008, YGM Trading hired Cantopop star Sammi Cheng to market the Aquascutum brand as part of its 160 anniversary campaign.

=== Broadwick, 2009–2012 ===
In September 2009, Broadwick Group Ltd. – the corporate vehicle of the management team behind the revival of retailer Jaeger, Harold Tillman and Belinda Earl – bought the company's non-Asia businesses for an undisclosed sum. As part of the Aquascutum deal, YGM Trading, which had been tipped as a bidder for the whole business, bought the rights for the brand's business in Asia.

Within the first year after the takeover, Graeme Fidler, head of menswear design, and Michael Herz, head of womenswear design, stepped down in 2010. From 2010 to 2012, Joanna Sykes served as the brand's design director.

However, on 17 April 2012, the Financial Times published an article citing sources "familiar with the company's plans" stating that the company would shortly go into administration with the potential loss of up to 250 jobs. In April 2012, the company indeed went into bankruptcy administration. FRP Advisory was chosen to act as the administrators. Within days, FRP Advisory began to shut down the firm’s factory in Northamptonshire.

=== YGM Trading, 2012–2017 ===
Shortly after it went into bankruptcy administration, Aquascutum's Asia licensee, YGM Trading, acquired the company for £15 million.

Under YGM's ownership, the company's primary focus was China, with 135 of its 146 outlets located in mainland China, Hong Kong, Macau and Taiwan. By 2013, the Aquascutum factory in Northamptonshire was again put up for sale, and was purchased by a British owner. The original factory was renamed The Clothing Works. The retailer had to close 14 stores in China, its main market, as well as one in Taiwan.

In 2015, Aquascutum signed a licensing deal with the Canadian firm Jaytex to distribute the main collection, 1851 London, in the U.S. and Canada. In 2016, Te Dinh Sy joined the brand as its new head of men’s wear; he took over responsibility for women’s wear in 2017, too. Under Dinh Sy, Aquascutum launched Supreme x Aquascutum, an eight-piece collection with American clothing and skateboarding lifestyle brand Supreme.

=== Shandong Ruyi, 2017–present ===
In December 2016, the BBC reported that Aquascutum was due to be sold for $120 million (£97 million) to two buyers, one of which was Chinese textile firm Shandong Ruyi. The unnamed acquirers made a $5m down payment for exclusive rights to the deal. In March 2017, YGM Trading confirmed it would sell Aquascutum to Jining Ruyi Investment Co, a holding company of Shandong Ruyi, for $117 million (£95 million).

In September 2020, Aquascutum went into administration again. In the same month, Aquascutum granted Trinity Limited exclusive rights to design, manufacture and distribute its products in Greater China and appointed Trinity as its exclusive licensing agent to manage its global licensing business.

== Campaigns ==
Aquascutum campaigns have in the past featured Pierce Brosnan (2006), Julia Stegner (2006), Brett Anderson (2007), Gisele Bündchen (2007–2008), Jamie Dornan (2007–2008), Karlie Kloss (2010), Guinevere Van Seenus (2012), and Damian Lewis (2014).

== Royal Warrants ==
Aquascutum's first royal warrant

- 1897 The Prince of Wales, later King Edward VII
- 1903 The Prince of Wales, later King George V
- 1911 King George V
- 1920 The Prince of Wales, later the Duke of Windsor
- 1947 Queen Elizabeth, Queen Consort to King George VI
- 1952 Queen Elizabeth The Queen Mother

== Coat of arms ==
Coat of arms of Aquascutum
| Crest Mantled gules doubled Argent a demi lion rampant guardant per fess Or and Gules grasping in the dexter claw a sword bendwise Gules pommeau hilt and quillons Gold bearing on the sinister foreleg a shield of the arms. Escutcheon Azure gutty d'eau a crown Or a chief nebuly Argent. Motto In Hoc Scuto Fideamus. |
