= Jon Moulton =

British venture capitalist

Jonathan Paul Moulton CBE (born 15 October 1950) is a British venture capitalist. He is the founder and managing partner of private equity firm Better Capital, and the former managing partner of private equity firm Alchemy Partners. He has been working in private equity since 1980. Moulton writes, broadcasts and speaks on corporate finance and financial matters. His career has also included spells running Citicorp Venture Capital, Schroder Ventures (Permira) and the buy-out group of Apax, as well as being a director of numerous public and private companies.

According to The Sunday Times Rich List in 2019, Moulton is worth £182 million.

In July 2022, Moulton was awarded an Honorary Doctorate by Lancaster University.

== Early life ==
Moulton is originally from Stoke-on-Trent, and suffered ill health at an early age due to the coal smoke in the area. He was educated at Hanley High School and Lancaster University, where he earned a degree in chemistry. He then trained as a chartered accountant with Coopers & Lybrand in Liverpool.

== Career ==
Moulton joined Coopers & Lybrand in 1972, and later moved to their New York office. He left in 1980 to join Citicorp Venture Capital, and became managing director in London. He was managing partner of Schroder Ventures from 1985 to 1994, where investments included Parker Pens and Sheffield Forgemasters. He then did a spell at Apax Partners before founding Alchemy.

=== Alchemy ===
In 1997 he founded a new venture capital firm, Alchemy.

Moulton has earned a reputation for outspokenness. He has criticised attempts by private equity firms to deflect criticism. He has also spoken out against the favourable tax treatment of private equity. In July 2007, he gave evidence to a Treasury Select Committee of the House of Commons enquiring into the private equity industry, when he accused private equity firms of abusing a generous tax regime. Later that year he criticised the accountancy profession for a loss of integrity in due diligence work on private equity buyouts. Despite being an outspoken critic of offshore, Moulton has a residence in low-tax Guernsey in addition to a Guernsey-domiciled investment company.

Moulton resigned from Alchemy in September 2009, saying that he disagreed with plans by other partners to turn Alchemy into a specialist financial services firm. Moulton also apologised to investors for making "too many investment and people errors", and that he will do investment again "but better", (hence the name Better Capital").

=== Better Capital ===
Moulton set up Better Capital at the end of 2009, making its first investment in February 2010 when it acquired Gardner from Carlyle Group. The fund made 9 investments, including a management buyout of the UK arm of Reader's Digest in a £13 million deal with the company's administrator, Moore Stephens and purchased the luxury motor yacht manufacturer Fairline Boats (based in Oundle) from 3i, at a cost of approximately £35 million.

Following the Installation Dinner of Mary Collis as Master of the Worshipful Company of Management Consultants at the Carpenter's Hall in October 2011, Moulton was admitted as an Honorary Freeman of the Company, in recognition of his long standing support of the Company and of outstanding service to private equity and the management consultancy industry.

Better Capital raised a second fund in 2012 which made 6 investments: City Link, Everest, iNTERTAIN, Jaeger, Northern Aerospace and SPOT.

The resuscitation plan for City Link, bought for a notional £1 on 26 April 2013, failed and it was put into liquidation on Christmas Day, 25 December 2014, effective 31 December 2014. Customers with goods in their depots were given just one day to collect their goods at their own expense. The timing of the announcement was criticised, given that the only thing keeping the company solvent from the start was the capital injection of its owners.

== Personal life ==
Moulton is married with two children and now lives in Guernsey. He is an active private investor and a director of numerous public and private companies. He is chairman of finnCap and Anti-Microbial Research Limited. Other personal investments include: Ashmore, Funding Circle, The Guernsey Pub Company, Manolete Partners and Atom Bank. Moulton is a member of the Board of the Corporate Finance Faculty of the Institute of Chartered Accountants and a director of the think tank, The Centre for Policy Studies.

Moulton is an honorary fellow of University College London and a Trustee of the UK Stem Cell Foundation and the J P Moulton Charitable Foundation.

== Charity Trust ==
The Jon Moulton Charity Trust was set up in 2018 to continue the work of his previous charity, J P Moulton Charitable Foundation which was established in 2004. The principal aim of the Charity is to fund non-commercial clinical trials with the aim to make clinical advances and promote the relief of suffering.

Since its inception, the charity has funded over 150 clinical trials which have been selected based on high quality science with the potential to have a direct benefit to patients. The trials have been conducted in a wide range of therapy areas including respiratory, women's health, oncology, cardiovascular, diabetes, multiple sclerosis, several rare diseases, COPD, paediatrics and the funded trials are usually interventional. The Foundation has also entered into several joint ventures with other medical charities to help support larger trials. As of May 2020, Moulton has committed £47 million to clinical trials.

In the 2024 Birthday Honours, Moulton was appointed a Commander of the Order of the British Empire (CBE) for charitable service.
