= Buffini =

Buffini is a surname. Notable people with the surname include:

- Brian Buffini (Born 1967), Irish-American Real State Businessman
- Damon Buffini (born 1962), British businessman
- Moira Buffini (born 1965), British dramatist, director, and actor
