= Queen Elizabeth Trust =

United Kingdom-based charity

- Formation: 2026; 0 years ago
- Type: Charity
- Headquarters: 100 Parliament Street; London, England SW1A 2BQ
- Region served: United Kingdom
- Patron: Charles III
- Chair: Sir Damon Buffini
- Website: www.queenelizabethtrust.org

The Queen Elizabeth Trust is a United Kingdom-based independent charity established to mark the 100th anniversary of Queen Elizabeth II's birth. Her son and successor, King Charles III, was named as the organisation's inaugural patron. The charity was launched on 21 April 2026, the 100th anniversary of Queen Elizabeth II's birth. The UK Government provided a one-off £40 million endowment as initial funding. The main goal of the charity is to strengthen communities across the UK by supporting and revitalising shared local spaces. It aims to fund and restore community hubs like parks and gathering places, help bring people together across different backgrounds, and support local groups with resources, skills, and training to run events and activities.
