= Drumohr =

Italian knitwear brand

Robertson S.r.l
- Trade name: Drumohr
- Industry: Fashion
- Founded: 1773; 253 years ago
- Founder: James Paterson
- Owner: Ciocca
- Website: drumohr.com

Drumohr is a luxury Italian fashion brand specialising in knitwear. It originated in Scotland in 1773.

== History ==
The company was founded by James Paterson in Dumfries, Scotland in 1773 as J.A. Robertson & Sons, a hosiery manufacturer producing stocking and gloves. In 1805 he moved to the farm of Nunland on the road to Castle Douglas.

In 1851, it exhibited a sample of hand framed hosiery at the London Great Exhibition.

At the end of the 19th century, it opened a new factory in Dumfries to produce hosiery, gloves and socks, then also fully-fashioned wool and cashmere outerwear.

Stockings in jacquard colour patterns were sold to members of the Royal Family, including George V and Queen Mary. In 1927, the Prince of Wales (later Edward VIII) was photographed wearing a Drumohr sweater and socks on the golf course, giving further publicity to the brand.

During World War II, the factory was requisitioned and the Robertson brothers were required to teach the owners of rivals McGeorge and Pringle the methods of manufacturing Drumohr's knitwear.

Facing overseas competition and several changes of ownership, the Dumfries factory closed in 2003. In the 1990s, its Dumfries competitor McGeorge was similarly forced to close.

In 2006, the brand was bought by the Italian company Ciocca Group. Clothing has been produced in Italy under the name "Drumohr" since then.
