= Harold Tillman =

English retail entrepreneur and investor

Harold Tillman CBE
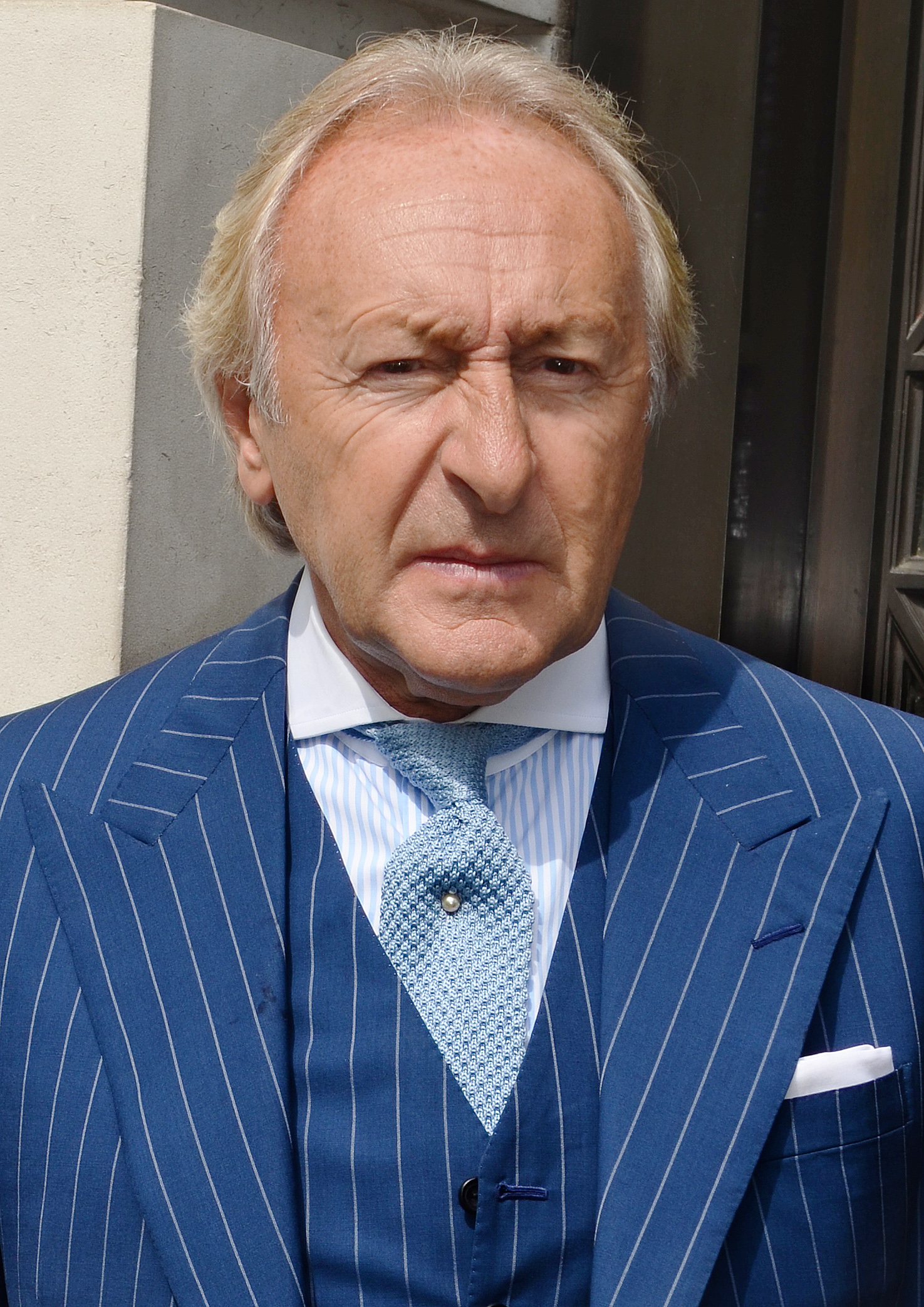
- Tillman in 2013
- Born: 15 October 1945 (age 80)
- Education: London College of Fashion
- Occupation: Businessman
- Spouse: Stephanie
- Children: 2

Harold Tillman CBE (born 15 October 1945) is an English retail entrepreneur and investor. He was formerly head of Jaeger and Aquascutum, and has been awarded CBE in 2010. Until September 2014, Tillman was chair of the British Fashion Council. In 2016, he became chair of the Ethical Fashion Group and in 2016 he was appointed Chair of Fashion Matters, London College of Fashion's fundraising committee. In 2019, he was Chief Barker of Variety the children's charity. Most recently, in 2020, Tillman was appointed Enterprise and Business Advisor for the London College of Fashion.

== Early life ==
Tillman was born into a Jewish family and grew up in south London. He was the only child of a Yorkshire-born tailor father who trained at Montague Burton's, and a milliner mother. As his father's business developed, the family moved to Streatham and then Wimbledon, where Tillman went to Balham Central School for Boys.

== Career ==
As his father had been injured in World War II and suffered poor health, Tillman ran the whole family business for extended periods. He left school at 15 to study to be an accountant, before becoming one of the first male students at the London College of Fashion in 1962.

Aged 19, on graduation in 1965 he became an apprentice at Lincroft in Savile Row, becoming its managing director in 1966. Tillman acquired Kilgour, a Savile Row tailors, which he merged with Lincroft, forming Lincroft Kilgour plc. Aged 24 he floated Lincroft Kilgour on the London Stock Exchange in 1969, becoming the youngest British person to float on the UK Stock Market. Tillman developed a business plan based around good design, employing a young Paul Smith; and using George Best to promote the clothes. Tillman sold out in 1974, as a multi millionaire aged 29.

Under a UK non compete contract, he went to the USA and set up a fashion design business, and at the same time discovered the all new American Style Cocktail bars. He brought the concept to London, opening Rumours Cocktail Bars in Covent Garden.

After the non-compete expired, Tillman made a full bid for Sumrie Clothes plc, a public company which was at the top end of menswear. The company was then trading at a loss and Tillman went into the business and successfully returned it to profits. He faced a takeover bid and accepted.

In 1987, Tillman became Non-Executive Chairman of Honorbilt a Men’s Fashion Group.

=== 2000 onwards ===
Tillman led the buy out of BMB, a suits wholesaler that supplies Debenhams, Bhs and other retail chains, from William Baird.

Tillman returned to prominence with the 2002 majority investment in loss-making Jaeger, which he acquired from Richard Thompson. Tillman teamed up with Belinda Earl. After buying Allders, a large department store in Croydon in 2005, in 2009 the team bought Aquascutum. On 16 April 2012 it was announced that Tillman had sold Jaeger to Jon Moulton's Better Capital for just under £20m with a "substantial majority" used to settle its debts. Tillman retains 10% of the shares.

Tillman retains interests in restaurants, including First Restaurant Group – which includes The Waterway and The Clerk & Well – created with his son Mitchell Tillman.

In 2008 Tillman was made an Honorary Professor of the University of Arts. Tillman was appointed Commander of the Order of the British Empire (CBE) for services to the fashion industry in the 2010 Birthday Honours. In 2014 he was awarded the Freedom of the City of London. In November 2020, he was appointed as London College of Fashion's Enterprise and Business Advisor.

== Charity and community ==
In 2006, Tillman formed his own charity and set up a scholarship at the London College of Fashion, pledging £1 million to sponsor 10 MA students each year. He sits on the board of the Fashion Enterprise Forum, which raises cash for young industry entrepreneurs. Tillman was the longest serving Chairman of the British Fashion Council, a role he took over from Sir Stuart Rose. Tillman chaired the Alumni Board for the University of the Arts London, and was also a Trustee of the V&A. In 2019, Tillman became Chief Barker of Variety the children's charity. Most recently, in 2020, he was appointed Enterprise and Business Advisor to the London College of Fashion (UAL).

=== Personal life ===
Tillman and his wife Stephanie live in Highgate, North London. The couple have two adult children.
