= John Emary =

British tailor and businessman

- Born: 1810 or 1811; Lullingstone, Kent, England
- Died: England
- Occupation(s): Tailor, businessman
- Known for: Founder of Aquascutum
- Spouse: Elizabeth
- Children: 3

John Emary (born 1810 or 1811) was a British tailor and businessman, and the founder of the fashion brand Aquascutum.

== Biography ==
John Emary was born in Lullingstone, Kent in either 1810 or 1811.

In 1851, Emary opened a menswear shop in London's Regent Street. Later in the 1850s, he patented a method of producing a water-repellent textile, and founded Aquascutum, using the Latin aqua (water) and scutum (shield).

In the 1871 census, he was aged 60, and a "merchant tailor", living in Islington, with his wife Elizabeth, three children (Mary, George M, and Susan Meears), two grandchildren, sister-in-law and one servant.

In the late 1870s, Emary and his son George Moore Emary (1850-1937) handed over control of Aquascutum to Scantlebury & Commin.
