= Red Star Parcels =

British Rail courier service

- Founded: April 1963
- Defunct: January 1999
- Fate: Acquired by Lynx Express
- Parent: British Rail

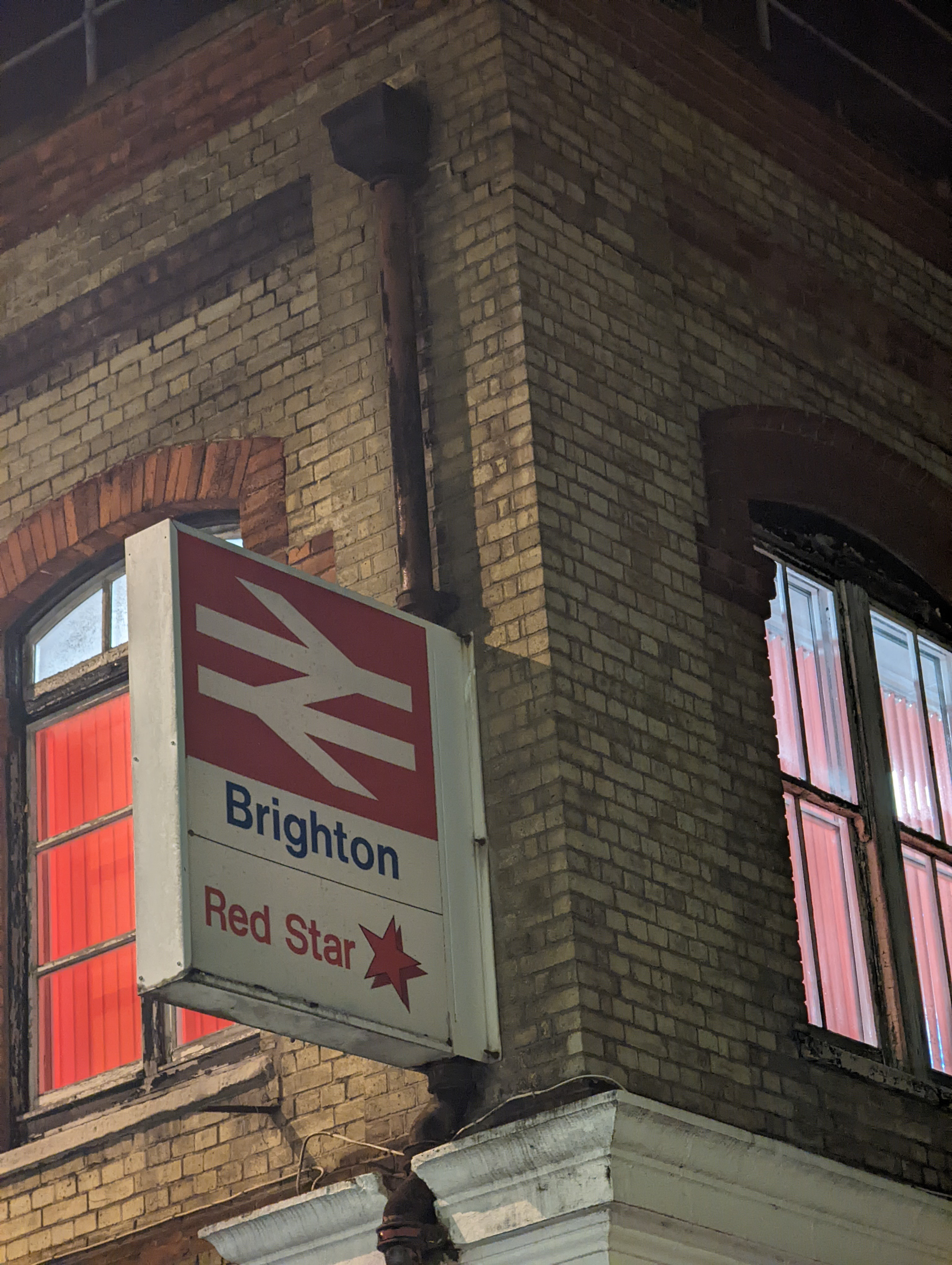
Red Star Parcels sign at Brighton station in March 2022, since removed

Red Star Parcels was a railway-centric registered courier service owned and operated by British Rail. It used passenger trains for transporting parcels between passenger railway stations throughout the United Kingdom.

Red Star was introduced experimentally on 1 April 1963. The service made use of scheduled trains, and as such, was one of the fastest methods of transporting a package long distances around the country. Senders could dispatch their consignments to selected stations at which the parcels were collected by the recipient. During 1969, the road-based City Link Transport Services Limited was started by British Rail; the two entities closely collaborated to facilitate door-to-door parcel deliveries. Red Star proved to be a profitable concern through to the early 1990s.

Amid the wider privatisation of British Rail during the 1990s, politicians sought to sell off Red Star. Multiple efforts were undertaken towards this end, including a heavy restructuring of the business. Failing to agree terms with any of the external bidders, Red Star was instead privatised via a management buyout on 5 September 1995 for a relatively small sum. During January 1999, Red Star was acquired by Lynx Express. On 25 May 2001, Lynx Express decided to shut down all of Red Star's station-based offices and attributed this decision had been taken in response to the substantial disruption across the rail network in the aftermath of the Hatfield rail crash of October 2000. While Red Star has been discontinued, other private companies have since endeavoured to revive activity in the sector.

== History ==
=== Origins ===
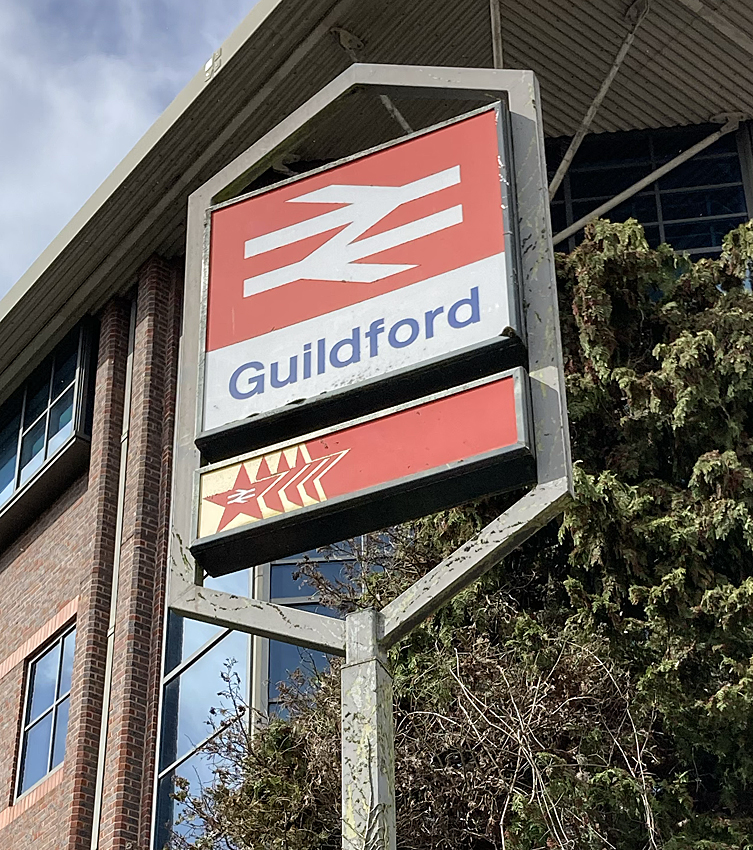
Guildford station sign with Red Star Parcels logo, 2023

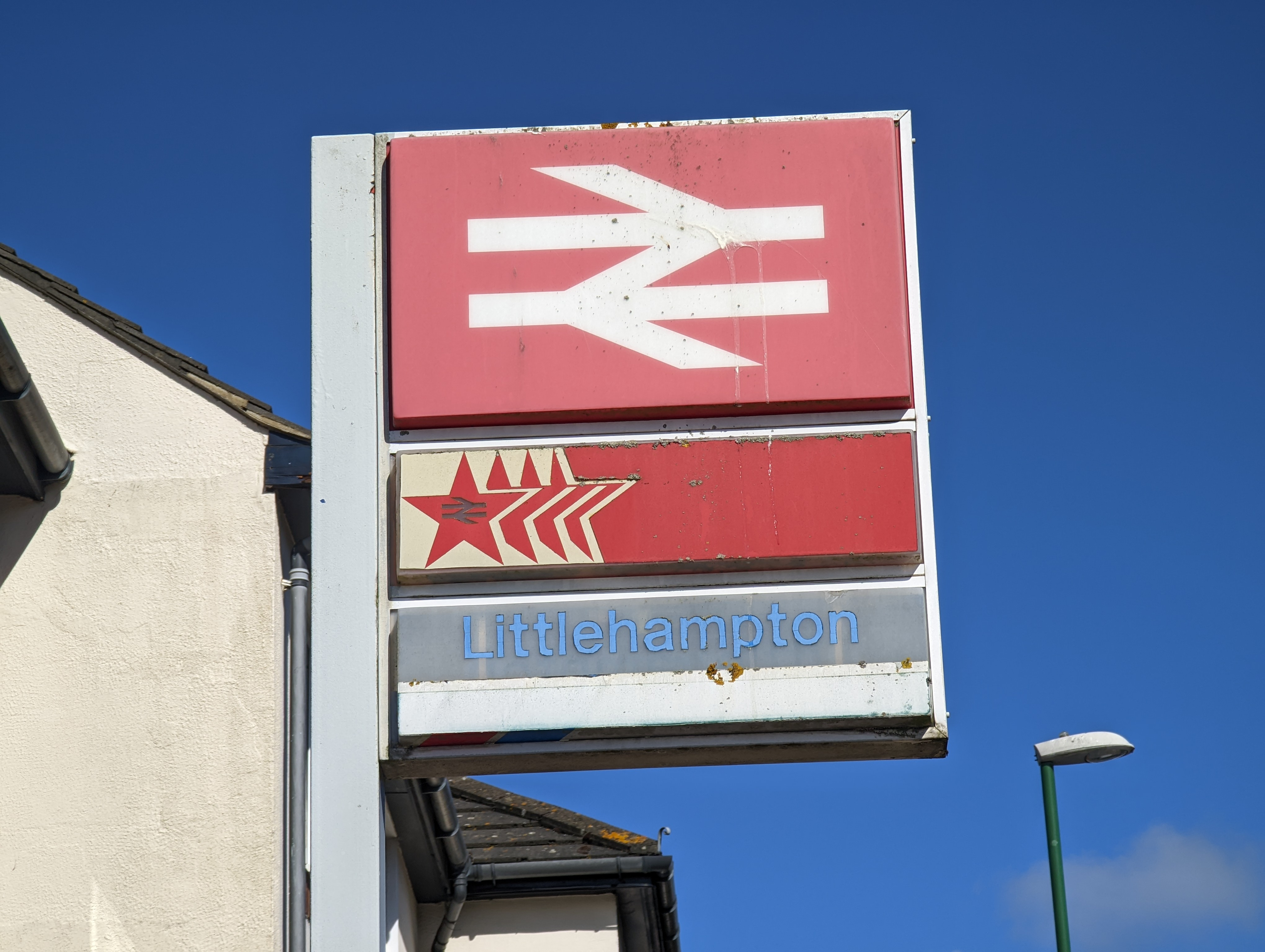
Red Star Parcels sign at Littlehampton station in June 2022

Since the early years of Britain's railways, various private companies carried parcel traffic onboard passenger trains; some opted to establish dedicated offices and other facilities at their stations, while others even resorted to using dedicated parcel trains where volume proved to be persistently high.

On 1 April 1963, British Rail established Red Star, an express registered parcel delivery service to compete against the General Post Office.

=== Association with City Link ===
During 1969, City Link Transport Services Limited (a private company) was established in order to offer a transfer service between London termini. Shortly thereafter, City Link introduced the concept of same and next day delivery throughout the United Kingdom, utilising the Red Star parcels service to transport its packages from station to station where City Link agents (later to become franchisees) would collect and deliver the final mile.

So successful was this service that City Link promoted it as Red Star Parcels Door to Door. The concept was also promoted widely by British Rail's own freight sales force, which later helped City Link to become the largest single user of Red Star. During 1982, British Rail introduced its own door to door parcels service, calling it Night Star, a brand which was later quietly dropped. City Link was appointed as the delivery agent with a five-year contract (and a two-year extension) and this eventually led to the downfall of the relationship between the two organisations. In 1989, following suspicions and allegations that both parties were competing directly with each other, City Link started the transition of moving its parcels from rail to road; one year later, the company declared that it would no longer deliver on behalf of Red Star. In response, Red Star sought out new hauliers for its parcels traffic.

=== Management buyout ===
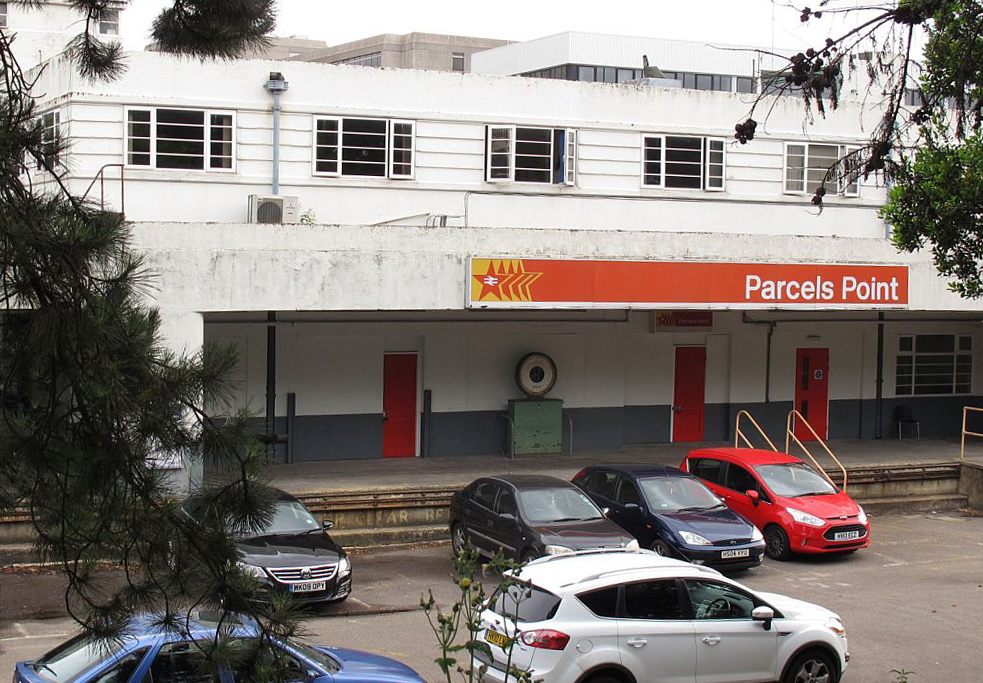
Red Star parcels point at Southampton Central

During the early 1990s, the British government embarked upon the privatisation of Red Star; this move came as part of the wider Privatisation of British Rail, which led to the creation of private passenger train companies, and the loss of a national network heralded the start of the demise of Red Star. The British Railways Board launched an effort to sell it during June 1993, attracting seven bids. Only two of these were considered to be serious; and in November 1993, the board recommended that the sale be abandoned. At one stage, negotiations were undertaken between the officials and British Bus, but the company was unable to satisfy the fast schedule sought. Between 1993 and 1994, John MacGregor, Secretary of State for Transport, made further efforts to sell off Red Star. As part of these efforts, heavy restructuring, involving office closures and job cuts, were enacted.

On 5 September 1995, Red Star was sold off via a management buyout in exchange for a peppercorn rent; the cost of the sale was recorded as £0.3 million. The sale was politically controversial at the time; specifically, it was opposed by the Labour Party in part due to the meagre amount of money received by the British government in exchange.

=== Acquisition by Lynx Express ===
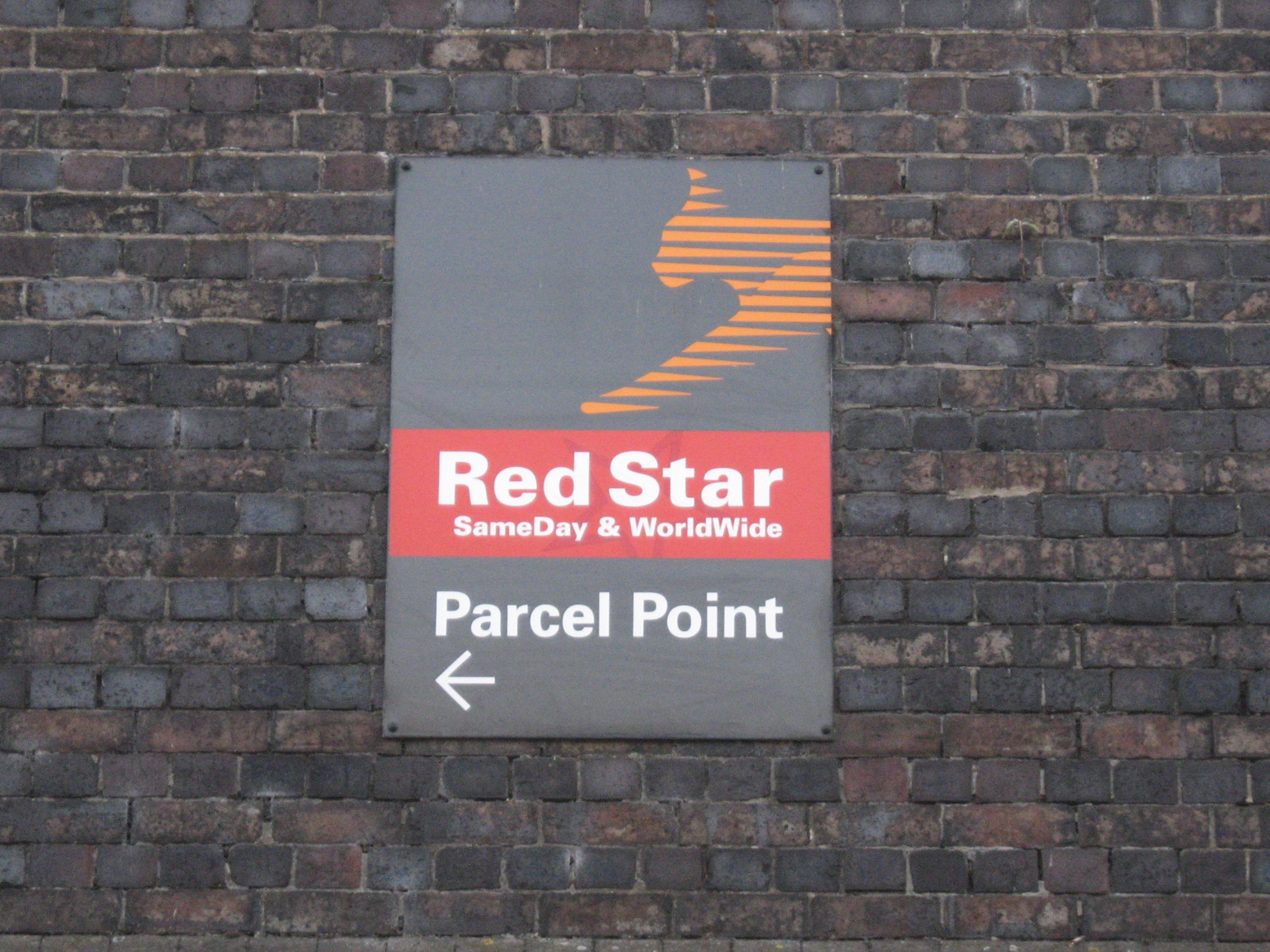
Red Star Parcels sign at Reading, 2009. Note "Lynx" logo

During January 1999, Red Star was acquired by Lynx Express; at the time of the acquisition, it was stated that the Red Star brand would continue to be used while also remaining as a separate legal entity from its new parent company. The transaction made Lynx the largest independent parcel courier active in the British Isles.

=== Closure ===
On 25 May 2001, all Red Star Parcels offices in stations were closed permanently, resulting in the loss of 360 jobs. Lynx stated that the closure decision had been taken in response to the significant disruption across the rail network, including the imposition of mass speed restrictions and substantial track replacement works, that were rapidly enacted in the aftermath of the Hatfield rail crash of October 2000. Lynx's request to the Strategic Rail Authority for a grant to offset the losses from this disruption had been rejected. The company also claimed that it remained dedicated to the rail sector, and was reportedly studying on a dedicated parcel-carrying high-speed train service between England and Scotland.

While Red Star ceased trading, signage bearing the logo of Red Star continued to be present at numerous railway stations across the United Kingdom, including; Bradford Interchange, Bournemouth Central, Birmingham New Street, Littlehampton, London Euston, York, Derby, Stoke-On-Trent, Stafford, Southend Victoria, Great Yarmouth and more.

=== Aftermath ===
Since the closure of Red Star, multiple companies have investigated the prospects of relaunching rail-based parcel services. During 2011, a new startup 5PL Ltd was launched, initially carrying parcels on scheduled East Midlands Trains passenger services. Renamed InterCity RailFreight Ltd, the parcel-carrying services have since expanded onto other franchised passenger train networks including Great Western Railway. InterCity RailFreight secured a national rail industry award in 2017 for service innovation.

During the late 2010s, the rolling stock specialist Rail Operations Group (ROG) had formulated ambitious plans to launch a high speed logistics service under the branding of Orion. The firm hopes to drive a modal shift from road towards the railway, observing the market for parcels and express delivery to be valued at £16.7 billion alone. While conventional freight operator have offered the market relatively inflexible timetables, management believe that flexibility and high speeds would positively influence customers. The company reportedly aims to offer freight services at speeds of up to 125mph across the railway network via the procurement of a new generation of traction. By travelling at such high speeds, logistics services could slot into existing paths along the East Coast Main Line and the West Coast Main Line, alleviating capacity issues. ROG has speculated on using various existing traction, including the Class 91, Class 90, as well as the new-built Class 93, hauling consists of converted Mark 3 carriages.
