= Damon Buffini =

British businessman (born 1962)

Sir Damon Buffini CVO
- Born: Damon Marcus Buffini; May 1962 (age 64); Leicester, England
- Education: St John's College, Cambridge; Harvard Business School
- Occupation: Businessman
- Employers: BBC; Wellcome Trust; Permira; Schroder Ventures Europe; LEK Partnership
- Spouse(s): Deborah Chao, Lady Buffini
- Children: 3

Sir Damon Marcus Buffini CVO (born May 1962) is a British businessman, deputy chair of the BBC Board and chair of the BBC Commercial Board. He was formerly head of the private equity company Permira and governor of the Wellcome Trust.

== Education and early life ==
Born in Leicester in 1962, the son of an African-American serviceman and a British woman, he was educated at Gateway Grammar-Technical School in Leicester and graduated with a degree in law from St John's College, Cambridge, and has an MBA from Harvard Business School.

== Career ==
Buffini worked for L.E.K. Consulting, and under the firm's scholarship scheme undertook an MBA from Harvard Business School. On return to the UK he joined Imperial Group working as a management consultant, before being recruited by Jon Moulton (now head of rival firm Better Capital), in 1988 to join Schroders leveraged buyout team, known then as Schroder Ventures Europe.

Buffini became a partner in 1992, and was promoted to managing partner of the UK business in 1999, and managing partner in 2000, just before he led a management buyout group and renamed the firm Permira. Buffini took home £3.2 million plus bonuses in 2004.

In November 2021 he was appointed as a non-executive director of the BBC Board, effective from 1 January 2022, and subsequently also as chair of the BBC's commercial board. In December 2022 the BBC Board created the honorary title of deputy chair to be held ex-officio by the chair of the BBC commercial board, with Buffini assuming the title on 9 December 2022.

== Other ==
Buffini was also a non-executive board member of SVG Capital plc and chairman and co-founder of the Social Business Trust.

Buffini established The Buffini Chao Foundation with his wife, Lady (Deborah) Buffini, in 2005.

He is a main board member of the Royal Shakespeare Company and a trustee of the Royal Anniversary Trust, which administers The Queen's Anniversary Prizes for Higher and Further Education.

In September 2012 Buffini was appointed to the board of governors at The Wellcome Trust.

In July 2020, the UK Government announced Buffini as chair of the Culture Recovery Board, an administrative body tasked with managing the £1.57bn Culture Recovery Fund intended to protect UK arts and heritage assets during the COVID-19 crisis.

Buffini was appointed Chair of the Royal National Theatre in 2016.

== Recognition ==
Buffini was ranked first in the men's Top 10 of the 2007 Powerlist, a publication ranking the most influential Black Britons. Buffini's influence has also been recognised in Business, having ranked number three by the Times Power 100 for people who hold sway over British Business. Boasting power and influence, together with a personal fortune of between £100m and £200m. Buffini was appointed to then Prime Minister Gordon Brown's business advisory panel.

Buffini was knighted in the 2016 Birthday Honours for voluntary and charitable services.

== Personal life ==
Married to a solicitor, Deborah (née Chao), the couple have three children and a family home in Weybridge and a city flat in Wandsworth.

Buffini plays tennis and golf, football for a local amateur side, and supports Arsenal.
