= Social Business Trust =

British charity

Social Business Trust (SBT) is a registered UK charity established in December 2010 by Damon Buffini and social entrepreneur Adele Blakebrough MBE. The organisation provides grants and business advice to social enterprises based in the UK, in order to support the growth of selected social enterprises and help them to achieve greater social impact.

== History ==
The six founding partners of the fund are Bain & Company, Clifford Chance, Credit Suisse, Ernst & Young, Permira and Thomson Reuters. They have committed cash, which will be given out in the form of grants and pro-bono support, with the aim of rapidly growing more than 20 social enterprises. CEO Adele Blakebrough, co-founder and former Chief Executive of Community Action Network, and Damon Buffini, partner and former chairman of private equity firm Permira, initially worked together in 2005, supporting social enterprises to scale up. Since inception, Social Business Trust has made six investments in UK based social enterprises:

- Women Like Us
- The Challenge Network
- Moneyline
- London Early Years Foundation
- Inspiring Futures Foundation
- Bikeworks

== Policy and influence ==
The Trust is part of a wider movement of venture philanthropy and socially responsible investing. In the UK, this movement has gained momentum over the past 10 years, with numerous investment bodies growing and establishing financial products to suit a nascent market. Alongside this organisation, others include Charity Bank, UnLtd, Venturesome, the Bridges Venture Social Entrepreneurs Fund, and Esmée Fairbairn.

The concept of socially responsible business has become popular rhetoric for the coalition government, in part as a response to the 2008 global recession. The political response has resulted in closer scrutiny on the city of London, the large investment banks, and their links to social responsibility. SBT co-founder and chairman Damon Buffini's actions in both business and venture philanthropy are closely followed in the press and by political think tank organisations such as Policy Exchange. The organisation was included as a case study in the 2011 Giving White Paper as an example of how to donate professional and specialist skills.

SBT's portfolio director, James Wise, acted as a specialist advisor for the 2011 select committee report on the progress of The Big Society. The 'Big Society' policy and ongoing political focus has had a significant impact on public discourse on social investment and social enterprise, and has led to the creation of the Big Society Capital(BSC), a government led social investment fund. SBT's CEO, Adele Blakebrough, is part of the sector advisory group for the development of and launch of the BSC.
