= Lynx Express (parcels) =

- Industry: Courier service
- Founded: 1955
- Defunct: 2005
- Fate: Acquired by UPS
- Successor: UPS
- Headquarters: Nuneaton, England
- Key people: David Burtenshaw (Chief Executive)
- Number of employees: 3,500

Lynx Express (stylised as Lynx Express) was a courier (parcel delivery) company operating principally in the United Kingdom. It was acquired in July 2005 by UPS.

== History ==
The company's history dates back to the nationalisation of the British Railways after World War II. Each of the pre-nationalisation companies had formed a local delivery network, based on lorries and vans, to extend the railway to customers' doors, thus enabling parcels and light freight to be delivered in the control of the railway company. In 1955, these services were amalgamated to form a division of British Road Services, known as BRS Parcels. Those amalgamated companies handling rail transport became known as National Carriers, while BRS Parcels became Roadline.

In 1982, the Conservative Government led by Margaret Thatcher privatised these services, making shares in the newly formed National Freight Corporation available to employees at a price that proved to undervalue the company when they were floated on the stock market. Two businesses, National Carriers and Roadline, subsequently merged and operated briefly under the name National Carriers Roadline before becoming Lynx Express Delivery Network. This remained the company's full title, although it was shortened in practice. Following a reorganisation, rationalisation of core business interests and rebranding exercise, National Freight Corporation, by this time shortened to NFC plc, merged with Ocean Group plc and became known as Exel, and Lynx Express was seen as outside its main area of concentration.

In 1997, Lynx Express Delivery Network was the subject of a management buyout from Exel and subsequently renamed Lynx Express. Lynx Express became majority owned by Bridgepoint Capital. The company acquired British Rail’s remaining local delivery asset, Red Star Parcels, in January 1999.

In 2005, Lynx Express was acquired by UPS for £55.5 million (US$97.1 million). At the time, Lynx Express was one of the largest parcel carriers in the UK, with sales of $295 million (£170 million) for the financial year ending 2 October 2004. The company was subsequently integrated into UPS, and the Lynx brand disappeared.
