= Kim Winser =

British businesswoman and executive

Dr Kim Winser OBE
- Born: 11 March 1959 (age 67); Helensburgh, Scotland
- Occupation: Businesswoman
- Years active: 1977–present
- Employer: Winser London
- Organization(s): Marks & Spencer; Pringle of Scotland; Aquascutum; Agent Provocateur
- Known for: Chief Executive Officer; Founder of Winser London
- Awards: BBC's 100 Women (2014)

Kim Lesley Winser (born 11 March 1959) is a British businesswoman and CEO of the womenswear label, Winser London. Winser was the youngest-appointed female commercial divisional board director at Marks & Spencer, a former CEO at Pringle of Scotland and Aquascutum, and former chairman of Agent Provocateur. In 2006, Winser was awarded an Order of the British Empire (OBE) for services to the British fashion industry.

== Early life and education ==
Kim Winser was born in Helensburgh, Scotland and educated at Purbrook Grammar School, Hampshire, England. Winser is a former competitive tennis player and continues to play recreationally.

== Career ==
Winser began her career with Marks & Spencer having joined the Management Training Scheme in 1977. Winser's rise through the ranks culminated in her appointment as Marks & Spencer's youngest Divisional Board Director, as Director of Womenswear, the Company's largest division at the time.

Winser went on to deliver successful turnarounds for the iconic British heritage brands Pringle of Scotland (2000 - 2006) as Chief Executive Officer, and Aquascutum (2006 - 2009) as Global President and Chief Executive Officer. Winser is credited with repositioning both brands from traditional fashion houses into contemporary global names. Winser launched Pringle of Scotland's first dedicated flagship store on Bond Street, in the UK. She also secured a number of high-profile celebrity partnerships which included Pierce Brosnan and Gisele Bündchen who both fronted campaigns for Aquascutum.

Winser's turnarounds of Pringle of Scotland and Aquascutum were featured by the BBC in two separate programmes. During this period Winser also worked with the Scottish cashmere and British wool industries, supporting initiatives, growth and exports.

Following her tenure at Aquascutum, Winser was brought on by 3i, the UK-based private equity firm, as a Senior Advisor in early 2009, to support their investments across the retail and consumer industries and to Chair one of their portfolio's brands – Agent Provocateur. Winser helped successfully reposition the chain as a luxury brand, supporting their global expansion into new markets by which the company's underlying profits almost tripled.

During this same period, she also served as an advisor to the global digital e-commerce business, Net-a-Porter, overseeing their expansion into new markets across Europe, Asia and the Middle East.

== Winser London ==
In 2013, Kim Winser launched her womenswear line, Winser London. Fronted by supermodel Yasmin Le Bon, the first collection launched on 15 February 2013 with a concession pop-up at Harvey Nichols, Knightsbridge. Recent guest collaborations include the actress Gillian Anderson and Cat Deeley, the TV personality, with exclusive capsule collections.

== Other accomplishments ==
Awarded an honorary doctorate by Heriot-Watt University in 2002 for her work with the British Textile Industry, Kim was bestowed an Order of the British Empire (OBE) by Her Majesty The Queen for services to the British fashion and retail industry in 2006.

Winser is an Independent Non-Executive Director of the luxury Peninsula Hotel and Property Group and works with HRH The Prince of Wales to support his youth enterprise, The Prince's Trust. Winser continues to act as a special advisor to a number of specific family funds on their investments.

Winser previously served as a non-executive director of The Edrington Group. By appointment of The Prime Minister, Winser also served as a trustee of the Natural History Museum.

Kim Winser was also selected to work alongside various industry executives in delivering the Good Work Commission for the British Government. Chaired by Alan Parker, Chairman of Brunswick, the report 'Good Work and our Times' published in 2011, explored the belief that 'good work' is of benefit to employees, employers and society alike - and how to make it more rewarding for all involved.

Winser became a contributor for Forbes in 2013. In 2014, Winser was included in the BBC's 100 Women; a multi-format annual series established in 2013, examining the role, issues and achievements of women in the 21st century.

Fortune Magazine and Management Today have previously both named Winser as one of the most powerful women in business.
