= Lewis Golden =

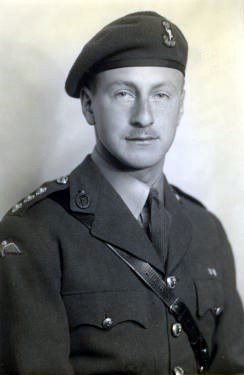
Captain Lewis Golden, 1944

Lewis Lawrence Golden OBE (6 December 1922 – 27 October 2017) was a British accountant, war veteran, and a founder of Everest Home Improvement. He was present at the Battle of Arnhem in 1944.

Born in Ealing, London, in December 1922, Golden volunteered for the British Army soon after his 18th birthday and was commissioned into the Royal Corps of Signals in March 1942. He was one of the first Royal Signals officers to qualify as a parachutist and joined the 1st Parachute Brigade Signal Section.

He served in the invasion of North Africa in November 1942, then in Tunisia and in the Allied invasion of Sicily in July 1943. In September that year, he served as signals officer of the 1st Airlanding Light Regiment of the Royal Artillery (1 ALR), which supported the 1st Canadian Infantry Division in southern Italy.

In September 1944, 1 ALR took part in Operation Market Garden, the battle of Arnhem. As divisional signals adjutant, Golden commanded a sector of the headquarters defences.

He was awarded the OBE in the 1978 Birthday Honours for services to the London Library. He made various significant charitable donations in retirement.
