= Cardigan (sweater) =

Type of knitted garment with an open front

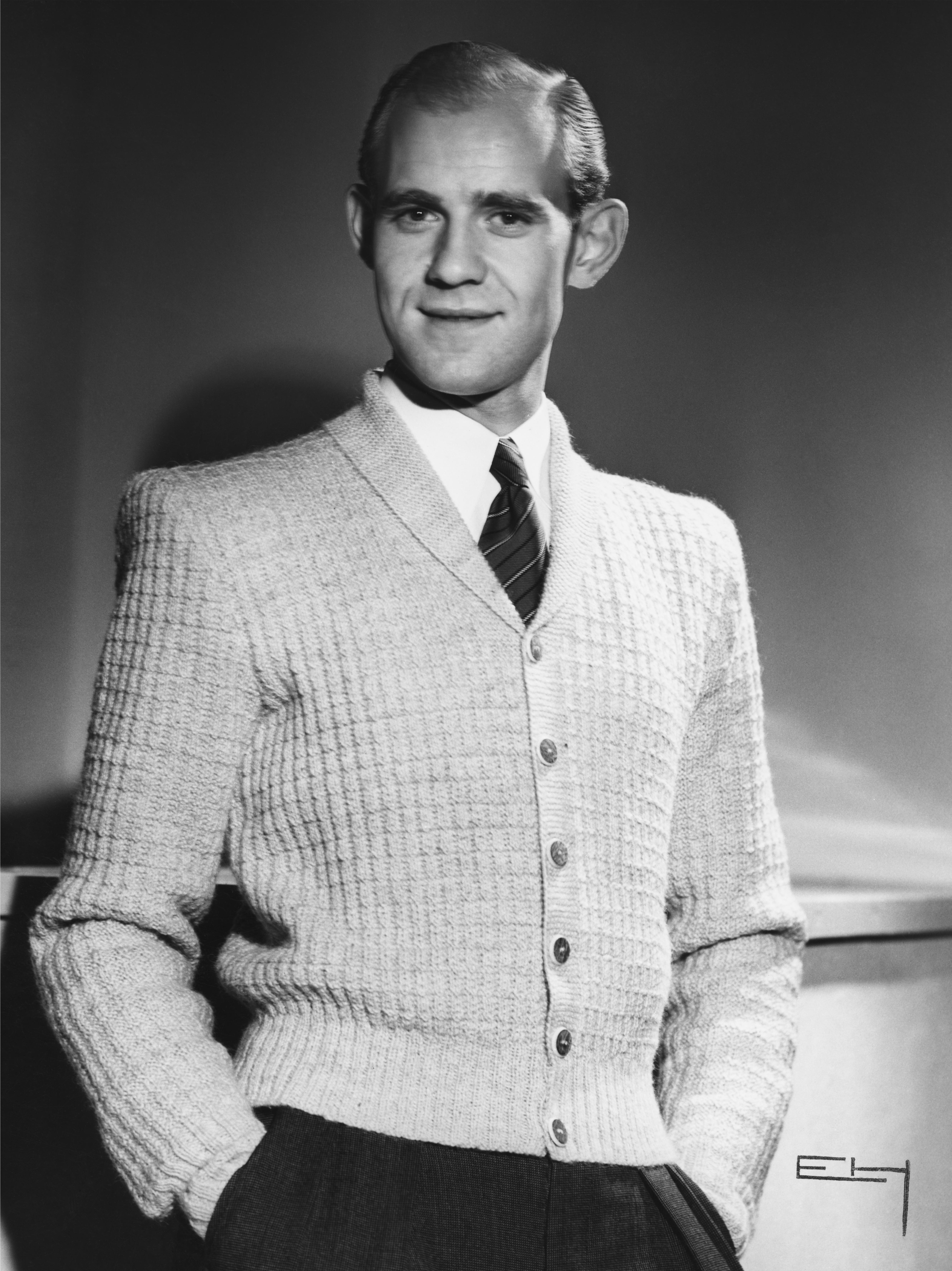
- Cardigan in fashion photo from 1947
- Type: Knitted garment
- Material: Many
- Manufacturer: Many

A cardigan is a type of knitted garment that has an open front and is worn like a jacket.

== Description ==
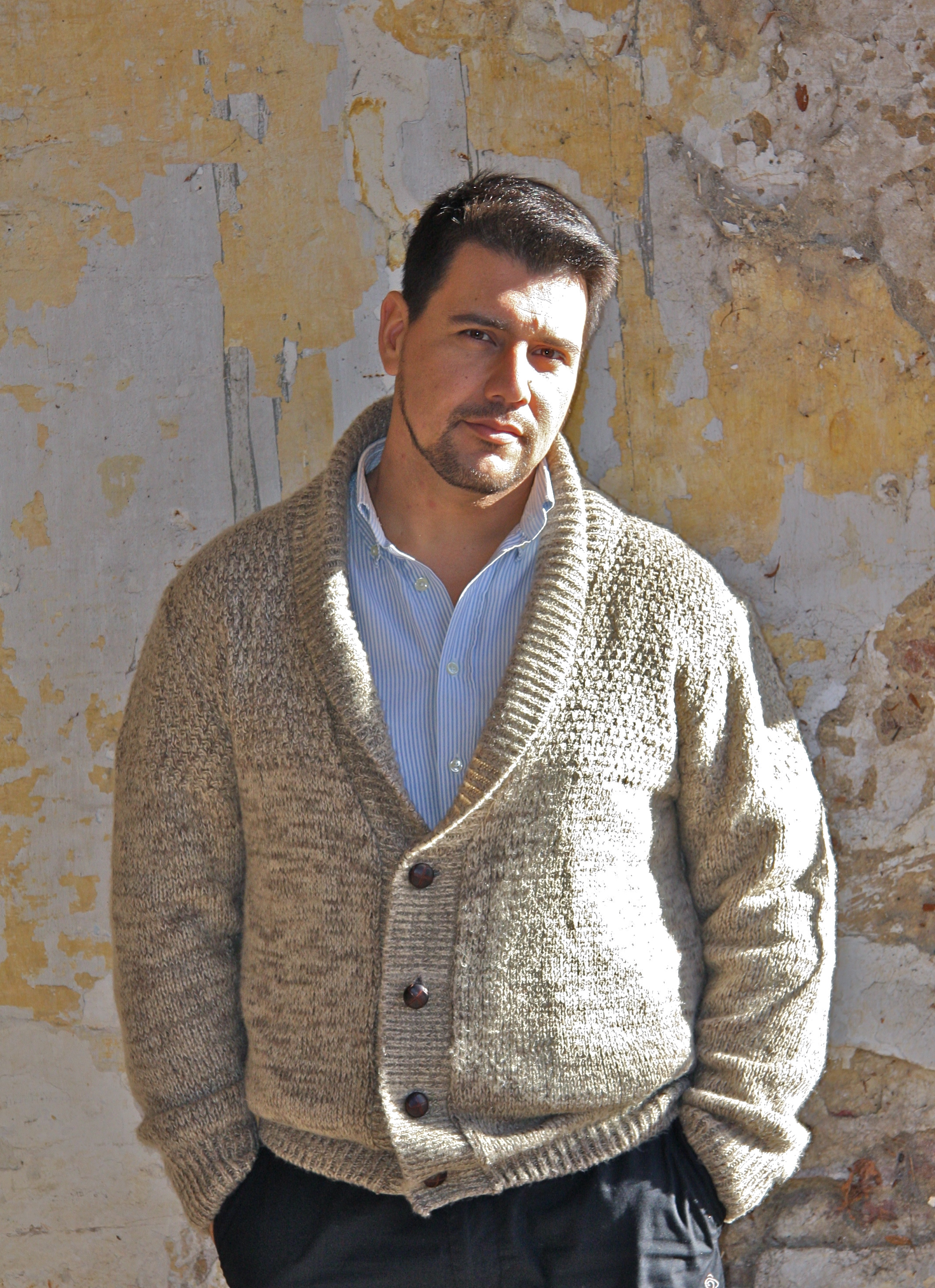
A baggy cardigan

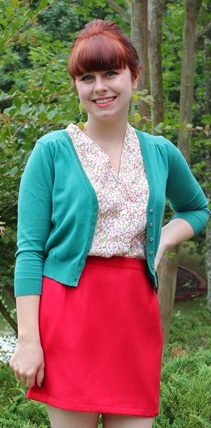
A tightly fitting cardigan with a blouse

Cardigans have open fronts, with or without buttons.They are usually knitted, but sometimes woven. A garment that ties in front is usually considered a robe. Knitted garments with zippers can also be referred to as cardigans. By contrast, a pullover does not open in front but is donned and doffed by "pulling over" the head. Cardigans may be machine- or hand-knitted. Traditionally, cardigans were made of wool but they may now be made of cotton, synthetic fibers, or any combination thereof. In British English, a baby's short cardigan is known as a matinee jacket.

== History ==
Two men wearing cardigans under jackets in the early 20th century

The cardigan was named after James Brudenell, 7th Earl of Cardigan, a British Army major general who led the Charge of the Light Brigade at the Battle of Balaclava during the Crimean War. It is modelled after the knitted wool waistcoat that British officers supposedly wore during the war. The legend of the event and the fame that Lord Cardigan achieved after the war led to the rise of the garment's popularity – supposedly, Brudenell invented the cardigan after noticing that the tails of his coat had accidentally been burnt off in a fireplace.

The term originally referred only to a knitted sleeveless vest, but later it expanded to include other types of garment. Coco Chanel is credited with popularizing cardigans for women because "she hated how tight-necked men's sweaters messed up her hair when she pulled them over her head." The garment is mostly associated with the college culture of the Roaring Twenties and early 1930s, being also popular throughout the 1950s, 1970s, 1990s, 2000s and into the early 2010s.

== Usage ==
Plain cardigans are often worn over shirts and inside suit jackets as a less formal version of the waistcoat or vest that restrains the necktie when the jacket has been removed. They are versatile and can be worn in casual or formal settings and in any season, but they are most often worn in cool weather.

The monochromatic cardigan, in sleeved or vest form, is a conservative fashion staple. As an item of formal clothing for any gender, it may be worn over a dress shirt. Less formally, it may be worn over a T-shirt.

Varsity letters for college and high school sports teams have been applied to cardigans and letterman jackets.

== See also ==
- Sweater design
- Twinset
- Raglan Sleeve
