= Belinda Earl =

British businesswoman

- Born: Belinda Jane Earl; 20 December 1961 (age 64); Plymouth, Devon, England
- Education: The University of Wales, Aberystwyth (BSc)
- Occupation: Merchandiser
- Years active: 1985 – present
- Title: Non Executive Director ( Woolworths Holdings Limited (RSA)
- Children: 2 (Ben Earl)

Belinda Jane Earl OBE (born 20 December 1961) is a British businesswoman, and a non-executive director of Woolworths Holdings Limited (RSA) in addition is a senior advisor to NewtonEurope as well as other retail advisory and mentor positions. She was style director of Marks and Spencer from 2012 to 2019. In 2003, she became the youngest FTSE 500 retail chief executive.

== Biography ==
Earl was born in Plymouth, Devon, and attended St Dunstan's Abbey School for Girls. She started working as a Saturday assistant in the menswear department of her local Debenhams at the age of 16, and managed a gift shop. Following sixth form studies, she studied economics and business at The University of Wales, Aberystwyth. After graduating in 1983 she started as a graduate trainee at Harrods, and was then appointed to a management position in its fashion division.

== Chief executive/director ==
=== Debenhams ===
In 1985, she left Harrods to become a menswear merchandiser at Debenhams. She rose to become a company director in 1991. She was appointed trading director and joined the board in 1997. She held responsibilities including womenswear, accessories, lingerie, and designers. After Terry Green resigned in 2000, she was appointed CEO of Debenhams. During her administration the company did well despite an unfavourable economic climate. She became the first chief executive of a London Stock Exchange-listed company to take maternity leave with the birth of her second son in 2001. Her planned six weeks' absence made headlines of some national newspapers as a relatively long time for a chief executive to take off work. She was re-elected at annual general meetings up to and including 2003.

She left Debenhams in 2003. Her failure that October to secure a buyout of Debenhams by Permira prompted her departure (Debenhams was eventually bought for £1.7 billion by a rival private consortium).

=== Jaeger ===
Harold Tillman, a retail entrepreneur, had bought Jaeger in 2002 and had inherited a brand in decline. Earl was initially approached in 2004 and was eventually persuaded to become CEO. Jaeger became a profitable business, growing sales both in retail and online, developed the lines of Jaeger London, Boutique by Jaeger and Jaeger Black as well as expanding internationally during her tenure. She left the business in 2011.

=== Marks and Spencer ===
Earl joined Marks and Spencer as style director in September 2012.

She was appointed Officer of the Order of the British Empire (OBE) in the 2017 Birthday Honours for services to retail.

== Educational commitments ==
Earl is a patron of Skillsmart, a retail sector skills council, a fellow of the City & Guilds Institute, and a fellow of the University of Wales.
