= Sheila Jones Harms =

Singer

Sheila Harms (29 May 1931 – 12 December 2004) was a soprano in Germany and Austria. She specialized in the vocal interpretation of lieder, oratorio, and opera, which she combined with her musicianship at the piano.

== Biography ==
Born in Carlisle, England, near the border with Scotland, Sheila attended the Royal College of Music in London, where she majored in both piano and voice, studying under Dr. Arnold Smith and Dr. Thomas P. Fielden. Dr. Smith had won acclaim as the accompanist for Manuel Garcia, the inventor of the laryngoscope, and teacher of Jenny Lind, Mathilde Marchesi and Julius Stockhausen, among others, while Dr. Fielden had studied with Claude Debussy.

Upon graduating from the Royal College of Music, Sheila won the Dame Clara Butt Award for being the best soprano of her year. This award took her to Vienna, Austria, during the Allied occupation of that city after World War II, where she attended the Vienna Academy of Music and Dramatic Art, receiving her Performer's Diplomas in Lieder, Oratorio, and Opera. Sheila won practically every scholarship Great Britain had to offer, including a Sir James Caird Scholarship for three years in succession. During her stay in Vienna, she met and married her husband, baritone Werner Harms, who was in Austria on a Fulbright scholarship, and who had previously studied at the Academy of Vocal Arts in Philadelphia.

Sheila also taught in four languages at the Mozarteum Summer Academy in Salzburg, made recordings, broadcast many times on Austrian radio and television, and won acclaim as a Lieder and Opera singer in Austria, Germany, the United States, and Canada. Among her many operatic roles was that of Konstanze in Mozart's Die Entführung aus dem Serail which she sang over 40 times, on several occasions with noted Italian tenor Giuseppe Di Stefano.

In the United States, Sheila was leading soprano soloist for the University of Chicago's Rockefeller Chapel Choir, and concurrently taught voice and headed the Voice Department at the Music Center of the North Shore in Chicago.

In 1979, Sheila and Werner Harms were invited to assist with the summer program of the American Institute of Musical Studies (AIMS) in Graz, Austria, providing opportunities and contacts for American opera singers in Europe. To further their work with AIMS, Sheila and Werner moved from Chicago to Dallas to help oversee the American operations of AIMS.

Sheila Jones Harms strongly believed in helping promising future opera singers and musicians to achieve their career goals. With this in mind, Sheila and Werner founded the International Opera Studio of Dallas (IOSD) in 1984. Many of her students are now performing in major opera houses in the United States and Europe, both as leading soloists and as chorus members, including Dallas Opera, and have won awards such as the Metropolitan Opera Regional Competition and the MacAllister and William Matheus Sullivan awards. Over the years, more than 30 of her students have sung as chorus members with Dallas Opera. For many years, the Harms organized and performed in many concerts in the Dallas area, including frequent performances for the Wagner Society of Dallas, the Dallas Goethe Center, the Musical Arts Society of Dallas, and Dallas Pro Musica.

In a letter to Sheila, Maestro Nicola Rescigno, former artistic director of the Dallas Opera, wrote: "It was so nice to hear you on this side of the piano Saturday. You brought great musicality and sensitivity to everything you sang. I feel sure that if you can impart even a small amount of what you showed to your students, they are in very capable hands. I know how conscientious you are with your pupils in their preparation, and all I can say is that I wish there were more like you.”

Sheila Jones Harms often performed and taught at university and music schools in the area, where she explained her theories about vocal interpretation and accompanying, and provided teaching demonstrations. At the time of her death, she was involved in a project to write a memoir and book on voice training, entitled “Remember the Eye Smile or The Secrets of a Good Vocal Technique.”

== Sources ==
- Edward P. Flaspoehler, Jr.: The Cold War Soprano. Memoirs of a Singer-Spy. Dallas TX: Prestige Services, 2006
