= Fairline Yachts =

British motor yacht manufacturer

Fairline Yachts Ltd.
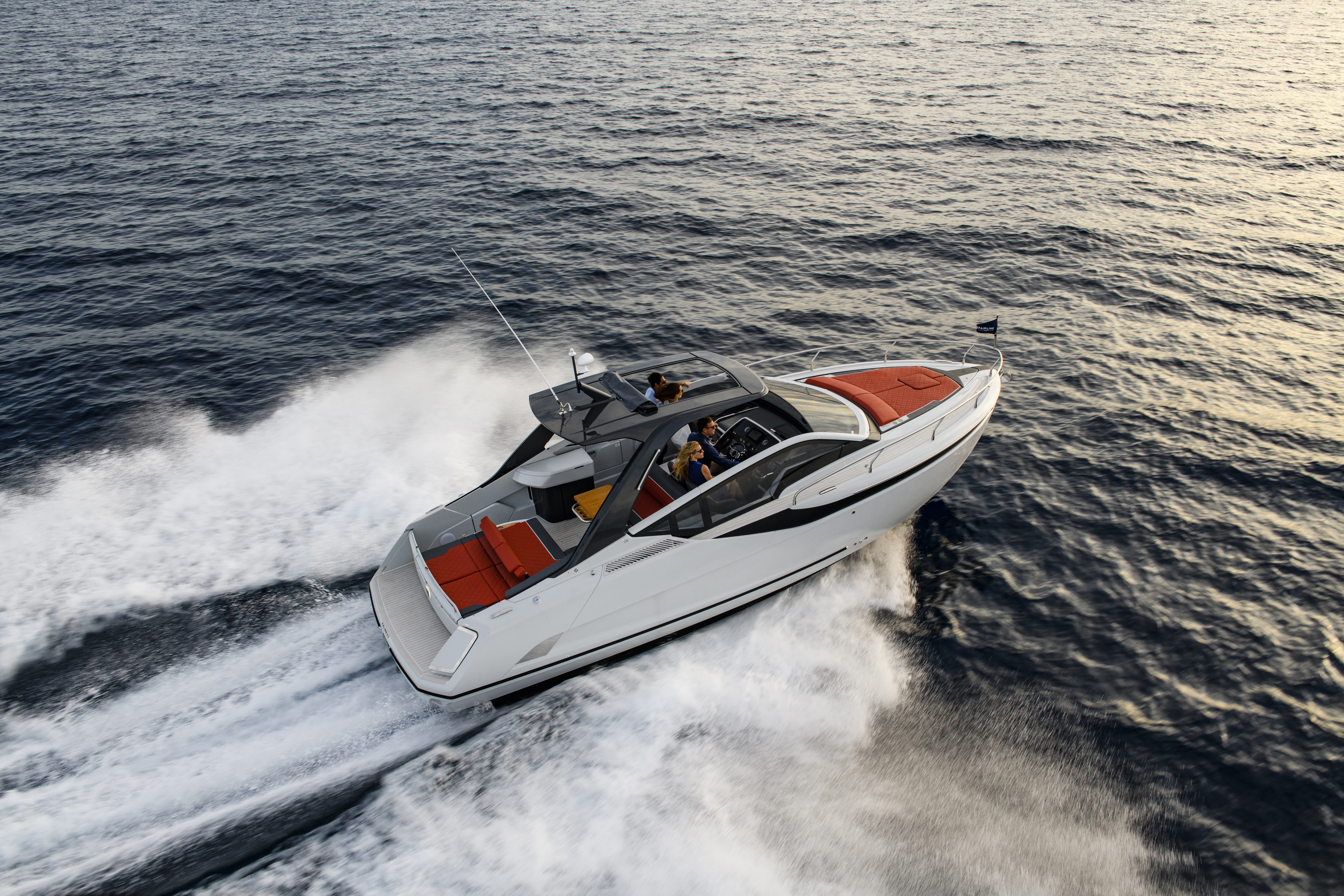
- Predecessor: Fairline Boats
- Founder: Jack Newington
- Headquarters: Oundle, United Kingdom
- Parent: Hanover Investors, UK

Fairline Yachts is a British manufacturer of luxury motor yachts. Started in 1963 by Jack Newington, the company builds motor yachts in Oundle, Northamptonshire. Hanover Investors, a UK based private equity company owns the brand.

== Range ==
Fairline Yachts's range includes the following models:

- Squadron – first launched in 1990 with the Squadron 62, a large yacht range. From 42 feet (13 metres) to 78 ft (24 m)
- Targa – first launched in 1985, a series of sports style boats. From 38 ft (12 m) to 62 ft (19 m), the range is topped by the Gran Turismo models, first launched in 2003
- F//LINE – First launched in, 2019, a 33 ft (10 m) dayboat, inspired by the look of classic cars from the 1960s
- Phantom – First launched in 2022, a 65 ft (19.96 m) yacht, inspired by the design of the Targa 65

== History ==
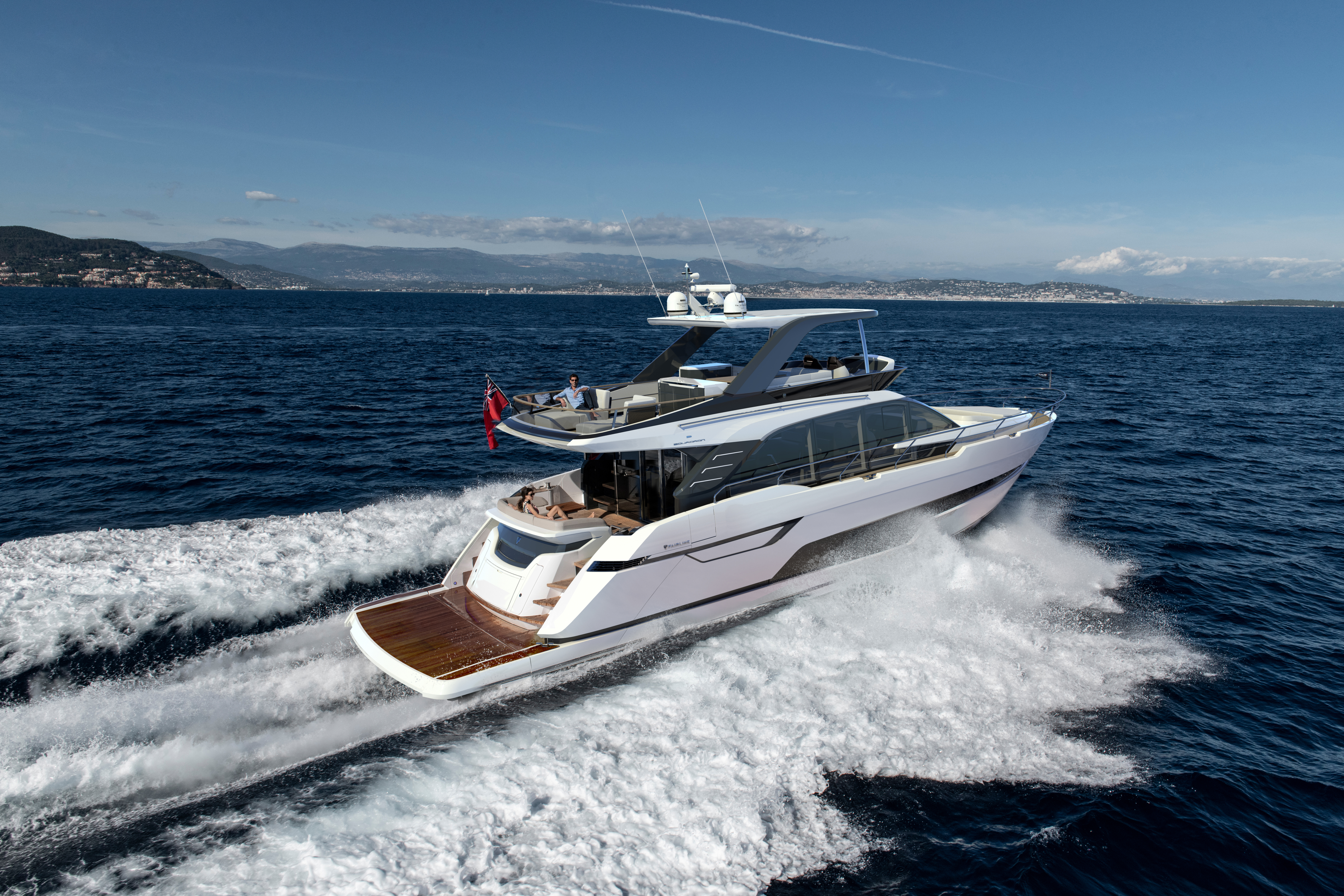
Fairline Yachts Squadron 68

=== Newington family ===
The company started when Newington bought a series of gravel pits on the River Nene and built the Oundle Marina. In 1967 he launched the first Fairline boat, a 19 feet (5.8 m) handcrafted glass-reinforced plastic river cruiser. When Newington's son Sam, a former Royal Air Force pilot and Columbia University MBA graduate, took over in 1971, the company employed fourteen people. Sam expanded the company's sales network overseas to take advantage of the expanding Mediterranean market place – by 1979 the company employed 140 people and turned over £5 million, with production expanded by the success of 1977's Fairline 40 model.

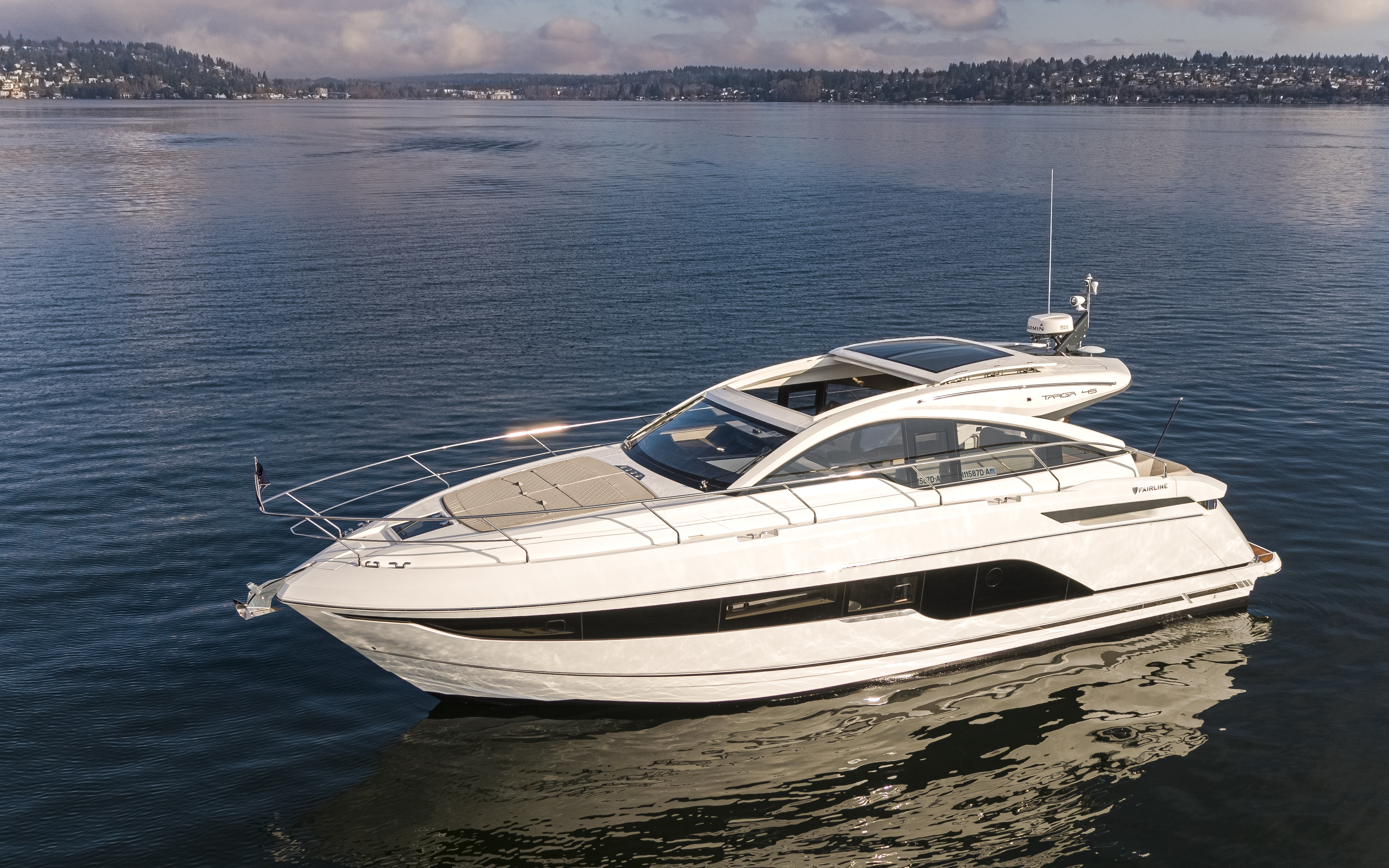
Fairline Yachts Targa 45 GT

The company expanded in the 1980s developing lines of high speed cruising yachts. In 1986, Fairline was awarded the Queen's Award for Enterprise: International Trade. When Sam retired in 1996, the company expanded further by establishing Fairline Boats of North America Inc., creating a network of 35 dealers. In 2002 the 10,000th Fairline was completed, together with new production facilities at the original Oundle site. By 2010, the 12,000th Fairline was completed, a Squadron 55 shipped to a client in Italy. The Fairline Owners Club was founded in 2003. On 20 June 2017 it was announced that Sam Newington had died peacefully at home at the age of 82.

=== Venture investment: 2006–2015 ===
In 2006 the company was purchased by 3i. The company launched the Fairline Targa 38 in 2006, which won the European Powerboat of the Year in the 30 ft (9.1 m) to 40 ft (12 m) category in 2007. Fairline Boats was purchased by Better Capital and RBS in July 2011. On 29 September 2015, Fairline Boats was bought by Wessex Bristol owned by Ayiaz Ahmed.

=== Administration ===
Having suffered a series of trading difficulties since the 2008 global recession, in December 2015 Fairline Boats entered administration. In January 2016, Alexander Volov and Igor Glyanenko, UK-based Russian businessmen, purchased the assets of Fairline Boats and formed Fairline Yachts Ltd. They announced a reduction in the workforce from the previous 466 to "around 100".

=== Fairline Yachts Ltd ===
Since 2016, the reorganized Fairline Yachts has announced a series of new models of both its Squadron and Targa lines, as well as the introduction of the dayboat series, F//LINE and Phantom.

In 2020, RiverRock European Opportunities Fund II announced it had purchased a majority stake in the company.

In 2021, the private equity firm Hanover Investors acquired Fairline Yachts Ltd.

In December 2024 Hanover Investors sold their stake in Fairline Yachts to Arrowbolt Propulsion Systems which was formed two days prior to the sale.

== See also ==
- Princess Yachts
- Sunseeker International
