= Henry Potts (sportsman) =

English cricketer (1925–2011)

Personal information
- Full name: Henry James Potts
- Born: 23 January 1925; Carlisle, Cumberland, England
- Died: 23 April 2011 (aged 86); Narrabeen, Sydney, Australia
- Batting: Right-handed

Domestic team information
- Years: Team
- 1949–1950: Oxford University

Career statistics
Competition	First-class
Matches	9
Runs scored	290
Batting average	22.30
100s/50s	0/1
Top score	50
Catches/stumpings	6/–
- Source: Cricinfo, 19 March 2020

Henry James Potts (23 January 1925 – 23 April 2011) was an English first-class cricketer and footballer.

== Biography ==
Potts was born at Carlisle in January 1925. After attending Stand Grammar School in Manchester he went up to Keble College, Oxford.

While studying at Oxford, Potts played first-class cricket for Oxford University in 1949 and 1950, making nine appearances. He made his highest score of 50 batting at No. 7 in Oxford's victory over Leicestershire in 1950. In Oxford's victory over Middlesex in 1949 he opened the batting, scoring 47 and 49 in first-wicket partnerships of 90 and 104 with Murray Hofmeyr.

Potts was also an association football winger, appearing for Oxford University and gaining a blue. After he graduated from Oxford he played for Pegasus in the final of the 1950–51 FA Amateur Cup against Bishop Auckland at Wembley, which Pegasus won 2–1. He signed for Northampton Town in August 1950, making ten appearances for the club. Potts also played for the England amateur team, gaining eight caps.

Potts died in the Narrabeen suburb of Sydney on 23 April 2011, at the age of 86.
