= Everest Home Improvement =

British home improvement company

Everest 2020 Limited
- Company type: Private
- Industry: Home improvement
- Founded: June 2020
- Headquarters: Welwyn Garden City, Hertfordshire, England
- Key people: Paula Chambers (CEO)
- Services: double glazing, home improvement
- Owner: Better Capital LLP
- Number of employees: 1000
- Website: www.everest.co.uk

Everest Home Improvement was a British double glazing and home improvement company. The company was founded in 1964 but went into administration in June 2020. A new company called Everest 2020 limited was formed in June 2020 following the administration. In April 2024, Everest 2000 Limited was put into administration.

== History ==
Everest was founded by Lewis Golden in 1964. It became one of the first companies in the market of double glazing. In what became a very fragmented market, with over 3,000 companies, the company grew to become the second biggest in the UK market by sales and turnover with 2.5% of the market (£165m sales) by 2009, later rising to 3%.

Private Equity firm Better Capital acquired the company in March 2012 for £25 million. In November 2013, the company won the Interactive Media Awards in content, design, functionality, high standards of compliance and usability.

In 2014, Everest windows introduced triple glazing to the volume market.

Everest Windows were awarded Sales Team of the Year runner up and Sales Director of the Year runner up at the British Excellence in Sales & Marketing Awards in March 2015.

=== Administration ===
On 6 June 2020, Everest Limited was put into administration by its owner, Better Capital. It then created a new company called Everest 2020 and bought up the operations and order book. The new company owned by the previous owners of Everest chose not honour the warranties of previous customers. The BBC Watchdog programme said "the new company was using the same or very similar branding and claiming that they have been making quality products since 1965, but despite promoting the old company’s heritage, it was not looking after all of its customers."

On 24 April 2024, Everest 2000 Limited was itself put into administration, putting 350 jobs at risk, and appointed administrators from ReSolve Advisory Limited.

== Products ==
The company manufactured doors, windows (double glazed & triple glazed) and a variety of home exterior structures.

== Organisation ==
The company was headquartered in Cuffley, Hertfordshire, and had manufacturing plants in Sittingbourne, Kent and Treherbert, Wales, and employed its own product development team, design team, installation team and sales team. The company employed over 1,000 sales people in 2009, each operating as a franchisee. They were not employed by Everest. they were self-employed.

During 2013, employing over 2,000 staff, the total operating profits for 2012-2013 were over £5.1 million.

== Advertising ==
=== Tan Hill Inn ===
Everest's slogan "Fit the best. Everest," written by advertising executive Rod Allen, was made memorable by the company's first television advert in the 1980s. Filmed in 'Britain's highest pub' the Tan Hill Inn in Tan Hill, North Yorkshire, it attempted to showcase the draught-proofing of Everest double glazing by having television personality Ted Moult dropping a feather on one side of the pubs double-glazed windows, while a gale raged outside. A new version of the advert featuring Craig Doyle, was produced in 2008. It created some controversy after local planning officials recognized that Everest had not properly authorized the improvement work done to the filming location, as is required for commercial premises.

=== Advertising bans ===
In 2008, the Advertising Standards Authority (ASA) banned an Everest Windows television advertisement for potentially misleading consumers as to the amount of hot water generated by a solar panel. The advert was subsequently amended and allowed to be shown in the amended form.

In 2011, the ASA banned an Everest advert for solar panels, following claims of misleading consumers regarding potential cost savings.

== Which? Investigations ==
A report in April 2010 by consumer organisation Which? claimed that of 14 companies it investigated selling double glazing on the doorstep, most were employing "cowboy" sales tactics.
