= Stuart Stockdale =

English fashion designer

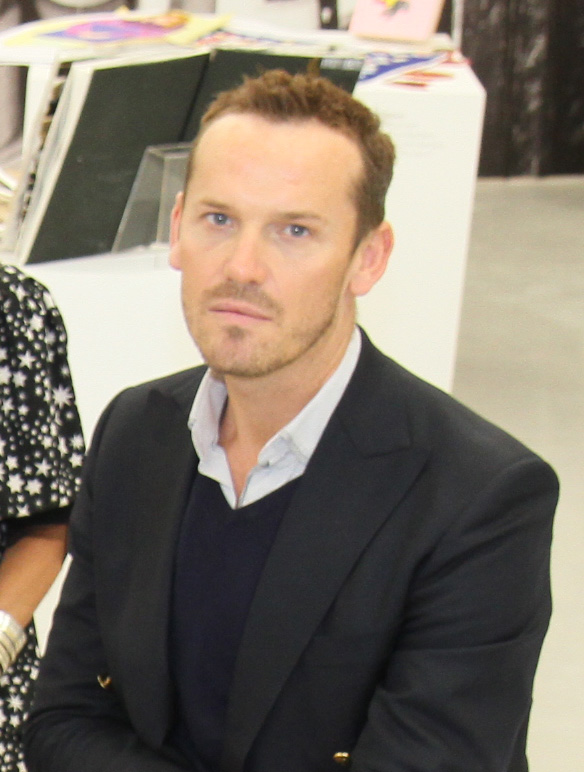
- British fashion designer Stuart Stockdale in London, July 2011
- Born: Carlisle, Cumbria
- Occupation: Fashion designer
- Known for: Design Director at Pringle of Scotland (2001–2005) and Jaeger (2008–2012)

Stuart Stockdale is an English fashion designer, born in Carlisle, Cumbria. He has lived and worked around the world and he currently lives in London and Paris.

== Education ==
Stuart studied fashion design at Central Saint Martins College of Art and Design and went on to do a Master's degree at the Royal College of Art.

== Biography ==
He has worked in all major fashion capitals for designers such as Jasper Conran, Romeo Gigli, J Crew, Pringle of Scotland, Jigsaw and Jean Paul Gaultier.

From 2001 to 2005 he was the design director at Pringle of Scotland. He is widely attributed with revitalising the company worldwide and making the brand "sexy" again. He left the company in 2005 to take up a position as design director of the luxury British tie brand, Holliday and Brown, and contributed to their collaborations with Prada.

After working for French haute couture designer, Jean Paul Gaultier, where he was responsible for creating the pret a porter collection and worked on various special projects such as costumes for Kylie Minogue's tour, he returned to London to take up a position as design director of Jaeger where he was responsible for the creative direction of the entire brand. At Jaeger he designed the uniforms for the staff at Kensington Palace.
