= City Link (company) =

British next day courier company

City Link Transport Holdings Limited
- Type: Limited company
- Industry: Courier
- Founded: 1969
- Defunct: 1 January 2015
- Fate: Administration
- Headquarters: Coventry, England
- Key people: David Smith (Managing Director); Robert Peto (Finance Director)
- Products: Freight Forwarding Services; Logistics Services
- Revenue: ▼£306.9 million GBP(FY 2011)
- Owner: Better Capital
- Number of employees: 2,727
- Website: web.archive.org/web/20140301143242/http://www.city-link.co.uk:80/ (Archive copy)

City Link was a British next day courier company, operating from 1969 to 2015. It was based in Coventry, West Midlands with offices in other parts of the country. On 24 December 2014, the company entered administration. Ernst & Young (EY) was appointed as the administrator, and immediately ceased accepting parcels from customers. City Link officially ceased trading on 1 January 2015.

== History ==
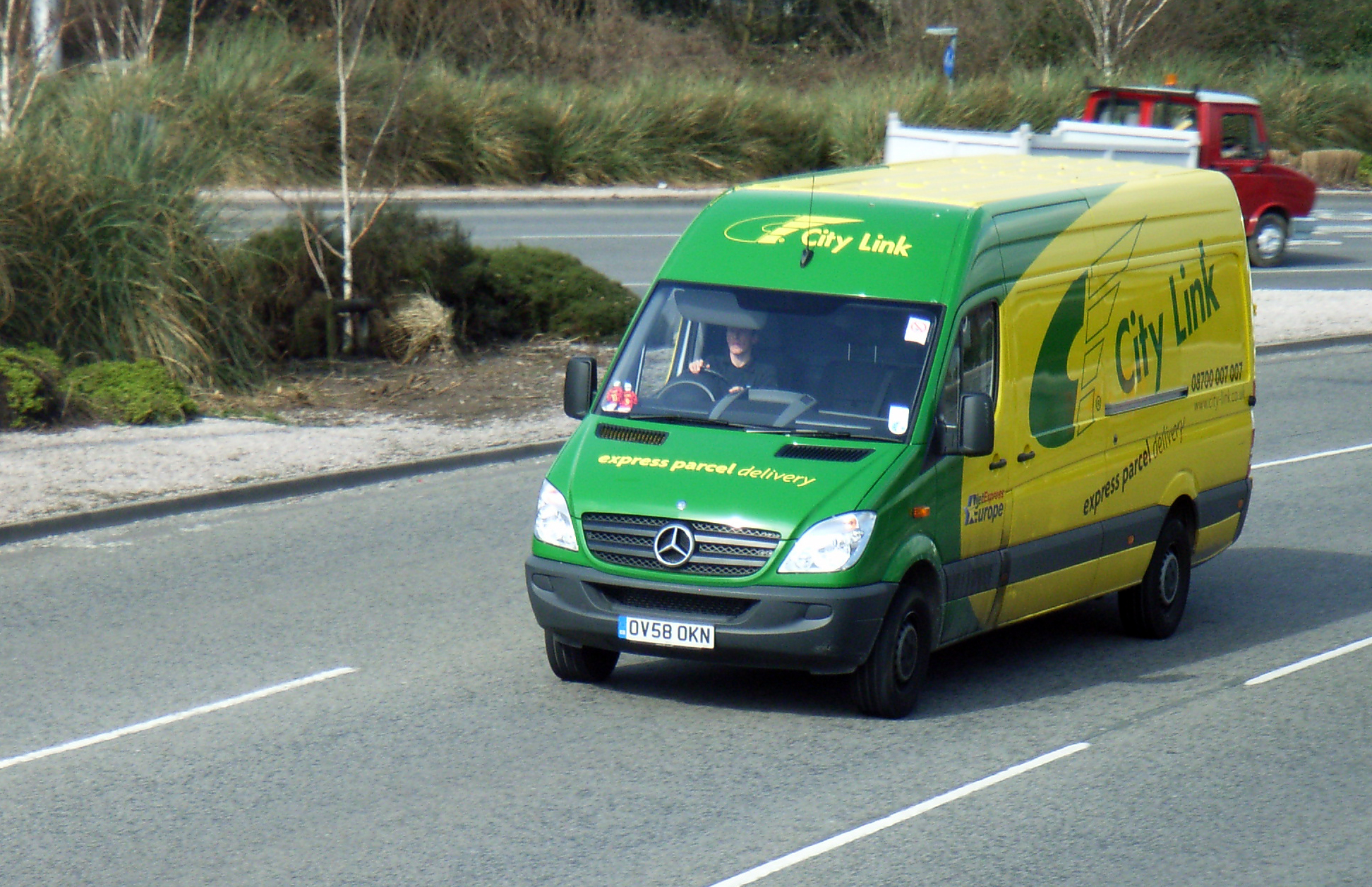
Mercedes-Benz Sprinter in Plymouth in March 2009

City Link was founded in 1969 by two minicab drivers, Harry Hammond-Seaman and Jo Burt, as a subsidiary of Orbit Cargo Services Ltd, to provide a cross-town transfer service for British Rail's Red Star Parcels. At the time, Red Star only operated on direct passenger trains, so a sender in Brighton could not dispatch a parcel to Norwich, as a transfer had to be undertaken in London between Victoria Station and Liverpool Street station.

In addition, the Red Star service was limited to station-to-station only. Following increasing demand from its customers, City Link established a nationwide network of delivery agents to collect parcels from the local station and deliver them to the consignee.

With one depot and three employees, the company had a growing customer base, turning over £100 thousand per year. Yet by 1971, profits were derisory, and resultant cash-flow difficulties meant that Orbit Cargo decided to sell the business. The new owner, Bob Thomas, snapped up 75% of the company for £75 and became managing director, a position he occupied for the next 20 years. To gain greater market share, Thomas successfully introduced the franchise concept (the first to do so in the UK parcels sector) by encouraging delivery agents to become franchisees and solicit new business from companies in their areas.

A significant increase in sales led to further cash-flow difficulties, and by June 1989, Thomas had agreed to sell the company to Securiguard Group plc. Being a member of a publicly limited company posed several cultural changes, yet the new owners largely left City Link to generate profits. By 1990, sales had reached £32 million, with a network of 36 depots and over 600 employees.

In July 1993, it was announced that Rentokil plc had successfully made a hostile bid for Securiguard for £76 million, now City Link’s fourth owner since its conception. Unlike Securiguard, Rentokil was uncomfortable with owning a network primarily consisting of franchisees. Whilst they benefitted from profits emanating from City Link, they also coveted the income that the franchisees were generating and were determined to find methods of attaining it for themselves. Keen to attain greater market share and hoping to emulate DHL (part of Deutsche Post AG), Rentokil directors went on the acquisition trail.

On 20 November 2005, Rentokil Initial announced that as a part of its expansion programme, it would buy back the City Link franchises. This was completed in March 2007. In addition, Target Express was identified as an appropriate addition to merge with City Link. The acquisition, coupled with the franchisee buy-back was to become a catastrophe for both businesses.

=== Acquisition of Target Express ===
Exactly one year after Rentokil Initial announced its City Link franchise buyback scheme, it finished negotiations with the shareholders of Target Express to purchase the company on 20 November 2006. Target was officially acquired, and taken over by City Link on 1 March 2007.

As a part of its merger with Target Express, City Link was planning to close 42 of the 110 combined branches in the first half of 2008, to provide a single integrated network. However, at the end of February 2008, managing director Petar Cvetkovic announced a suspension of further integration of Target Express depots until January 2009.

The merger of the two units proved problematic, particularly due to depots running different computer systems, damaging profits at parent company Rentokil Initial. Rentokil Initial turned down several offers for the loss making unit in May 2008, instead intending to turn around City Link's fortunes.

By November 2011, City Link was still losing money, annual figures released in July show losses growing to £17.8 million, and revenues down 13.5%, and a November 2011 trading statement stated losses of £25 million in the first nine months. Rentokil Initial sold the business to corporate restructuring firm Better Capital in April 2013.

=== Administration ===
Late on 24 December 2014, City Link went into administration, and stopped accepting parcels, whilst its administrators Ernst & Young carried out an assessment of the company.

On 25 December 2014, the RMT union was reported to have demanded "urgent talks" with the government and administrators about the collapse of the company. The government said it was unable to intervene in the administration process, although the business secretary said he would meet the union. RMT demanded government talks over the collapse.

On 31 December, the company announced that 2,356 jobs would be lost, leaving only 370 staff employed. The collapse of City Link also left 1,500 self employed drivers out of pocket, with no recourse or protection. A petition was created by the sub contractors to try to get the collapse of City Link debated in the House of Commons.

=== Rescue offer rejected ===
BBC News reported on 31 December 2014 that the administrators had rejected an offer from an unnamed consortium, claiming that the possible buyer "offered no money up front and significantly undervalued the assets to be acquired". After confirmation that the rescue had failed, Mick Cash, general secretary of the RMT union, said: "Pulling the plug on any efforts to save City Link is a disgraceful and cynical betrayal that will wreck the lives of our members, many of whom are owed thousands of pounds".

=== Reports ===
The Telegraph website reported on 21 March 2015 that "City Link’s creditors are likely to see less than 2p in the pound on any money they are owed". MPs were expected to publish a report on the impact of City Link's closure on employment on 23 March 2015.
