= Better Capital =

Better Capital is a British Private equity firm founded by Jon Moulton in 2009.

== Investments ==
Better Capital has had investments in the following companies:

- In February 2010, Better Capital acquired Gardner Group from The Carlyle Group
- In April 2010, Better Capital acquired Reader's Digest UK from administrators Moore Stephens, backing a management buyout
- In July 2011, Better Capital acquired a majority stake of Fairline Yachts in a joint venture with Royal Bank of Scotland
- In April 2012, Better Capital acquired fashion chain Jaeger (entered administration in April 2017)
- In April 2013, Better Capital acquired City Link from Rentokil Initial (in administration, December 2014)
- In September 2015, Better Capital sold Fairline Yachts to Wessex Bristol
- In 2012, Better Capital acquired Everest, and in 2020 re-acquired the operations of the company in a pre-pack administration deal.

In 2020, the firm delisted from the stock market after their investee companies suffered huge disruption to their businesses during the COVID-19 pandemic.

== Former Investments ==
- Northern Aerospace Limited
