= Twinset =

Cardigan sweater with matching short sleeve pullover or shell

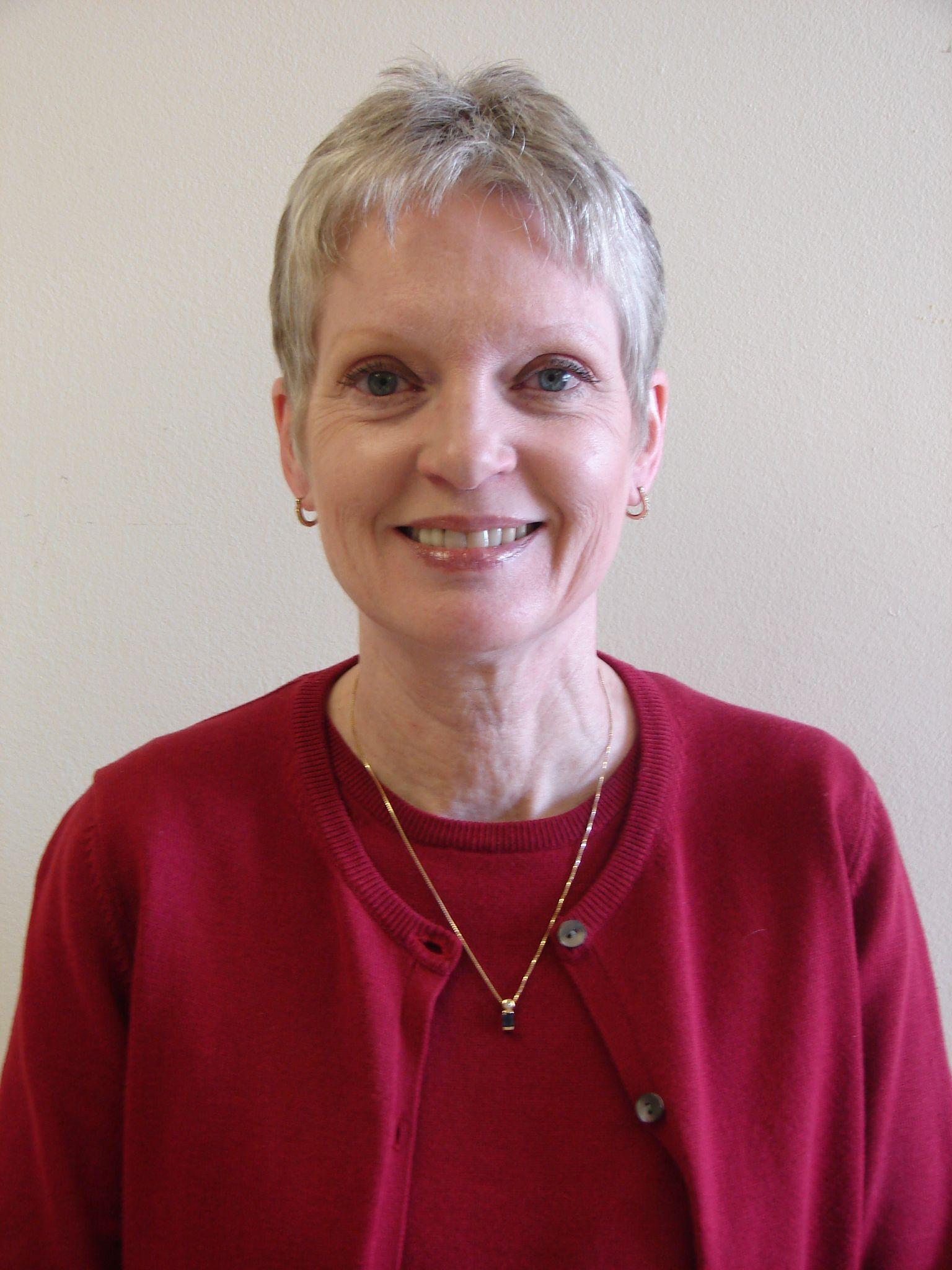
Woman wearing a twinset

A twinset, twin set or sweater-set is a matching set of a cardigan and a (usually) short-sleeved jumper or pullover. The twinset first appeared in the early 1930s and is still common in western women's attire.

== Description ==
The classic twinset is knitted in wool or cashmere, though modern interpretations can be knit from synthetics such as acrylic. The under-sweater is usually worn tight-fitting, with the cardigan unbuttoned to reveal accompanying jewelry, most typically a string of pearls.

Twinsets have been associated most closely with women's work wardrobes during the 1950s and 1960s, particularly in secretarial work or teaching, but were occasionally viewed as too casual for more conservative workplaces where dress suits were preferred. However, their popularity was largely driven by Hollywood stars such as Grace Kelly, Marilyn Monroe, and Audrey Hepburn who were frequently seen wearing them on and off the set.

The twinset is often chosen by costume directors and designers in the modern film industry to portray a character's conservatism or frumpiness. The style has been associated with a stereotypical librarian. On the other hand, interest in the twinset returned thanks in part to the pink set worn by Elizabeth Hurley in the 1997 film Austin Powers: International Man of Mystery.

The twinset, in a variety of lengths and sleeve styles (set-in or raglan, short- and long-sleeved for both cardigan and pullover), has remained commercially available to the present day through numerous design houses, manufacturers and retailers. Its current appeal is to older women and to "retro"-styled younger women drawing from 1950s and 1960s-inspired influences such as the AMC drama Mad Men.

== History ==
The twinset was a 1930s fashion innovation, credited to knitwear designer Otto Weisz who invented the matching cardigan and top for fashion brand Pringle of Scotland.
