= Pringle of Scotland =

Luxury fashion brand based in Edinburgh

Pringle of Scotland Limited
- Current logo

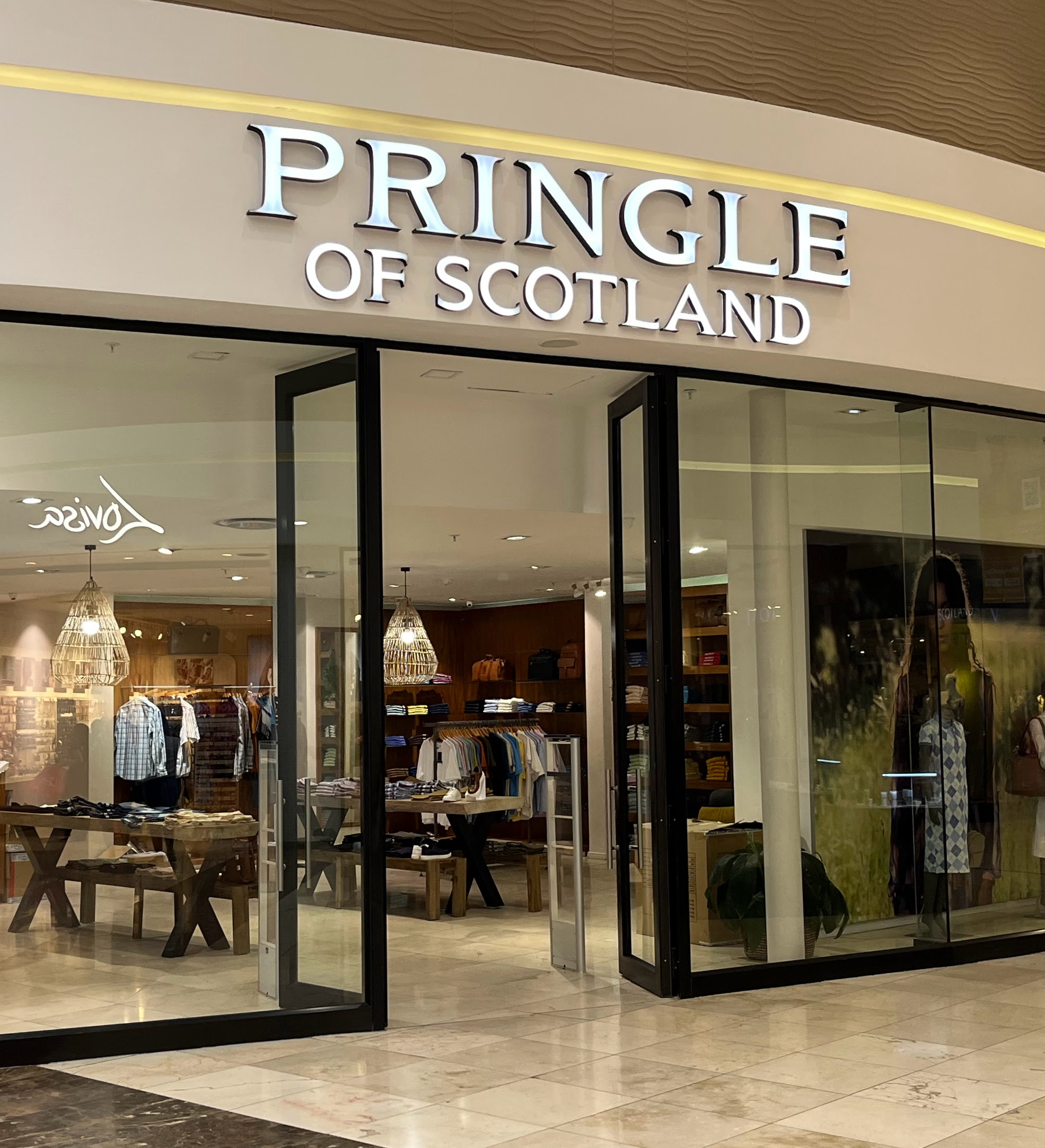
- Trade name: Pringle of Scotland
- Industry: Fashion
- Founded: 1815; 211 years ago
- Founder: Robert Pringle
- Headquarters: Hawick, Roxburghshire, Scotland
- Key people: Otto Weisz
- Owner: S.C. Fang & Sons Company, Ltd
- Website: www.pringlescotland.com

Pringle of Scotland Limited, trading as Pringle of Scotland, is a Scottish luxury fashion brand specialising in cashmere knitwear based in Hawick, Scotland.

It is one of the world's oldest continually operating fashion companies and once held the royal warrant as manufacturers of knitted garments. The company has its flagship stores in London's Mount Street, Edinburgh's George Street, Shanghai, and Beijing, and is sold by retailers in 20 countries.

== History ==
=== Formation ===
Robert Pringle established Pringle of Scotland in 1815 in the Scottish Borders. Initially the company produced hosiery and underwear, and have been producing cashmere since 1870. Otto Weisz was appointed as the first full-time designer in the knitwear industry in 1934. The twinset and the ancient-Scottish Argyle adapted pattern were designed under Weisz's direction, which became popular with Jean Simmons, Brigitte Bardot and Grace Kelly.

=== Dawson International Plc ===
In 1967, Pringle of Scotland was acquired by Joseph Dawson (Holdings) Limited, who were later renamed Dawson International Plc. Throughout the 1980s and 1990s leisure and sportswear played a key role within the Pringle of Scotland brand with top British golf players including Nick Faldo and Colin Montgomerie being sponsored by the group. During the early to mid-1980s that Pringle become a household name on the football terraces and still holds a nostalgic place in the heart of the casual movement.

In 2000, the brand which was losing around £4.5m per annum was bought for £6m by Hong Kong–based S.C. Fang & Sons Company, Ltd. Pringle has a design studio in London, England.

=== Management changes ===
In the new millennium, under the leadership of newly appointed chief executive Kim Winser formerly of Marks & Spencer, and Stuart Stockdale the company exhibited at London Fashion Week with new designs based on the company's trademark twinset and Argyle pattern.

In 2005, Winser and Stockdale left the company, and having so far invested over £35m Kenneth Fang handed over control to his children, Jean and Douglas Fang. By this stage sales had risen to almost £25m with losses running at around £8m due to the expansion.

After Clare Waight Keller was appointed the new Creative Director, 2007 saw the introduction of a luxury accessories range. In March 2011 ex-Balenciaga designer Alistair Carr was named as Design Director following the resignation of Keller but was ousted less than a year later do to stagnant sales and poor reception.

In 2012, Pringle of Scotland debuted a Japanese diffusion line, Pringle 1815, produced by Sanyo Shokai.

=== 2016–present ===
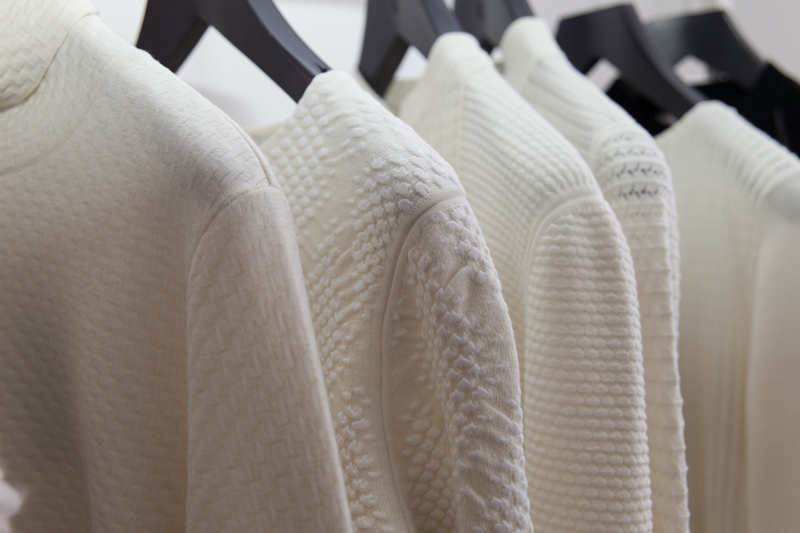
Pringle of Scotland - Autumn - Winter 2013 Collection

Fran Stringer was announced as the Womenswear Design Director in 2016 and Giuseppe Marretta joined as Menswear Design Director in 2019

In 2019 there were collaborations with H&M worldwide (Pringle of Scotland X H&M) and skater brand Palace (Pringle of Scotland X Palace). In 2020 Pringle of Scotland celebrated its 205th anniversary.

In 2023 Pringle of Scotland was acquired by Menoshi "Michael" Shina, owner of Crew Clothing and Moss Bros Group.
