= Jaeger (clothing) =

Fashion brand

- Type: Private
- Industry: Fashion
- Founded: 1884; 142 years ago
- Founder: Lewis Tomalin
- Headquarters: London, England, UK
- Products: Clothing; Accessories; Shoes
- Owner: Marks & Spencer
- Website: jaeger.co.uk

Jaeger (/ˈjeɪɡə/ YAY-gə) is a British fashion brand and retailer of womenswear and menswear. Traditionally known for a classic 'twinset and pearls' image and the use of high-quality natural fibres, it has focused on updating its brand image since 2008, when it first appeared at London Fashion Week.

Formerly owned by the retail entrepreneur Harold Tillman, the company was purchased in 2011 by the private equity firm Better Capital. In 2017, it was announced that Jaeger had entered administration. It was subsequently reported that Edinburgh Woollen Mill was buying the Jaeger brand, but not the company itself. In January 2021, it was announced that Marks & Spencer was acquiring the Jaeger brand, but not Jaeger's stores, for £5 million.

== Company history ==
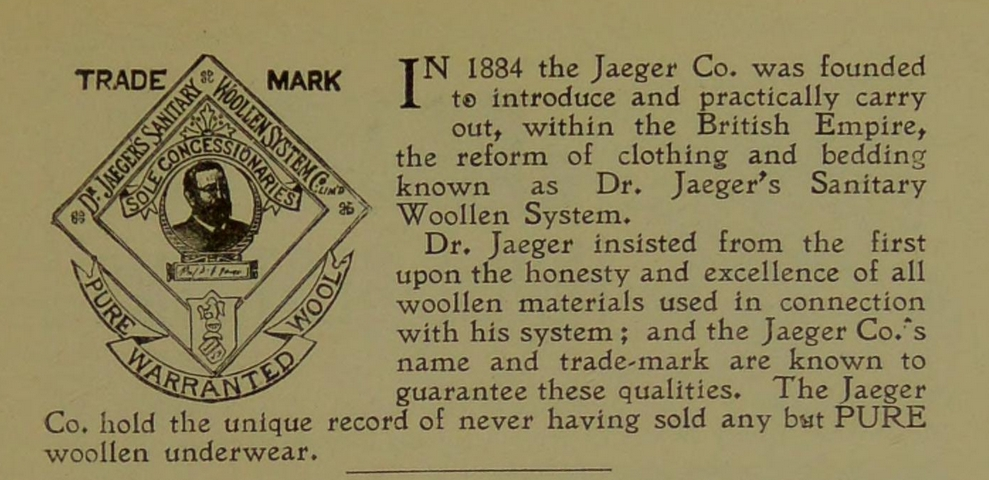

Jaeger was established by British businessman Lewis Tomalin as 'Dr Jaeger's Sanitary Woollen System Co Ltd' in 1884, capitalising on a craze for wool-jersey long johns inspired by the theories of German scientist Dr Gustav Jaeger. Jaeger's writings about the value of wearing animal fibres next to the skin rather than cotton had attracted fans including George Bernard Shaw. The woollen undergarments were worn by many explorers, including Ernest Shackleton. It had received its first Royal Warrant by 1910.

Jaeger began creating wool suits, and by the start of World War I it had cut its associations with Germany and become a British brand. Long johns for British and Commonwealth troops kept the company going during the war, but by the 1920s it had switched to fashion. The company's flagship store opened on Regent Street in the 1930s and attracted a solid clientele who wanted British-made garments at prices that were not as high as Savile Row or the high-end couture brands.

Natural fibres remained central to the brand, the camel hair coat was a Jaeger invention and it also utilised other exotic woollen fibres such as cashmere, angora and alpaca. Jaeger's yarns were also popularised via knitting patterns in the 1940s. The clothing was modelled by both Audrey Hepburn and Marilyn Monroe in the 1950s.

=== 1960s direction ===
Jaeger began attracting a younger client base in the 1960s, partly due to a revival in British fashion but also because of the influence of Jean Muir, who joined the company in 1956 and was put in charge of its more fashionable Young Jaeger brand, staying for six years before branching out on her own. During the 1960s Jaeger clothes were modelled by Jean Shrimpton and photographed by David Bailey, giving it credibility with a younger audience. In 1966, a Jaeger linen dress formed part of the Dress of the Year, as chosen by Sunday Times fashion editor Ernestine Carter.

The company was bought by Coats Paton, later Coats Viyella, in 1967.

=== 1990s on ===
By the 1990s, Jaeger was struggling, possibly because its customer base was ageing with the brand and with no younger audience to replace it. It has also been suggested that the influx of European brands perceived as more fashionable during the 1980s, including MaxMara and Escada, contributed to its dwindling customer base. There was a refocusing of the brand under the direction of design director Jeanette Todd and with some success, including picking up a British Fashion Award in 1996, but this was followed by a period of management turmoil. The company hired Bella Freud to update its image and she introduced designs inspired by its 1930s and '40s styles, along with a mini skirt, bomber jacket and Jaeger little black dress.

Coats sold Jaeger for a nominal fee to entrepreneur and former Queens Park Rangers F.C. chair Richard Thompson in 2003, by this stage it was a chain with almost 250 shops. It was swiftly re-sold by Thompson to retail entrepreneur and then British Fashion Council chair Harold Tillman. At this stage, the company was described as: "on its knees".

In 2004, Belinda Earl, formerly of Debenhams, was employed as CEO. For a time, it was tipped as the next Burberry and the appointment of Stuart Stockdale as design director garnered positive publicity. Its appearance at 2008 London Fashion Week, for the first time in its history also appeared to mark a stronger brand image. As of 2011, Jaeger had 45 UK stores and shipped to 38 countries worldwide. In the same year it was commissioned to create uniforms for staff at Kensington Palace.

== Current operation ==
In April 2012, Jaeger was acquired by Better Capital. In July 2013 Colin Henry was employed as CEO. In the same year, Jaeger appointed creative directors Jsen Wintle (menswear) and Sheila McKain-Waid (womenswear).

In 2014, Jaeger announced it would be increasing its UK sourcing to return the company to its historic reliance on UK factory production (a marker for the brand until 2000) aiming to produce 10-15 per cent of ranges in the UK by autumn 2014.

On 10 April 2017, it was announced that the company had entered administration. In May 2017, it was understood that Edinburgh Woollen Mill had bought the Jaeger brand and debt (but not the main company, or secured the future of its 700 staff or payments to its suppliers) from its former owner, Better Capital.

On 11 January 2021, it was announced that Marks & Spencer had acquired the Jaeger fashion brand (which fell into administration in November 2020), but not Jaeger's 63 shops and 13 concessions, for £5 million.
