= Chislehurst and Sidcup Grammar School =

Grammar school in Greater London, England

Location
- Hurst Road; Sidcup DA15 9AG, Greater London; England; 51.43643°N 0.10794°E

Information
- Type: Grammar school; Academy
- Motto: Abeunt Studia in Mores (From study, character grows.)
- Established: 17 September 1931; 95 years ago
- Local authority: Bexley
- Department for Education URN: 137423 Tables
- Ofsted: Reports
- Headmaster: Nigel Walker (2009–present)
- Gender: Mixed
- Age: 11 to 18
- Houses: Davies Edlmann Lester Townshend Staff Williams
- Colour: Purple
- Alumni: Old Sedcopians
- Website: http://www.csgrammar.com/

Chislehurst and Sidcup Grammar School is a mixed-sex grammar school with academy status located in Hurst Road (A222), Sidcup in the London Borough of Bexley, England. It is located adjacent to Lamorbey Park, the Rose Bruford College drama school and Hurstmere School. Pupils at the school are divided into a series of six houses, known as Davies, Edlmann, Lester, Staff, Townshend, and Williams, while an annual school magazine, The Chronicle, is also produced by the students. The current head teacher, Nigel Walker, has held his position since 2009.

Founded as the Sidcup County School for Boys in 1931 to meet the lack of secondary schools in the newly urbanised town, it was initially opened at 27 Station Road, with the position of first headmaster being given to C. R. McGregor Williams. In 1935, the school began moving into a purpose-built site at Crittall's Corner, Footscray, being renamed Chislehurst and Sidcup County School in 1938. Damaged during The Blitz, after the culmination of the Second World War, reforms implemented as a result of the Education Act 1944 led to the local decision that the institution would become a grammar school and that it would relocate to a new, larger building on Hurst Road in the Lamorbey area of Sidcup, a move that took place after the resignation of McGregor Williams in 1954.

As a result of the government's Circular 10/65 in 1965, plans were implemented to merge Chislehurst and Sidcup with the neighbouring Hurstmere into a single comprehensive school, although these were opposed by the successive Conservative Party administrations of Bexley Council, eventually being scuppered under the Conservative government of Prime Minister Margaret Thatcher in the 1980s. In 1973 the school was made co-educational, admitting female pupils alongside the male, resulting in the adoption of its current name. The school rose to national headlines in January 1983 following the suspension of most of the school's sixth form for drinking alcohol at the preceding Christmas party. In 2004 it became a sports college and in 2011 an academy.

== History ==
=== Foundation: 1930 ===
Having been an agricultural village since the Late Middle Ages, the Kentish town of Sidcup began to urbanise following the opening of Sidcup railway station on the South Eastern Railway's new Dartford Loop Line in 1866. The new transport links to central London led to increasing numbers of middle class professionals moving to the town, in particular from inner London suburbs such as Camberwell and New Cross, which were experiencing social unrest and a rise in slum housing. After the rail line's electrification following the culmination of the First World War, speculative builders bought up cheap farmland around the town and by 1930 its population had risen to just short of 12,000, and would treble within the next two decades.

Sidcup's dramatic population rise led to a strain on local schooling, with many boys having to travel several miles to Dartford and Erith to attend secondary school. This problem was exacerbated by the government's stated intention of raising the school leaving age to cut the number of unemployed in the midst of the Great Depression. For this reason, the Bexley and Sidcup Urban District Councils, and later the Bromley Rural and Chislehurst District Education Committee, requested that the Maidstone-centered Kent County Council finance the creation of a new school in the area. In April 1930, the council's Secondary and University Education Sub-Committee agreed to open up what they called the Sidcup County School for Boys on the old premises of the County School for Girls, which was then moving from its original site at 27 Station Road to a new, specially constructed site in Beaverwood Road.

=== 27 Station Road: 1931–1935 ===
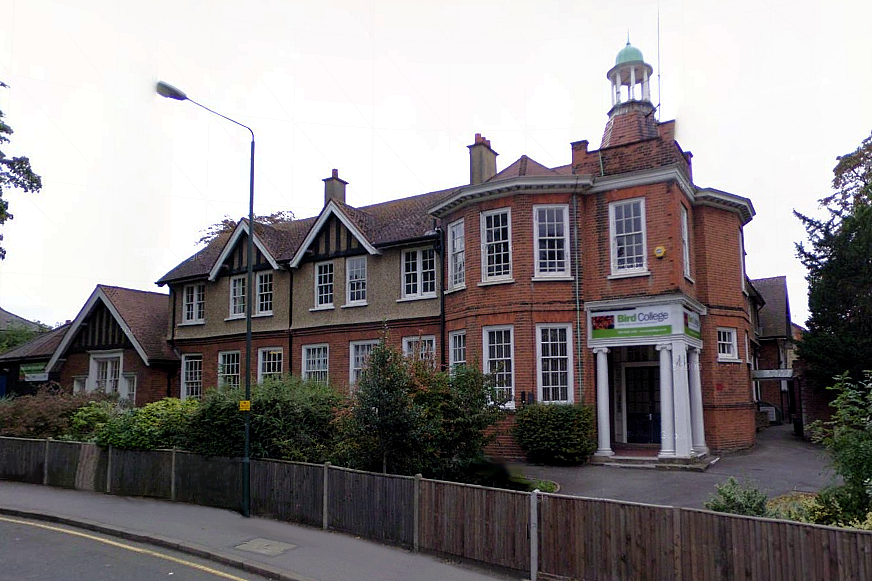
The original site of the Sidcup County School for Boys in Station Road, Sidcup. By 2009, when this photograph was taken, the site was occupied by Bird College, devoted to dance and the performing arts.

The red-brick site at 27 Station Road had been built in 1900 to house the Sidcup High School for Girls and Kindergarten, although additional office space was added in 1930 to convert it into the boys school. In July, the Secondary Education Sub-Committee began advertising to find a headmaster for the school, and in the following Spring appointed Welshman C. R. McGregor Williams (1889–1954), who had formerly been the headmaster of the recently closed Uckfield Grammar School, Sussex. The son of a tailor, McGregor Williams was born in Newport and educated at Newport High School and Cardiff College, University of Wales, where he gained a degree in modern languages. Having fought for the British Army at the Battle of the Somme, he later taught at what would become Varndean School in Brighton. He spent his spare time studying for an MA with a thesis on Molière's religious philosophy from the University of Wales and in 1926 obtained a doctorate on the poetry of John Payne from the University of Paris.

Williams chose the school's motto of "Abeunt Studia in Mores", which he had taken from Ovid's Heroides, in which it is proclaimed by the poet Sappho in her love letter to Phaon. Williams also chose purple as the school's colour, supposedly because it was associated with war wounds and liturgical mourning, something that he and his wife considered appropriate following the death toll of the First World War. It was agreed that the school would initially take in 62 boys, of whom 52 would be fee-paying, 8 of whom would have free-place scholarships and 2 of which would be "junior exhibitioners". Fee-paying residents of either Kent or London counties were charged £4 a term, while "outsiders" were instead charged £10. Half of the first intake of students lived in Sidcup itself, while the others mostly came from neighbouring districts such as Petts Wood, Chislehurst, Orpington, Foots Cray and New Eltham. The school opened on Thursday 17 September 1931, with a dedication ceremony taking place on Friday 25 September.

"Few people become legends in their own lifetime but C.R. McGregor Williams, over the twenty-three years of his leadership, can surely lay claim to that distinction. In the half century or so since his death his reputation may be said to have expanded into the realms of the epic, perhaps even the mythical, at least as far as Sidcup is concerned."

— Historian Charles Wells, 2002.

During its first year, the school began production of its own magazine, The Chronicle, while the house system was introduced in the spring term of 1932. Initially, there were only four school houses, known as A, B, C and D. In 1937, two more, E and F, were added. It would only be in 1953 that these houses were renamed. In October 1932, the school first expelled a pupil, William Duck, as punishment for allegedly spitting at passers-by from an open-top bus. Headmaster McGregor Williams was widely known for his scruffy appearance about the school. He was often stern towards the students, and implemented corporal punishment to punish disobedient pupils, beating them with a sawn-off cricket bat; he was twice prosecuted in court for using excessive force in this manner, but was acquitted on both occasions.

This view of Macgregor Williams is not supported by all. Pupils attending in his years as head report that they witnessed no evidence of beatings or indeed that he was a scruffy individual.

A staunch supporter of the Conservative Party, he adored drama and took part in some of the school's early performances, as well as introducing the sport of lacrosse, of which he was a keen fan, to the school. In July 1933, the school's first foreign trip went ahead, with McGregor Williams' taking pupils to the Rhineland in Germany. At the time under the control of the Nazi regime of Adolf Hitler, the school continued taking pupils to the region in future years; in 1937 McGregor Williams and his pupils traveled the country wearing swastika armbands which they had been given by members of the Hitler Youth movement.

=== Crittall's Corner: 1935–1954 ===
The old building at 27 Station Road had always been intended as a temporary site for the school, with a larger, purpose-built building planned for construction at Crittall's Corner, just south of the town. (Note: The location takes its name from Crittall Windows Ltd, which had a factory nearby.) The first wing of the new building opened on 11 November 1935 and for a while the school remained divided between the two sites, with students' often having to travel across Sidcup to get to different lessons. Construction of the building only came to an end in 1938, when the school was moved in its entirety to the new site. The new building, designed by John Poltock – who would later design Cairo's Victoria College – was a modernist construct known for its prominent use of large metal-framed windows that allowed the building to be filled with natural light. Designed to house 660 students, more than were currently enrolled in the school, it was widely acclaimed both in architectural journals and in the popular press. It was also in 1935 that the school introduced purple blazers for uniforms, although the majority of students continued to wear their grey blazers; it would only be in the 1950s that the school's students had gone entirely over to purple. In 1938, the school was renamed Chislehurst and Sidcup County School; this was because the Sidcup Urban District Council had been abolished in 1934, its role being adopted by the newly created Chislehurst and Sidcup Urban District Council.

In 1939, Britain entered the Second World War and a number of the school's teachers were called up to fight in the British Army. Headmaster McGregor Williams meanwhile joined the Home Guard, eventually becoming the head of the Chislehurst platoon. At the school, the students set about digging out trenches to use as bomb shelters and assemblies were cancelled. Students were expected to carry their gas masks around with them in case of chemical attack and during the ensuing Blitz – in which the German Luftwaffe began bombing London and the areas around it – the school was affected by a nearby landmine on 17 September 1940, destroying the glass of all the windows on one side. On 16 June 1944, the school was once more struck, this time by a V-1 flying bomb which destroyed one end of the Assembly Hall; much of the damage to the school would not be permanently repaired until 1951. By the time that the war came to an end in 1945, 280 former pupils and 13 members of staff had fought in the armed forces, with 45 of them having been killed.

In 1944, Conservative politician Rab Butler put forward the Education Act 1944, suggesting a large-scale reform of British schools by introducing a "tripartite system" that divided students based on their academic ability and allocating them to one of three schools: the grammar school, secondary technical school and secondary modern school. Deciding how to implement these reforms on a local scale, in 1946, E. V. Mills chaired a meeting of the Divisional Executive in which they suggested radically changing the schooling system in the area. They decided that Chislehurst and Sidcup County School would become a grammar and would be moved from its site at Crittall's Corner to a much larger space at Lamorbey in Sidcup, where it would be situated alongside a newly built technical school, Hurstmere School. Meanwhile, the site at Crittall's Corner would be converted into a secondary modern, which would later be known as Kemnal Technology College. This was partly to alleviate problems of overcrowding; the population of the local area had tripled since 1931 and the Crittall's Corner building was taking in more than the number of students that it had been built to accommodate.

The decision to move the school was deeply opposed by Headmaster McGregor Williams, who wanted his school to remain within the Crittall's Corner building, of which he was particularly fond; he wrote letters to Members of Parliament suggesting expansion at the present site, but to no avail. He decided to retire prior to the move to the new site, stepping down in July 1953 and dying five months later. Meanwhile, academic achievement at the school remained high in the post-war years, with a large percentage of pupils going on to gain university degrees. Of note is that the July 1946 issue of The Chronicle contained several illustrations by a student, Quentin Blake, later to become a famous illustrator. Blake subsequently became the magazine's editor, a position he retained from 1949 to 1951.

=== Hurst Road, Sidcup 1954-67 ===
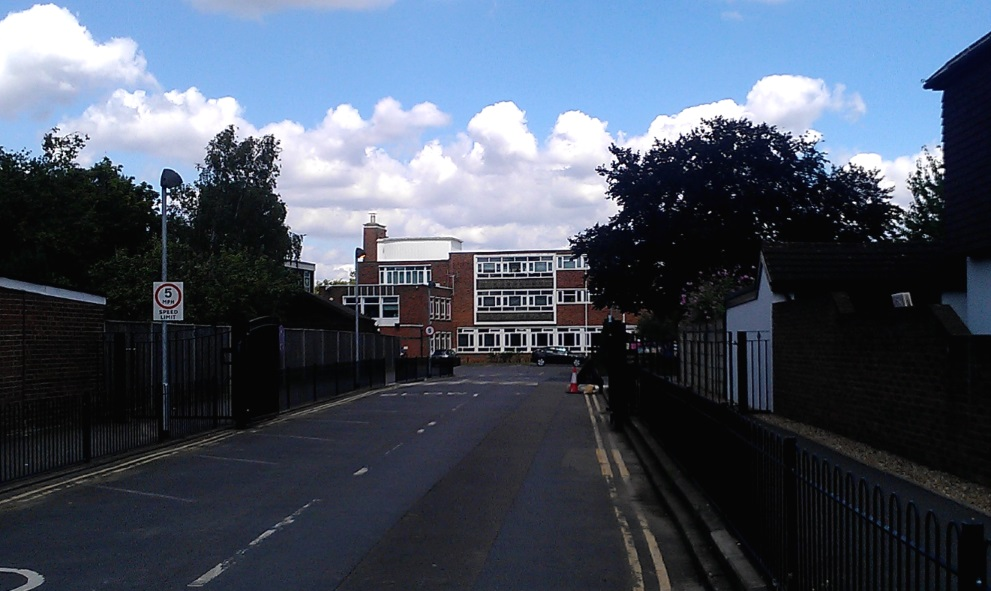
The entrance to the Hurst Road site

The new building had been constructed on land once belonging to the Medieval manor of Lamorbey House. The manor house to which the school was now adjacent had been rebuilt in the eighteenth century and by 1950 was housing Rose Bruford College. Chis and Sid's new building was designed by Howard C. Lobb & Partners of Gower Street, in conjunction with the Kent County Architects S. H. Loweth and E. T. Ashley Smith. As a result of post-war austerity, the building was constructed on a tight budget of under £300,000 and consisted of reinforced concrete and portal frames, with a brickwork finish. The design was largely deemed to be aesthetically unpleasing by both students and staff, although it did allow them access to twice as much land as they had had at Crittal's Corner. Opening in 1954, it was officially opened in a ceremony led by the Lord Lieutenant of Kent and the Bishop of Rochester. As part of the move, in September 1954 it had been decided that the school houses would be renamed as Davies, Edlmann, Williams, Staff, Townshend and Lester, all figures who had played a prominent role in the school's history. The move also saw a change in the school's winter sport from football to rugby, although cricket remained the school's summer sport.

The new headmaster was Richard "Dick" Pedley (1912–1973); born in Dorset, Pedley had studied English at Downing College, Cambridge before serving in the Royal Artillery during World War II. Prior to becoming Head at Chis and Sid he had taught at City Boys' School, Leicester and St. Olave's School, Bromley. Fiercely competitive, he encouraged a heightened spirit of competitiveness within the school, strongly emphasising academic achievement with the intent of getting as many students as possible to go on to study at the University of Oxford or Cambridge University. His success in this aim led to the school's attaining a national reputation and within the maintained school sector, only Harrow College rivaled its achievements. Opinions about Pedley among staff varied greatly, however, because his autocratic management style was criticised for achieving success for some pupils at the expense of others.

"The School's aim is to encourage the pursuit of excellence and to develop the highest potentialities of that minority of children upon whom the health and wealth of this country in the future will depend."

— Pedley at Speech Day 1965, reflecting his opposition to comprehensive education

In 1965, the London Government Act 1963 came into force, transferring Chis and Sid from the county of Kent to the newly created Greater London. Now part of the London Borough of Bexley, it lost access to three quarters of its former catchment area, which remained under the jurisdiction of Kent County Council. Further change came under the Labour Party government of Prime Minister Harold Wilson, whose Secretary of State for Education, Anthony Crosland, outlined plans to replace the country's tripartite system of secondary education with the egalitarian comprehensive school system. The Labour-run Bexley Council agreed to this project, pushing ahead with plans to convert Chis and Sid into a comprehensive, as part of which it would be merged with the neighbouring Hurstmere in 1969. Pedley was a vocal critic of the comprehensive system on both a national and a local level. He fought the council's plans to convert the school and was supported by a unanimous resolution passed by staff and by a Parents' Association founded in 1966. When the council nevertheless approved the plan in May 1967, Pedley resigned as headmaster in protest.

=== Looming comprehensivisation and co-educational status: 1967–79 ===
Pedley was succeeded by Michael Brown (b.1927), who had previously worked as Headmaster of Prescot Grammar School. Born in Lancaster, Brown was a lay Methodist preacher who had a degree in history from Emmanuel College, Cambridge and a master's degree in Theology from St Peter's College, Oxford. Although staff found him to be courteous, modest and a good listener, unlike his predecessors, they were largely unhappy that he was a supporter of the comprehensive system. Despite staff fears that his egalitarian ethos would promote mediocrity, admissions to Oxford and Cambridge rose under Brown's leadership. In April 1968, the Conservatives took control of Bexley council and scrapped plans to merge Chis and Sid and Hurstmere into a single comprehensive. However, still obliged by central government to abolish the eleven plus exam which had allocated primary school children to a particular form of secondary school under the tripartite system, a compromise was developed. Chis and Sid was to officially cease to be a grammar school, although it would still be able to choose which students it would accept, based on their academic ability. At the same time it was decided that Chis and Sid was to become co-educational and thus admit girls as well as boys. The need for this latter change had become acute; the 1960s boundary changes had left the London Borough of Bexley with no grammar schools for girls and only one co-educational grammar (Bexley Grammar School), while the neighbouring London Borough of Bromley had five grammar schools for girls.

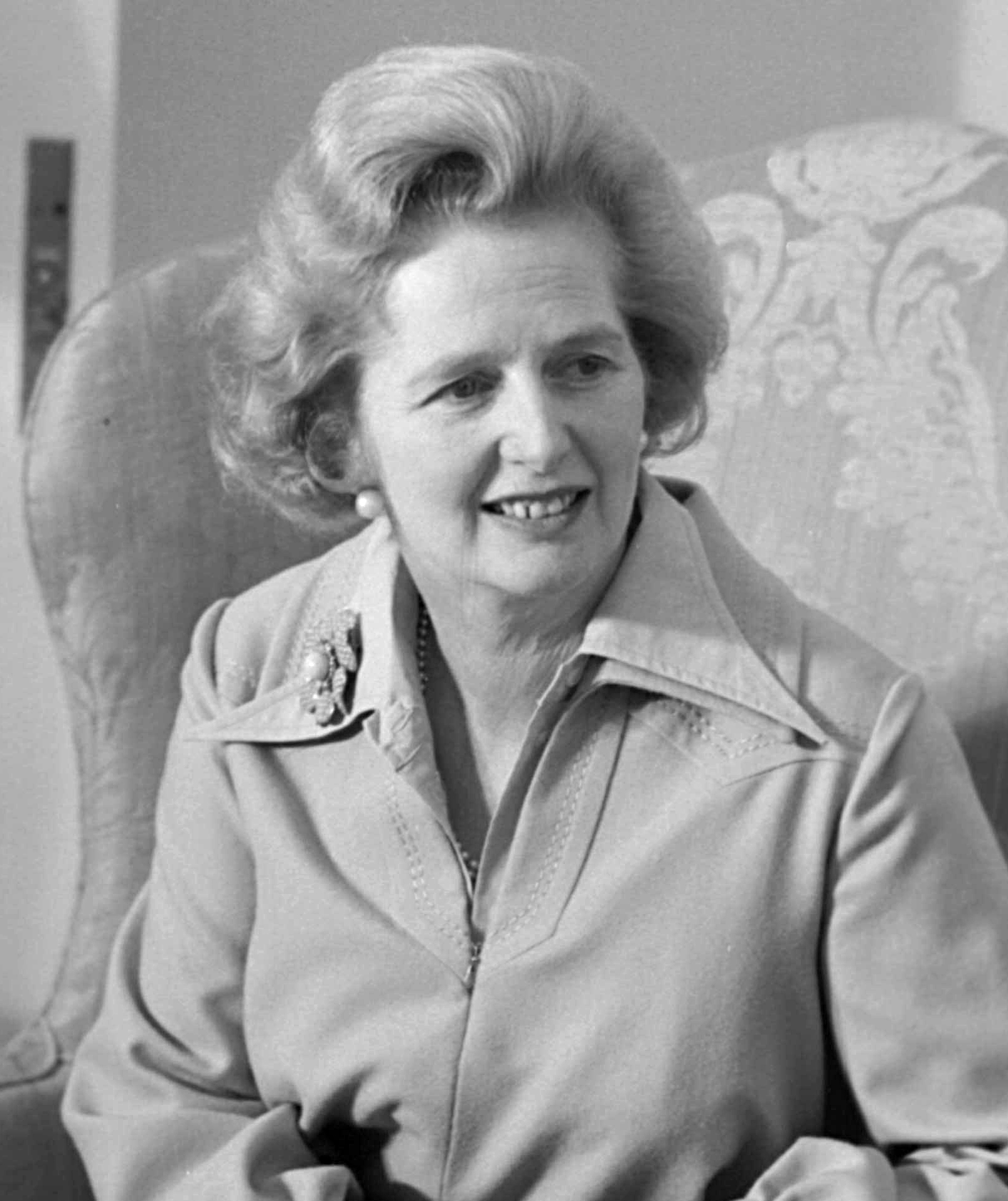
As Secretary of State for Education, Margaret Thatcher (pictured above) prevented Bexley Council's plans to merge Chis and Sid and Hurstmere into a single comprehensive school

In 1971, Labour regained Bexley Council and pushed forward with the plan to merge Chis and Sid and Hurstmere into a single comprehensive, although in May 1972 this plan was denied permission to proceed by the Conservative Secretary of State for Education, Margaret Thatcher. As a step toward the ultimate establishment of comprehensive education throughout the borough, in 1973 the council announced plans to remove the words "secondary modern", "technical high" and "grammar" from all schools under their jurisdiction, resulting in protests from both staff and the parents' association at Chis and Sid. In 1974, the Conservatives then regained the council, proceeding to effectively ignore Labour's 1976 Education Act that required the making comprehensive of all secondary education. The chair of Bexley's Educational Committee, Brian Sams, insisted that the borough would not implement the legally required changes until every school in the area had the facilities capable of supporting a "curriculum adapted to the needs of pupils of all abilities". In the 1979 general election, Thatcher was elected Prime Minister and the pressure for the making comprehensive of all schools, from central government, ceased, allowing Bexley Borough to continue using the grammar school system.

On 4 May 1971, four home-made bombs were found in the woods adjoining the school. The authorities suspected that these belonged to the far left militant group known as Angry Brigade. 1972 witnessed Chislehurst and Sidcup's first school trip outside Europe, as 150 boys traveled to New York City. Soon after, the wearing of caps as part of the school uniform was abolished. Links were established between Chis and Sid and the nearby Marlborough Special School for children with special needs, while in 1974 the school's literary society secured Kenneth Williams to speak to them. The first girls arrived at the school in September 1973, representing the sixty female pupils who had the highest test scores from the local primary system. Accordingly, the term "for Boys" was removed from the school's name, while hockey and netball were introduced as sports for the girls to play. Some resentment arose however over the issue of punishment; while boys were still exposed to corporal punishment in the form of caning and (unofficial) slapping, girls were exempt from these measures. During the general election of 1974, the BBC filmed their election count, presented by David Dimbleby, from the school's main hall, having chosen the building because it was located in the parliamentary constituency of Old Bexley and Sidcup, which was the seat represented by the sitting Conservative Prime Minister Edward Heath. After losing that election to Labour, Heath spoke to the school's pupils at the following speech day. In 1975, an additional building, the New Block was constructed on a very tight budget.

=== "Sozzlehurst and Hiccup": 1980–1999 ===
The Sun newspaper published this satirical cartoon depicting the events of December 1982 in which they labelled the school "Sozzlehurst and Hiccup". Historian Charles Wells would note that by 2002 it had become "famous – or notorious".

In April 1977, John Sennett (b.1934) was introduced as the new headmaster. Born in Plymouth, he had studied history at Sidney Sussex College, Cambridge and subsequently taught at Manchester Grammar School. A Quaker and pacifist, he had refused to serve his national service, resulting in some initial suspicion about him, however his support for the grammar school system and his conscientious, genial nature enabled him to get along with the school's staff. In 1981, the school celebrated its golden jubilee with a variety of events, including a Jubilee Walk that took in both Station Road and Crittall's Corner; these activities were used to raise money for an extension to the school's library. That year's school play, a performance of William Shakespeare's As You Like It, was directed by English teacher John Hazelgrove and won Bexley Arts Trophy's Best Play of the Year award, beating a variety of adult drama groups.

In December 1982, sixth formers held a morning Christmas party in the sixth-form centre, during which alcohol was consumed. One pupil fell over and was taken away by ambulance with minor injuries, while another pupil was sent home for being drunk. During the ensuing Christmas holidays, Sennet decided that he should punish those who had been involved in the party. In January 1983, at the start of the spring term, he requested written confessions of guilt from those who had consumed alcohol, stating that this would result in a one-day suspension, with 160 pupils producing such confessions. At this point he changed his mind, deciding that he would provide different degrees of punishment based on the quantity of alcohol that each student individually consumed. The sixth form body refused to accept this, deeming it to be a form of victimisation and so insisted that it be judged as a collective and punished accordingly. Sennet then suspended all 160 pupils for a day.

Somebody had contacted a British tabloid, The Sun, to inform them of the events and being a slow news day, they ran the incident on their front page, proclaiming "School Band 157 Boozing Pupils". The journalist responsible, Robert Bolton, added fresh elements to the story, claiming that 5 students had had to be taken to hospital as a result of their drinking, while others had smoked marijuana. Soon, other newspapers had picked up on the story, with journalists offering £5 to students outside the school gates who could provide the most lurid and sensationalist accounts of the events. As a result, The Star went with the headline "Sixth Form Banned After Brandy Orgy" while Daily Express decided on "The Day my Sixth Form went Wild". Broadsheet The Daily Telegraph also reported on the story, but only gave it a few paragraphs under the title of "160 Pupils Suspended after Party". Reporters from the BBC local news picked up on it, while the following day, The Sun returned to the story with an editorial cartoon by Franklin in which the school was referred to as "Sozzlehurst and Hiccup". According to historian Charles Wells, the event represented "the School's one undeniable moment of national fame".

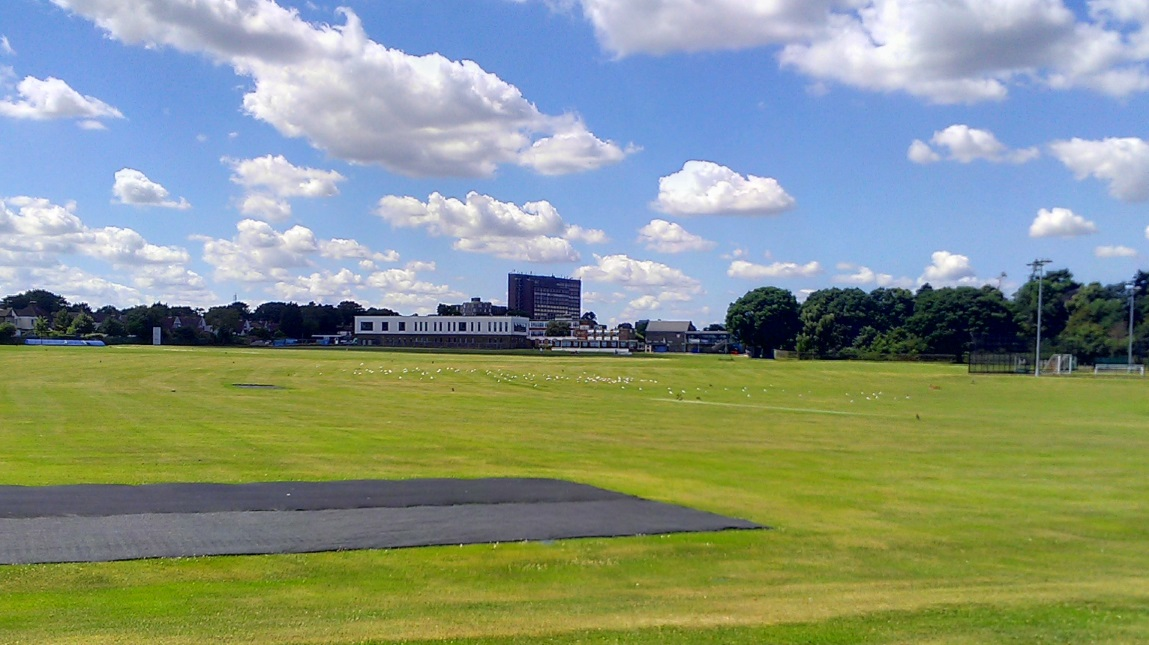
The school (visible in centre ground) has a number of sports fields, some shared with neighbouring Hurstmere School

The period between 1983 and 1994 witnessed a rapid array of initiatives introduced by the Conservative government, including GCSEs, the Baker Contract, AS levels, a national curriculum with key stages and attainment targets, local financial management, grant maintained status, SATs, OFSTED inspections, staff appraisal and coursework examination, all of which caused a great deal of disruption to the school and contributed to an increased turnover of new staff in this period, with many new teachers' swiftly exiting the profession. Wells suggested that this chaotic educational environment resulted in more difficulties for Chis and Sid than at any point in its history except during World War II. The school also witnessed a small decline in the grades achieved by its pupils, in part due to the increasingly localised and concomitantly decreasingly selective nature of admissions, although this decline was greatly exaggerated by the local press.

In 1986, corporal punishment was abolished in state schools, including at Chis and Sid. That year, the school won its second Bexley Arts Council Award for its adaptation of Oh What a Lovely War, again directed by Hazelgrove. In 1984 the school celebrated the first red nose day, raising £6000 for charities aiding Ethiopian famine victims, while in 1990 it held its first non uniform day to raise money for charity, an event that became a regular institution in the school. On 11 July 1992, one of the school's pupils, Rohit Duggal, was stabbed to death in Eltham, with a tree's being planted in his memory outside the dining hall. In 1994, James 'Jim' Rouncefield (b.1951) was appointed headteacher. Born in Redruth, Cornwall, Rouncefield had studied geography at Goldsmiths College and prior to getting the Chis and Sid job had worked as head of Chatham Grammar School for Boys. Shortly after he started his tenure, the school experienced its first OFSTED inspection, which criticised the condition of the building and endorsed a reduction in the staffing budget, resulting in subsequent staff being hired on lower wages but with higher workloads. In 1996 a new sixth form centre was opened, having cost £100,000 to construct, while in 1997 personal computers were installed in the library, and in 1998 a tannoy system was installed in the school. That year, a second OFSTED inspection concluded that the school had greatly improved since 1994. In December 1999 a newly rebuilt Music Block was ceremonially opened by the Mayor of Bexley, and in 2000 the roof of the New Block was replaced. The school then embarked on plans to construct a new sports' block, the Jubilee Pavilion, and sought sports' college status.

=== Since 2000 ===
In 2004, Jim Rouncefield left his post as Headmaster and Dr Joe Vitagliano took over. The school soon gained joint sports college status with the neighbouring Hurstmere School and in 2004 the Jubilee Pavilion was built primarily for sports (it contained changing rooms and a dance studio).

By early 2006 the school crest was abolished and a new adaptation was introduced.

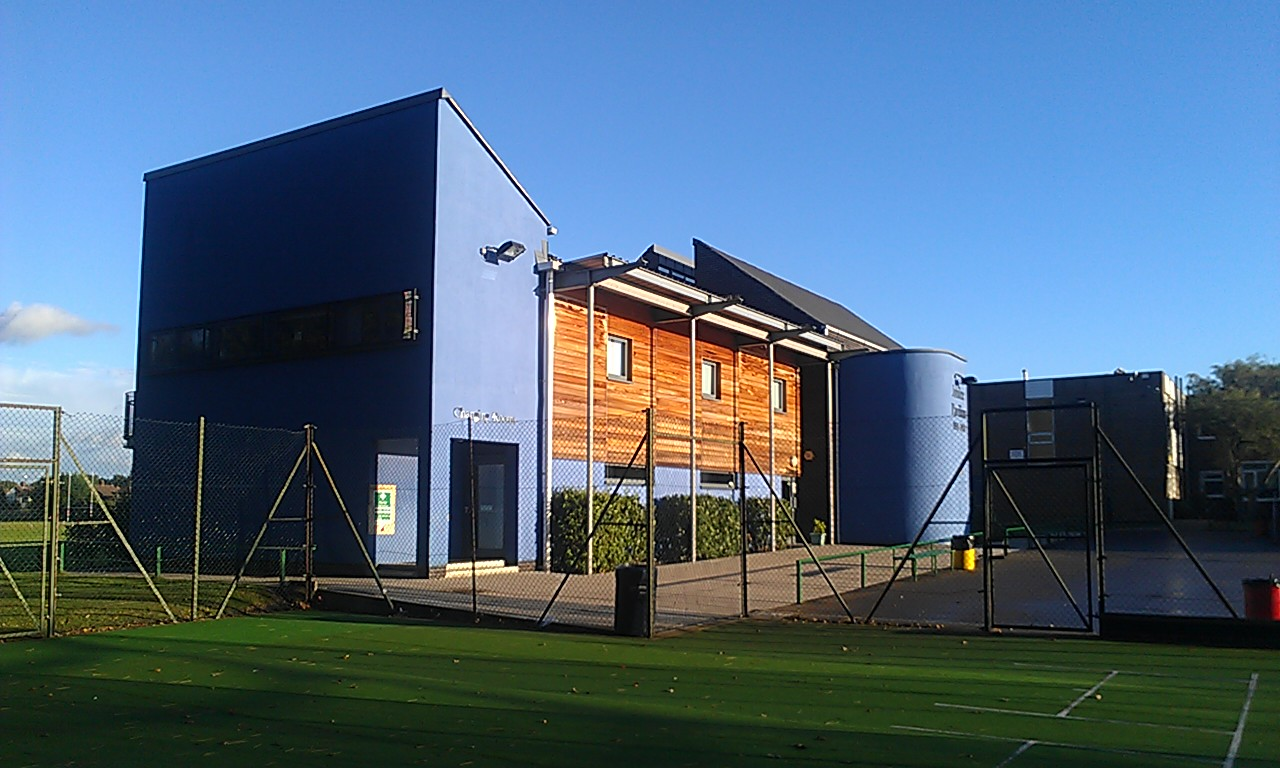
The Jubilee Pavilion sports block, constructed in the 2000s

A few years later the Quentin Blake Block, which includes art and technology rooms, was built for £3.5 million for the Art and Design Departments, which contained within it the Curve Gallery, which has since held an annual exhibition of student art, along with various other exhibitions (including a retrospective of the work of local artist Bill Hudson, entitled "Routes").

On 1 October 2008, Mayor of London and former Conservative MP Boris Johnson visited the school to officially open the new sports centre. In 2009, Vitagliano left and Mr Nigel Walker, the former deputy head, took over his position.

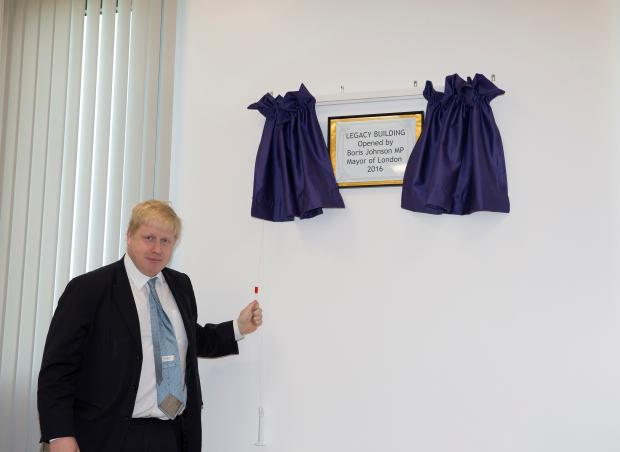
Mayor of London, Boris Johnson, opens new sixth form centre

On 5 November 2009, a team composed of former students from the class of 2004 named "Sozzlehurst and Hiccup" competed on BBC Two quiz show Eggheads, losing narrowly in the final round.

The school converted to academy status on 1 September 2011.

After conversion to academy status the school underwent various building and renovation projects. During the summer holidays of 2012 the school driveway was renovated with the inclusion of gates and railings to separate students from the road. The new gates were designed by pupils through a competition run by the school. The following academic year the windows in the main building were all replaced with double glazing to improve efficiency and comfort. In 2013 the school bought the BMW Group Pavilion Building, which stood in the 2012 London Olympic Park, for £1. The building became the new site for the Sixth Form and Marlborough Special Needs School, as well as the Business, Economics and Psychology departments. Construction of the building began in the summer of 2014 and it was officially opened on 3 March 2016 by Mayor of London Boris Johnson. After opening the building the old study centre was converted into the Learning Support Room. The library was also closed, with the study area being converted to a classroom, and the library being refurbished with new furniture.

From mid-2014 until late-2016 improvement works took place throughout the majority of the school to replace an ageing pipework and central heating system. This was funded by £1.5 million from the Community Improvement Fund. Pipework was replaced in the main building, humanities block, and the music block.

In December 2014 the school acquired planning permission for a new performing arts centre, to be built on the site of the existing Marlborough School classrooms. The proposed building was to include classrooms and performance areas for drama and music students. Also included in the planning application are supplemental projects to extend part of the existing Jubilee Pavilion, and demolish an existing drama classroom to expand the canteen. However, new permission was granted in 2016 for a single story building, to provide two drama studios and 4 general classrooms. This superseded the previously granted planning permission. Work on these projects began in January 2017. These works were completed by September and in use at the beginning at the school academic year.

== Notable students and staff ==
- Colin Bennett (actor), former assistant on Take Hart
- Air Commodore David Best OBE. MOD Chief Test Pilot, NATO Air Operations Director, Entrepreneur (Founder, Nova Systems Europe). Head of School 1978-1979.
- Keith Beven FRS, hydrologist
- Peter Birks, Regius Professor of Civil Law from 1989 to 2004 at the University of Oxford
- Quentin Blake, illustrator, opened the Quentin Blake Building, the new Art and Technology block, in 2007.
- Matthew Brimson, cricketer
- Ian Button, musician
- Grahame Clinton, opening batsman
- Matthew Collings, art writer, married to Emma Biggs
- Air Vice-Marshal Michael Donaldson MBE, Station Commander from 1987 to 1989 of RAF Wattisham, Commandant from 1992 to 1993 of the Royal Observer Corps, Commandant from 1993 to 1996 of RAF Staff College, Bracknell and Principal from 1996 to 2003 of Yorkshire Coast College
- Rohit Duggal, murder victim
- Air Vice-Marshal John Ernsting CB OBE.
- Karl Glazebrook, astronomer
- Morris Gleitzman, writer of popular stories for young people, attended the school from 1964 till his family emigrated to Australia in 1969.
- Peter Hambly, animal welfare expert and climate change campaigner
- Eddie Harvey, jazz trombonist and pianist
- Steve Hillier, internationally successful songwriter and record producer attended school from 1980 to 1987
- Will Hutton, economics writer and columnist, was a pupil during the 1960s
- Henry Kamen, historian
- David Masser FRS, Professor of Mathematics at the University of Basel.
- Kevin McKenna (politician), Labour MP for Sittingbourne and Sheppey
- Phil Méheux, cinematographer
- Billy Mitchell (footballer, born 2001), First team footballer at Millwall F.C.
- Beric Morley, architectural historian
- Tim Page, war photographer who studied at the school from 1955 to 1961, being expelled during his final week for refusing to submit to a caning.
- Mark Philp, political philosopher and historian.
- Richard Quinn, Fashion designer awarded inaugural Queen Elizabeth II Award for British Design. Richard Quinn shows at London fashion week and is known for his floral prints.
- Jeffrey Jon Shaw OBE, parasitologist, best known for his work on Leishmania
- Stanley Simmonds, painter (art teacher 1949–1983)
- Sam Smith, founder and chief executive of FinnCap
- Julian Spalding, art critic, curator and broadcaster
- Nigel Warburton, philosopher
- Nigel Williamson, former Times journalist
