= David Best =

David Best may refer to:

- David Best (sculptor) (born 1945), American sculptor
- David Best (footballer) (1943–2025), English former professional footballer
- David Best (politician) (1880–1949), politician in Manitoba, Canada
- David Best (pilot) (born 1960), British test pilot and businessman
