= Brimson (surname) =

Brimson is an English surname derived from Bréançon, Val d'Oise, and evidenced during the Middle Ages in Essex, where Brimstone Hill in Little Wakering is named after the family.

Notable people of this surname include:

- Dougie Brimson (born 1959), English author and screenwriter
- Matthew Brimson (born 1970), former English cricketer

== See also ==
- Brimson (disambiguation)
