= Peter Hambly =

British environmental campaigner and communicator (born 1965)

Peter Hambly (born 1965) is a British animal welfare expert and campaigner on wildlife and environmental issues arising from the impact of climate change. He was Carbon Trust's first marketing director at its creation in 2001, and served in that role for nearly two decades until July 2020. Presently he is Chief Executive of Badger Trust, leading the campaign against the badger cull since December 2021. He is a national commentator on issues around the badger cull - appearing on radio, TV and regularly quoted in national news outlets.

Hambly is a member of Wildlife and Countryside Link and serves as a member of its bovine tuberculosis group and wildlife crime group.

== Career ==
At Carbon Trust he created and launched the world's first carbon footprint label which is now featured on thousands of products. He also successfully rolled out the disbursement of £100 million of business loans for energy efficiency. Hambly ran the first UK national business advertising campaign around reducing carbon emissions and taking action on climate change in 2004. In 2007 Carbon Trust won the marketing campaign of the year for its elephant in the room campaign around business carbon footprints, as well as best Green website for its carbon label work.

Previous to Carbon Trust Hambly ran the successful campaign to win 90 marginal seats for the Labour Party (UK) in the 1997 UK General Election, was Campaign Manager for the £100 million + Full Stop campaign at the NSPCC, and Head of External Projection for Labour at the 2001 UK General Election.

At Badger Trust Hambly co-ordinated the campaign against the badger cull which has been killing badgers since 2013. Using scientific arguments and the co-authored report "Tackling bTB together" published in January 2024, this helped lay the basis for the Labour Party's 2024 manifesto promise in the UK General Election to end the badger cull. This they have pledged to do by 2029. Hambly reiterated badgers are not a significant spreader of bTB to cattle - cattle to cattle are responsible for around 94% of the spread.
