= Murder of Rolan Adams =

1991 murder in England

Rolan Adams
- Born: 21 March 1975
- Died: 21 February 1991 (aged 15); Thamesmead, south-east London, England
- Known for: Victim of a racially motivated murder

Rolan Adams (21 March 1975 – 21 February 1991) was a Black British boy who was murdered as the result of a racist hate crime in 1991. He is frequently associated in connection to Stephen Lawrence, another teenager from a neighbouring area in south-east London, who was later killed in a similar incident. The deaths of these teenagers influenced the public view of racially motivated attacks in south-east London at the time. Their deaths also influenced activist movements in other areas, including the United States.

== Rolan's background ==
Those who knew Rolan described him as a good student, dedicated football player, and talented musician. At the time of his death at age 15, Rolan was preparing to take his pre-university exams, had been scouted by a professional football club, West Ham United, and was working on recording original music he wrote. Rolan's family moved to Abbey Wood, an area in south-east London, five years prior to his death. At the time of the crime, Rolan was responsible for taking care of his younger brother, Nathan, and his younger sister, Lauren, while his parents were at work.

== Societal context ==
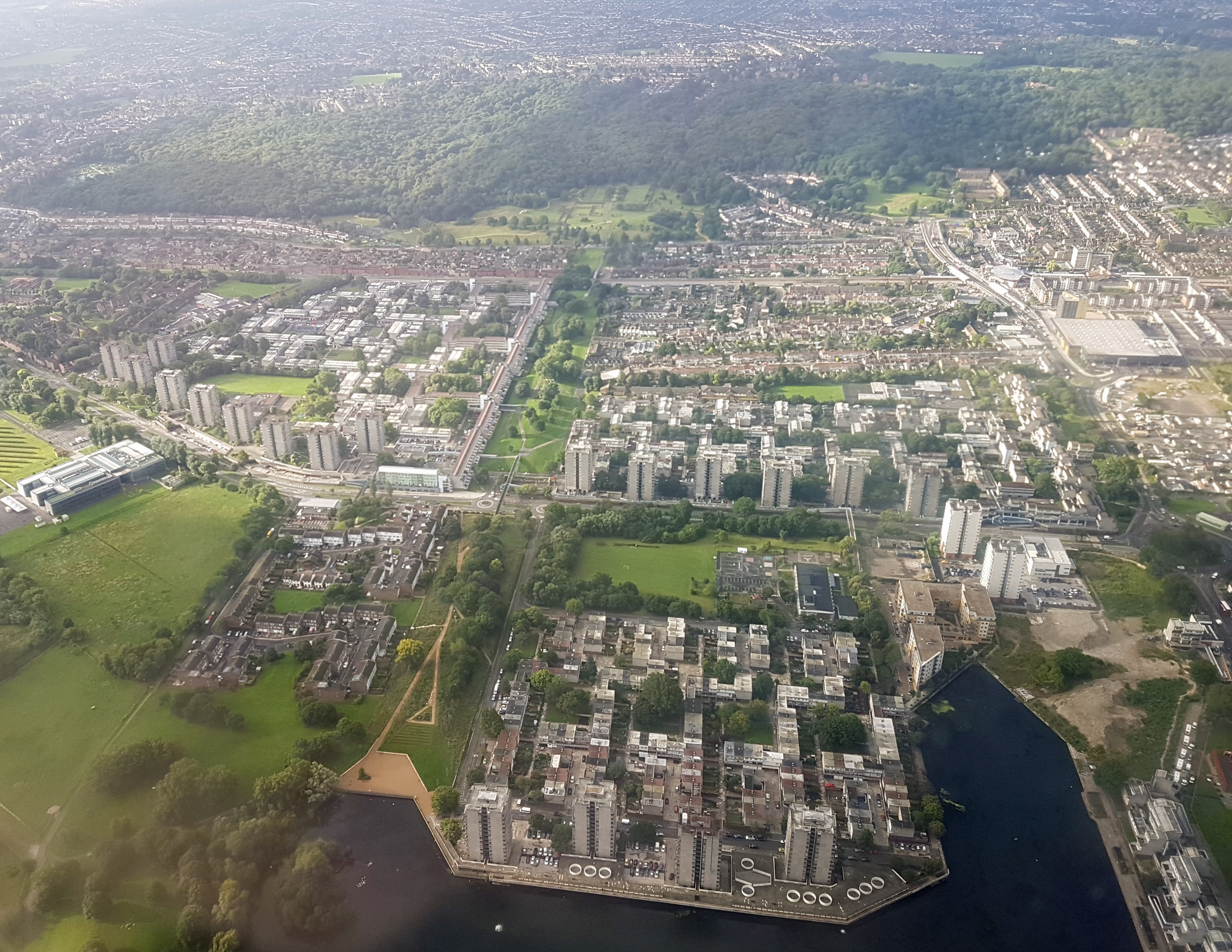
Aerial view of Thamesmead, the area where Rolan Adams was murdered

Thamesmead, where Rolan was murdered, at the time was predominately populated by white families with some Asian and Caribbean families scattered throughout. The immigration of black people to England increased in the late 1940s and 1950s, leading to racial tensions in the following decades. In the areas around Thamesmead, certain housing policies favored white people and created a hostile environment for people of colour. Reported racially motivated violence in south-east London was increasing in the 1990s, and Thamesmead itself had started to develop a reputation for being 'racially charged'. This was also in part due to the headquarters of the far-right British National Party being in nearby Welling. The extremist party had a reputation for fascist or racist ideologies. Adolescent gangs with these beliefs developed in areas throughout south-east London. These often dangerous groups grew between the 1980s and 1990s. One main gang called the Goldfish was also known as the NTO, the Nutty Turn Out, and then later evolved into the Nazi Turn-Outs. This group is attributed as being Rolan's assailants.

== Murder details ==
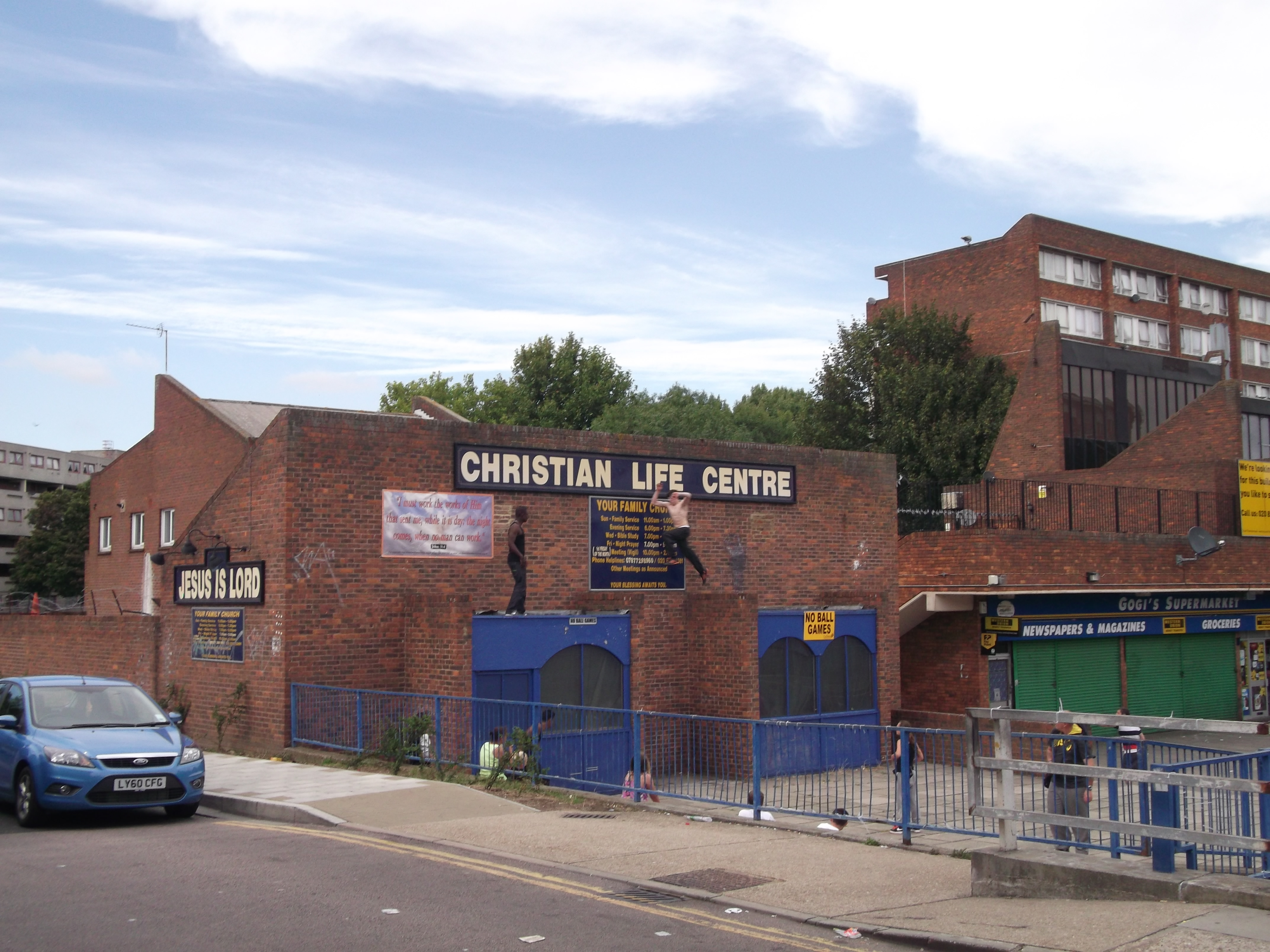
The Wildfowler pub, now an African Church (pictured here in 2011)

On Friday 21 February 1991, Rolan Adams and his brother Nathan, fifteen and fourteen years old respectively, were unknowingly being followed as they walked from Thamesmead's multicultural Hawksmoor Youth Centre. They had finished playing table tennis, and were going to a bus stop to get to their home in Abbey Wood, south-east London. Upon arrival at the bus stop, they were surrounded by a large group of 12–15 older white youths, members of the NTOs, who had been drinking at the Wildfowler pub. While Rolan and Nathan were being harassed and racially abused, one gang member, nineteen-year-old Mark Thornborrow, stabbed Rolan in the neck with a butterfly knife. In an attempt to flee, Rolan started to run while yelling at Nathan to do the same. The two got separated. The gang members were chasing and yelling profanities and racial slurs at them, including 'niggers'. Nathan managed to escape, but Rolan collapsed and died soon afterwards. When Nathan returned to the bus stop, he saw his brother dead.

== Case and trial ==
From the start of the trial, there was hesitation to admit that the crime was racially motivated. The police and the CPS (Crown Prosecution Service) instead determined that the crime was a battle over gang territory. Nathan and Rolan were not seen as victims but identified as guilty parties by the police, because of the racist stereotype that "Black boys cannot be innocent." As a result of this harmful generalisation, Nathan was treated poorly by the authorities. Although he was also attacked, none of the gang members was prosecuted for assaulting him. Eight of the youths who participated in the murder were arrested on charges of violent disorder. Only Mark Thornborrow stood trial, was charged, and convicted of murder. The sentencing judge, Kenneth Richardson, eventually concluded that the murder was racially motivated and sentenced Thornborrow accordingly.

== Adams family response ==
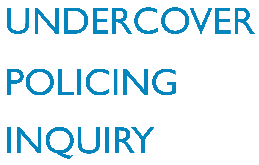
Logo for the Undercover Policing Inquiry that Rolan Adam's parents and siblings were involved in. They were one of many families of crime victims that claimed they were put under surveillance by the British police following Rolan's murder.

Rolan's family stated that local officials and authorities displayed a lack of support following his murder. They received threatening phone calls from people gloating about Rolan's death and a letter with the message, 'glad a nigger is dead.' The harassment of the Adams and their friends and family was getting extreme, and there was an absence of any police protection. Eventually, the local authorities and the local Commission for Racial Equality advised them that they were in danger. That night, three months following the murder, they left their home. The Adams family also claimed to have been under surveillance by the police. Richard, Audrey, and Nathan Adams were all later involved with the Undercover Policing Inquiry. This effort against the High Court of England aimed to bring to light and seek justice for the fact that the British police were spying on victims of crime and their families. Audrey Adams, in one interview, described their experience and the way they were treated as "horrific."

As a result of the injustices they experienced, Rolan's mother and father, Richard and Audrey, and extended family and friends, created the Rolan Adams Family Campaign to ensure justice. This grew over the years and extended support to other victims of racist violence and racism. Moreover, it contributed to shutting down the British National Party's headquarters in Welling. Police were hostile to the campaign, and stopped friends and family from visiting the Adams for months. Despite opposition and in an effort to keep Rolan's memory alive, a tradition of holding a candlelit vigil where Rolan was murdered on the anniversary of his death was established by his family. Individuals would pray silently and lay wreaths in Rolan's memory. However, this ended in 2001 when the mourners were harassed. Spectators sounded their car horns, and one individual threw a McDonald's milkshake at them as they were standing silently.

== Societal outcomes and related incidents ==
The black American activist Reverend Al Sharpton came to London to hold a meeting in support of the Adams family. However, the BNP used the situation to their advantage, marched through Thamesmead, and attacked the meeting. Sharpton's efforts were met with mixed responses from local black rights activists, but brought more media attention to Rolan's murder.

The UK Parliament responded later to the murder by bringing up a motion on his behalf on 16 February 1993. This was an effort to send condolences to his family and to start a discussion concerning a memorial to victims of racial violence. No amendments were officially submitted as a result.

Other racially motivated murders of youth in south-east London during this period drew comparisons from the public to Rolan's murder. In July 1992, Rohit Duggal, a 16-year-old British Asian boy, was stabbed to death outside a kebab shop on Well Hall Road by a white youth; the attack was believed to be racially motivated and triggered protests in the area against the British National Party. The death of another black youth, Stephen Lawrence, happened on 22 April 1993. He and his friend, Duwayne Brooks, were together that afternoon and were headed home. They arrived at the bus stop in Well Hall Road at about 10:30 pm. Stephen went to check to see if the bus was coming, and he was in a position where he was standing in the middle of the entrance of Dickson Road. Duwayne was standing between Dickson Road and the roundabout when he saw a group of five or six white youths. He asked Stephen if he saw the bus coming. One of the white youths heard something Duwayne said and shouted, 'what, what nigger?' The group then proceeded to run towards Duwayne and Stephen. At this time, either one or more of the white youths stabbed Stephen twice. Durwayne called out to Stephen to run and follow him. He ran towards Shooter's Hill and Stephen managed to get on his feet and run over one hundred yards to the point where he collapsed. Stephen had stab wounds on both sides of his body, on the chest and arm, to a depth of about five inches. Both stab wounds had severed axillary arteries. His death had several similarities to Rolan's but was more widely publicised.
