= Brimson =

Brimson may refer to:

- Brimson, Missouri
- Brimson, Minnesota
- Brimson (surname)
