= Murder of Rohit Duggal =

1992 murder in England

Rohit Duggal (21 May 1976 – 11 July 1992) was a 16-year-old British Asian boy murdered in July 1992 in Eltham, south-east London. Peter Thompson, a 17-year-old white boy, was sentenced to life imprisonment for his murder. The event was widely described as a racist hate crime and led to protests against the British National Party. Duggal's murder has been compared to and linked to those of Rolan Adams and Stephen Lawrence, both Black British teenagers murdered in south-east London in racially motivated crimes in the early 1990s.

== Biography ==
Rohit Duggal was of Indian descent, but was born and raised in Britain. According to an interview with his uncle, Duggal was an only son and he was brought up by his mother, while his father left the family while he was young. He was described as a 'keen cricketer' who hoped to play for Kent. Duggal attended Chislehurst and Sidcup Grammar School, which was predominantly white. He had passed his GCSEs shortly before his murder.

== Murder ==
On 11 July 1992, Duggal was returning home from a party accompanied by a group of white male and female friends. He and his friends stopped at a kebab shop on Well Hall Road in Eltham to order chips and ask for directions to a taxi stand. A group of white youths, described as a gang, began to harass Duggal as he and his friends left the shop. Duggal's group was blocked by traffic from crossing the street; Duggal attempted to calm the situation and then ran across the road when one of the gang members brandished a knife. Duggal was pursued, accosted and stabbed through the heart. He died shortly after.

== Trial and reaction ==
Only one person, Peter Thompson, was ever tried, despite reports that a second associate had also pursued Duggal. Thompson was found guilty and sentenced to life in 1993.

The killing was described as motiveless by Metropolitan Police. However, the Crown Prosecution Service named racism as a motive during the trial. According to an activist from Greenwich Action Committee Against Racist Attacks, as Duggal fled his assailants the gang members repeatedly screamed 'get the paki', and during the trial, the defendant had to be instructed to stop referring to Duggal by the same term. In addition, Duggal's memorial service was reportedly interrupted by neo-Nazis.

Though he was not known to be a member, Thompson was found to be carrying leaflets from the British National Party (BNP) at the time of his arrest. Duggal's murder was one of numerous racially motivated attacks and murders of Black and Asian people in south-east London which sparked public outrage and protests against the BNP. 18-year-old Stephen Lawrence was attacked and stabbed to death by a gang in a racial hate crime in 1993, also on Well Hall Road, only 200 yards from where Duggal was murdered. Peter Thompson was alleged to have ties to a gang run by Neil and Jamie Acourt, who were among Lawrence's accused killers. Lawrence's murder, as well as the earlier racially motivated murder of 15-year-old Rolan Adams in Thamesmead in 1991 both drew comparisons to Duggal's case by the public and the Anti-Racist Alliance, with all three cases being cited by the anti-BNP protesters.
