= Sam Smith (businesswoman) =

British business executive (born 1974)

Sam Smith (born 22 May 1974) is a British businesswoman and financier. She is the founder and chief executive of the corporate advisor and brokerage firm FinnCap, the largest broker for companies listed on London's growth stock market AIM and a top five broker for the London Stock Exchange. Smith is the first female chief executive of a City stockbroking firm.

== Early life and education ==
Smith was born and raised in Selsey, West Sussex, and attended Chislehurst and Sidcup Grammar School in Kent. She studied Economics and Accounting at the University of Bristol, graduating with a BSc in 1995.

== Career ==
After graduating, Smith joined KPMG, where she qualified as a Chartered Accountant. In 1998 she joined investment manager JM Finn to establish its corporate advisory and brokerage division.

In 2007, Smith established FinnCap and became chief executive following a 50% buyout of JM Finn Capital Markets, making Smith the only female chief executive of a City broking firm. The British venture capitalist Jon Moulton became chairman of the firm in January 2010.

The buyout was completed in April 2010 when the outstanding 50% of the company was acquired from JM Finn. FinnCap is now 95% employee-owned and offers new employees low-interest, long-dated loans to purchase shares.

The firm is now the largest broker for companies listed on the London Stock Exchange’s AIM growth market, with over 120 clients. It advised companies on raising a total of £363 million in the financial year ending 30 April 2017.

Smith was announced as a finalist for the EY Entrepreneur of the Year Awards in April 2017.

== Other activities ==
Smith is a supporter of women in business and finance; Finncap established a female founders forum in March 2017, aiming to enable more female CEOs to scale up using growth capital.

She is a former winner of the Women of the Future Award for Business, and is a patron for the Modern Muse project, a not-for-profit social enterprise designed to inspire and engage the next generation of female business leaders and entrepreneurs.
