= Badger Trust =

British animal welfare charity

- Predecessor: The National Federation of Badger Groups
- Formation: 1986
- Type: Registered Charity
- Chief Executive: Nigel Palmer
- Chair: Rosie Wood
- Website: badgertrust.org.uk

Badger Trust, formerly the National Federation of Badger Groups (NFBG), is an animal welfare charity operating in England and Wales. It represents around fifty local badger groups dedicated to the conservation and protection of the European badger. It states that it is the leading voice for badgers and that its charitable aim is to promote and enhance the welfare, conservation and protection of badgers, their setts and their habitats.

Badger Trust campaigns against badger culling in the United Kingdom. It does this through a variety of methods including reports, presentations and local activity. It has also filed legal challenges in the High Court against planned badger culls, challenging a planned cull in Wales in 2010. Badger Trust won a halt to the Welsh cull. There has never been a badger cull in Wales as a result, which means England is the only home nation to cull badgers - Scotland, Wales and Northern Ireland do not. Badger Trust has taken the UK government to international court under the Berne Convention on the Conservation of European Wildlife and Natural Habitats on animal welfare grounds and the threat of local extinction of badgers due to the high culling rate. The case is ongoing. To date, (up to January 2024), 230,000 badgers have been culled, representing around half of the badger population. In 2024 Badger Trust produced a comprehensive report on bovineTB, with input from Professor David Macdonald, outlining the lack of evidence that badgers were a primary cause.

The group has issued reports about illegal snaring and hunting of badgers in Britain. Badger Trust sees campaigning around crimes against badgers as a key area of focus and has called for increased sentences to five years, in line with crimes against domestic animals.

In August 2024 Badger Trust launched a legal case against Natural England, an organisation led by Tony Juniper, for going against its own scientific advice and licensing a badger cull in the summer of 2024 aiming to kill around 30,000 more badgers.

Badger Trust is carrying out a national survey of badger numbers, in light of the drop in population due to badger culling, "State of the Badger" Report. Trials started in 2024 in Somerset, Lancashire and Hampshire, with a planned roll out throughout England and Wales.

Local Badger Groups are the direct action side of the Badger Trust. There are around 50 local voluntary Badger Groups in England, Wales and Northern Ireland. In Scotland a similar role to Badger Trust is played by Scottish Badgers.
