= David Best (pilot) =

British Test Pilot

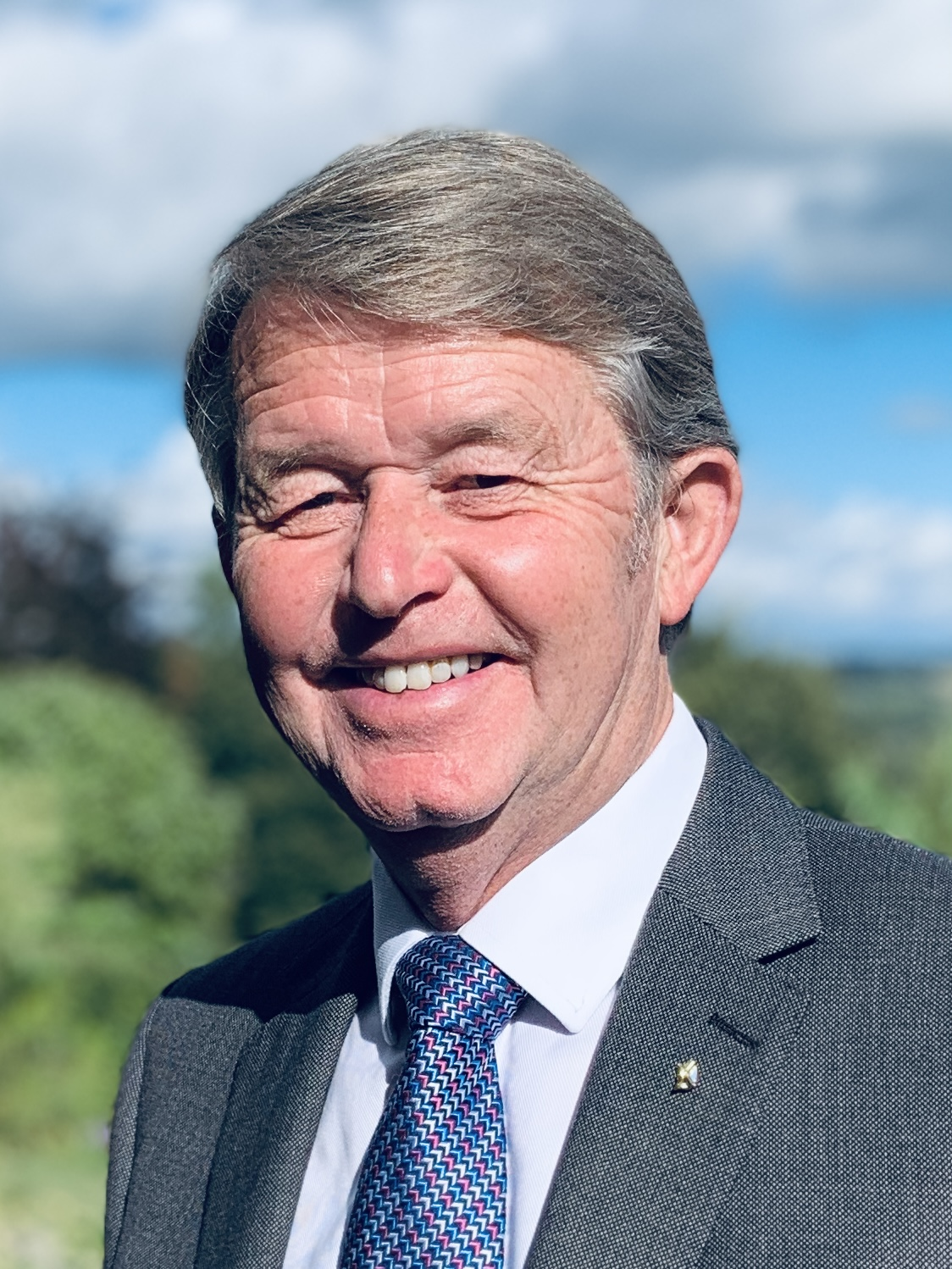
- Best in 2023
- Born: 23 December 1960 (age 65)
- Education: Bristol University
- Occupations: Test pilot Business executive
- Employer(s): SkyBoss Aerospace Ltd (founder and CEO)
- Title: Air Commodore (Retired)
- Awards: OBE Queen's Commendation for Valuable Service in the Air RP Alston Medal from the Royal Aeronautical Society Legion of Merit (United States)

Air Commodore David Best (OBE FRAeS) (born 23 December 1960) is a British test pilot and businessman. He served in the Royal Air Force from 1979 to 2012. In 2012 he co-founded Nova Systems International and in 2022 he founded SkyBoss Aerospace Ltd. He is a Fellow of both the Royal Aeronautical Society and the Society of Experimental Test Pilots.

== Early life and education ==
David Best was born on 23 December 1960 in County Durham, England and moved to South East London at age 7. He attended Chislehurst and Sidcup Grammar School where he became Head of School and he then studied physics at Bristol University, graduating in 1982. Best was a member of Bristol University Air Squadron before becoming an RAF fighter pilot. He was subsequently selected for test pilot training and attended the Empire Test Pilots ' School in 1989. In 1993 he was awarded a Queen's Commendation for Valuable Service in the Air.

== Military career ==
Best was commander of the Empire Test Pilots’ School from 1998 to 2001 and was UK MoD Chief Test Pilot from 2004 to 2007. Best was appointed Officer of the Most Excellent Order of the British Empire in 2001.

In 2010, Best was appointed as NATO's Director of Air Operations and Plans in Kabul, Afghanistan.

== Business career ==
Best became a co-founder, chief operating officer and executive director of Nova Systems International. He was also the company's chief test pilot from 2012 to 2021. In 2022, Best was awarded the RP Alston Medal from the Royal Aeronautical Society. He was cited for his “outstanding career contributions to test flying, operational military leadership and industrial entrepreneurialism including the exploitation of novel aerospace technologies in the fields of flight control, unmanned aerial systems (UAS) and Intelligence, Surveillance and Reconnaissance (ISR).” In 2022 Best founded SkyBoss Aerospace Ltd.

== Recognition ==
Best has been elected a Fellow of both the Royal Aeronautical Society and the Society of Experimental Test Pilots.
