= Badger culling in the United Kingdom =

Culling of badgers in the United Kingdom

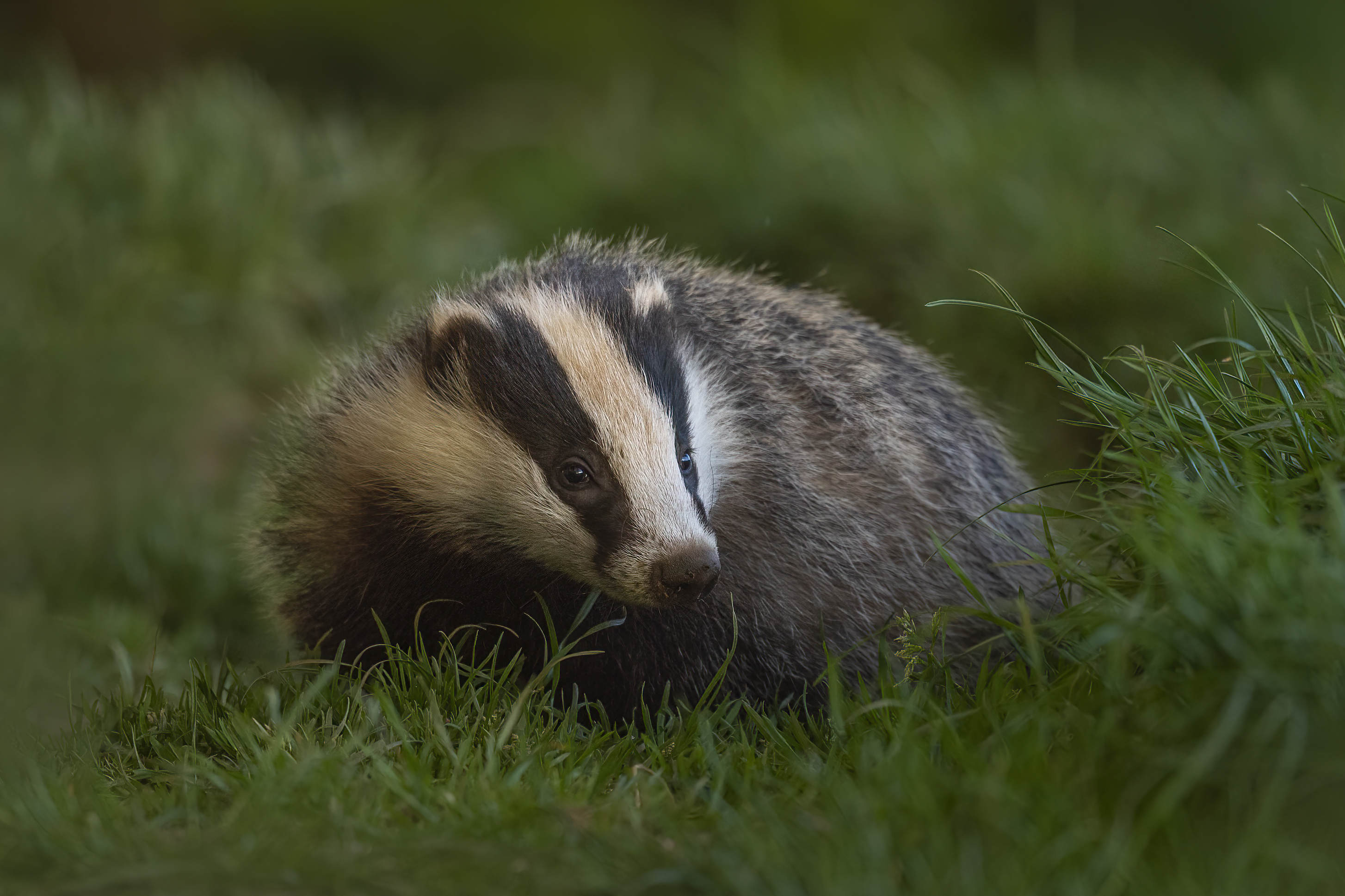
A European badger (Meles meles)

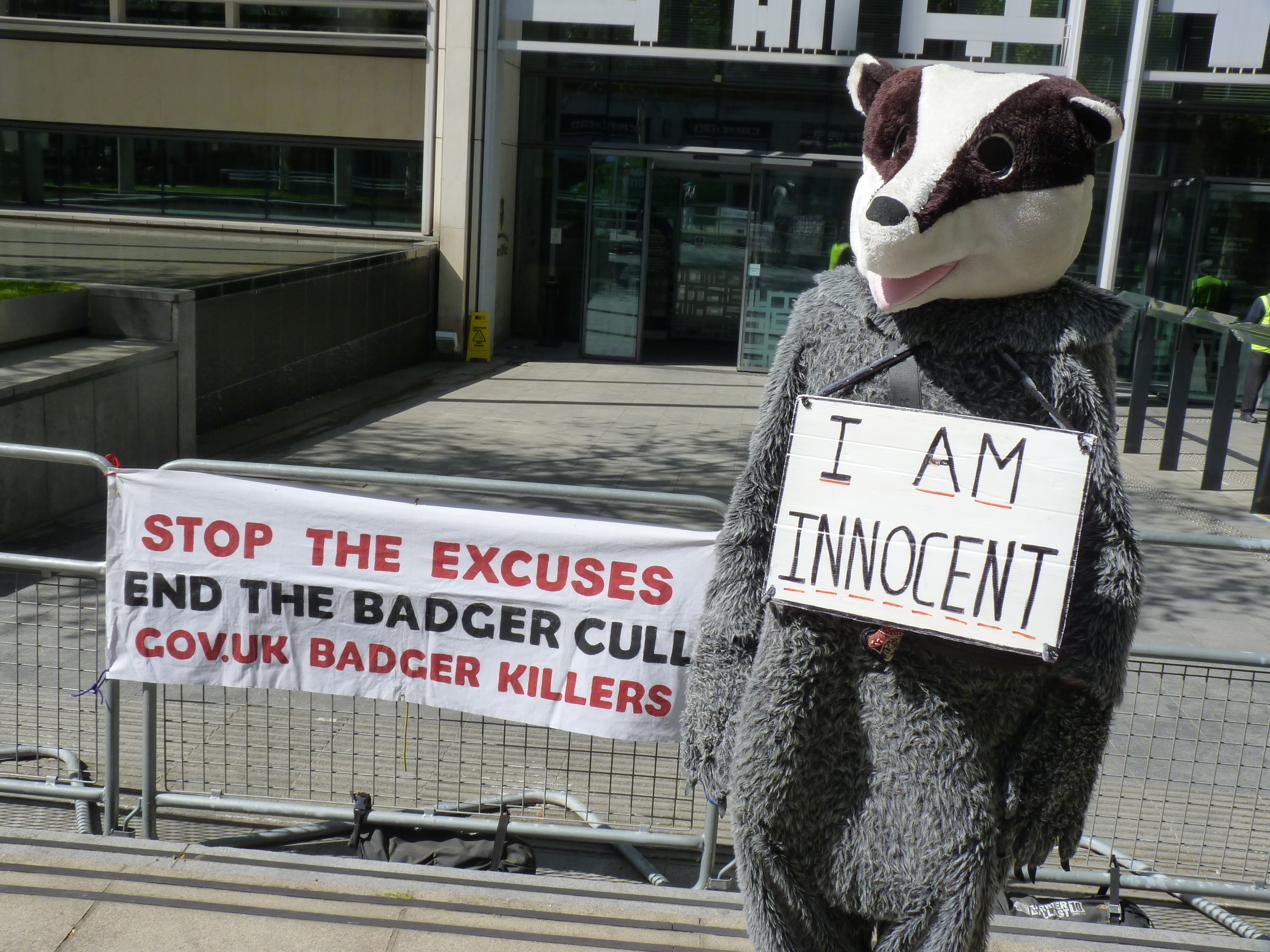
Badger protesting outside the Home Office.

Badger culling in the United Kingdom was a permitted method to reduce badger numbers in the hope of controlling the spread of bovine tuberculosis (bTB), which is caused by the Mycobacterium bovis bacteria. M. bovis is transmissible to humans, causing zoonotic tuberculosis; however, public health control measures including milk pasteurisation and the BCG vaccine reduce the level of risk to human health. The disease affects cattle and other farm animals, some species of wildlife including badgers and deer, and some domestic pets such as cats. Geographically, bTB spread from isolated pockets in the late 1980s to cover large areas of the west and south-west of England and Wales in the 2010s. Some people believed this correlated with the lack of badger control.

After 2024, no new badger culling licences were granted, with the government allowing existing licences to continue until they ran out, in favour of vaccination to stop bTB spreading. By May 2026, the only licences remaining were not in use, effectively ending the practice of badger culling in the United Kingdom.

A targeted cull in Pembrokeshire in Wales began in 2009, and was cancelled in 2012 after the Welsh Labour administration concluded that culling was ineffective. In October 2013, culling in England was tried in two pilot areas in west Gloucestershire and west Somerset. The main aim of these trials was to assess the humaneness of culling using "free shooting" (previous methods trapped the badgers in cages before shooting them). The trials were repeated in 2014 and 2015, and expanded to a larger area in later years.

Culling was intended to manage the cost of bTB both to farmers and to the taxpayer. DEFRA compensated farmers for culled cattle, paying between £82 (for a young calf) and £1,543 (for a breeding bull), with higher values for pedigree animals, ranging up to £5,267. Farmers bear other costs from a bTB outbreak on their farm, and these are mandatory and uncompensated. After compensation, a bTB outbreak costs the farmer a median £6,600.

By 2024, the United Kingdom had culled 210,000 badgers at a cost of £58.8 million. In the same period, it culled 330,000 cattle. Tuberculosis compensation paid to farmers was costing the UK taxpayer around £150 million per annum.

== Status of badgers ==
European badgers (Meles meles) are not an endangered species, but they are amongst the most legally protected wild animals in the UK, being shielded under the Protection of Badgers Act 1992, the Wildlife and Countryside Act 1981, and the Convention on the Conservation of European Wildlife and Natural Habitats.

== Early history ==
=== Before 1992 ===
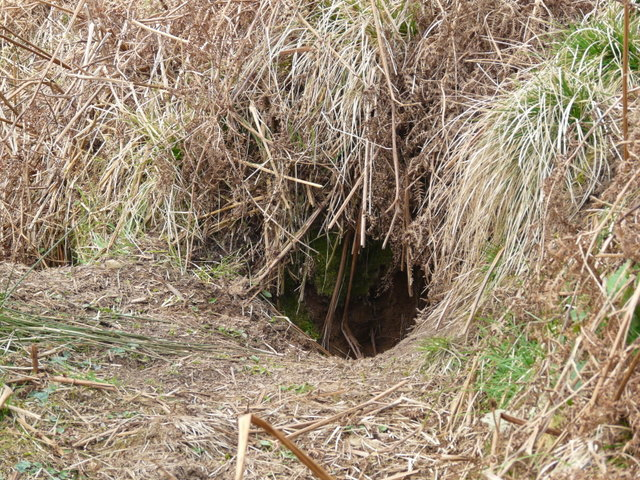
The entrance to a badger sett down which gas canisters are thrown during gassing

Many badgers in Europe were gassed during the 1960s and 1970s to control rabies. Mycobacterium bovis was discovered in 1882, but until 1960, no compulsory tests for the disease had been brought in; previously, testing was voluntary. Herds that were attested as free of bovine tuberculosis (bTb) were tested annually and received a premium of 1d per gallon for their milk. Those not tested were able to carry on trading without testing. A programme of test-and-slaughter began and was successful. Until the 1980s, badger culling in the UK was undertaken in the form of gassing. By 1960, eradicating bTb in the UK was thought possible, until 1971, when a new population of tuberculous badgers was located in Gloucestershire. Subsequent experiments showed that bTB can be spread from badgers to cattle, and some farmers tried to cull badgers on their land. Wildlife protection groups lobbied Parliament, which responded by passing the Badgers Act 1973 (c. 57), making it an offence to attempt to kill, take, or injure badgers, or interfere with their setts without a licence. These laws are now contained in the Protection of Badgers Act 1992.

=== Randomised Badger Culling Trials (1998–2008) ===
In 1997, an independent scientific body issued the Krebs Report. This concluded a lack of evidence remained about whether badger culling would help control the spread of bTB and proposed a series of trials.

The government then ordered an independently run series of trials, known as the Randomised Badger Culling Trials (RBCT). These trials, in which 11,000 badgers in selected areas were cage-trapped and killed, were conducted from 1998 to 2005, although they were briefly suspended due to the outbreak of foot-and-mouth in 2001. The incidence of bTB in and around 10 large (100 km^{2}) areas in which annual badger culling occurred was compared with the incidence in and around 10 matched areas with no such culling.

In 2003, as a result of initial findings from the RBCT, the reactive component of the culling where badgers were culled in and around farms where bTB was present in cattle, was suspended. This was because the RBCT recorded a 27% increase in bTB outbreaks in these areas of the trial compared to areas in which no culling took place. The advisory group of the trials concluded that reactive culling could not be used to control bTB.

In December 2005, a preliminary analysis of the RBCT data showed that proactive culling, in which most badgers in a particular area were culled, reduced the incidence of bTB by 19% within the cull area, but it increased by 29% within 2 km outside the cull area. The report, therefore, warned of a "perturbation effect" in which culling leads to changes in badger behaviour thereby increasing infections within the badger colonies and the migration of infected badgers to previously uninfected areas. Whilst culling produced a decreased badger population locally, it disrupted the badgers' territorial system, causing any surviving badgers to range more widely, which itself led to a substantial increase in the incidence of the disease, and its wider dispersal. It also reported that a culling policy "would incur costs that were between four and five times higher than the economic benefits gained" and "if the predicted detrimental effects in the surrounding areas are included, the overall benefits achieved would fall to approximately one-fortieth of the costs incurred". In summary, the report argued that it would be more cost effective to improve cattle control measures, with zoning and supervision of herds, than it would be to cull badgers.

In 2007, the final results of the trials, conducted by the Independent Scientific Group on Cattle TB, were submitted to David Miliband, the then Secretary of State for Environment, Food and Rural Affairs. The report stated that "badger culling can make no meaningful contribution to cattle bTB control in Britain. Indeed, some policies under consideration are likely to make matters worse rather than better". According to the report:

Detailed evaluation of RBCT and other scientific data highlight the limitations of badger culling as a control measure for cattle TB. The overall benefits of proactive culling were modest (representing an estimated 14 breakdowns prevented after culling 1,000 km^{2} for five years), and were realised only after coordinated and sustained effort. While many other approaches to culling can be considered, available data suggest that none is likely to generate benefits substantially greater than those recorded in the RBCT, and many are likely to cause detrimental effects. Given its high costs and low benefits, we therefore conclude that badger culling is unlikely to contribute usefully to the control of cattle TB in Britain, and recommend that TB control efforts focus on measures other than badger culling.

In October 2007, after considering the report and consulting other advisors, the government's then-chief scientific advisor, Professor Sir David King, produced a report of his own, which concluded that culling could indeed make a useful contribution to controlling bTB. This was criticised by scientists, most notably in the editorial of Nature, which implied King was being influenced by politics.

In July 2008, Hilary Benn, the then-Secretary of State for Environment, Food and Rural Affairs, refused to authorise a badger cull because of the practicalities and cost of a cull and the scale and length of time required to implement it, with no guarantee of success and the potential for making the disease worse. Benn went on to highlight other measures that would be taken, including allocating £20M to the development of an effective injectable bTB vaccine for both cattle and badgers, and an oral badger vaccine.

==== Follow-up reports ====
In 2010, a scientific report was published in which bTB incidence in cattle was monitored in and around RBCT areas after culling ended. The report showed that the benefits inside culled areas decreased over time and were no longer detectable three years after culling ceased. In areas adjoining those which culled, a trend indicated beneficial effects immediately after the end of culling were insignificant, and had disappeared 18 months after the cull ceased. The financial costs of culling an idealized 150 km^{2} area would exceed the savings achieved through reduced bTB by factors of 2.0 to 3.5. The report concluded: "These results, combined with evaluation of alternative culling methods, suggest that badger culling is unlikely to contribute effectively to the control of cattle [bTB] in Britain."

In 2024 and 2025 two papers cast doubt on the RBCT's findings. Re-analysis of the RBCT data found insufficient evidence that culling of badgers had any effect on the incidence of bovine tuberculosis in cattle.

=== The Bovine TB Eradication Group for England (2008) ===
In November 2008, the Bovine TB Eradication Group for England was set up. This group included DEFRA officials, members from the veterinary profession and farming industry representatives. Based on research published up to February 2010, the Group concluded that the benefits of the cull were not sustained beyond the culling and that it was ineffective method of controlling bTB in Britain. They said:

Our findings show that the reductions in cattle TB incidence achieved by repeated badger culling were not sustained in the long term after culling ended and did not offset the financial costs of culling. These results, combined with evaluation of alternative culling methods, suggest that badger culling is unlikely to contribute effectively to the control of cattle TB in Britain.

=== In Wales ===
In 2009, the Welsh Assembly authorised a nonselective badger cull in the Tuberculosis Eradication (Wales) Order 2009; the Badger Trust sought a judicial review of the decision, but their application was denied. The Badger Trust appealed in Badger Trust v Welsh Ministers [2010] EWCA Civ 807; the Court of Appeal ruled that the 2009 Order should be quashed. The Welsh Assembly replaced proposals for a cull in 2011 with a five-year vaccination programme following a review of the science.

== Post-2010 history ==
After the 2010 general election, the new Welsh environment minister, John Griffiths, ordered a review of the scientific evidence in favour of and against a cull. The incoming DEFRA Secretary of State, Caroline Spelman, began her Bovine TB Eradication Programme for England, which she described as "a science-led cull of badgers in the worst-affected areas". The Badger Trust put it differently, saying, "badgers are to be used as target practice". Shadow Environment Secretary Mary Creagh said it was prompted by "short-term political calculation".

As an attempt to reduce the economic costs of live cage-trapping followed by shooting used in the RBCT, the post-2010 culls in England also allowed for the first time, "free shooting", i.e. shooting free-roaming badgers with firearms. Licences to cull badgers under the Protection of Badgers Act 1992 are available from Natural England, which require applicants to show that they have the skills, training, and resources to cull in an efficient, humane, and effective way, and to provide a Badger Control Plan. This meant that farmers were allowed to shoot the badgers themselves, or to employ suitably qualified persons to do this. The actual killing of the badgers was funded by the farmers, whereas the monitoring and data analysis were funded by DEFRA.

The Badger Trust brought court action against the government. On 12 July 2012, their case was dismissed in the High Court; the trust appealed unsuccessfully. Meanwhile, the Humane Society International pursued a parallel case through the European Courts, which was also unsuccessful. Rural Economy and Land Use Programme fellow Angela Cassidy has identified one of the major forces underlying the opposition to badger culls as originating in the historically positive fictional depictions of badgers in British literature. Cassidy further noted that modern negative depictions have recently seen a resurgence.

In August 2015, culling was announced to be rolled out in Dorset, with a target of 615 to 835 badgers being culled there, while also being continued in Gloucestershire and Somerset. Licences were granted to allow six weeks of continuous culling in the three counties until 31 January. In December 2015, Defra released documents confirming the badger cull had "met government targets" with 756 animals culled in Dorset, 432 in Gloucestershire and 279 in Somerset.

=== Aims ===
A DEFRA statement, published in October 2012, stated, "The aim of this monitoring is to test the assumption that controlled shooting is a humane culling technique." The statement makes no indication that the cull would assess the effectiveness of reducing bTB in the trial areas.

A Badger Trust statement indicated the 2012–2013 badger cull had these specific aims:

- Determine whether badger cull targets for each pilot area can be met within six weeks with at least 70% of the badger population removed in each cull area
- Determine whether shooting "free-running" badgers at night is a humane way of killing badgers.
- Determine whether shooting at night is safe with reference to the general public, pets, and livestock

Again, the statement made no indication that the cull would assess the effectiveness of reducing bTB in the trial areas.

=== Concerns regarding free shooting ===
Permission to allow free shooting for the first time during the cull of 2012–2013 raised several concerns.

- One suggested method to avoid endangering the public would be for shooters to stand over setts and shoot badgers near the entrances, but a report to DEFRA by The Game Conservancy Trust (2006) indicated that a major problem with shooting near the sett is that wounded badgers are very likely to bolt underground, preventing a second shot to ensure the animal is killed. Under these conditions, the first shot must cause the badger to collapse on the spot, limiting the choice of target sites to the spine, neck, or head.
- Colin Booty, the RSPCA's deputy head of wildlife, said: "Shooting badgers might be very different from shooting foxes, say, because their anatomy is very different. The badger has a very thick skull, thick skin, and a very thick layer of subcutaneous fat. It has a much more robust skeleton than the fox. Because of the short, squat body and the way its legs work, these legs often partly conceal the main killing zone. Free shooting carries a high risk of wounding."

=== Announcement and implementation ===
I wish there was some other practical way of dealing with this, but we can't escape the fact that the evidence supports the case for a controlled reduction of the badger population in areas worst affected by bovine TB. With the problem of TB spreading and no usable vaccine on the horizon, I'm strongly minded to allow controlled culling, carried out by groups of farmers and landowners, as part of a science-led and carefully managed policy of badger control.

— Caroline Spelman

On 19 July 2011, Caroline Spelman, then the Secretary of State for Environment, Food and Rural Affairs, announced the government response to the consultation. It was proposed that a cull would be conducted within the framework of the new "Bovine TB Eradication Programme for England". In view of concerns in response to the initial consultation, a further consultation would determine whether a cull could be effectively enforced and monitored by Natural England under the Protection of Badgers Act 1992. The cull would initially be piloted in two areas, before being extended to other parts of the country.

In December 2011, the government announced that it intended to go forward with trial badger culls in two 150 km^{2} areas. These would take place over a 6-week period with the aim of reducing the badger population by 70% in each area. Farmers and land owners would be licensed to control badgers by shooting and would bear the costs of any culls. The government was to bear the costs of licensing and monitoring the culls. The government would monitor:

- Actions taken under the licence
- The impact on cattle herd breakdowns (becoming infected with bTB) within the areas culled or vaccinated
- Humaneness of the culling methods
- Impacts on the remaining badger population

In March 2012, the government appointed members to an independent panel of experts (IPE) to oversee the monitoring and evaluation of the pilot areas and report back. The panel's role was to evaluate the effectiveness, humaneness, and safety of the controlled shooting method, not the effectiveness of badger culling to control bTB in cattle.

The cull was to begin in 2012 led by DEFRA. However, the Secretary of State for Environment, Owen Paterson, announced in a statement to Parliament on 23 October 2012 that a cull would be postponed until 2013 with a wide range of reasons given.

On 27 August 2013, a full culling programme began in two pilot areas, one mainly in West Somerset and the other mainly in West Gloucestershire with a part in Southeast Herefordshire, at an estimated cost of £7 million per trial area. Up to 5,094 badgers were to be shot. There were closed seasons during the cull, designed to prevent distress to animals or their dependent offspring.

In 2014, the policing costs in Gloucestershire were £1.7 million over the seven-week period (£1,800 per badger) and in Somerset, the cost of policing amounted to £739,000 for the period.

=== Data collected ===
Shooters failed to kill the target of 70% of badgers in both trial areas during the initial 6-week cull. During this time, 850 badgers were killed in Somerset and 708 in Gloucestershire. Of the badgers culled in Gloucestershire, 543 were killed through free shooting, whilst 165 were cage-trapped and shot. In Somerset, 360 badgers were killed by free shooting and 490 by being cage-trapped then shot.

Because the target of 70% badgers to be culled had not been achieved, the cull period was extended. During the 3-week extension in Somerset, an extra 90 badgers were culled, taking the total across the whole cull period to 940, representing a 65% reduction in the estimated badger population. During the 5 week and 3 day extension in Gloucestershire, 213 further badgers were culled, giving an overall total of 921, representing a reduction of just under 40% in the estimated badger population.

DEFRA and Natural England were unwilling to divulge what data would be collected and the methods of collection during the pilot culls. In a decision under the Freedom of information in the United Kingdom act dated 6 August 2013, though, the Information Commissioner's Office found that DEFRA was wrong to apply the Environmental Information Regulations in defence of its refusal to disclose information about the pilot cull methods. DEFRA originally intended to sample 240 badgers killed during the pilot culls, but confirmed only 120 badgers targeted were to be collected for examination of humaneness, and that half of these badgers would be shot while caged. Therefore, only 1.1% of badgers killed by free shooting were tested for humaneness of shooting. No badgers were to be tested for bTB.

Details of the ongoing pilot culls were not released whilst they were being conducted, and DEFRA declined to divulge how the success of the trials would be measured. As a result, scientists, the RSPCA, and other animal charities called for greater transparency over the pilot badger culls. Environment Secretary Owen Paterson confirmed that the purpose of the pilot culls was to assess whether farmer-led culls deploying controlled shooting of badgers is suitable to be rolled-out to up to 40 new areas over the next four years. Farming Minister David Heath admitted in correspondence with Lord Krebs that the cull would "not be able to statistically determine either the effectiveness (in terms of badgers removed) or humaneness of controlled shooting". Lord Krebs, who led the RBCT in the 1990s, said the two pilots "will not yield any useful information".

In explaining why the culling had missed the target, Environment Secretary Paterson famously commented, "the badgers moved the goalposts."

=== Efficacy ===
DEFRA has said it wishes its policy for controlling TB in cattle to be science-led. A substantial body of scientific evidence indicates that culling badgers will not be an effective or cost-effective policy.

The best informed independent scientific experts agree that culling on a large, long-term, scale will yield modest benefits, and that it is likely to make things worse before they get better. It will also make things worse for farmers bordering on the cull areas.

— Lord Krebs, architect of the original Randomised Badger Culling Trials.

Leaks reported by the BBC in February 2014 indicated that the expert panel found that less than half of all badgers were killed in both trial areas. It was also revealed that between 6.8 and 18% of badgers took more than five minutes to die; the standard originally set was that this should be less than 5%.

As culling was not selective, it was suggested that as many as six out of seven badgers killed could have been perfectly healthy and bTB free.

Scientific experts agree that culling where "hard boundaries" exist to the cull zones, on a large and long-term scale, could yield modest benefits. If "soft boundaries" allow badgers to escape, then it will also make things worse for farmers bordering on the cull areas due to infected badgers dispersing - the so-called "perturbation" effect.

The Food and Environment Research Agency (FERA) concluded, "the form and duration of badger social perturbation is still poorly understood and significant changes to our assumption may alter the order of preference [of the proposed options]." The DEFRA-commissioned FERA Report states: "Our modelling has shown that while the differences between the outcomes of strategies using only culling and culling or vaccinating badgers are quite modest (~about 15–40 CHBs prevented over 10 years), their risk profile is markedly different. Culling results in the known hazard of perturbation, leading to increased CHBs [Cattle Herd Breakdowns] in the periphery of the culling area. Culling also risks being ineffective or making the disease situation worse, if it is conducted partially (because of low compliance) or ineffectually (because of disruption or poor co-ordination) or it is stopped early (because of licensing issues). Vaccination carries no comparable risks or hazards."

The UK government stated that a sustained cull, conducted over a wide area in a co-ordinated and efficient manner, over a period of nine years, might achieve a 9–16% reduction in disease incidence, though many scientists and a coalition of animal-welfare and conservation groups, including the RSPCA, the Wildlife Trusts, and the RSPB, argue that a cull could risk local extermination of all badgers, and that a badger cull will not in any way solve the problem of bTB in cattle. The British Veterinary Association say that data collected from research in other countries suggest that the control of the disease in farms has only been successfully carried out by dealing with both cattle and wild reservoirs of infection. In the introduction to the Final Report on the RBCT, the chairman of the Independent Scientific Group, John Bourne, states: "Scientific findings indicate that the rising incidence of disease can be reversed, and geographical spread contained, by the rigid application of cattle-based control measures alone". In practice it is very difficult to quantify the contribution any wildlife reservoir has to the spread of bovine tuberculosis, since culling is usually carried out alongside cattle control measures (using "all the tools in the tool box" approach):

"From Australian experience, government has learnt that elimination of a wildlife host (feral water buffalo) needs to be followed by a long and extensive programme of cattle testing, slaughter, movement control, and public awareness campaigns before bTB is eventually eradicated. And from New Zealand experience, population reduction of the wildlife host (possums) does not by itself reliably control bTB in cattle. In both Australia and New Zealand, government was dealing with feral reservoirs of bTB rather than indigenous wildlife species, as is the case with the badger in this country" Wilsmore, A.J. and Taylor, N. M. (2005).

Bourne has also argued that the planned cull is likely only to increase the incidence of bTB, and that emphasis should instead be much greater on cattle farming controls. He claims, "the cattle controls in operation at the moment are totally ineffective", partly because the tuberculin test used in cattle is not accurate, causing tests in herds to often show negative results even while still harbouring the disease. Referring to the group's final report, he further argues that whilst cattle can get tuberculosis from badgers, the true problem is the other way around: "Badger infections are following, not leading, [bTB] infections in cattle". Overall, he says, the cull will only do more harm than good, because, "you just chase the badgers around, which makes [bTB] worse".

The amount of money that has been spent so far on planning and preparing for each pilot cull and who exactly is paying for what, i.e. what taxpayers are paying for and what the farming industry is paying for, is unclear. Costs of the culls have not factored in socioeconomic costs, such as tourism and any potential boycotts of dairy products from the cull zones. Others opposed to the cull argue that for economic reasons, the government have chosen the most inhumane approach to disease eradication. Tony Dean, chairperson of the Gloucestershire Badger Group, warns that some badgers will not be killed outright: "You have got to be a good marksman to kill a badger outright, with one shot... Many of the badgers will be badly injured. They will go back underground after being shot, probably badly maimed. They will die a long, lingering death underground from lead poisoning, etc. We are going to have a lot of cubs left underground where their mothers have been shot above ground." He also suggests that domestic pets will be at risk in the cull areas, as some farmers will mistake black and white cats and dogs for badgers.

Many cull opponents cite vaccination of badgers and cattle as a better alternative to culling. In Wales, where a policy of vaccination in 2013 was into its second year, Stephen James, who is the National Farmers Union Cymru's spokesperson on the matter, argues that the economics of badger culling are "ridiculous", saying the cost per badger was £620. "That's a very expensive way of trying to control this disease when we know full well, from experience from other countries, that there are cheaper ways of doing it...if you vaccinate in the clean areas, around the edges of the endemic areas, then there's a better chance of it working."

The Badger Trust national charity believes that vaccination will also be more likely to help eradicate the disease. Referring to further studies by Animal Health and Veterinary Laboratories Agency and the FERA, the group claims that vaccination reduces the risk of unvaccinated badger cubs testing tuberculosis positive, because "by the time cubs emerge and are available for vaccination, they might have already been exposed [and are therefore resistant] to [bTB]". Steve Clark, a director of the group, has separately said that "vaccination also reduces the bacilli that are excreted by infected badgers. It doesn't cure them, but it reduces the possibility of any further infection...in the region of a 75% level of protection. The lifespan of a badger is about five years. So if you continue the vaccination project for five years, then the majority of animals that were there at the beginning will have died out and that vaccination programme is leading towards a clean and healthy badger population."

According to Dr Robbie McDonald, head of wildlife and emerging Ddiseases at FERA (the lead wildlife scientist for DEFRA and responsible for research on badgers) the benefit of culling a population is outweighed by the detrimental effect on neighbouring populations of badgers. He is reported as saying that a huge number of badgers would have to be killed to make a difference and while it is cheap and easy to exterminate animals in the early days of a cull, it gets harder and more expensive as time goes on.

A DEFRA-funded statistical analysis from 2013 to 2017 has shown reduced incidence of farms affected by bTB of 66% in Gloucestershire and 37% in Somerset. After two years of culling in Dorset, no change in incidence was observed. An independent analysis of the data by comparing areas where culling had taken place to areas where the cull had yet to be implemented strongly suggested that the culling of badgers was having no effect on the incidence of bovine tuberculosis in cattle

=== The 2014–15 cull (England) ===
On 3 April 2014, Owen Paterson decided to continue the culling trials in 2014, in the same areas of Gloucestershire and Somerset as the 2012–2013 cull. On 20 May 2014, the Badger Trust applied for a judicial review of this policy in the High Court, claiming that Paterson unlawfully failed to put into place an independent expert panel to oversee the process.

In response to a Freedom of Information Act request submitted by the Humane Society International (HSI) UK, DEFRA said that for nearly a year, it had been conducting initial investigations into carbon monoxide gas dispersal in badger sett-like structures. No live badgers have been gassed. HSI expressed concerns about the extent to which gassing causes animal suffering.

In September 2014, a second year of badger culling began in Gloucestershire and Somerset as during 2013–2014. The cull had previously been stated to be extended to a further 10 areas. The Badger Trust claimed at the High Court that this cull would take place without independent monitoring, but DEFRA has denied this, saying experts from Natural England and the Animal Health Veterinary Laboratory Agency will be monitoring the cull. In June 2015, the National Trust, one of the largest landowners in the UK, stated it would not be allowing badger cullers onto their land until the results of all 4 years of pilot trials were known.

The 2014–2015 cull targets had been lowered to 316 badgers in Somerset and 615 in Gloucestershire. Overall, the aim was for a reduction of 70% in badger populations over the successive culls. This was to be achieved with an emphasis on trapping badgers in cages and shooting them at dawn, rather than "free shooting".

==== Response ====
As in the 2013–2014 cull, hundreds of protesters entered the culling areas to disrupt the badgers causing them to remain down their setts and avoiding being trapped, shot, or both, or to look for injured badgers. On 9 September 2014, two saboteurs in Gloucestershire found a badger trapped in a cage with cullers nearby. The police were called and the saboteurs pointed out that under government guidelines, trapped badgers should be released if a risk of interference from a third party existed. The saboteur organisation, "Stop the Cull" said police "did the right thing" and freed the badger. Gloucestershire police confirmed the standoff, which it said was resolved peacefully – adding the decision to release the badger was made by a contractor working for the cull operator.

Brian May, guitarist with the rock band Queen, is a critic of badger culling in the UK. He has called for the 2014–2015 cull to be cancelled. "It's almost beyond belief that the government is blundering ahead with a second year of inept and barbaric badger killing," he said.

Organisations involved in protesting the cull include:

- Team Badger: representing 25 different organisations
- Gloucestershire Against the Badger Shooting

In the 2013–2014 cull, police from forces including Sussex, Warwickshire, Cornwall, and the Metropolitan Police were brought in to help with policing, but the police have that in the 2014–2015 cull, the focus will be on more community policing with local officers on patrol. "It will be very focused on Gloucestershire officers dealing will local issues."

== End of badger culling ==
On 26 June 2024, Steve Reed (Shadow Secretary of State for Environment, Food and Rural Affairs) said the Labour Party would no longer be looking to end the badger cull immediately if they win the upcoming general election. Instead, they would allow existing licences to run until they expire. This sparked criticism from environmental groups who have suggested this would need to be subject to judicial review, as the Labour party had labelled the badger cull as "ineffective" in combatting bTB in their manifesto, thereby potentially contradicting the Protection of Badgers Act 1992 by allowing the culling of a protected species without acknowledging any effectiveness in disease control.

The final badger culling license was issued in 2024 to a culler in Cumbria in the northwest of England. By May 2026, the only licenses left were not intended to be used, thus meaning no more badger culling was ongoing in the United Kingdom, with the practice to officially end upon the expiry of the last contract in 2028. However, the Badger Trust expressed concern that remaining contracts could be—and were being—used to continue culling badgers.

== Arguments for culling ==
Prior to the 2012–2013 badger cull, the government's Department for Environment, Food and Rural Affairs (DEFRA) stated that badger control was needed because "...we still need to tackle [bTB] in order to support high standards of animal health and welfare, to promote sustainable beef and dairy sectors, to meet EU legal and trade requirements and to reduce the cost and burden on farmers and taxpayers." This report listed these reasons for bTB control:-

- Protect the health of the public and maintain public confidence in the safety of products entering the food chain
- Protect and promote the health and welfare of some animals
- Meet UK international (in particular EU) and domestic legal commitments and maintain the UK's reputation for safe and high quality food
- Maintain productive and sustainable beef and dairy sectors in England, securing opportunities for international trade and minimising environmental impacts
- Reduce the cost of bTB to farmers and taxpayers

=== Disease ===
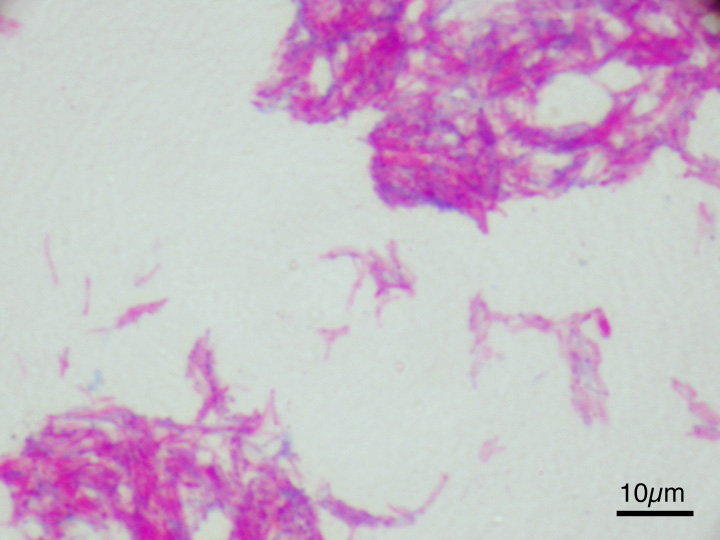
Mycobacterium bovis

Humans can be infected with the Mycobacterium bovis bacterium, which causes bTb. Between 1994 and 2011, 570 human cases of bTb were reported in humans. Most of these cases are thought to be in older people who could have been infected before milk pasteurisation became common in the UK.

One route of transmission to humans is drinking infected, unpasteurised milk (pasteurisation kills the bacterium). European badgers can be infected and transmit the disease to cattle, thereby posing a risk to the human food chain. Culling is used in parts of the UK to reduce the number of badgers and thereby reduce the incidence and spread of bTB that might infect humans.

bTB spreads through exhalations and excretions of infected individuals. Modern cattle housing, which has good ventilation, reduces transmission, but in older-style cattle housing or in badger setts, the disease can spread rapidly. Badgers range long distances at night, potentially spreading bTB widely. Badgers mark their territory with urine, which can contain a high proportion of bTB bacteria. According to the RSPCA, the infection rate among badgers is 4–6%.

bTB is mostly concentrated in the west and south-west of England and eastern Wales. It is thought to have re-emerged because of the 2001 foot-and-mouth disease outbreak, which led to thousands of cattle being slaughtered and farmers all over the UK having to buy new stock. Apparently, undiscovered bTB remained in some of these replacement animals.

Action on eradicating bTB is a devolved issue. DEFRA works with the Devolved Administrations in Wales, Scotland and Northern Ireland for coherent and joined-up policies for the UK as a whole. The Chief Veterinary Officers and lead bTB policy officials from each country meet on a monthly basis to discuss bTB issues through the UK bTB Liaison Group.

==== Cost ====
Culling is intended to manage the cost of bTB, both to farmers and to the taxpayer. DEFRA compensates farmers for culled cattle, paying between £82 (for a young calf) and £1,543 (for a breeding bull), with higher values for pedigree animals, ranging up to £5,267. Farmers bear other costs from a bTB outbreak on their farm, and these are mandatory and uncompensated. A bTB outbreak costs the farmer a median £6,600.

As of 2024, the United Kingdom has culled 210,000 badgers at a cost of £58.8 million. In the same period, it culled 330,000 cattle. Bovine TB compensation paid to farmers costs the UK taxpayer around £150 million per annum.

== Arguments against culling ==
The risk of humans contracting bTB from milk is extremely low if certain precautions are taken, and scientists have argued that badger culling is unnecessary. The low risk is accepted by DEFRA, which wrote in a report published in 2011: "The risk to public health is very low these days, largely thanks to milk pasteurisation and the [bTB] surveillance and control programme in cattle".

Animal welfare groups such as the Badger Trust and the Royal Society for the Prevention of Cruelty to Animals are opposed to what they consider random slaughter of badgers — which have special legal protection in the UK — in return for what they describe as a relatively small impact on bTB.

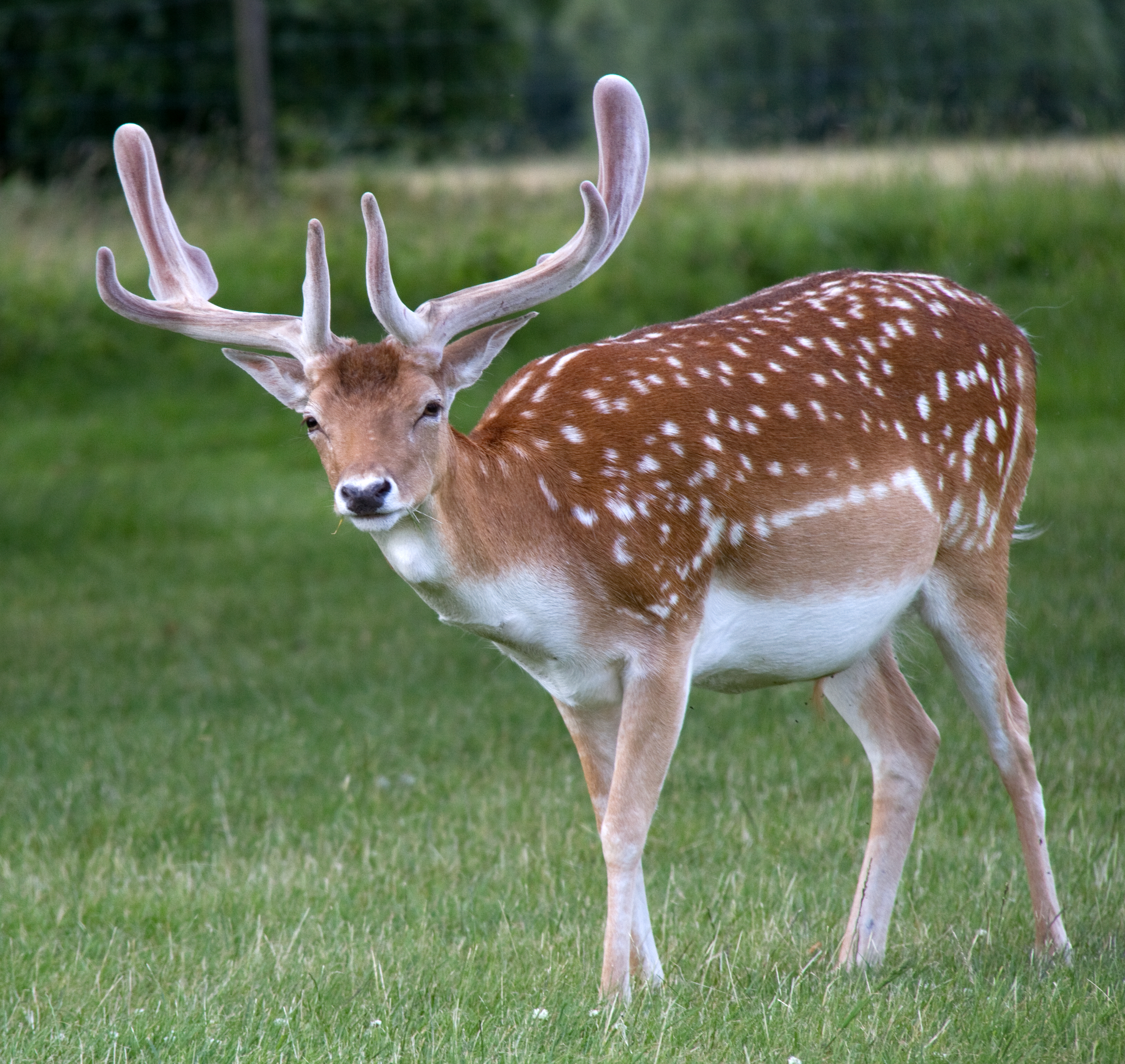
Fallow deer (Dama dama) are also carriers of bTB.

Cattle and badgers are not the only carriers of bTB. The disease can infect and be transmitted by domestic animals such as cats and dogs, wildlife such as deer, and farm livestock such as horses and goats. Although the frequency of infection from other mammals is generally much less than in cattle and badgers, other species of wildlife have been shown as a possible carriers of bTB. In some areas of south-west England, deer, especially fallow deer due to their gregarious behaviour, have been implicated as a possible maintenance host for transmission of bTB. In some localised areas, the risk of transmission to cattle from fallow deer arguably is greater than it is from badgers. M. bovis was shown to be hosted and transmitted to humans by cats in March 2014 when Public Health England announced two people in England developed bTB infections after contact with a domestic cat. The two human cases were linked to 9 cases of bTB infection in cats in Berkshire and Hampshire during 2013. These are the first documented cases of cat-to-human TB transmission.

Research reported in 2016 indicates that bTB is not transmitted by direct contact between badgers and cattle, but through contaminated pasture and dung. This has important implications for farm practices such as the spreading of slurry. Using a GPS collar small enough to be worn by badgers, the researchers tracked more than 400 cattle when they were in the territories of 100 badgers. In 65,000 observations, only once did a badger get within 10 m (33 ft) of a cow; the badgers preferred to be 50 m away. Experts were quoted as saying expansion of the cull "flies in the face of scientific evidence" and that the cull is a "monstrous" waste of time and money.

== Alternatives to culling ==
Under the Berne Convention on the Conservation of European Wildlife and Natural Habitats, the culling of badgers is only permitted as part of a bTB reduction strategy if no satisfactory alternative exists.

Widespread public support has arisen for an alternative to culling. In October 2012, MPs voted 147 in favour of a motion to stop the 2012–2013 badger cull and 28 against. The debate had been prompted by a petition on the government's e-petition website, which at the time had exceeded 150,000 signatories, and which had by June 2013 gathered around a quarter of a million signatories. By the time it closed on 7 September 2013, it had 303,929 signatures, breaking the record for the largest number of people ever to sign a government e-petition.

=== Vaccination ===
In July 2008, Hilary Benn, the then-Secretary of State for Environment, Food, and Rural Affairs, made a statement that highlighted actions other than culling, including allocating funding of £20M to the development of an effective bTB injectable vaccine for cattle and badgers, and an oral badger vaccine.

In March 2010, DEFRA licensed a vaccine for badgers, called the Badger BCG. The vaccine is only effective on animals that do not already have the disease and it can only be delivered by injection. It is available on prescription, subject to a licence to trap badgers from Natural England, but only where injections are carried out by trained vaccinators. DEFRA funded a programme of vaccinations in 2010–2011, and other organisations that have funded smaller vaccination programmes include the National Trust in Devon, the Gloucestershire Wildlife Trust, and a joint project by the National Farmers' Union and the Badger Trust.

However, in England, the government views badger vaccination as a necessary part of a package of measures for controlling bTB, because it estimates the cost of vaccination to be around £2,250 per km^{2} per year, and notes that most landowners and farmers have little interest in paying this cost themselves.

In Wales, badger vaccination is carried out in preference to culling. Whilst a field trial into the vaccination of badgers is under way in the Republic of Ireland, as yet, neither culling nor vaccination is carried out in Northern Ireland, although the Northern Ireland Assembly has carried out a review into bTB that recently recommended an immediate investigation into the viability of culling, vaccination, or both. In autumn 2009, Scotland was declared officially tuberculosis-free under EU rules, so there are no proposals to cull badgers there.

Although vaccinating cattle is a recognised method of avoiding killing wildlife, but reducing the prevalence, incidence, and spread of bTB in the cattle population, it could also reduce the severity of a herd infection, regardless of whether infection is introduced by wildlife or cattle. However, vaccination has been identified as having the following problems:

- As with all vaccines, a cattle vaccine does not guarantee that all vaccinated animals are fully protected from infection.
- Current research suggests that revaccination is likely to be necessary on an annual basis to maintain a sufficient level of protection in individual animals.
- The BCG vaccine can make cattle sensitive to the tuberculin skin test after vaccination, which means the animal may have a positive result, though it is not actually infected with M. bovis (a "false positive"). In parallel with developing the vaccine, DEFRA is developing a test to differentiate between infected and vaccinated animals (so-called "DIVA" test). This test is based on gamma interferon blood-test technology. The intention is that when necessary, it can be used alongside the tuberculin skin test to confirm whether a positive skin test is caused by infection or vaccination. This is critical because without this differentiation, the UK could not be declared officially free of bTB, which is required by a 1964 European Economic Community directive for international trade. (Note: Council Directive 64/432/EEC of 26 June 1964 on animal health problems affecting intra-Community trade in bovine animals and swine. No longer in force, Date of end of validity: 20/04/2021; Repealed and replaced by 32016R0429 ('Animal Health Law').) Given that in 2014 there is still no bTB vaccine for cattle that does not interfere with the tuberculin tests, such vaccination is prohibited under EU law. (Note: Council Directive 78/52/EEC of 13 December 1977 establishing the Community criteria for national plans for the accelerated eradication of brucellosis, tuberculosis and enzootic leukosis in cattle. No longer in force, Date of end of validity: 20/04/2021; Repealed and replaced by 32016R0429 ('Animal Health Law').)

As of 2011, DEFRA has invested around £18 million in the development of cattle vaccines and associated diagnostic tools.
