= Matthew Brimson =

English cricketer

Personal information
- Full name: Matthew Thomas Brimson
- Born: 1 December 1970 (age 55); Plumstead, London, England
- Batting: Right-handed
- Bowling: Slow left-arm orthodox

Domestic team information
- Years: Team
- Kent
- Leicestershire

Career statistics
| Competition | FC | List A |
|---|---|---|
| Matches | 66 | 45 |
| Runs scored | 459 | 40 |
| Batting average | 11.76 | 6.66 |
| 100s/50s | 0/1 | 0/0 |
| Top score | 54* | 12* |
| Balls bowled | 9018 | 1980 |
| Wickets | 124 | 49 |
| Bowling average | 32.81 | 27.08 |
| 5 wickets in innings | 3 | 0 |
| 10 wickets in match | 0 | 0 |
| Best bowling | 5/12 | 3/23 |
| Catches/stumpings | 11/0 | 10/0 |
- Source: Cricinfo, 3 December 2025

Matthew Thomas Brimson (born 1 December 1970) is a former English cricketer. Brimson, a slow left arm orthodox bowler, played first-class cricket for Leicestershire.

Born in Plumstead, Brimson was educated at Chislehurst and Sidcup Grammar School. He played briefly for the Kent Second Eleven (1990–1991) and studied at Durham University, where he represented the university side. He made 66 first-class and 45 List A appearances for Leicestershire, with best bowling figures of 5 wickets from 12 balls.

He was accused of indecent exposure for a prank in a team photograph that appeared in the 2000 edition of Wisden Cricketers' Almanack. The photo escaped the attention of editors, and Brimson avoided any punishment as he had already retired from cricket and gone into teaching by the time the incident came to light.
