= FinnCap =

British investment bank

Cavendish Financial
- Company type: Public
- Traded as: AIM: CAV
- Industry: Financial Services
- Headquarters: London, EC1A 7BL; United Kingdom
- Key people: Lisa Gordon, (Chairman); John Farrugia, (Co-CEO); Julian Morse, (Co-CEO)
- Number of employees: 195
- Website: cavendish.com

finnCap Group, comprising finnCap Capital Markets and finnCap Cavendish, is a British investment bank, financial services firm, and a corporate and institutional stockbroker, based in London. It provides strategic advisory and capital raising services, including: investment banking, equities research, institutional sales and trading, and market making. In May 2022 it acquired a 50% interest in Energise Limited a UK-based sustainability consultancy adding key ESG advisory capability to its services.

The group provides financial services in capital markets, PLC strategic advisory, debt advisory, M&A, and raises private growth capital. The company provides research on about 150 companies and makes markets in about 130 stocks, on the Alternative Investment Market, the London Stock Exchange’s junior market and the London Stock Exchange’s Main Market.

finnCap employs 149 people and is majority employee-owned. The company is led by John Farrugia, CEO and Richard Snow, CFO and the chairman is Robert Lister.

== History ==
finnCap was founded in 2007 following a 50% buyout of JM Finn's corporate advisory and broking division. The buyout was completed in May 2010 when the remaining 50% of the company was acquired from JM Finn, making the company wholly independent. At this time the company also changed its name from J. M. Finn Capital Markets Ltd to finnCap Ltd, in line with the company trading name.

In 2013, finnCap received regulatory clearance to begin market-making activity, and in 2014 became an FCA Sponsor for Main Market transactions.

In 2018 finnCap Ltd acquired Cavendish Corporate Finance LLP, a leading UK independent M&A adviser which subsequently rebranded as finnCap Cavendish, enabling the group to provide an end-to-end service offering which now includes investment banking, equities, debt advisory, public M&A, private growth and alternative capital as well as significant sector expertise.

finnCap floated on AIM in December 2018 and began trading as finnCap Group Plc.

in its financial year to 31 March 2022, finnCap was the leading NOMAD on AIM with c.120 retained clients and completed cliented transactions with an aggregate deal value of over £3.2 billion[5]:

o raising £700m equity

o advising on 29 public and private M&A transactions with an aggregate value of c2.1 billion:

o raising c.£400m debt finance
