= Mark Philp =

Mark Philp (born 17 May 1952) is a British political philosopher and historian of political thought who specialises in British political thought in the late 18th and early 19th centuries. He has published books on Thomas Paine and on responses to the French Revolution in Britain.

Philp was a Fellow of Oriel College from 1983 to 2013, and was head of the then newly created University of Oxford Department of Politics and International Relations from 2000 to 2005. He is currently professor of History and Politics at the University of Warwick working on political corruption and the standards of public life, as well as democratic thought in the late eighteenth and early nineteenth centuries. . Recently, Philp completed a three-year digitisation project of the diaries of William Godwin, funded by a Leverhulme Research Project Grant. .

Philp currently chairs the research advisory board for the United Kingdom's Committee on Standards in Public Life.

== Books ==
- Reforming Ideas in Britain: Politics and Language in the Shadow of the French Revolution 1798-1815 [2013]
- Thomas Paine (Very Interesting People) [2007] OUP Page, with Contents
- Political Conduct [2007] HUP Page, with Description
- Resisting Napoleon: The British Response to the Threat of Invasion 1797–1815 (Editor) [2006]
- Napoleon and the Invasion of Britain (with Alexandra Franklin) [2003]
- Rights of Man, Common Sense, Other Political Writings (Oxford World Classics; Editor) [1998]
- The Political and Philosophical Writings of William Godwin (Pickering Masters; edited with Martin FitzPatrick and William St. Clair) [1993]
- The Collected Novels and Memoirs of William Godwin (Pickering Masters; edited with Pamela Clemit and Maurice Hindle) [1992]
- The French Revolution and British Popular Politics (Editor) [1991]
- Paine (Past Master's) [1989]
- Godwin's Political Justice [1986]

He is also Series Editor of the Oxford University Press Founders of Modern Political and Social Thought series, which presently includes volumes on Plato, Aristotle, Aquinas, Machiavelli, Rousseau, Tocqueville and Durkheim.
